= Thomas Hardmeier =

Swiss cinematographer

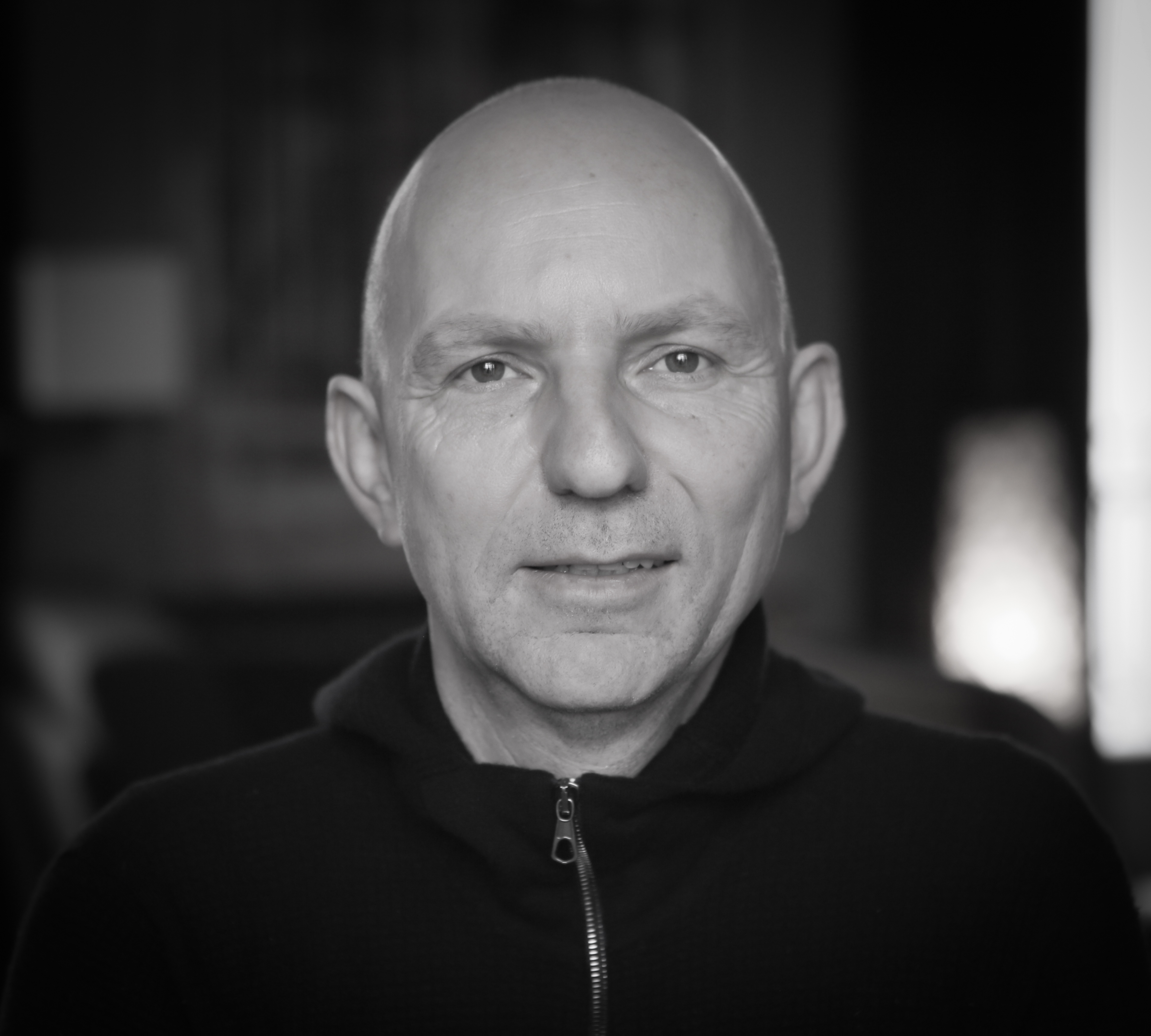
- Thomas Hardmeier in 2019
- Born: 16 February 1965 (age 60); Zürich, Switzerland
- Occupation: Cinematographer

Thomas Hardmeier (born 16 February 1965) is a Swiss cinematographer. His credits include 22 Bullets, Yves Saint Laurent, A Butterfly Kiss and Accomplices. In 2014, he won the award for Best Cinematography at the César Awards and the Lumière Awards for the film The Young and Prodigious T.S. Spivet.

Hardmeier lives in Geneva, Switzerland.

== Filmography ==
| Year | Title | Director |
|---|---|---|
| 1994 | Das langsame Sterben des Sumatranashorns | Mike Wildbolz |
| 1996 | Die Klienten - Einblick in die Seele | Mike Wildbolz |
| 1997 | Par fom a passion: Storie di uomini e bestie | Mike Wildbolz |
| 1998 | Ryhiner's Business | Mike Wildbolz |
| 2000 | Mondialito | Nicolas Wadimoff |
| 2001 | Stille Liebe | Christoph Schaub |
| 2001 | Thelma | Pierre-Alain Meier |
| 2002 | SwissLove | Fulvio Bernasconi |
| 2002 | Ricco | Mike Wildbolz |
| 2004 | Villa Henriette | Peter Payer |
| 2005 | The Black Box | Richard Berry |
| 2007 | Chrysalis | Julien Leclercq |
| 2008 | Coluche: l'histoire d'un mec | Antoine de Caunes |
| 2009 | Accomplices | Frédéric Mermoud |
| 2010 | 22 Bullets | Richard Berry |
| 2010 | Je n'ai rien oublié | Bruno Chiche |
| 2011 | Un baiser papillon | Karine Silla |
| 2011 | R.I.F. (Recherches dans l'Intérêt des Familles) | Franck Mancuso |
| 2011 | Les tribulations d'une caissière | Pierre Rambaldi |
| 2012 | Do Not Disturb | Yvan Attal |
| 2013 | Collision | David Marconi |
| 2013 | The Young and Prodigious T. S. Spivet | Jean-Pierre Jeunet |
| 2014 | Yves Saint Laurent | Jalil Lespert |
| 2014 | De guerre lasse | Olivier Panchot |
| 2014 | Next Time I'll Aim for the Heart | Cédric Anger |
| 2015 | Nos femmes | Richard Berry |
| 2016 | Tout, tout de suite | Richard Berry |
| 2018 | Au bout des doigts | Ludovic Bernard |
| 2018 | Paris Pigalle | Cédric Anger |
| 2019 | Ut og stjæle hester | Hans Petter Moland |
| 2019 | Place des Victoires | Yoann Guillouzouic |
| 2020 | Villa Caprice | Bernard Stora |
| 2022 | Bigbug | Jean-Pierre Jeunet |
| 2022 | The Takedown | Louis Leterrier |
| 2022 | Sous emprise | David M. Rosenthal |
