= Omar Raddad Affair =

1991 French criminal case

The Omar Raddad Affair was a highly publicised criminal trial in Mougins, France. After the murder of wealthy widow Ghislaine Marchal in 1991, her gardener Omar Raddad, an illiterate immigrant from Morocco, was arrested. Raddad was convicted in 1994 and sentenced to 18 years in prison. He has maintained his innocence, and received a partial pardon from French President Jacques Chirac in 1996 at the request of Moroccan King Hassan II, which reduced his sentence to four years and eight months. He was released from prison in 1998, and in 2021 received permission to reopen the case after the discovery of new DNA evidence.

The wrongly conjugated sentence "Omar m'a tuer" ("Omar kill me"), found written in blood at the crime scene, became a widely used phrase in French society during the 1990s. The last word of the sentence was not properly conjugated; it should read: "Omar m'a tuée". Skeptics contended that this was an odd mistake for a native French speaker to make. The case was the subject of the 2011 film Omar m'a tuer by Roschdy Zem.

== Murder and discovery ==
=== Background ===
Born Ghislaine de Renty, Ghislaine Marchal was the daughter of an industrialist who participated in the Resistance during the Second World War and died after being deported. Divorced from her first husband, with whom she had a son, in 1991 she was the wealthy widow of Jean-Pierre Marchal, owner of a company that supplied equipment for automobiles. She divided her time between a primary residence in Switzerland and her villa La Chamade, which she had built in the hills of Mougins, near Cannes, and where she was killed.

=== Disappearance of Ghislaine Marchal ===
On Sunday 23 June 1991 at 11:50am, Ghislaine Marchal finished a brief phone conversation with her friend Erika S. She said she had just showered and was in a hurry because she was having lunch with her friends Collette K. and her husband at 1pm.

Erika S. arrived at La Chamade on Monday 24 June at 11:30 for lunch as planned. She rang the doorbell twice and called, but there was no answer. Alerted by her and Colette K., a third friend, Francine P., sent an employee of the security company to the house in the early afternoon. The house, dark and silent, showed no trace of a break in. The blinds had only been drawn in the bedroom; glasses and a newspaper were on the unmade bed; a breakfast tray was in the kitchen. The door was not bolted and the keys were in the lock; the alarm was not activated. It seemed as though Ghislaine Marchal had just woken up, but she was not in the house. The security company employee returned with Francine P. and her attendant. They were quickly joined by Mrs Marchal's doctor. Searching the house, they found jewellery and an open handbag that contained no money.

=== Basement door ===
The police were alerted in the evening. After searching the main house, they became interested in an annexe with stairs down to a cellar. The metal door to the cellar was found locked, and would not open more than 2cm after it was unlocked. While one officer pushed against it, another was able to insert his arm and identify a folding bed placed against the door on the inside. He managed to push it away, but the door remained blocked by a metal pipe wedged against the cement floor. Eventually, by bending the door and kicking the pipe, the officers were able to open the door. In January 1992, investigators noted that a semi-circular imprint was left on the cement.

=== Discovery of the body ===
At the back of the cellar, Ghislaine Marchal was found lying face down, her legs pointing to the back wall, her arms stretched out in front of her on the ground, dressed in only a blood-stained bath robe pulled up to above her waist.

The doctor's first observations on the evening of the 24th, and the autopsy of 28 June revealed severe injuries: "her skull [had been] broken, her throat cut, one finger sliced off and her body pierced 10 times by a sharp blade". Scrapes on the arms and legs, in particular on the soles of her feet and the back of the knees, as well as traces of dust and cement on the robe, suggested that the victim had been dragged.

Forensic experts noted that it was impossible to determine the order in which the blows were delivered. None were immediately fatal; she was judged to have lived for approximately 15 to 30 minutes. Police captain Georges Cenci noted that the killer seemed "determined, but also clumsy in his movements".

Dr. Jean Pagliuzza, a forensic physician who had been consulted by the defense lawyers, spoke to journalist Eve Livet after Raddad was sentenced. According to him, Marchal could have been killed in a rapid sequence of blows over as little as 3 to 4 minutes. In his opinion, the attack followed a pattern in which the initial blows were intended to immobilise the victim by stunning her, after which fatal blows with a bladed weapon follow very quickly. "Taking into account the force of the blows, her aggressor was a man...he was left-handed". He said that the lowest cut was the first to be made: "The blade hit higher and higher the more the victim collapsed". The V-shaped injury on the neck "is often found in this type of murder" because of the lateral movement of the head, looking to escape the blows to the neck. According to Pagliuzza, the attacker must certainly have received blood on him. From the flow of blood, he was confident that the victim never got up; she died "rapidly from bleeding". If she had stood up, the haemorrhage of the liver would have filled the abdominal cavity, which the forensic scientists had not found.

=== "Omar" inscriptions ===
The metal door of the cellar opened onto a hallway. On the left "Omar m'a tuer" ("Omar killed me" in grammatically incorrect French; "Omar m'a tuée" would be correct) was written in blood, in well formed letters, one meter above ground level, on a locked white door leading to the wine cellar. A bloody trace was visible under the inscription. In front of the metal door, at the back of the main room, part of the same sentence was written on the door of the boiler room: "Omar m'a t". This second inscription was lower than the first and barely legible. It was situated on the boiler room side of the door, but because that door was blocked open, it faced the entrance of the room and not the boiler room, where the body was.

== Trial and conviction of Omar Raddad ==
In 1994 Omar Raddad, Marchal's Moroccan-born gardener, who at that time spoke little French and was illiterate, was convicted of Marchal's murder and sentenced to 18 years in prison. In the original pathology report, the date of death was given as the 24th, when Raddad had an alibi; it was later changed to the 23rd as a correction of what was said to be an error. The family's lawyer argued that Raddad locked the cellar door on leaving, but that Marchal herself blocked it on the inside in case he returned. After a request from Moroccan King Hassan II led to a partial pardon in 1996 by then French President Jacques Chirac, Raddad was released in September 1998 after serving four years. His name was not cleared.

=== Public discussion ===
Marchal's family argued that Raddad killed her because she had refused an advance on his wages. Raddad has always denied these claims, saying Marchal had always treated him well and he had no reason to hurt her. No DNA evidence belonging to Raddad was found at the scene. The family have been represented by celebrity lawyer Georges Kiejman; since Raddad's conviction, another celebrity lawyer, Jacques Vergès, has argued for him. Racism has been alleged; during the trial, the presiding judge told Raddad in Arabic, "Anyone who cannot read or write should hide themselves away in a hole."

Much of the disagreement surrounding the legal verdict stemmed from the grammatical error in "Omar m'a tuer". Many argue that a fluent French speaker like Marchal would not make such a grammatical error. However, investigators found examples of writing by Marchal in which the same error is present, and her niece, Sabine du Granrut, has said that her aunt did not have a post-secondary education. Experts at the original trial said that the blood in which the messages were written was Marchal's, and were "two thirds" sure the handwriting was hers; subsequent experts have judged it impossible to identify the handwriting.

"Omar m'a tuer" became a catchphrase in France in the 1990s. Two books about the case, Omar. La construction d'un coupable, by Jean-Marie Rouart, and Pourquoi moi?, by Raddad himself, were the basis of a film by Roschdy Zem, Omar m'a tuer, released in 2011.

== New evidence and re-examination ==
Raddad was refused a reexamination of the evidence in 2002. In 2015, new DNA technology revealed traces of four unknown males. According to an expert for Raddad, 35 traces of DNA from at least one unknown source were found in the second written message. In 2021, Raddad requested a retrial on the basis of this new evidence; the appeals court granted the request in December 2021. In October 2022, the investigative commission rejected Omar Raddad's request for a review of the trial.
