= Le Grand Jeu =

Le Grand Jeu may refer to:

- The Great Game (in French Le Grand Jeu), the strategic rivalry between the British Empire and the Russian Empire for supremacy in central Asia
- Le Grand Jeu (journal), the title of a French literary review, founded in 1928 by René Daumal and others
- Le Grand Jeu, a 1928 poetry collection by Benjamin Péret

== Films ==
- Le Grand Jeu (1934 film), a film directed by Jacques Feyder
- Le Grand Jeu (1954 film), a film directed by Robert Siodmak
- Le Grand Jeu (2015 film), a film directed by Nicolas Pariser
