= Lie (disambiguation) =

A lie is a type of deception, an untruth or not telling the truth.

Lie, LIE or A Lie may also refer to:

== Places ==
- Liechtenstein, IOC country code LIE
- Long Island Expressway (LIE), alternate name for Interstate 495 (New York)

== People ==
- Lie (surname)
- Saint Lié (died 533)

== Films and Television ==
- Lie (film) (Telugu లై), a 2017 Indian film
- L.I.E. (film), a 2001 LGBT film revolving around the Long Island Expressway
- "Lies, Lies, Lies", an episode of the American sitcom Herman's Head

== Music ==
- "Lie" (Black Light Burns song)
- "Lie" (Kizz Daniel song)
- "Lie" (Lukas Graham song)
- "Lie" (NF song)
- "L.I.E", a song by EXID from Street, 2016
- "Lie", a song by BTS from Wings
- "Lie", a song by Dream Theater from Awake
- "Lie", a song by Halsey from Hopeless Fountain Kingdom
- "Lie", a song by T-ara from Absolute First Album
- "A Lie", a song by French Montana
- "A lie", a song by B1A4 from Good Timing, 2016
- Lie: The Love and Terror Cult, an album by Charles Manson
- "Lie", a Vocaloid song featuring Megurine Luka, made by CircusP

== Mathematics ==
- Carathéodory–Jacobi–Lie theorem
- Law of iterated expectations, or law of total expectation, initialized as LIE, a probability, statistical concept
- Lie algebra
- Lie bracket of vector fields
- Lie derivative
- Lie group
  - Group of Lie type
- Lie sphere geometry
- Lie theory

== Other uses ==
- Lie (obstetrics), an obstetrical term for the axis of the foetus
- Lie, topography or surface characteristics at a golf course
- Liquid impingement erosion, or LIE, alternate name for Water droplet erosion, or WDE, a form of materials wear
- Logical Intuitive Extrovert, or LIE, in socionics
- Lying (position), the recumbent position of the human body

== See also ==
- Liar (disambiguation)
- Lye (disambiguation)
- The Lie (disambiguation)
- LI3 (disambiguation)
