= The Lie =

The Lie may refer to:

== Books ==
- The Lie (poem), c. 1592, political and social criticism poem probably written by Sir Walter Raleigh
- The Lie (novel), a 1970 novel by Greek author Georges Sari
- The Lie, a 2015 novel by English author Cally Taylor
- The Lie, a play by Henry Arthur Jones
- The Lie, a 2014 novel by Helen Dunmore
- The Lie: Evolution, a 1987 book by Ken Ham

== Film ==
- The Lie (1912 film), a silent film starring King Baggot and Lottie Briscoe
- The Lie (1914 film), a silent film featuring Murdock MacQuarrie, Pauline Bush, and Lon Chaney
- The Lie (1918 film), a silent film starring Elsie Ferguson
- The Lie (1950 film), a West German crime film
- The Lie (1952 film), a Mexican romantic drama film
- The Lie (1954 film), a West German-American TV movie produced by Burt Balaban
- The Lie (1970 film), a Swedish television film
- The Lie (1992 film), a French drama film about AIDS by François Margolin with Nathalie Baye
- The Lie (2011 film), an American drama/comedy film written and directed by Joshua Leonard
- The Lie (2018 film), a Canadian thriller film
- The Lie (2024 film), a UK-NZ co-production about the murder of Grace Millane

== Music ==
- "The Lie", a 2007 single by Nikki McKibbin
- "The Lie", a 2023 single by Samantha Mumba
- "The Lie", a song from the "Trilogy of Knowledge" suite from Believer's 1993 album Dimensions
- "The Lie", a song from Of Mice & Men's 2016 album Cold World
- "The Lie", a song from Tori Kelly's 2019 album Inspired by True Events

== Television ==
- The Lie (game show), an Irish quiz show
- "The Lie" (The Amazing World of Gumball), a 2014 episode
- "The Lie" (Knots Landing), a 1980 episode
- "The Lie" (Lost), a 2009 episode
- "The Lie" (Playhouse 90), a 1973 American television play

== See also ==
- Lie (disambiguation)
