= Cédric Anger =

French film director

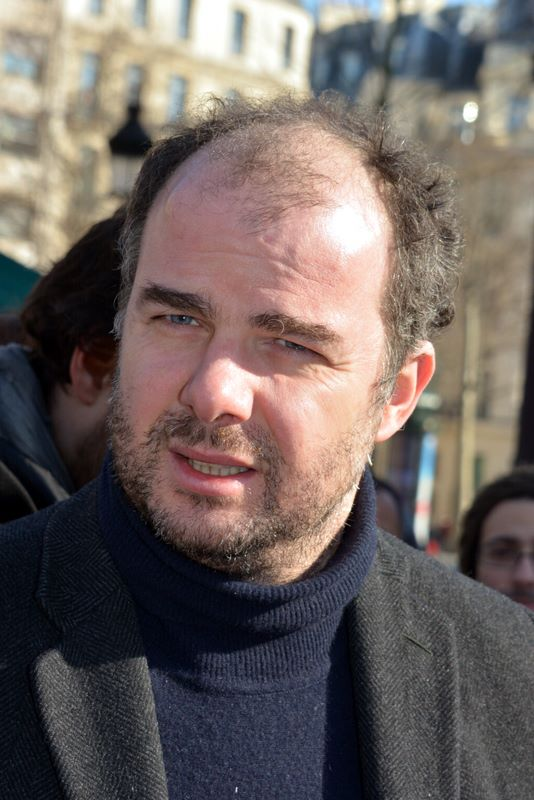
- Anger in 2015
- Born: 1975 (age 50–51); Caen, France
- Occupations: Film director; screenwriter
- Years active: 2000–present

Cédric Anger (born 1975 in Caen) is a French film director and screenwriter. He has directed four feature films: The Killer (2007), The Counsel (2010), Next Time I'll Aim for the Heart (2014), and Paris Pigalle (2018).

== Career ==
Anger was a critic for Cahiers du cinéma from 1993 to 2001, where he arrived at the age of 18 as a protégé of Jean Douchet. While in high school, Anger started a magazine which he sent to Douchet as well as Serge Daney and Alain Bergala. Douchet and Daney responded. On the occasion of Douchet introducing Robert Bresson's Pickpocket (1959) in a theater, Douchet advised Anger to write for Cahiers du cinéma. He traveled to Paris on the year of his graduation, where Douchet introduced him to Thierry Jousse. Anger began working for the magazine by the end of 1993, but left six months later to work as an assistant on André Téchiné's Thieves (1996) and on other films. He returned to Cahiers du cinéma at the beginning of 1995 when a new staff was taking charge of the magazine.

Anger got his start in film co-writing the screenplays for Xavier Beauvois's films To Matthieu (2000) and Le Petit Lieutenant (2005), the latter of which garnered Anger a nomination for Best Original Screenplay at the 31st César Awards. In 2002, he made his directorial debut with the short film Novela, which had a positive reception from critics as well as at festivals. That same year, he co-wrote the screenplay for Werner Schroeter's film Two (2002).

In 2007, he made his feature directorial debut, The Killer, a thriller starring Gilbert Melki, Mélanie Laurent and Grégoire Colin. In 2014, he directed his third film, Next Time I'll Aim for the Heart, inspired by the story of the killer gendarme Alain Lamare, and for which Anger received a nomination for Best Adaptation at the 40th César Awards.

In June 2024, Apple TV announced a six-part thriller series starring Benoît Magimel and Mélanie Laurent, created and directed by Anger. Titled The Hunt, the series was postponed in November 2025 pending an investigation into allegations that Anger plagiarized the series' story from Douglas Fairbairn's 1973 novel Shoot, which previously was adapted into the 1976 film Shoot. The series premiered on Apple TV on 4 March 2026 with a label on each episode identifying it as having been adapted from Fairbairn's novel and also credits the 1976 film adaptation.

== Filmography ==
Year	Title	Director	Screenwriter	Notes
2000	To Matthieu	No	Yes	
2002	Novela	Yes	Yes	Short film
2002	Two	No	Yes	
2005	Le Petit Lieutenant	No	Yes	Collaboration
2007	The Killer	Yes	Yes	
2010	The Counsel	Yes	Yes	
2014	In the Name of My Daughter	No	Yes	
2014	Next Time I'll Aim for the Heart	Yes	Yes	
2017	Golden Years	No	Yes	
2017	All That Divides Us	No	Yes	
2018	Paris Pigalle	Yes	Yes	
2020	How I Became a Super Hero	No	Yes	Collaboration
2023	Soul Mates	No	Yes	
2023	Wingwomen	No	Yes	
2025	The Richest Woman in the World	No	Yes	
2026	The Hunt	Yes	Yes	Television series

== Accolades ==
Award	Date of ceremony	Category	Film	Result	Ref.
César Awards	25 February 2006	Best Original Screenplay	Le Petit Lieutenant	Nominated	
César Awards	20 February 2015	Best Adaptation	Next Time I'll Aim for the Heart	Nominated	
