= Siegfried (film director) =

French film director and composer (1973–2024)

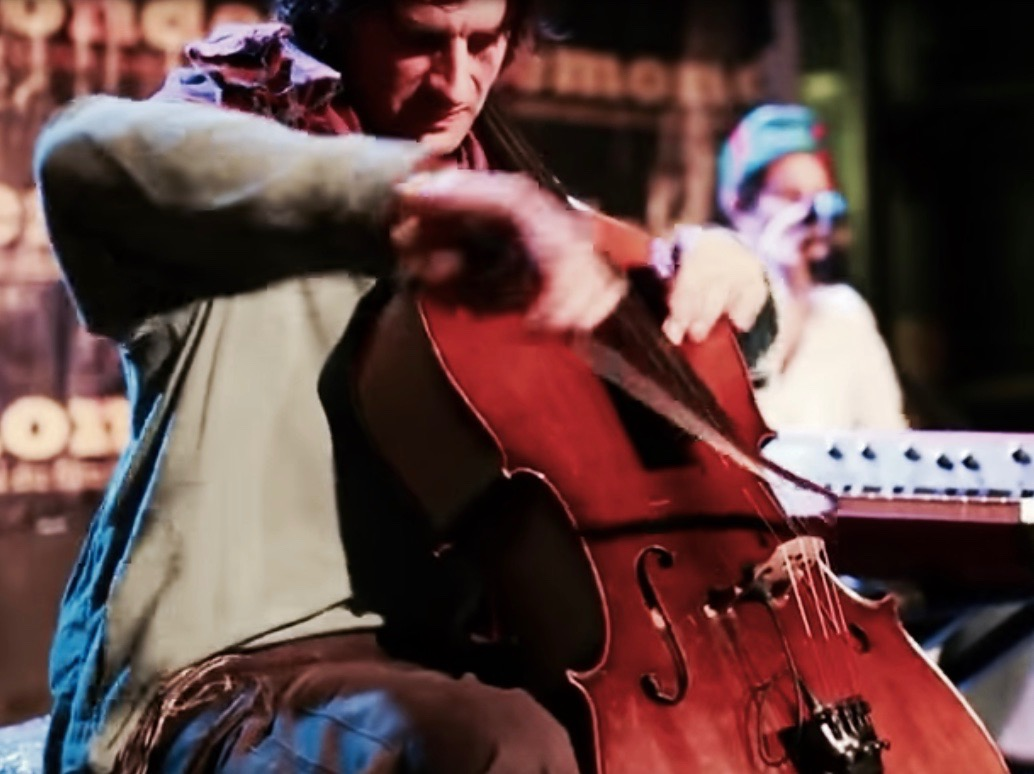
- Siegfried in 2019
- Born: Siegfried Debrebant; 23 January 1973
- Died: 3 October 2024 (aged 51)
- Education: Conservatoire de Paris
- Occupations: Film director Composer

Siegfried Debrebant (23 January 1973 – 3 October 2024), more commonly known as simply Siegfried, was a French film director and composer. A graduate of the Conservatoire de Paris, he worked closely with Roschdy Zem and produced with him the film Le Faim. Siegfried died on 3 October 2024, at the age of 51.

== Filmography ==
=== As composer ===
- No happy end (1996)
- For Sale (1998)
- Louise (Take 2) (1998)
- Sansa (2003)
- The Recruiter (2004)
- Chok-Dee (2005)
- Deadly Seasons: Crimson Winter (2012)

=== As director ===
- La Toile (1995)
- La Dame (1995)
- La Faim (1996)
- Louise (take 2) (1998)
- Sansa (2003)
- Kinogamma - Part 1: East (2008)
- Kinogamma - Part 2: Far East (2008)
- Kids Stories (film) (2012)
- Riga (Take 1) (2017)

== Award ==
- Best music for Deadly Seasons: Crimson Winter (Festival de la fiction TV de La Rochelle, 2011)
