= The Hunt (2026 TV series) =

French drama web television series

- Genre: Action drama
- Created by: Cédric Anger
- Based on: Shoot by Douglas Fairbairn
- Written by: Cédric Anger; Diane Clavier
- Directed by: Cédric Anger; Guillaume Renusson
- Starring: Benoît Magimel; Mélanie Laurent; Damien Bonnard; Cédric Appietto; Manuel Guillot; Frédéric Maranber
- Composer: Eric Neveux
- Country of origin: France
- Original language: French
- No. of series: 1
- No. of episodes: 6

Production
- Executive producers: Susan Westfall; François Perillat; Alexis Barqueiro; Sidonie Dumas; Clémentine Vaudaux
- Producer: Isabelle Degeorges
- Cinematography: Noémie Gillot; Rémy Chevrin
- Editors: Bertrand Nail; Sarah Ternat
- Running time: 46–53 minutes
- Production company: Gaumont Television

Original release
- Network: Apple TV
- Release: 4 March 2026 – present

The Hunt (French: Traqués) is a French drama television series consisting of six episodes and produced by Gaumont Television. It was released globally by Apple TV on 4 March 2026, after a delay caused by a plagiarism investigation.

== Premise ==
Franck and his longtime friends enjoy spending their weekends hunting together. One Sunday, one in their party is suddenly shot and wounded by an unknown assalient, and this is immediately followed by numerous shots against the rest of the group. The group shoots back and an attacker is hit and falls to the ground. This results in more shots from other assaliants, making it obvious that they have a fire fight with numerous people. Barely managing to escape, the four friends keep the event a secret, as they are convinced that the short attacker has been killed, which can lead to murder accusations. However, over the next few days, Franck starts to feel that he and his friends are being watched by another group of hunters hell-bent on revenge.

== Cast and characters ==
- Benoît Magimel as Franck
- Mélanie Laurent as Krystel, Franck's wife
- Damien Bonnard as Xavier
- Cédric Appietto as Simon
- Manuel Guillot as Gilles
- Frédéric Maranber as Leo

== Episodes ==
No.	Title	Directed by	Written by	Original release date
1	"Day of Hunting"	Cédric Anger	Cédric Anger	4 March 2026
2	"The Return"	Cédric Anger	Cédric Anger	4 March 2026
3	"Collateral Damage"	Guillaume Renusson	Cédric Anger & Diane Clavier	11 March 2026
4	"Mountain Law"	Cédric Anger	Cédric Anger & Diane Clavier	18 March 2026
5	"Positional Warfare"	Cédric Anger	Cédric Anger & Diane Clavier	25 March 2026
6	"The Assault"	Cédric Anger	Cédric Anger	1 April 2026

== Release and plagiarism controversy ==
The series was scheduled to premiere on Apple TV on 3 December 2025, but this was postponed in late November 2025, following claims that the series' story was plagiarized from the 1973 novel Shoot, by Douglas Fairbairn, which also was the basis for the 1976 feature film Shoot.

An investigation by Gaumont Television established that the series screenwriter and director, Cédric Anger, had neglected giving Fairbairn credit for the original story. After having corrected this in the series' credits and press material, a new premier date of 4 March 2026 was announced on 19 February.
