= In the Name of My Daughter =

- Theatrical release poster
- Directed by: André Téchiné
- Screenplay by: Cédric Anger; Jean-Charles Le Roux; André Téchiné
- Based on: Une femme face à la Mafia by Jean-Charles Le Roux and Renée Le Roux
- Produced by: Olivier Delbosc; Marc Missonnier
- Starring: Catherine Deneuve; Guillaume Canet; Adèle Haenel
- Cinematography: Julien Hirsch
- Edited by: Hervé de Luze
- Music by: Benjamin Biolay
- Production company: Fidélité Films
- Distributed by: Mars Distribution
- Release dates: 21 May 2014 (Cannes); 16 July 2014 (France)
- Running time: 116 minutes
- Country: France
- Language: French
- Budget: 7.996488 €
- Box office: 2.200.000€

In the Name of My Daughter (French: L'Homme qu'on aimait trop; also known as French Riviera) is a 2014 French drama film directed by André Téchiné and starring Catherine Deneuve, Guillaume Canet and Adèle Haenel. The script was based on the memoir, Une femme face à la Mafia, written by Renée Le Roux and her son Jean-Charles Le Roux. It retraces the Agnès Le Roux case, which made headlines in France from the late 1970s to the 2010s.

== Plot ==
Agnès Le Roux, a young independent woman, returns to Nice in 1976 to have a new start in her life after a failed marriage. Her mother, Renée Le Roux, a wealthy widow, is fighting with other shareholders for control of the Palais de la Méditerranée, a casino on the French Rivera. The casino is facing difficulties and in one night, it loses five million francs to professional gamblers who very likely tampered a game.

Agnès, determined to make it on her own, opens a small bookstore where she sells African artifacts and Asian textiles. Renée, with the help of her lawyer and personal adviser, Maurice Agnelet, and her daughter's decisive vote on her favor, takes control of the Palais de la Méditerranée. However, the mother-daughter relationship is strained. Harsh and straightforward, Renée refuses to give her daughter the share of Agnès’ inheritance from her late father. Maurice, ambitious and charming, is attracted to the beautiful, but stubborn Agnès. They become fast friends. Maurice is separated from his wife and has a small son to which he is close. He is also a ladies man. One of the women he is dating, Françoise, believing that he is having an affair with Agnès, visits her at the bookstore to warn her about Maurice. If she has not fallen for him yet, she eventually will. He beds all the young women around him.

As Maurice begins to open up to Agnès, she falls in love with him and they begin a passionate affair. Maurice's high hopes of becoming the managing director of the casino are dashed when Renée gives the position to a more experienced manager. In revenge, Maurice decides to help Agnès get the three million francs inheritance her mother has refused to give her. The money is provided by Jean-Dominique Fratoni, an Italian mafia boss and Renée's business rival. Fratoni buys Agnès' shares and she votes against her mother in the next board meeting. As a consequence, Renée loses her position undermining her wealth. Fratoni takes over the casino's operations only to have it closed. Agnès betrayal of her mother and Renée's downfall make news headlines. Agnès' guilt over the situation is eased by Maurice. Although she is aware of his faults, she opens a share bank account with him in Vevey, trusting him with her fortune. Renée is ruined. Mario, her faithful Italian chauffeur, tries to cheer her up, but he brings the subject of her daughter's betrayal and she prefers not to talk about it.

Initially happy with Maurice, Agnès begins to ask from him more than he is willing to give and her love for him becomes oppressive. As she loves him more and more, Maurice pulls away from Agnès. When she appears, unexpectedly, to see him with his son, he humiliates her and forces her to apologize and smile a real smile for his forgiveness. Passing her breaking point, Agnès attempts to commit suicide with an overdose of pills. Renée goes to the hospital to visit her, but Agnès refuses to see her mother. Maurice installs Agnès back in her apartment, but he is indifferent as she is despondent over him. Shortly afterwards, Agnès disappears without a trace. A few months later, Maurice has Agnès's money transferred to his own account. Her mother, having lost everything, takes on a 20+year crusade to prove that Maurice killed her daughter or had her killed by someone else.

Now elderly and frail, Renée finally succeeds in having the investigation into her daughter's disappearance reopened. Maurice, who was living in Panama, returns voluntarily to France to face the trial. His son, now an adult, is his main supporter. At the trial things get complicated for Maurice since Françoise testifies against him. She recants a previous alibi she had provided for Maurice, saying that she was not with him in Switzerland at the time of Agnès disappearance. In front of the court, Renée pleads for justice for her daughter. However, Maurice is acquitted of all charges. A title card informs the audience that in 2014, based on his son's testimony, Maurice was later found guilty of Agnès death and sentenced to twenty years in prison.

== Cast ==
- Catherine Deneuve as Renée Le Roux
- Guillaume Canet as Maurice Agnelet
- Adèle Haenel as Agnès Le Roux
- Judith Chemla as Françoise
- Jean Corso as Fratoni
- Laetitia Rosier as Annie
- Mauro Conte as Mario
- Pascal Mercier as Guérin
- Tamara De Leener as Madeleine
- Jean-Marie Tiercelin as Briault
- Ali Af Shari as Reynier
- Hubert Rollet as Palmero
- Tanya Lopert as Lydie

== Production ==
In the Name of my daughter is a fictionalized account of the true story of the events surrounding the life of Agnès Le Roux, a casino's heiress, before and after her unresolved disappearance in the fall 1977. However, interviewed in May 2014, Téchiné commented: "I really have changed very little. I wanted the film to be very factual so I was very respectful of the events as they unfolded, while I was trying to depict the tragic relationship of these characters."

The film project started out as a commission, making a loose adaptation of the book of memoirs Une femme face à la Mafia (A woman up against the Mafia) written by the real-life Renée Le Roux and her son Jean-Charles Le Roux. The book tells the story of the casino wars on the French Riviera between the 1970s – 1980's, from the protagonist's point of view. It includes the account of the take-over of Madame Le Roux's Palais de le Mediterranee casino by Jean-Dominique Fratoni, with the support of Jacques Medecin, the then mayor of Nice.

Téchiné co-wrote the script with Jean-Charles Le Roux (Agnès' brother) and Cédric Anger, director of Next Time I'll Aim for the Heart (La Prochaine Fois Je Viserai Le Coeur) a film also starring Guillaume Canet. Rather than focusing in the judicial twists of Agnelet's trial, Téchiné wanted to center the plot in the love and power struggle between Renée Le Roux, her daughter Agnès, and Maurice Agnelet: the iron-fisted mother, the rebellious daughter and Agnelet's desire for recognition by society. "It was Agnès that I was most interested in" Techine explains adding: " I wanted to paint her portrait. I agreed to make the film after reading the letters that Agnes had written to Agnelet because, quite unexpectedly, I found a surprising resemblance with another female character that I had long wanted to bring to the screen, Julie de Lespinasse. There are many parallels between the passionate love letters of this 18th century woman of letters and Agnes – heir to the Palais de la Mediterranee’s – letters. For example:"I love you how you must be loved, with excess, madness, ardor and despair."

== Release ==
In the Name of my daughter premiered, screened out of competition, at the 2014 Cannes Film Festival.

In France, it was released in July 2014 and it attracted 300,373 audiences. In Chennai the film was screened as the opening film of the 12th Chennai International Film Festival in December 2014. In January 2015, the film received two nominations at the 20th Lumière Awards.

== Reception ==
In the United States the film garnered a lukewarm critical reaction. It holds an approval rating of 50% on Rotten Tomatoes based on 46 reviews, with an average rating of 5.9/10. The website's critical consensus reads: "Perplexingly less than the sum of its dramatic real-life parts, In the Name of My Daughter doesn't do enough to support its story — or Catherine Deneuve's performance. Metacritic gave the film an average score of 57/100 based on 21 critics, indicating "mixed or average reviews".

Rex Reed in his review for New York Observer concluded: " The characters' intense desires are framed within a sedate, workaday context, so that even though the characters' passions drive the action, director Andre Téchiné lends the film an appealing illusion of calm."

Richard Brody from The New Yorker called the film "a ready-made classic melodrama". Nicolas Rapold writing for The New York Times commented that "Mr. Téchiné ’s methodical storytelling covers more narrative ground than the drama requires, sapping the film’s energy."

In his review for the San Francisco Chronicle, Mick LaSalle described In the Name of my daughter as "Lacking action to the point of seeming immobile, Mr. Téchiné nevertheless amasses a catalogue of anger, desire and sex, enhanced by stunning landscapes of villas and a parade of the rich and glamorous haut monde at play." While Stephanie Merry in The Washington Post commented: "In the Name of My Daughter has good intentions of taking a sensationalistic riddle and turning it into a human story. But the pendulum ultimately swings too far, leaving an explosive tale behind in favor of one that fizzles out."

== DVD release ==
The film was released on DVD in the United States on 8 May 2015.
