= Nathalie Baye =

French actress (1948–2026)

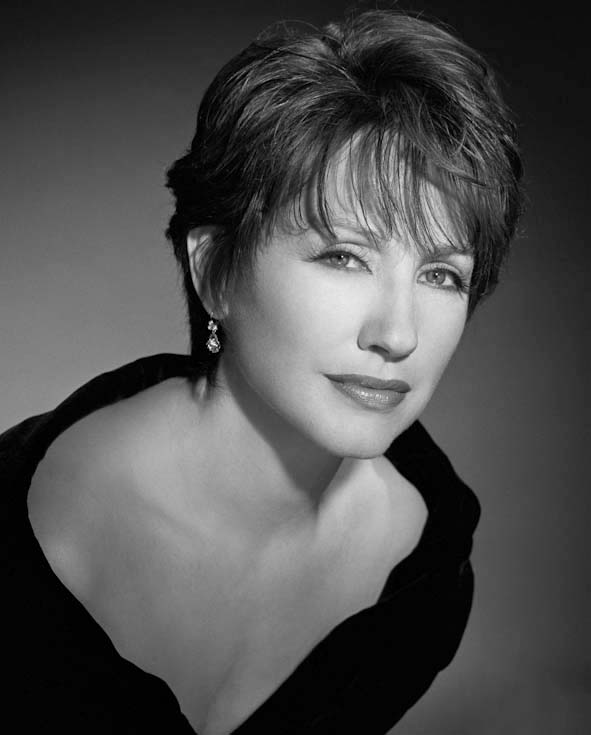
- Baye in 1994
- Born: Nathalie Marie Andrée Baye; 6 July 1948; Mainneville, France
- Died: 17 April 2026 (aged 77); Paris, France
- Occupation: Actress
- Years active: 1970–2023
- Partner(s): Philippe Léotard (1972–1982); Johnny Hallyday (1982–1986)
- Children: Laura Smet

Nathalie Marie Andrée Baye (French: [natali baj]; 6 July 1948 – 17 April 2026) was a French film, television and stage actress. She began her career in 1970 and has appeared in more than 80 films. A ten-time César Award nominee, her four wins were for Every Man for Himself (1980), Strange Affair (1981), La Balance (1982), and The Young Lieutenant (2005). Her other films include Day for Night (1973), Catch Me If You Can (2002), Tell No One (2006), and The Assistant (2015). In 2009, she was appointed a Chevalier of the Legion of Honour.

== Early life ==
Baye was born in Mainneville, Eure, Normandy, on 6 July 1948, to Claude Baye and Denise Coustet, two painters. At 14, she joined a school of dance in Monaco. Three years later she went to the United States. On returning to France, she continued with dance but also registered for the Simon Course and was admitted to the Conservatoire, from where she graduated in 1972 with a second prize in comedy, dramatic comedy, and foreign theatre.

== Career ==
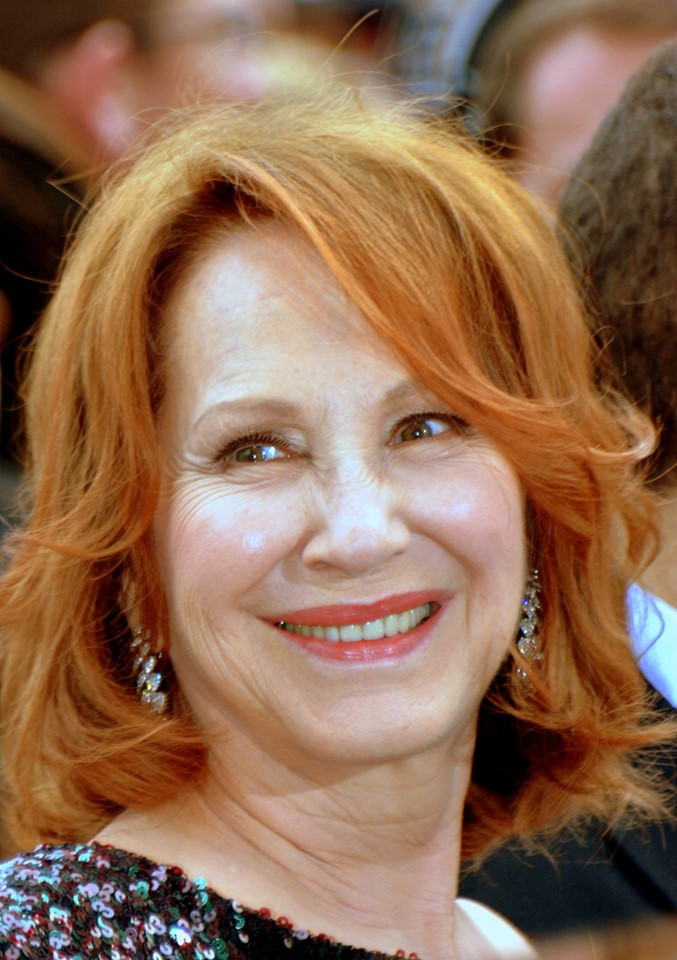
Baye at the 2019 Cannes Film Festival

Baye's second film appearance was in Two People (1973), directed by Robert Wise. She became better known as Joëlle, the script girl, in Day for Night (La Nuit américaine, 1973) by François Truffaut. Throughout the 1970s, she played the good girlfriend or nice provincial girl in film and television.

She won her first César, as best supporting artist, for Every Man for Himself (Sauve qui peut (la vie), 1980) directed by Jean-Luc Godard. There then followed The Return of Martin Guerre (Le Retour de Martin Guerre, 1982) and La Balance (also 1982).

Baye won two more César Awards, Best Supporting Actress, for Strange Affair (Une étrange affaire, 1981), and Best Actress for La Balance, 1982). Her four-year relationship with Johnny Hallyday made them a celebrity couple and their daughter is Laura Smet, now an actress.

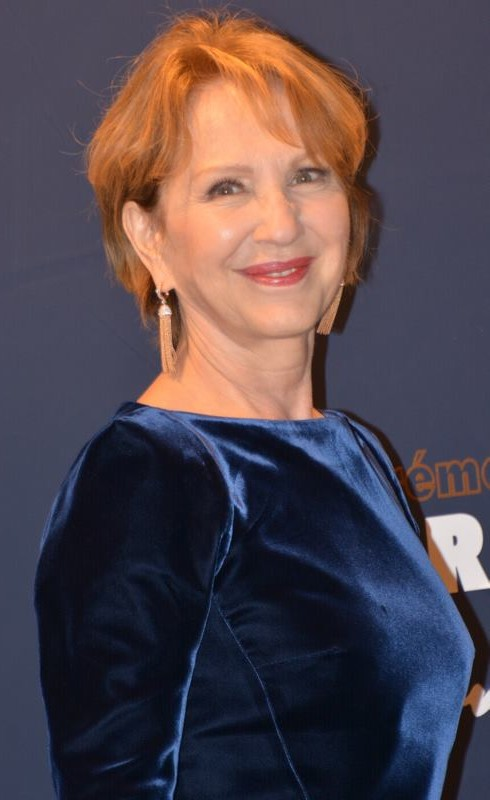
Nathalie Baye at the 2017 César Awards

After changing her image by playing a streetwalker in La Balance, she widened her scope with more obscure characters in J'ai épousé une ombre (1983) and En toute innocence (1988). In 1986, she returned to the theatre with an interpretation of Adriana Monti.

In 1999, she was voted Best Supporting Actress at Venice Film Festival for Une liaison pornographique and starred in Vénus Beauté (Institut) (2000) by Tonie Marshall which won multiple César Awards including Best Film.

She worked with François Truffaut, Jean-Luc Godard, Claude Chabrol and Steven Spielberg.

== Death ==
Baye died from complications of Lewy body dementia in Paris, on 17 April 2026, at the age of 77.

== Filmography ==
Year	Title	Role	Director	Notes
1970	Au théâtre ce soir	Martine Legrand	Pierre Sabbagh	Episode Les Croulants se portent bien
1972	Two People	Uncredited	Robert Wise	
1973	L'Inconnu		Youri	TV film
1973	Day for Night	Joëlle	François Truffaut	
1974	The Mouth Agape	Nathalie	Maurice Pialat	
1974	La Gifle	Christine	Claude Pinoteau	
1975	Un jour, la fête	Julie	Pierre Sisser	
1975	Cinéma 16	Fabienne	Alain Boudet	Episode Esquisse d'une jeune femme sans dessus-dessous
1976	The Last Woman	The girl with cherries	Marco Ferreri	
1976	Le Plein de super	Charlotte	Alain Cavalier	
1976	Le Voyage de noces	Sophie	Nadine Trintignant	
1976	Mado	Catherine	Claude Sautet	
1977	The Man Who Loved Women	Martine Desdoits	François Truffaut	
1977	Monsieur Papa	Janine	Philippe Monnier	
1977	Solemn Communion	Jeanne Vanderberghe	René Féret	
1977	Les Cinq Dernières Minutes	Gisèle	Guy Séligmann	Episode Une si jolie petite cure
1978	Mon premier amour	Fabienne	Élie Chouraqui	
1978	The Green Room	Cécilia Mandel	François Truffaut	
1978	Sacré farceur	Marianne	Jacques Rouland	TV film
1979	Every Man for Himself	Denise Rimbaud	Jean-Luc Godard	
1979	La Mémoire courte	Judith Mesnil	Eduardo de Gregorio	
1979	Madame Sourdis	Adèle Sourdis	Caroline Huppert	TV film
1980	Je vais craquer	Brigitte Ozendron	François Leterrier	
1980	A Week's Vacation	Laurence Cuers	Bertrand Tavernier	
1980	La Provinciale	Christine	Claude Goretta	
1981	Strange Affair	Nina Coline	Pierre Granier-Deferre	
1981	Beau-père	Charlotte	Bertrand Blier	
1981	L'Ombre rouge	Anna	Jean-Louis Comolli	
1982	The Return of Martin Guerre	Bertrande de Rols	Daniel Vigne	
1982	La Balance	Nicole Danet	Bob Swaim	
1983	J'ai épousé une ombre	Hélène	Robin Davis	
1984	Our Story	Donatienne Pouget / Marie-Thérèse Chatelard / Geneviève Avranches	Bertrand Blier	
1984	Rive droite, rive gauche	Sacha	Philippe Labro	
1985	Détective	Françoise Chenal	Jean-Luc Godard	
1985	Honeymoon	Cécile Carline	Patrick Jamain	
1985	Beethoven's Nephew	Leonore	Paul Morrissey	
1987	De guerre lasse	Alice Mangin	Robert Enrico	
1987	En toute innocence	Catherine	Alain Jessua	
1989	Massacre Play	Bella	Damiano Damiani	
1990	The Man Inside	Christine	Bobby Roth	
1990	C'est la vie	Lena	Diane Kurys	
1990	Every Other Weekend	Camille Valmont	Nicole Garcia	
1990	Le Pinceau à lèvres	Elle	Bruno Chiche	Short film
1992	The Voice	Lorraine	Pierre Granier-Deferre	
1992	The Timekeeper	Madame de Pompadour	Jeff Blyth	
1993	Mensonge	Emma	François Margolin	
1993	Les Contes sauvages	Narrator	Gérald Calderon; Jean-Charles Cuttoli	Uncredited
1993	And the Band Played On	Françoise Barré-Sinoussi	Roger Spottiswoode	TV film
1994	The Machine	Marie Lacroix	François Dupeyron	
1994	François Truffaut : Portraits volés	Herself	Serge Toubiana; Michel Pascal	Documentary
1995	La Mère	The mother	Caroline Bottaro	Short film
1996	Enfants de salaud	Sophie	Tonie Marshall	
1997	Food of Love	Michele	Stephen Poliakoff	
1997	Paparazzi	Nicole	Alain Berberian	
1998	Si je t'aime, prends garde à toi	Muriel	Jeanne Labrune	
1999	Venus Beauty Institute	Angèle	Tonie Marshall	
1999	Une liaison pornographique	she	Frédéric Fonteyne	
2000	To Matthieu	Claire	Xavier Beauvois	
2000	Ça ira mieux demain	Sophie	Jeanne Labrune	
2001	Absolutely Fabulous	Patsy	Gabriel Aghion	
2001	Barnie et ses petites contrariétés	Lucie Barnich	Bruno Chiche	
2002	L'Enfant des lumières	Diane	Daniel Vigne	TV film
2002	Catch Me If You Can	Paula Abagnale	Steven Spielberg	
2002	The Flower of Evil	Anne Charpin-Vasseur	Claude Chabrol	
2003	Feelings	Carole	Noémie Lvovsky	
2003	France Boutique	Sofia	Tonie Marshall	
2004	Une vie à t'attendre	Jeanne	Thierry Klifa	
2005	L'Un reste, l'autre part	Fanny	Claude Berri	
2005	The Young Lieutenant	Caroline Vaudieu	Xavier Beauvois	
2006	French California	Maguy	Jacques Fieschi	
2006	Tell No One	Elisabeth Feldman	Guillaume Canet	
2006	The Ant Bully	The Queen Ant	John A. Davis	French voice
2006	Mon fils à moi	The mother	Martial Fougeron	
2007	Michou d'Auber	Gisèle	Thomas Gilou	
2007	Acteur	Camille Degas	Jocelyn Quivrin	Short film
2007	The Price to Pay	Odile Ménard	Alexandra Leclère	
2008	A French Gigolo	Judith	Josiane Balasko	
2008	Passe-passe	Irène Montier-Duval	Tonie Marshall	
2008	Les Bureaux de Dieu	Anne	Claire Simon	
2008	Marie-Octobre	Marie-Hélène Dumoulin / Marie-Octobre	Josée Dayan	TV film
2009	Face	Nathalie	Tsai Ming-liang	
2010	Ensemble, c'est trop	Marie-France	Léa Fazer	
2010	H.H. – Hitler à Hollywood	Herself	Frédéric Sojcher	
2010	De vrais mensonges	Maddy	Pierre Salvadori	
2010	Small World	Elisabeth Senn	Bruno Chiche	
2011	Bye Bye	Cécile	Édouard Deluc	Short film
2011	Dormir debout	Véronique	Jean-Luc Perréard	Short film
2011	Je voulais vous dire		Romain Delange	Short film
2011	Le Premier Rôle	Nathalie	Mathieu Hippeau	Short film
2011	À l'abri	The woman	Jérémie Lippmann	Short film
2012	Spin	Anne Visage	Frédéric Tellier	TV series
2012	Laurence Anyways	Julienne Alia	Xavier Dolan	
2013	Queens of the Ring	Colette	Jean-Marc Rudnicki	
2014	Lou! Journal infime	Lou's grandmother	Julien Neel	
2014	L'Affaire SK1	Frédérique Pons	Frédéric Tellier	
2015	The Assistant	Marie-France	Christophe Ali; Nicolas Bonilauri	
2015	Prejudice	Mother	Antoine Cuypers	
2015	Call My Agent !	Herself	Cédric Klapisch	TV series (2 Episodes)
2016	It's Only the End of the World	Martine	Xavier Dolan	
2016	Moka	Marlène	Frédéric Mermoud	
2017	Alibi.com	Madame Martin	Philippe Lacheau	
2017	Les Gardiennes	Hortense Sandrail	Xavier Beauvois	
2018	Nox	Catherine Susini	Mabrouk El Mechri	TV series (6 episodes)
2019	Criminal: France	Caroline Solal	Frédéric Mermoud	TV series (1 episode)
2020	My Best Part (Garçon chiffon)	Bernadette Meyer	Nicolas Maury	
2022	Downton Abbey: A New Era	The dowager Marchioness of Montmirail	Simon Curtis	

== Awards and nominations ==
Year	Title of work	Award	Category	Result
1981	Every Man for Himself	César Award	Best Supporting Actress	Won
1981	A Week's Vacation	César Award	Best Actress	Nominated
1982	Strange Affair	César Award	Best Supporting Actress	Won
1983	La Balance	César Award	Best Actress	Won
1984	J'ai épousé une ombre	César Award	Best Actress	Nominated
1991	Un week-end sur deux	César Award	Best Actress	Nominated
1999	Une liaison pornographique	Venice International Film Festival	Volpi Cup	Won
1999	Une liaison pornographique	European Film Award	Best Actress	Nominated
2000	Venus Beauty Institute	César Award	Best Actress	Nominated
2000	Venus Beauty Institute	Seattle International Film Festival	Best Actress	Won
2004	Les Sentiments	César Award	Best Actress	Nominated
2006	The Young Lieutenant	César Award	Best Actress	Won
2006	The Young Lieutenant	European Film Award	Best Actress	Nominated
2006	The Young Lieutenant	Globes de Cristal Award	Best Actress	Won
2006	Mon fils à moi	San Sebastián International Film Festival	Best Actress	Won
2009	A French Gigolo	Globes de Cristal Award	Best Actress	Nominated
2009	Body of work	Legion of Honour	Chevalier of the legion of Honour	Honored
2012	Body of work	Magritte Award	Honorary Margritte Award	Honored
2017	It's Only the End of the World	Canadian Screen Awards	Best Performance by an Actress in a Supporting Role	Nominated
2017	It's Only the End of the World	César Award	Best Supporting Actress	Nominated
2017	It's Only the End of the World	Riviera International Film Festival	Best Actress	Nominated
2018	Nox	ACS Awards	Best Actress	Nominated
