= Omar Killed Me =

2011 film

- Film poster
- Directed by: Roschdy Zem
- Written by: Jean-Marie Rouart
- Based on: Pourquoi moi ? by: Omar Raddad and Sylvie Lotiron; Omar, la construction d'un coupable; Jean-Marie Rouart
- Produced by: Rachid Bouchareb; Jean Bréhat
- Starring: Sami Bouajila
- Cinematography: Jérôme Alméras
- Edited by: Monica Coleman
- Music by: Alexandre Azaria
- Distributed by: Mars Distribution (France)
- Release date: 22 June 2011 (France)
- Running time: 85 minutes
- Countries: France; Morocco
- Languages: French; Arabic
- Budget: €6.4 million
- Box office: $4.3 million

Omar Killed Me (French: Omar m'a tuer) is a 2011 drama film directed by Roschdy Zem. The film was selected as the Moroccan entry for the Best Foreign Language Film at the 84th Academy Awards. On 18 January 2012, the film was named as one of the nine shortlisted entries for the Oscars. Zem, Olivier Gorce, Rachid Bouchareb and Olivier Lorelle were collectively nominated for the César Award for Best Adaptation and Sami Bouajila was nominated for the César Award for Best Actor.

== Plot ==
The film tells of the events that began in the summer of 1991 when wealthy heiress, Ghislaine Marchal, was found murdered in the basement of her home with the message "Omar M'a Tuer" (grammatically incorrect French, approximately "Omar has kill me") written beside in her own blood. Despite a lack of forensic or DNA evidence, her Moroccan gardener, Omar Raddad, was immediately charged, found guilty and sentenced to 18 years in a French prison. Shocked by the case and convinced of his innocence, journalist Pierre-Emmanuel Vaugrenard moved to Nice to investigate.

== Cast ==
- Sami Bouajila as Omar Raddad
- Denis Podalydès as Pierre-Emmanuel Vaugrenard
- Maurice Bénichou as Jacques Vergès
- Salomé Stévenin as Maud
- Nozha Khouadra as Latifa Raddad
- Pascal Elso as André de Comminges
- Afida Tahri as La mère de Latifa
- Yanis Abdellaoui as Karim enfant
- Ayoub El Mahlili as Karim jeune garçon
- Martial Rivol as Président Djian
- Lounès Tazairt as M. Sheriff (as Lounès Tazaïrt)

== See also ==
- Omar Raddad Affair
- List of submissions to the 84th Academy Awards for Best Foreign Language Film
- List of Moroccan submissions for the Academy Award for Best Foreign Language Film
