= Sophie Cattani =

French actress

Sophie Cattani is a French actress. She appeared in more than thirty films since 2001.

== Filmography ==
Year	Title	Role	Director	Notes
2001	Mère de toxico	The cop	Lucas Belvaux	TV movie
2002	Après la vie	The stupid girl	Lucas Belvaux	
2003	Rire et châtiment	The patient	Isabelle Doval	
2004	Les Montana	Marie	Benoît d'Aubert	TV series (1 episode)
2005	La vie de Michel Muller est plus belle que la vôtre	Elisa	Michel Muller	
2006	La jungle	Christine Moretti	Matthieu Delaporte	
2006	Charlie Says	Séverine	Nicole Garcia	
2006	Jean-Philippe	Jennifer	Laurent Tuel	
2006	P.J.	Trina	Christian François	TV series (1 episode)
2007	The Killer	Sylvia	Cédric Anger	
2007	Dora	Ester	Sergio Basso	Short
2007	Tel père telle fille	Céline	Sylvie Ballyot	Short
2007	L'envie des autres	The lawyer	Miren Pradier	Short
2009	Quelque chose à te dire	Annabelle Celliers	Cécile Telerman	
2009	I'm Glad My Mother Is Alive	Julie Martino	Nathan & Claude Miller	
2009	Une petite zone de turbulences	The nurse	Alfred Lot	
2009	L'échappée belle	The woman	François Tessier	Short
2009	Le commissariat		Michel Andrieu	TV movie
2009	Suite noire	Sandra	Guillaume Nicloux	TV series (1 episode)
2010	13 minutes 44	Sonia	Colas & Mathias Rifkiss	Short
2010	Même si le ciel n'existe pas	Alice	Cécile Chaspoul	Short
2011	Tomboy	The mother	Céline Sciamma	
2011	Polisse	The kidnapper mother	Maïwenn	
2011	Celle que j'attendais	Cathy	Bernard Stora	TV movie
2012	Augustine	Blanche	Alice Winocour	
2012	Chercher le garçon	Emilie	Dorothée Sebbagh	
2012	Heavy Sentimental	The woman	Laure Ballarin	Short
2013	Vandal	Laure	Hélier Cisterne	
2013	Passer l'hiver	Hotel Manager	Aurélia Barbet	
2014	L'Ex de ma vie	Barbara	Dorothée Sebbagh	
2014	Un illustre inconnu	Marion	Matthieu Delaporte	
2015	Dad in Training	The mediator	Cyril Gelblat	
2015	The Great Game	Caroline	Nicolas Pariser	
2015	Pointe noire	Aline	Ludovic Vieuille	Short
2016	Emma	Sophie Lachenal	Alfred Lot	TV series (1 episode)
2016	Capitaine Marleau	Clara Meyer	Josée Dayan	TV series (1 episode)
2016	Les Petits Meurtres d'Agatha Christie	Eve Constantin	Eric Woreth	TV series (1 episode)
2018	Nox	Elsa	Mabrouk El Mechri	TV mini-series
2019	Exfiltrés	Camille	Emmanuel Hamon	
