= 15th Primetime Emmy Awards =

1963 American television programming awards

- Date: May 26, 1963
- Location: Hollywood Palladium, Los Angeles, California
- Presented by: Academy of Television Arts and Sciences
- Hosted by: Annette Funicello; Don Knotts

Highlights
- Most awards: The Defenders (4)
- Most nominations: Alcoa Premiere; The Defenders (7)
- Outstanding Program Achievement in the Field of Humor: The Dick Van Dyke Show
- Outstanding Program Achievement in the Field of Drama: The Defenders
- Outstanding Program Achievement in the Field of Music: Julie and Carole at Carnegie Hall
- Outstanding Program Achievement in the Field of Variety: The Andy Williams Show
- The Program of the Year: The Tunnel

Television/radio coverage
- Network: NBC

The 15th Emmy Awards Ceremony, later known as the 15th Primetime Emmy Awards, were handed out on May 26, 1963. The ceremony was hosted by Annette Funicello and Don Knotts. Winners are listed in bold and series' networks are in parentheses.

The top shows of the night were The Defenders and The Dick Van Dyke Show. Each won for series, directing, and writing in their respective genres. The Defenders led the night in major wins (4) and nominations (7).

== Winners and nominees ==
=== Programs ===
Programs
**Outstanding Program Achievement in the Field of Humor**: **The Dick Van Dyke Show (CBS)**; The Beverly Hillbillies (CBS); The Danny Kaye Show (NBC) (Episode: "Lucille Ball"); McHale's Navy (ABC)	**Outstanding Program Achievement in the Field of Drama**: **The Defenders (CBS)**; Alcoa Premiere (ABC); The Dick Powell Theatre (NBC); The Eleventh Hour (NBC); Naked City (ABC)
**Outstanding Program Achievement in the Field of Variety**: **The Andy Williams Show (NBC)**; Carol and Company (CBS); The Garry Moore Show (CBS); Here's Edie (ABC); The Red Skelton Show (CBS)	**Outstanding Program Achievement in the Field of Panel,** **Quiz or Audience Participation**: **G.E. College Bowl (CBS)**; Password (CBS); To Tell the Truth (CBS)
**Outstanding Achievement in the Field of Documentary Programs**: **The Tunnel (NBC)**; The DuPont Show of the Week (NBC) (Episode: "Emergency Ward"); Project XX (NBC) (Episode: "He is Risen"); The River Nile (NBC); Shakespeare: Soul of an Age (NBC)	**Outstanding Program Achievement in the Field of Children's Programming**: **Walt Disney's Wonderful World of Color (NBC)**; Captain Kangaroo (CBS); Discovery (ABC); Watch Mr. Wizard (NBC); The Shari Lewis Show (NBC); Update (NBC)
**Outstanding Program Achievement** **in the Field of News Commentary or Public Affairs**: **David Brinkley's Journal (NBC)**; ABC Close Up! (ABC); CBS Reports (CBS); Howard K. Smith (ABC); The Twentieth Century (CBS)	**The Program of the Year**: **The Tunnel (NBC)**; Alcoa Premiere (ABC): "The Voice of Charlie Pont"; The Danny Kaye Show (NBC): "Lucille Ball"; The Defenders (CBS): "The Madman"

=== Acting ===
==== Lead performances ====
Acting
**Outstanding Continued Performance by an Actor in a Series (Lead)**: **E.G. Marshall as Lawrence Preston in The Defenders (CBS)**; Ernest Borgnine as Lt. Commander Quinton McHale in McHale's Navy (ABC); Paul Burke as Det. Adam Flint in Naked City (ABC); Vic Morrow as Sgt. Saunders in Combat! (ABC); Dick Van Dyke as Rob Petrie in The Dick Van Dyke Show (CBS)	**Outstanding Continued Performance by an Actress in a Series (Lead)**: **Shirley Booth as Hazel Burke in Hazel (NBC)**; Lucille Ball as Lucy Carmichael in The Lucy Show (CBS); Shirl Conway as Liz Thorpe in The Doctors and the Nurses (CBS); Mary Tyler Moore as Laura Petrie in The Dick Van Dyke Show (CBS); Irene Ryan as Granny in The Beverly Hillbillies (CBS)

==== Supporting performances ====
**Outstanding Performance in a Supporting Role by an Actor**: **Don Knotts as Deputy Barney Fife in The Andy Griffith Show (CBS)**; Tim Conway as Ensign Charles Parker in McHale's Navy (ABC); Paul Ford as Col. Wainwright Purdy III in Hallmark Hall of Fame (NBC) (Episode: "The Teahouse of the August Moon"); Hurd Hatfield as Lionel Rothschild in Hallmark Hall of Fame (NBC) (Episode: "Invincible Mr. Disraeli"); Robert Redford as George Laurents in Alcoa Premiere (ABC) (Episode: "The Voice of Charlie Pont")	**Outstanding Performance in a Supporting Role by an Actress**: **Glenda Farrell as Martha Morrison in Ben Casey (ABC) (Episode: "A Cardinal Act of Mercy")**; Davey Davison as Laura Hunter in The Eleventh Hour (NBC) (Episode: "Of Roses and Nightingales and Other Lovely Things"); Nancy Malone as Libby Kingston in Naked City (ABC); Rose Marie as Sally Rogers in The Dick Van Dyke Show (CBS); Kate Reid as Queen Victoria in Hallmark Hall of Fame (NBC) (Episode: "Invincible Mr. Disraeli")

==== Single performances ====
**Outstanding Single Performance by an Actor in a Leading Role**: **Trevor Howard as Benjamin Disraeli in Hallmark Hall of Fame (NBC): "Invincible Mr. Disraeli"**; Bradford Dillman as Charlie Pont in Alcoa Premiere (ABC): "The Voice of Charlie Pont"; Don Gordon as Joey Tassili in The Defenders (CBS): "The Madman"; Walter Matthau as Meredith in The DuPont Show of the Week (NBC): "Big Deal in Laredo"; Joseph Schildkraut as Rabbi Gottlieb in Sam Benedict (NBC): "Hear the Mellow Wedding Bells"	**Outstanding Single Performance by an Actress in a Leading Role**: **Kim Stanley as Faith Parsons in Ben Casey (ABC): "A Cardinal Act of Mercy"**; Diahann Carroll as Ruby Jay in Naked City (ABC): "A Horse Has A Big Head, Let Him Worry"; Diana Hyland as Liza Laurents in Alcoa Premiere (ABC): "The Voice of Charlie Pont"; Eleanor Parker as Connie Folsom in The Eleventh Hour (NBC): "Why Am I Grown So Cold?"; Sylvia Sidney as Adela in The Defenders (CBS): "The Madman"

=== Directing ===
Directing
**Outstanding Directorial Achievement in Comedy**: **The Dick Van Dyke Show (CBS) – John Rich**; The Beverly Hillbillies (CBS) – Richard Whorf; The Garry Moore Show (CBS) – Dave Geisel; The Jack Benny Show (CBS) – Frederick De Cordova; The Red Skelton Show (CBS) – Seymour Berns	**Outstanding Directorial Achievement in Drama**: **The Defenders (CBS): "The Madman" – Stuart Rosenberg**; Alcoa Premiere (ABC): "The Voice of Charlie Pont" – Robert Ellis Miller; Ben Casey (ABC): "A Cardinal Act of Mercy" – Sydney Pollack; The DuPont Show of the Week (NBC): "Big Deal in Laredo" – Fielder Cook; Hallmark Hall of Fame (NBC): "Invincible Mr. Disraeli" – George Schaefer

=== Writing ===
Writing
**Outstanding Writing Achievement in Comedy**: **The Dick Van Dyke Show (CBS) – Carl Reiner**; The Beverly Hillbillies (CBS) – Paul Henning; Car 54, Where Are You? (NBC) – Nat Hiken; The Jack Benny Show (CBS) – Sam Perrin, Hal Goldman, Al Gordon and George Balzer; The Red Skelton Show (CBS) – Ed Simmons, Dave O'Brien, Martin Ragaway, Arthur Phillips, Larry Rhine, Mort Greene, Hugh Wedlock Jr., Red Skelton, Bruce Howard and Rick Mittleman	**Outstanding Writing Achievement in Drama**: **The Defenders (CBS): "The Madman" – Reginald Rose and Robert Thom**; Alcoa Premiere (ABC): "The Voice of Charlie Pont" – Halsted Welles; Ben Casey (ABC): "A Cardinal Act of Mercy" – Norman Katkov; The DuPont Show of the Week (NBC): "Big Deal in Laredo" – Sidney Carroll; Hallmark Hall of Fame (NBC): "Invincible Mr. Disraeli" – James Lee

== Most major nominations ==
Networks with multiple major nominations (Note: "Major" constitutes the categories listed above: Program, Acting, Directing, and Writing. Does not include the technical categories.)
Network	Number of Nominations
CBS	34
NBC	30
ABC	23

Programs with multiple major nominations
Program	Category	Network	Number of Nominations
Alcoa Premiere	Drama	ABC	7
The Defenders	Drama	CBS	7
The Dick Van Dyke Show	Comedy	CBS	6
Hallmark Hall of Fame	Drama	NBC	6
Ben Casey	Drama	ABC	4
The Beverly Hillbillies	Comedy	CBS	4
The DuPont Show of the Week	Documentary/Drama	NBC	4
Naked City	Drama	ABC	4
The Eleventh Hour	Drama	NBC	3
McHale's Navy	Comedy	ABC	3
The Red Skelton Show	Comedy/Variety	CBS	3
The Danny Kaye Show	Comedy	NBC	2
The Garry Moore Show	Variety	CBS	2
The Tunnel	Documentary	NBC	2

== Most major awards ==
Networks with multiple major awards
Network	Number of Awards
CBS	9
NBC	7
ABC	2

Programs with multiple major awards
Program	Category	Network	Number of Awards
The Defenders	Drama	CBS	4
The Dick Van Dyke Show	Comedy	CBS	3
Ben Casey	Drama	ABC	2
The Tunnel	Documentary	NBC	2
