= The Price of Fame (2014 film) =

2014 film

- Film poster
- Directed by: Xavier Beauvois
- Written by: Xavier Beauvois; Étienne Comar
- Produced by: Pascal Caucheteux; Étienne Comar; Pauline Gygax
- Starring: Benoît Poelvoorde; Roschdy Zem; Séli Gmach; Chiara Mastroianni; Nadine Labaki; Peter Coyote
- Cinematography: Caroline Champetier
- Edited by: Marie-Julie Maille
- Music by: Michel Legrand
- Production companies: Why Not Productions; Rita Productions; Les Films du Fleuve; Arches Films; France 3 Cinéma; RTS Radio Télévision Suisse; RTBF – Télévision Belge
- Distributed by: Mars Distribution
- Release dates: 28 August 2014 (Venice); 7 January 2015 (France)
- Running time: 114 minutes
- Country: France
- Language: French
- Budget: $8.2 million
- Box office: $372,165

The Price of Fame (French: La Rançon de la gloire) is a 2014 French comedy-drama film written and directed by Xavier Beauvois with an original score by composer Michel Legrand. The film was inspired by the true story about two marginalized immigrants who dug up Charlie Chaplin's coffin for ransom money in the 1970s. Its world premiere was 28 August 2014, directly competing for the Golden Lion at the 71st Venice International Film Festival. It was released on 7 January 2015 in France.

== Plot ==
The story, inspired by actual events, takes place in 1977 in the Swiss town of Vevey, on Lake Geneva. Eddy, a 40-year-old thug, has just been released from the prison. In order to stay in his friend Osman's trailer, Eddy will have to take care of Osman's 7-year-old daughter Samira as Osman's wife Noor is hospitalized. It is the Christmas season, but the trio finds it hard to make ends meet and so, a crazy idea strikes Eddy when a news flash announces the death of Charlie Chaplin: they will steal the famous actor's coffin and demand a ransom from the family.

== Cast ==
- Benoît Poelvoorde as Eddy Ricaart
- Roschdy Zem as Osman Bricha
- Séli Gmach as Samira Bricha
- Chiara Mastroianni as Rosa
- Nadine Labaki as Noor Bricha
- Peter Coyote as John Crooker
- Xavier Maly as Inspector Maltaverne
- Arthur Beauvois as The young Inspector
- Dolores Chaplin as Mademoiselle Chaplin
- Xavier Beauvois as Monsieur Loyal
- Philippe Laudenbach as The prosecutor
- Adel Bencherif as Osman's Friend
- Olivier Rabourdin as The medecin
- Eugène Chaplin as Circus director
- Macha Méril as Oona Chaplin (voice)
- Marilyne Canto as The secretary
- Louis-Do de Lencquesaing as The lawyer
- Isabelle Caillat as The nurse
