= The Voice (1992 film) =

- Directed by: Pierre Granier-Deferre
- Written by: Pierre Granier-Deferre; Christine Miller
- Based on: Pierre Drieu La Rochelle
- Produced by: Patricia Novat; Pierre Novat
- Starring: Sami Frey; Nathalie Baye
- Cinematography: Pascal Lebègue
- Edited by: Marie Castro
- Music by: Philippe Sarde
- Production company: Ciné Feel
- Distributed by: Acteurs Auteurs Associés
- Release dates: February 1992 (Berlinale); 4 March 1992
- Running time: 86 minutes
- Country: France
- Language: French

The Voice (French: La voix) is a 1992 French drama film directed by Pierre Granier-Deferre, starring Sami Frey and Nathalie Baye. Based on a short story by Pierre Drieu La Rochelle, it tells the story of a man who is transfixed when he hears the voice of a woman he once was in love with. It was shown in the Panorama section of the 42nd Berlin International Film Festival.

== Plot ==
Arriving back in Rome after a business trip, Gilles contacts Lorraine and they make hasty love in the open among the ruins. Agreeing to meet again that evening at a rooftop restaurant, Gilles is hopelessly distracted by a voice he hears at another table. It is Laura, a married woman he had a passionate affair with, and he tells Lorraine the whole story, from first joyous encounter to her final suicide attempt. While Lorraine has no desire to hear all the details, she reluctantly lets Gilles get his memories out of his system. After the meal, though he is exhausted by the recalled emotion, she joins him in his bedroom.

== Cast ==
- Sami Frey as Gilles
- Nathalie Baye as Lorraine
- Laura Morante as Laura
- Jean-Claude Dreyfus as Head waiter
- Georges Claisse as Michele
