= The Killer (2007 film) =

- Film poster
- French: Le Tueur
- Directed by: Cédric Anger
- Written by: Cédric Anger
- Produced by: Saïd Ben Saïd; Thomas Klotz
- Starring: Gilbert Melki; Grégoire Colin; Mélanie Laurent; Sophie Cattani
- Cinematography: Caroline Champetier
- Edited by: Julien Leloup
- Music by: Grégoire Hetzel
- Production companies: SBS Films; Sunrise Films
- Distributed by: UGC Distribution
- Release dates: 10 November 2007 (Estoril); 9 January 2008 (France)
- Running time: 91 minutes
- Country: France
- Language: French
- Budget: $1.7 million
- Box office: $320.000

The Killer (French: Le Tueur) is a 2007 French thriller film directed by Cédric Anger.

== Plot ==
It is Christmas Eve in Paris. Leo Zimmerman is a businessman who lives for his beloved little daughter's smile. Outwardly, his life is exemplary. However, when Dimitri Kopas walks into his office, pretending to be a normal client, Leo understands that a contract is out on his head and that the young man has come to town to kill him. Overcome with anxiety and paranoia, no longer able to sleep, Leo decides to meet the killer face to face and to broker a strange deal.

== Cast ==
- Gilbert Melki as Léo
- Grégoire Colin as Kopas
- Mélanie Laurent as Stella
- Sophie Cattani as Sylvia
- Xavier Beauvois as Franzen
- Jeanne Allard as Alana

== Festivals ==
- European Film Festival in Estoril
- Athens French Film Festival
- Rotterdam International Film Festival
- FilmFest München
- Los Angeles Festival City of Lights, City of Angels
- Karlovy Vary International Film Festival (Variety Critic's Choice)
- Fantasia International Film Festival in Montréal
- Nominated Louis-Delluc Award for Best First Film
