= Don't Forget You're Going to Die =

1995 film by Xavier Beauvois

- Film poster
- Directed by: Xavier Beauvois
- Written by: Xavier Beauvois; Emmanuel Salinger; Anne-Marie Sauzeau; Marie Sauzeau; Zoubir Tligui
- Produced by: Christopher Lambert
- Starring: Xavier Beauvois
- Cinematography: Caroline Champetier
- Edited by: Agnès Guillemot
- Music by: John Cale
- Production companies: Why Not Productions; La Sept Cinéma; AFCL Productions; Peripheria
- Distributed by: PolyGram Film Distribution
- Release dates: May 1995 (Cannes); 3 January 1996 (France)
- Running time: 118 minutes
- Country: France
- Language: French
- Budget: € 3.6 million

Don't Forget You're Going to Die (French: N'oublie pas que tu vas mourir, French pronunciation: [nubli pa kə ty va muʁiʁ]) is a 1995 French drama film directed, co-written by and starring Xavier Beauvois.

== Plot ==
Benoit (Xavier Beauvois) has planned out his life. Unfortunately he has forgotten about National Service. After he is called up, he tries everything to get around. He goes to a psychiatrist who gives him medicine against depression. As this doesn't work out he tries suicide. The story gets even worse as he is told by a military doctor that he is HIV positive. Benoit tumbles down into the drug scene. Then he goes to Italy and meets Claudia (Chiara Mastroianni). Things seem to improve, but only for a short time...

== Cast ==
- Xavier Beauvois as Benoît
- Chiara Mastroianni as Claudia
- Roschdy Zem as Omar
- Bulle Ogier as Benoît's Mother
- Jean-Louis Richard as Benoît's Father
- Emmanuel Salinger as Military Doctor
- Jean Douchet as Jean-Paul
- Pascal Bonitzer as Psychiatrist
- Cédric Kahn as Benoît's Friend
- Stanislas Nordey as Benoît's Friend
- Patrick Chauvel as Military Commander
- Denis Psaltospoulos as Patient

== Soundtrack ==
The soundtrack was composed and largely performed by John Cale, and was subsequently released as an album.

== Accolades ==
The film won the Jury Prize at the 1995 Cannes Film Festival.
