= French California =

La Californie
- Directed by: Jacques Fieschi
- Screenplay by: Jacques Fieschi
- Based on: Chemin sans issue by Georges Simenon
- Produced by: Christine Gozlan; Edouard Weil
- Starring: Nathalie Baye; Roschdy Zem; Ludivine Sagnier
- Cinematography: Jérôme Alméras
- Edited by: Luc Barnier
- Music by: Mino Cinélu
- Production companies: Rectangle Productions; Thelma Films; France 3 Cinéma
- Distributed by: Mars Distribution
- Release dates: 26 May 2006 (Cannes); 25 October 2006 (France)
- Running time: 105 minutes
- Country: France
- Language: French
- Budget: €4 million
- Box office: $608.000

French California (French: La Californie) is a 2006 French film directed and written by Jacques Fieschi, based on short story by Georges Simenon. It was nominated for César Awards for Best Supporting Actress (Mylène Demongeot) and Most Promising Actor (Radivoje Bukvic). It was screened in the Un Certain Regard section at the 2006 Cannes Film Festival.

== Cast ==
- Nathalie Baye as Maguy
- Roschdy Zem as Mirko
- Ludivine Sagnier as Helène
- Mylène Demongeot as Katia
- Radivoje Bukvic as Stefan
- Xavier De Guillebon as Francis
- Caroline Ducey as Lila

== Accolades ==
Award / Film Festival	Category	Recipients and nominees	Result
Cannes Film Festival	Prix Un certain regard		Nominated
Cannes Film Festival	Caméra d'Or		Nominated
César Awards	Best Supporting Actress	Mylène Demongeot	Nominated
César Awards	Most Promising Actor	Rasha Bukvic	Nominated
