= Big Deal in Laredo =

- DuPont Show of the Week episode
- Episode no.: Season 2 Episode 3
- Directed by: Fielder Cook
- Written by: Sidney Carroll
- Original air date: October 7, 1962

Guest appearances
- Teresa Wright as Mary; Walter Matthau as Meredith

Episode chronology
← Previous "Fire Rescue"	Next → "The Betrayal"

"Big Deal in Laredo" was an American television play broadcast by NBC on October 7, 1962, as part of the television series, DuPont Show of the Week. The production was nominated for Emmy Awards for outstanding single performance by an actor in a leading role (Walter Matthau), outstanding directorial achievement (Fielder Cook), and outstanding writing achievement in drama Sidney Carroll).

== Plot ==
While traveling in 1899 with his wife Mary (played by Teresa Wright), Meredith (played by Walter Matthau), a transient farmer, encounters a high-stakes poker game at the Palomar Hotel in Laredo, Texas. The game is between the four richest cattle barons in Texas. One of the four participants, Habershaw, invites Meredith, his wife, and son to watch. Eventually, Meredith is permitted to join the game. After a series of losing hands, Meredith draws an unbeatable hand but suffers a heart attack and collapses. Mary picks up the hand and asks, "How do you play this game?" The local banker gives her a loan to allow her to play the hand, and she wins a huge pot. It is later revealed that Mary and Meredith have run a con.

== Cast ==
The cast included performances by:

- Teresa Wright as Mary
- Walter Matthau as Meredith
- John McGiver as C. P. Ballinger
- Zachary Scott as Habershaw
- Roland Winters as Drummond
- John Megna as Jackie
- William Hansen as Dr. Scully
- Arthur Hughes as Buford
- James Kenny as Sam
- Dana Elcar as Wilcox

== Production ==
The production was broadcast on NBC on October 7, 1962, as part of the DuPont Show of the Week. Fielder Cook was the director. The cast was led by Walter Matthau and Teresa Wright. It was written by Sidney Carroll who described it as "a Western without guns or horses, set against a legendary poker hand and an entire family which becomes involved in a bizarre way in the biggest poker game that ever came down the pike."

In May 1963, the production received three nomination for the 15th Primetime Emmy Awards. The nominations were for Walter Matthau as outstanding single performance by an actor in a leading role, Fielder Cook for outstanding directorial achievement, and Sidney Carroll for outstanding writing achievement in drama.
