= Mainneville =

- Commune
- Location of Mainneville
- Location within France Location within Normandy
- Coordinates: 49°22′26″N 1°41′01″E
- Country: France
- Region: Normandy
- Department: Eure
- Arrondissement: Les Andelys
- Canton: Romilly-sur-Andelle

Government
  - Mayor (2021–2026): Alexis Louise
- Area^{1}: 8.14 km^{2} (3.14 sq mi)
- Elevation: 94 m (308 ft)
- Highest elevation: 163 m (535 ft)
- Lowest elevation: 81 m (266 ft)
- Population (2023): 445
  - Density: 54.7/km^{2} (142/sq mi)
- Time zone: UTC+01:00 (CET)
  - Summer (DST): UTC+02:00 (CEST)
- INSEE/Postal code: 27379 /27150
- ^{1} French Land Register data, which excludes lakes, ponds, glaciers > 1 km^{2} (0.386 sq mi or 247 acres) and river estuaries.

Mainneville (French pronunciation: [mɛnvil]) is a commune in the Eure department in Normandy in northern France.

== Population ==
Historical population
Year	Pop.	±% p.a.
1968	350	—
1975	322	−1.18%
1982	334	+0.52%
1990	370	+1.29%
1999	395	+0.73%
2007	409	+0.44%
2012	435	+1.24%
2017	425	−0.46%
2023	445	+0.77%
Source: INSEE

== People ==
- Nathalie Baye (1948–2026), actress

== See also ==
- Communes of the Eure department
