= I'm Glad My Mother Is Alive =

- Directed by: Claude Miller; Nathan Miller
- Screenplay by: Claude Miller; Nathan Miller; Emmanuel Carrère; Alain Le Henry
- Produced by: Jean-Louis Livi; Jacques Audiard; Alain Vannier
- Starring: Vincent Rottiers; Sophie Cattani; Christine Citti
- Cinematography: Aurélien Devaux
- Edited by: Morgane Spacagna
- Music by: Vincent Segal
- Production companies: France 3 Cinéma; F Comme Film; Orly Films; Page 114
- Distributed by: Metropolitan Filmexport
- Release date: 30 September 2009
- Running time: 91 minutes
- Country: France
- Language: French
- Budget: $4.3 million
- Box office: $385.000

I'm Glad My Mother Is Alive (French: Je suis heureux que ma mère soit vivante) is a 2009 French film directed by Claude Miller and Nathan Miller. It is based on an article by Emmanuel Carrère.

== Plot ==
Thomas, an adopted teenager and uncomfortable, goes in search of his past to understand why his mother abandoned him and his brother when he was 4 years old. He searches for his mother without telling either his brother or his adoptive parents. He then discovers that she is no longer with her biological father, that she had a third son with another man, and that she now lives alone with her other son.

== Cast ==
- Vincent Rottiers as Thomas Jouvet
- Sophie Cattani as Julie Martino
- Christine Citti as Annie Jouvet
- Yves Verhoeven as Yves Jouvet
- Olivier Guéritée as Patrick / François
- Gabin Lefebvre as Tommy
- Quentin Gonzalez as Frédéric
- Chantal Banlier as Chantal Duronnet
- Thomas Momplot as Mathieu
- Samir Guesmi as The employer
- Sabrina Ouazani as The cinema cashier
- Carole Franck as The orphanage's director

== Production ==
The movie was presented in several festival like the Montreal World Film Festival, the Venice Film Festival, the Festival do Rio, and the San Francisco International Film Festival.

== Critical reception ==
The film was well received by the critics. Review aggregator Rotten Tomatoes reports that 92% of 13 critics gave the film a positive review, for an average rating of 7.4/10.

== Accolades ==
Year	Award	Category	Recipient	Result
2009	Montreal World Film Festival	Best Screenplay	Alain Le Henry	Won
2009	Montreal World Film Festival	Grand Prix des Amériques	Claude Miller & Nathan Miller	Nominated
2010	César Award	Most Promising Actor	Vincent Rottiers	Nominated
