= Sansa (film) =

- Film poster
- Directed by: Siegfried
- Written by: Siegfried
- Produced by: Siegfried
- Starring: Roschdy Zem; Ivry Gitlis
- Music by: SIG
- Production companies: ARTE France & Vagabondages
- Release dates: 16 May 2003 (Cannes); 28 January 2004 (France)
- Running time: 116 minutes
- Country: France

Sansa is a 2003 French film directed by Siegfried, starring Roschdy Zem. Siegfried also composed music for his film together with violinist Ivry Gitlis who play own role in the film. Original release summary: "Les aventures rocambolesques de Sansa à travers le monde" (Sansa's incredible adventures around the world).

== Plot ==
Artist/writer/director/producer Siegfried follows a street hustler/artist Sansa (Roschdy Zem) who makes his way from Paris to Russia using his street smarts. Sansa is charming and careless, living the bohemian life. His encounters are numerous, mostly with feminine characters, until he gets attached to an old and eccentric orchestra conductor (Ivry Gitlis) who becomes a kind of father figure.

Sansa's peregrinations start in Montmartre, then follow with a succession of international clichés. In Italy, we "learn" that women have dark hair and are beautiful while men are machos; we even to get to enjoy a Vespa chase. Russia is the land of chaos and organized crime where everybody gets drunk with vodka. Africa is corrupted, India is about people going naked in the river and Egypt has pyramids. Meanwhile, our hero Sansa, who is the victim of police abuse anywhere he goes, is unstoppable, seducing women around the world, like a backpacking James Bond, jumping from one train to another, escaping trouble, running into friends everywhere he goes, and walking, his hands in his pockets, through the great icy lands of Russia and the Moroccan desert.

In the end, despite following him for thousands of kilometres around the world, Sansa didn't go anywhere.

"France, Spain, Italie, Hungary, Russia, India, Japan, Egypt, Portugal, Ghana, Burkina Faso...
Passing through frontiers... No controls...

Sansa is free. He loves women. Has love affairs. He's walking observing the world.

A symphony of faces, unforgettable meetings... There is Click, the conductor...
There is Sansa and Click. They're having fun...
They let themselves be guided by the music..."

—Siegfried (About Sansa)

== Cast ==
- Roschdy Zem - Sansa
- Ivry Gitlis - Monsieur Click
- Emma Suárez - Emita
- Silke - Paloma
- Valentina Cervi - Valentina
- Rita Durão - Chloé
- Ayako Fujitani - June
- Georges Abe - Georges
- Bassem Samra - Ahmed
- Amar Attia - Le CRS
- Martha Argerich - herself

== Awards ==
The film won Youth Jury Award at Ghent International Film Festival (2003). And also it was nominated for the Grand Prix of Sofia International Film Festival (2004).
