= Drift Away (film) =

French drama film written and directed by Xavier Beauvois

- French: Albatros
- Directed by: Xavier Beauvois
- Screenplay by: Xavier Beauvois
- Produced by: Sylvie Pialat; Benoit Quainon
- Starring: Jérémie Renier; Marie-Julie Maille; Victor Belmondo
- Production company: Les Films du Worso
- Release date: March 1, 2021 (Berlinale)
- Country: France
- Language: French

Drift Away (French: Albatros) is a 2021 French drama film written and directed by Xavier Beauvois. The film stars Jérémie Renier, Marie-Julie Maille and Victor Belmondo.

The film had its worldwide premiere at the 71st Berlin International Film Festival in March 2021. It is a Les Films du Worso production.

== Cast ==
The cast include:

- Jérémie Renier as Laurent
- Marie-Julie Maille as Marie
- Victor Belmondo
- Iris Bry
- Geoffrey Sery as Julien
- Olivier Pequery
- Madeleine Beauvois

== Release ==
On February 11, 2021, Berlinale announced that the film would have its worldwide premiere at the 71st Berlin International Film Festival in the Berlinale Competition section, in March 2021.
