= Utilities (film) =

- Directed by: Harvey Hart
- Written by: David Greenwalt; Jim Kouf
- Produced by: Jon Davison; Howard W. Koch
- Starring: Robert Hays; Brooke Adams; John Marley; James Blendick; Helen Burns; Jane Mallett
- Cinematography: Richard Leiterman
- Edited by: John Kelly
- Music by: Micky Erbe; Maribeth Solomon
- Distributed by: New World Pictures
- Release date: June 1983
- Running time: 94 minutes
- Country: Canada
- Language: English
- Budget: $6,000,000 CAD$ (estimated)

Utilities is a 1983 Canadian comedy film directed by Harvey Hart and starring Robert Hays and Brooke Adams.

== Plot ==
Bob Hunt, a social worker, has a client, Dr. Martha Louise Rogers, whose electricity is cut off because she cannot pay the bill. She is assisted by contributions by her neighbors and friends, and the bill is paid entirely in coins, though the clerk is belatedly told that payment is not accepted in such a large quantity of coins.

Unfortunately, the electric company fails to reconnect the power due to a communications snafu, and the elderly woman is taken to hospital suffering hypothermia.

Hunt sets off on a vendetta of revenge, sabotaging assorted support systems. Attempting to evade detection at one site, he flattens himself against the wall with wet paint, with a finger sticking up, and leaving the impression of a hand with one raised finger in the paint. The news media find out this detail and the unknown saboteur is nicknamed "The Finger."

When the phone company is hit, it issues a public statement denying that, due to the sabotage to its billing records, long-distance calls can be made without a charge. Promptly, the movie depicts people making outrageous use of long distance, which in 1981 was still quite expensive. One girl calls overseas and plays a Styx double album over the phone.

In a long, climactic courtroom hearing, a rate-hike proposal by Kenneth Knight and his utility company, Eastern Gas & Electric, is to be voted on by a public commission. But first a number of protesting citizens are given an opportunity to speak, followed by Hunt, who confesses: "I am The Finger." At that point, many others in the courtroom, Spartacus-style, rise to claim they are The Finger.

Just as the commission is about to approve E, G & E's rate increase, police officer Marion Edwards bursts in, there to make an arrest. Hunt expects to be placed in handcuffs, but she reveals that Knight has been destroying his own substations in an effort to achieve public sympathy. The lights of the city go dark as spectators in the courthouse celebrate.

== Cast ==
- Robert Hays as Bob Hunt
- Brooke Adams as Marion Edwards
- John Marley as Roy Blue
- James Blendick as Kenneth Knight
- Tony Rosato as Wendell
