= Antoine Chappey =

French actor (born 1960)

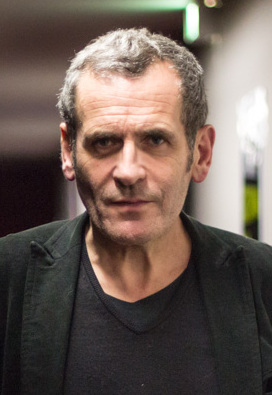
- Chappey in 2013
- Born: 1960 (age 65–66); France
- Occupation: Actor
- Years active: 1989–present

Antoine Chappey (born 1960) is a French actor. He has appeared in over 80 films and television shows since 1989. He starred in the film Nelly, which was screened in the Un Certain Regard section at the 2004 Cannes Film Festival.

== Selected filmography ==
- The Letter (1999)
- To Matthieu (2000)
- The Milk of Human Kindness (2001)
- I'm Going Home (2001)
- Nelly (2004)
- The Hook (2004)
- The Young Lieutenant (2005)
- La Maison du Bonheur (2006)
- Mark of an Angel (2008)
- Iris in Bloom (2011)
- The Great Game (2015)
- Fool Moon (2016)
- C'est la vie ! (2017)
- Drops of God (2023)
