= Li3 =

Li3 or LI3 may refer to:

- Li3 (software), a full-stack web framework for producing web applications
- Lithium (_{3}Li), an isotope of oxygen, a chemical element with symbol Li and atomic number 3
  - Lithium-3 (Li-3 or ^{3}Li), a hypothetical isotope of lithium with no neutrons
- "Trilithium", a fictional chemical compound in Star Trek
- "Less interesting three" (LI3), nickname for Aerosmith members Tom Hamilton, Joey Kramer, and Brad Whitford (those not in the "Toxic Twins")
- Li-3 GmbH (Li-3 GmbH) Company in Germany

== See also ==
- LIE (disambiguation)
