= Louise (Take 2) =

- Directed by: Siegfried
- Written by: Siegfried
- Produced by: Jean Cazes
- Starring: Élodie Bouchez
- Cinematography: Vincent Buron
- Edited by: Hervé Schneid
- Release date: September 1998
- Running time: 115 minutes
- Country: France
- Language: French
- Budget: $2.6 million
- Box office: $170.000

Louise (Take 2) is a 1998 French drama film directed by Siegfried. It was screened in the Un Certain Regard section at the 1998 Cannes Film Festival.

== Cast ==
- Élodie Bouchez - Louise
- Roschdy Zem - Rémi
- Gérald Thomassin - Yaya
- Antoine du Merle - Gaby
- Bruce Myers - The Hobo
- Naguime Bendidi - Bestopaz
- Abdel Houari - Selem
- Lou Castel - Louise's Father
- Véronique Octon - Leila
- Yvette Jean - Maman Yvette
- Johanna Mergirie - Johanna
- Véra Briole - Social worker
- Philippe Ambrosini - Police inspector
- Nozha Khouadra - Shop attendant
- Patrick Lizana - Pharmacist
- Tonio Descanvelle - Waiter at Luxembourg
- Eriq Ebouaney
