= The Assistant (2015 film) =

- Film poster
- Directed by: Christophe Ali; Nicolas Bonilauri
- Written by: Christophe Ali; Nicolas Bonilauri; Jacques Sotty; Philippe Blasband
- Produced by: Tom Dercourt; Donato Rotunno
- Starring: Nathalie Baye; Malik Zidi
- Cinematography: Nicolas Massart
- Edited by: Ewin Ryckaert
- Music by: Jérôme Lemonnier
- Production companies: Cinéma Defacto; Artémis Productions; Tarantula Luxembourg
- Distributed by: Bac Films (France)
- Release dates: 15 June 2015 (Champs-Élysées); 2 September 2015 (France)
- Running time: 87 minutes
- Countries: France; Belgium; Luxembourg
- Language: French

The Assistant (original title: La Volante) is a 2015 drama-thriller film directed by Christophe Ali and Nicolas Bonilauri and starring Nathalie Baye and Malik Zidi.

== Plot ==
One night, while driving his pregnant wife Audrey to the hospital, Thomas accidentally hits and kills a young man on the road. Several years later, Marie-France, the bereaved mother of the deceased is still unable to recover from the tragedy. She becomes a personal assistant for Thomas, who remains completely unaware of her identity. Soon, Marie-France carries out a methodical plan, making herself become indispensable to Thomas, while interfering in his family affairs and also approaching his son Léon.

== Cast ==
- Nathalie Baye as Marie-France Ducret
- Malik Zidi as Thomas Lemans
- Johan Leysen as Éric Lemans
- Sabrina Seyvecou as Audrey Lemans
- Jean Stan Du Pac as Léo Lemans
- Pierre-Alain Chapuis as Jean-Marc
- Hervé Sogne as Pierre
- Aïssatou Diop as Iman
