= To Matthieu =

- Theatrical release poster
- Directed by: Xavier Beauvois
- Written by: Cédric Anger; Xavier Beauvois; Catherine Breillat
- Produced by: Pascal Caucheteux; Alain Sarde
- Starring: Nathalie Baye
- Cinematography: Caroline Champetier
- Edited by: Christophe Nowak
- Production companies: Why Not Productions; Les Films Alain Sarde; Arte France Cinéma; Carrello Productions
- Distributed by: Mars Distribution
- Release dates: 6 September 2000 (Venice); 10 January 2001 (France)
- Country: France
- Language: French
- Budget: $3.6 million
- Box office: $1.6 million

To Matthieu (French: Selon Matthieu) is a 2000 French drama film written and directed by Xavier Beauvois and starring Nathalie Baye.

The film was entered into the main competition at the 57th Venice International Film Festival.

== Cast ==
- Benoît Magimel as Matthieu
- Nathalie Baye as Claire
- Antoine Chappey as Eric
- Fred Ulysse as Francis
- Jean-Marie Winling as The Factory's Owner
- Françoise Bette as Simone
- Mélanie Leray as Dominique
- Virginie Dessèvre as Virginie
