= James Blendick =

Canadian actor

James Blendick is a retired Canadian character actor best known for his 30-year-long association with the Stratford Festival.

== Career ==
Among the productions in which he has performed leads are Much Ado About Nothing, The Cherry Orchard, Waiting For Godot, Juno and the Paycock, Coriolanus, Richard III, Amadeus, The Little Foxes, Cat on a Hot Tin Roof, Midsummer Night's Dream, Twelfth Night and School For Scandal among many others. More recently he appeared in the title role of Titus Andronicus (2000) and as Gonzalo in The Tempest, with Christopher Plummer (2010) at the Stratford Festival.

Blendick has also performed on Broadway (opposite Plummer in Cyrano), at the Guthrie Theater, Minneapolis, at the Old Globe, San Diego and at the Grand Theatre, London. He has also acted extensively in film and television.

== Filmography ==
=== Film ===
Year	Title	Role	Notes
1976	Shoot	Pete	
1980	Cordélia	Bourreau Radcliff	
1980	Resurrection	1st Scientist	
1981	Years of the Beast	Jackson McKifer	
1983	Star 80	Gunseller	
1983	Utilities	Kenneth Knight	
1993	Guilty as Sin	McMartin	
1995	Tommy Boy	Ron Gilmore	
2010	The Tempest	Gonzalo	

=== Television ===
Year	Title	Role	Notes
1966	Julius Caesar	First citizen	Television film
1969	The Three Musketeers	Porthos	Television film
1975	Performance	Matt	Episode: "Lulu Street"
1975	The Invisible Man	Sanders	Episode: "Pin Money"
1976	Police Story	Dr. Molter	Episode: "Oxford Gray"
1977	Mary Hartman, Mary Hartman	Lt. Berman	Episode #1.25
1977	Kojak	Phil Brean	Episode: "Case Without a File"
1978	The Bionic Woman	Carson	Episode: "The Antidote"
1978	Loose Change	Bob O'Brian	Miniseries
1979	Barnaby Jones	Hal Coburn	2 episodes
1979	Crisis in Mid-Air	Irv	Television film
1981	The Other Victim	Mack Fisher	Television film
1981	Star Wars	General Dodonna	2 episodes
1982	Remington Steele	Gutman	Episode: "Thou Shalt Not Steele"
1986	Twelfth Night	Sir Toby Belch	Television film
1989	Alfred Hitchcock Presents	Colonel Stacy	Episode: "Reunion"
1989	The Comedy of Errors	Duke of Ephesus	Television film
1993–1994	Street Legal	Arthur Locke	6 episodes
1994	Incident in a Small Town	Seawright	Television film
1994, 1996	Kung Fu: The Legend Continues	Frank Cooper	2 episodes
1994–1997	X-Men	Apocalypse	7 episodes
1998	Silver Surfer	Galactus	6 episodes
1998–2000	Mythic Warriors	Narrator	26 episodes
