= Night Wind =

- French: Le vent de la nuit
- Directed by: Philippe Garrel
- Written by: Xavier Beauvois; Marc Cholodenko; Philippe Garrel; Arlette Langmann
- Produced by: Alain Sarde
- Starring: Catherine Deneuve
- Cinematography: Caroline Champetier
- Edited by: Françoise Collin
- Music by: John Cale
- Production companies: Why Not Productions; Les Films Alain Sarde; Vega Film; Classic
- Distributed by: Mars Distribution
- Release date: 3 March 1999 (France)
- Running time: 95 minutes
- Countries: France; Italy; Switzerland
- Languages: French; German

Night Wind (French: Le Vent de la nuit) is a French drama film that came out in 1999, starring Catherine Deneuve and directed by Philippe Garrel, with a score by John Cale. It tells a story of transient loves and willed deaths, in which a callow young man abandons an older woman and loses a wiser friend.

== Plot ==
Paul, a young sculptor in Paris who is having an affair with Hélène, a married woman in her fifties, goes to Italy for the unveiling of one of his works. There he meets the laconic Serge, a man in his fifties who is returning alone to Paris in his red Porsche 911 and agrees to take Paul. The two develop a friendship as the immature Paul, who uses recreational drugs, learns from the life story of the world-weary Serge. In fact, viewers learn, Serge's hardened exterior hides his intention of ending his life by taking pills.

Back in Paris, when Paul walks Hélène home after a session in his room, she asks him up to meet her husband. As the husband talks to Paul, she gets increasingly tense and suddenly breaks a wineglass, using a shard to slash her wrist. Paul rigs up a tourniquet while the husband fetches a doctor, who pronounces her safe.

When Serge tells Paul he is driving to Berlin, Paul agrees to ride with him. In the city, Paul picks up a whore while Serge goes to a cemetery. There he visits a grave, which viewers can assume to be that of his wife who committed suicide. Returning to Paris, when Serge drops Paul off outside his building at 11pm, Hélène is waiting on the pavement. The three agree to go to a Chinese restaurant but, when they are served, Paul gets up and goes home. Left alone, Serge and Hélène admit that they like being together. Serge walks her to a hotel nearby, on the way buying some pills at a late-night pharmacy. After they have had sex, the first time for Serge since his wife died, he goes home and takes the pills.

== Cast ==
- Catherine Deneuve: Hélène
- Daniel Duval: Serge
- Xavier Beauvois: Paul
- Jacques Lassalle: Hélène's husband

== Soundtrack ==
The film was scored by former member of the Velvet Underground, John Cale. The soundtrack was performed by Cale with slide-guitarist Mark Deffenbaugh, and was released as an album.
