= Lie (surname) =

As a surname, Lie may refer to

- A Norwegian surname Lie, which may refer to:
  - Anders Danielsen Lie, Norwegian actor
  - Aylar Lie, Iranian-born Norwegian TV personality and professional poker player.
  - Haakon Lie, Norwegian politician
  - Jonas Lie (government minister), Norwegian councillor of state
  - Jonas Lie (painter), Norwegian-American painter
  - Jonas Lie (writer), Norwegian novelist
  - Kaare Lie, Norwegian footballer and journalist
  - Lars Gunnar Lie, Norwegian politician
  - Niels Lie, Danish chess player
  - Reidar Lie, Norwegian philosopher
  - Sophus Lie, Norwegian mathematician
  - Trygve Lie, Norwegian politician, first Secretary-General of the United Nations
- The common Hokkien transcription of Chinese surname Li (李), spelled Lie (Pe̍h-ōe-jī: Lí) in Indonesia and Netherlands:
  - Lie Kim Hok, peranakan Chinese writer, social worker
  - Lie Tek Swie, Indonesian film director
  - Lie Tjeng Tjoan, Indonesian navy commander during the Indonesian National Revolution
  - Lie Kiat Teng, Indonesian doctor and politician
  - Mochtar Riady ( 李文正), Chairman of Lippo Group
  - James Riady (李白), Indonesian Businessman

== See also ==
- Lie (disambiguation)
