= Le Petit Lieutenant =

The Young Lieutenant
- Film poster
- Directed by: Xavier Beauvois
- Written by: Xavier Beauvois; Guillaume Bréaud; Jean-Eric Troubat; Cédric Anger
- Produced by: Pascal Caucheteux
- Starring: Jalil Lespert; Nathalie Baye; Antoine Chappey; Jacques Perrin
- Cinematography: Caroline Champetier
- Edited by: Martine Giordano
- Production companies: Why Not Productions; StudioCanal; France 2 Cinéma
- Distributed by: Mars Distribution
- Release dates: 31 August 2005 (Venice); 16 November 2005 (France)
- Running time: 110 minutes
- Country: France
- Language: French
- Budget: €4.4 million
- Box office: $4 million

Le Petit Lieutenant (also released under the title of The Young Lieutenant) is a 2005 French crime drama film directed by Xavier Beauvois. With almost documentary realism, it shows how in a tragic breach of procedure a young married police lieutenant is killed by a suspect and how the head of his squad doggedly tracks down the killer, who is shot dead trying to escape.

== Plot ==
Graduating from police academy as a lieutenant, Antoine chooses a place on a detective squad in a busy quarter of Paris, leaving his young wife in their home town of Le Havre. Newly in charge of the squad is Caroline who, after losing her young son to meningitis, took to the bottle. Now on her own and recovering, she takes an interest in her keen young assistant and in a quiet moment the two even share a joint.

Two similar incidents are under investigation, involving a Polish man and an English man being beaten, knifed, and thrown into the river. The first man dies but a witness says the assailant was a Russian, while the second man survives and can confirm that it was a Russian. After detective work has narrowed down a possible address for a prime suspect, Antoine and a colleague go to investigate. When the colleague says he needs to go to the toilet in a bar opposite, Antoine proceeds alone and is knifed to death.

Caroline is mortified by the failure of her squad and the loss of a valuable young recruit, while the colleague is sacked. After a bad evening when she buys herself gin and goes to the home of an ex-lover, she recovers her energy and her determination to catch the killer. Long detective work identifies an associate, who is arrested and his mobile phone is monitored. Calls from the killer reveal that he is in Nice. Flying there, Caroline watches the local police storm the building. When the killer leaps from a window, with two shots of her pistol Caroline kills him.

== Cast ==
- Jalil Lespert as Antoine Derouère
- Nathalie Baye as Caroline Vaudieu
- Antoine Chappey as Louis Mallet
- Xavier Beauvois as Nicolas Morbe
- Jacques Perrin as Clermont
- Roschdy Zem as Solo
- Riton Liebman as Jean

== Critical response ==
The Young Lieutenant received generally positive reviews from critics. Review aggregation website Rotten Tomatoes reported an approval rating of 79%, based on 53 reviews, with an average rating of 6.9/10. The site's consensus reads, "A gritty, languidly paced crime drama that blends old-fashioned ambiance with modern cynicism". At Metacritic, which assigns a normalized rating out of 100 to reviews from mainstream critics, the film received an average score of 71, based on 19 reviews, indicating "generally favorable reviews".

== Awards and nominations ==
- César Awards (France)
  - Won: Best Actress – Leading Role (Nathalie Baye)
  - Nominated: Best Actor – Supporting Role (Roschdy Zem)
  - Nominated: Best Director
  - Nominated: Best Film
  - Nominated: Best Original Screenplay (Xavier Beauvois, Guillaume Bréaud and Jean-Eric Troubat)
- European Film Awards
  - Nominated: Best Actress – Leading Role (Nathalie Baye)
- Venice Film Festival (Italy)
  - Won: Label Europa Cinemas (Xavier Beauvois)
