= Every Other Weekend (film) =

- Film poster
- Directed by: Nicole Garcia
- Written by: Jacques Fieschi; Nicole Garcia; Anne-Marie Etienne; Philippe Le Guay
- Produced by: Alain Sarde
- Starring: Nathalie Baye
- Cinematography: William Lubtchansky
- Edited by: Agnès Guillemot; Jacqueline Mariani
- Music by: Oswald d'Andréa
- Distributed by: MK2 Diffusion
- Release date: 29 August 1990
- Running time: 100 minutes
- Country: France
- Language: French

Every Other Weekend (French: Un week-end sur deux) is a 1990 French drama film written and directed by Nicole Garcia. It marked the directorial debut of Garcia.

It premiered out of competition at the 47th Venice International Film Festival. It was nominated for two César Award, for best debut film and for best actress (to Nathalie Baye).

== Synopsis ==
Camille is an actress who has seen better days. After her divorce, her ex-husband was granted custody of their two children. She only gets to see them every other weekend, and this happens to be one of those weekends. However, she has an important obligation to attend a gala at the Rotary Club in Vichy. With no other option, she decides to take her son and daughter along. When her ex-husband finds out, he’s furious and plans to come retrieve the children. Camille, desperate, takes off, heading south with the kids, hoping to build a closer relationship with them—especially with her precocious and distant son, Vincent, who has a passion for astronomy. Camille then discovers that a rare meteor shower is expected in Spain a few days later. She proposes to Vincent that they go...

== Cast ==
- Nathalie Baye : Camille Valmont
- Felice Pasotti : Gaëlle
- Joachim Serreau : Vincent
- Miki Manojlović : Adrian
- Henri Garcin : Camille's Agent
- Marie Daëms : Graziella Jacquet
- Jacques Boudet : Jacquet
- Sacha Briquet : Albert
