= Our Ties =

- Directed by: Roschdy Zem
- Screenplay by: Roschdy Zem; Maïwenn
- Produced by: Pascal Caucheteux
- Starring: Sami Bouajila; Roschdy Zem
- Cinematography: Julien Poupard
- Edited by: Pierre Deschamps
- Music by: Maxence Dussère
- Production companies: Why Not Productions; Hole In One Films
- Distributed by: Le Pacte
- Release date: 2022
- Language: French

Our Ties (French: Les Miens) is a 2022 French drama film co-written, directed and starring Roschdy Zem.

The film was entered into the main competition at the 79th edition of the Venice Film Festival.

== Cast ==
- Sami Bouajila as Moussa
- Roschdy Zem as Ryad
- Maïwenn as Emma
- Rachid Bouchareb as Salah
- Meriem Serbah as Samia
- Abel Jafri as Adil
- Nina Zem as Nesrine
- Carl Malapa as Amir

== Reception ==
On Rotten Tomatoes, the film has an approval rating of 60% based on 5 reviews.
