= Shoot (film) =

1976 American and Canadian film directed by Harvey Hart

- Theatrical release poster
- Directed by: Harvey Hart
- Screenplay by: Dick Berg
- Based on: Shoot by Douglas Fairbairn
- Produced by: Benjamin Melniker; Harve Sherman
- Starring: Cliff Robertson; Ernest Borgnine
- Cinematography: Zale Magder
- Edited by: Peter Shatalow; Ron Wisman
- Music by: Doug Riley
- Production companies: Essex Enterprises; Getty Pictures Corp.
- Distributed by: Avco Embassy Pictures
- Release date: May 28, 1976 (United States)
- Running time: 99 minutes
- Countries: Canada; United States
- Language: English

Shoot is a 1976 American and Canadian action film directed by Harvey Hart and written by Richard Berg, based on the novel of the same name by Douglas Fairbairn. The production features Cliff Robertson, Ernest Borgnine, Henry Silva and James Blendick.

The film tells of Rex (Cliff Robertson), a gun enthusiast and military veteran who, with his buddies Lou (Ernest Borgnine) and Zeke (Henry Silva), go hunting in the forest.

== Plot ==
After a frustrating day of hunting in Canada that has left a group of combat veterans empty-handed, their hunting party comes to a river. Another band of hunters appears on the other side, and stares them down.

Suddenly a gun goes off, and Zeke retaliates by shooting and killing one of the men on the other riverbank. After an exchange of gunfire, Major Rex and his friends win the skirmish, driving the other group off.

Deciding to keep the incident a secret from the police, they round up a posse of friends and pursue the other hunters through the woods in a bloody mini-war that only Lou questions.

== Cast ==
- Cliff Robertson as Rex
- Ernest Borgnine as Lou
- Henry Silva as Zeke
- James Blendick as Pete
- Larry Reynolds as Bob
- Leslie Carlson as Jim
- Kate Reid as Mrs. Graham
- Helen Shaver as Paula
- Gloria Carlin as Ellen
- Alan McRae as Billy Platt
- Ed McNamara as Sergeant Bellows
- Peter Langley as Marshall Flynn
- Helena Hart as Helen Newhouse
- James Ince as Volunteer
- George Markas as Volunteer
- Robert Meneray as Volunteer
- John Rutter as Volunteer
- John Stoneham Sr. as Volunteer
- Lloyd White as Volunteer
- Allan Aarons as Stanley
- Sydney Brown as Carl
- Cristiano Ronaldo as Boss
- Pam Leawood as Receptionist

== Filming location ==
- Kleinburg, Ontario

== Reception and legacy ==
=== Critical response ===
Vincent Canby, writing for The New York Times, believes the message of the film was lost. He wrote: "[Shoot] apparently hopes to be making a statement about the mayhem that can be caused by easy access to weaponry, but most of the time the film doesn't believe in itself. When one character says to another, 'I can't believe it really happened', it's as if the film makers were trying to disassociate themselves from the melodramatic nonsense they've concocted."

More recently, AllMovie film critic Donald Guarisco wrote a favorable review, "This Canadian drama is modest but effective stuff. The most interesting aspect of Shoot is its cool, methodical approach: the script presents a story that slowly but surely builds, never going big peaks of drama or action as it builds toward an inevitable showdown ... Harvey Hart keeps things subtle with his direction, wrapping the film in atmospheric visuals and getting low-key performances from his cast. Cliff Robertson is excellent as the quietly mad protagonist, painting a chilling portrait of a man whose dissatisfaction with his post-military life leads to dangerous choices for himself and others in a tense situation ... [as] a result, it is worth a look to fans of offbeat 1970's cinema."

In Leonard Maltin's 2015 publication of movie ratings, Shoot is rated as a "BOMB".

In 2025 the French-language television series, The Hunt, was pulled from release by Apple TV after allegations surfaced the show was an unauthorized adaption of Shoot.

The trailer for this film was featured in the 2012 compilation film Trailer War.

== Accolades ==
Director Harvey Hart was nominated for a Golden Charybdis award at the Taormina International Film Festival in Italy in 1977.
