= Lye (disambiguation) =

Lye is a caustic chemical, usually referring to sodium hydroxide.

Lye or LYE may also refer to:

== Places ==
- Lye, West Midlands, a town in England
- Lye, Indre, a commune of the Indre département in France
- Lye railway station, England, whose National Rail station code is LYE
- RAF Lyneham, a former Royal Air Force station in Wiltshire, England whose IATA code is LYE

== People ==
- Edward Lye (1694–1767), English scholar
- Len Lye (1901–1980), New Zealand-born artist
- James Lye, Singaporean actor
- Kåre Arnstein Lye (1940–2021), Norwegian botanist

== See also ==
- Lje
