= Paris Pigalle =

- Directed by: Cédric Anger
- Written by: Cédric Anger
- Produced by: Curiosa Films; Sunrise Films; Mars Films; UMedia
- Starring: Guillaume Canet; Gilles Lellouche
- Music by: Grégoire Hetzel
- Release date: 2018
- Running time: 119 minutes
- Country: France
- Language: French
- Budget: $7.6 million
- Box office: $862.888

Paris Pigalle (French: L'amour est une fête) is a 2018 French comedy film directed by Cédric Anger. The film stars Guillaume Canet and Gilles Lellouche.

== Plot ==
Franck and Serge are the bosses of a peep show called Le Mirodrome. Burdened with debt, they decide to produce small pornographic films with their dancers. Their rapid success attracted the envy of their competitors. This is the beginning of an adventure in the pornographic cinema of the early 1980s.

== Cast ==
- Guillaume Canet as Frank / Martin
- Gilles Lellouche as Serge / Georges
- Michel Fau as Maurice Vogel
- Camille Razat as Virginie "Caprice"
- Xavier Beauvois as Henri Pachard
- Antonythasan Jesuthasan as Hakim
- Joséphine de La Baume as Linda
- Quentin Dolmaire as Vincent
- Louis-Do de Lencquesaing as the mansion owner
- Christian Mazzuchini as Bruno
