= The Great Game (2015 film) =

- Film poster
- French: Le Grand Jeu
- Directed by: Nicolas Pariser
- Written by: Nicolas Pariser
- Produced by: Emmanuel Agneray
- Starring: Melvil Poupaud; André Dussollier; Clémence Poésy
- Cinematography: Sébastien Buchmann
- Edited by: Léa Masson
- Music by: Benoît de Villeneuve; Benjamin Morando
- Production companies: Bizibi; BAC Films; Arte France Cinéma
- Distributed by: BAC Films
- Release dates: 9 August 2015 (Locarno); 16 December 2015 (France)
- Running time: 100 minutes
- Country: France
- Language: French
- Budget: $2.5 million
- Box office: $790.000

The Great Game (French: Le Grand Jeu) is a 2015 French political thriller drama film written and directed by Nicolas Pariser. The film stars Melvil Poupaud, André Dussollier and Clémence Poésy. The film premiered at the Locarno International Film Festival in August 2015. It won the Prix Louis-Delluc for Best First Film in December 2015.

== Plot ==
[This text was obtained by robotically translating text from the French Wikipedia version of this article. Please help to improve it.]

Pierre Blum (Melvil Poupaud), in his forties, is a writer who had his moment of glory but hasn't written for years. At a wedding, he meets an enigmatic figure, Joseph Paskin (André Dussolier). Influential in the political world, this charismatic man soon after offers him a strange deal: to anonymously write a book calling for insurrection in order to force the resignation of a troublesome minister. But when the pamphlet is published, the people surrounding Joseph are threatened one by one, and he disappears. Pierre is also attacked and forced to take refuge in the provinces on a farm where far-left activists live. There, he meets old acquaintances...

== Cast ==
- Melvil Poupaud as Pierre Blum
- André Dussollier as Joseph Paskin
- Clémence Poésy as Laura Haydon
- Sophie Cattani as Caroline
- Antoine Chappey as Copeau
- Nathalie Richard as Pauline
- Thomas Chabrol as Senator Darcy
- Natasha Andrews as Alice
- Vincent Deniard as Thomas
- Vanessa Larré as Juliette
- François Orsoni as Louis
- François Marthouret as Gérard
- Lou Chauvain as Lorca
- Bernard Verley as The General
- Audrey Bastien as The girl in the bookstore
