= The Lie (1992 film) =

Poster

Mensonge (The Lie) is a 1992 French drama film directed by François Margolin starring Nathalie Baye as a woman who finds she has been infected by her husband with AIDS. He has been unable to tell her torn between the desire for her and his son and fears of her likely homophobic reaction. She eventually confronts him and explains that she is HIV positive and she has chosen to abort the pregnancy. The films ends with them reconciled and seeking to support each other.
