= The Voice of Charlie Pont =

- Alcoa Premiere episode
- Bradford Dillman and Diana Hyland in "The Voice of Charlie Pont"
- Episode no.: Season 2 Episode 4
- Directed by: Robert Ellis Miller
- Written by: Halstead Welles (adaptation), Douglas Fairbairn (story)
- Original air date: October 25, 1962

Guest appearances
- Bradford Dillman as Charlie Pont; Diana Hyland as Liza Laurents; Robert Redford as George Laurents

Episode chronology
| ← Previous "The Long Walk Home" | Next → "Mr. Lucifer" |

"The Voice of Charlie Pont" was an American television movie broadcast by the American Broadcasting Company on October 25, 1962, as part of the television series, Alcoa Premiere. The screen play was written by Halstead Welles and directed by Robert Ellis Miller, with the original story having been written by author Douglas Fairbairn. The production received multiple Emmy Award nominations, including Program of the Year, Bradford Dillman for lead actor, Diana Hyland for lead actress, and Robert Redford for supporting actor.

== Plot ==
Charlie Pont (played by Bradford Dillman) returns to Cambridge to visit college friends George Laurents (played by Robert Redford) and Liza Laurents (played by Diana Hyland).

== Cast ==
The cast included performances by:

- Bradford Dillman as Charlie Pont
- Diana Hyland as Liza Laurents
- Robert Redford as George Laurents
- Bill Bixby as Brune
- Bob Hopkins as Truck Driver
- Cathie Merchant as Sheila
- Joey Russo as The Shine Boy
- Tammy Locke as Sally
- Ellen Madison as Susanna

The program was hosted by Fred Astaire.

== Production ==
The production was broadcast by the American Broadcasting Company on October 25, 1962, as part of the television series, Alcoa Premiere. It was written by Halstead Welles based on a story by Douglas Fairbairn. Robert Ellis Miller was the director and Dick Berg the producer. John Williams composed the music.

The production received multiple Emmy Award nominations, including Program of the Year, Bradford Dillman for lead actor, Diana Hyland for lead actress, Robert Redford for supporting actor, Robert Ellis Miller for outstanding directorial achievement, and Halstead Welles for outstanding writing achievement.
