= Douglas Fairbairn =

American novelist

- Born: Douglas Behl; December 20, 1926; Elmira, New York
- Died: October 2, 1997 (aged 70); Miami, Florida
- Education: Harvard College
- Occupation: Author

Douglas Behl Fairbairn (December 20, 1926 – October 2, 1997) was an American author who mainly wrote about South Florida. He wrote novels and a memoir.

== Early life ==
Born Douglas Behl in Elmira, New York, to Jean Melissa "Missy" (née Fairbairn) and Martin E. Behl. His father was born in Westphalen, Germany, and came to America as a toddler. His mother was born in Huntsville, Ontario, Canada. After marrying in Cleveland, Ohio, in 1918, his parents relocated frequently, living in Pennsylvania, New York, and New Jersey. His parents got a divorce when he was a child and he never saw his father again. (His father moved back to New York City and later died in Santa Barbara, California, in 1967.) His mother later remarried, to Wesley Hibbard Bunce, and they moved to Coconut Grove, Florida in 1938. After going by Douglas Bunce for a time, although not officially, he legally changed his last name to his mother's maiden name in 1955.

He attended but did not graduate from Harvard College, where he concentrated (majored) in English and was elected editor of the Harvard Lampoon despite having been expelled at the time. His Harvard roommate was the famous American actor Fred Gwynne. He returned to the Miami area where he would live out the rest of his life. He was married to wife Gay Fairbairn.

== Publications ==
=== Novels ===
- A Man's World (1956)
- The Joy Train (1957)
- Money, Marbles, and Chalk (1958)
- The Voice of Charlie Pont (1961, published by Random House in the compilation "Three Short Novels")
- A Gazelle on the Lawn (1964)
- Shoot (1973)
- Street 8 (1976)

=== Non-Fiction ===
- A Squirrel of One's Own (1971)
- A Squirrel Forever (1975)

=== Memoirs ===
- Down and Out in Cambridge (1982)

== Filmography ==
His screen credits include the television episode "A Man's World" (based on his novel of the same title) for Studio One in Hollywood, the episode "The Voice of Charlie Pont" on Alcoa Premiere (1962), and a 1976 feature film ("Shoot") adapted from his 1973 novel of the same name. In November 2025, Shoot made headlines when the Apple TV television show The Hunt was pulled just weeks before its debut after allegations were made that the production plagiarized key elements from Fairbairn's novel. A French production starring Benoît Magimel and Mélanie Laurent, the plot of The Hunt bears significant similarities to Shoot, which was both translated into French as La Traque and saw the 1976 movie starring Cliff Robertson and Ernest Borgnine dubbed and released in France as well. After an investigation into the allegations of plagiarism, the series premiered on Apple TV in March 2026 with a label on each episode identifying it as having been adapted from Fairbairn's novel and also credits the 1976 film adaptation.
