= Roschdy Zem =

French Moroccan actor and film director

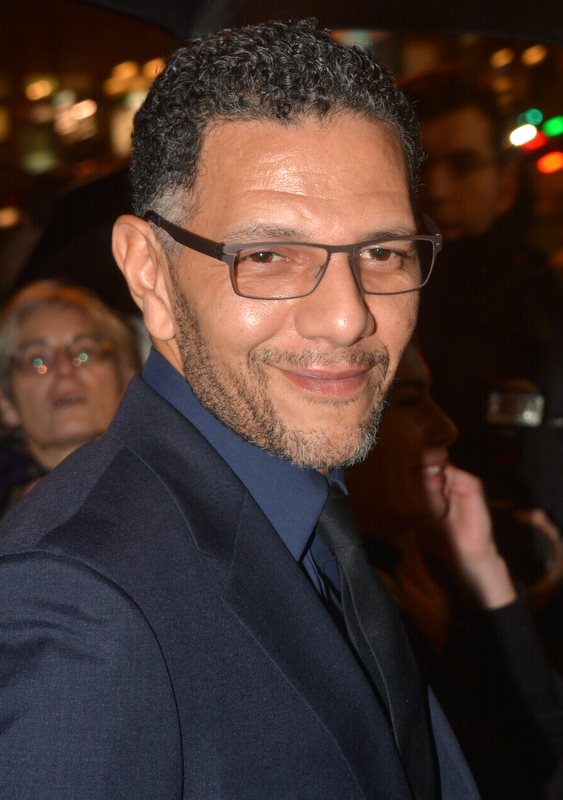
- Zem in 2017
- Born: 27 September 1965 (age 60); Gennevilliers, Hauts-de-Seine, France
- Occupation(s): Actor, film director, screenwriter, producer

Roschdy Zem (born 27 September 1965) is a French actor and filmmaker of Moroccan descent. He shared the award for Best Actor for his role in the film Days of Glory at the 2006 Cannes Film Festival.

== Career ==
Versatile and determined to not be typecast in "Beur" roles, Roschdy Zem developed his range, playing a general under Napoléon in Monsieur N. (2003), a Jewish father in Va, vis et deviens (Live and Become, 2005), and a transvestite in Change moi ma vie (Change My Life, 2001) alongside Fanny Ardant. He also appeared in roles highlighting issues in mainstream French society as well as in films promoting aspects of French and North African history such as Indigènes (Days of Glory, 2006) and Camping à la ferme (2005), based on a script from Azouz Begag.

In 2011, he directed the film Omar Killed Me, which was selected as the Moroccan entry for the Best Foreign Language Film at the 84th Academy Awards.

== Selected filmography ==
=== As actor ===
- 1987: Les keufs
- 1991: I Don't Kiss
- 1993: My Favorite Season
- 1995: Don't Forget You're Going to Die
- 1995: To Have (or Not)
- 1996: The Best Job in the World
- 1997: L'autre côté de la mer
- 1998: Those Who Love Me Can Take the Train
- 1998: Alice et Martin
- 1998: For Sale
- 1998: Louise (Take 2)
- 1999: The City
- 2000: Stand-by
- 2001: Change moi ma vie
- 2001: My Wife Is an Actress
- 2002: The Race
- 2003: Merci Docteur Rey
- 2003: Sansa
- 2004: 36
- 2005: Va, Vis et Deviens
- 2005: Camping à la ferme
- 2005: Le Petit Lieutenant
- 2006: Indigènes
- 2006: La Californie
- 2006: Mauvaise foi (also written and directed)
- 2007: Game of Four
- 2008: La fille de Monaco
- 2008: Go Fast
- 2008: La très très grande entreprise
- 2009: Commis d'office
- 2009: London River
- 2010: Outside the Law
- 2010: Point Blank
- 2010: Turk's Head
- 2010: Happy Few
- 2012: The Cold Light of Day, by Mabrouk El Mechri, as Zahir
- 2012: Une nuit, by Philippe Lefebvre, as Simon Weiss
- 2012: Mains armées, by Pierre Jolivet, as Lucas Scali
- 2012: Just like a Woman, by Rachid Bouchareb
- 2012: Collision, by David Marconi
- 2014: Bird People, by Pascale Ferran, as Simon
- 2014: La Rançon de la gloire
- 2014: On a failli être amies
- 2015: Alaska
- 2017: Les hommes du feu by Pierre Jolivet
- 2017: The Price of Success
- 2018: Nothing to Hide
- 2019: Oh Mercy!
- 2019: The Girl with a Bracelet
- 2019: Savages (Les Sauvages) – TV series
- 2021: Madame Claude
- 2022: The Innocent
- 2022: Other People's Children (Les enfants des autres)
- 2022: Our Ties
- 2023: The Edge of the Blade
- 2024: Winter in Sokcho (Hiver à Sokcho)
- 2024: Dear Paris (Paradis Paris)

=== As filmmaker ===
Year	Title	Credited as		Notes
Year	Title	Director	Screenwriter	Notes
2006	Bad Faith	Yes	Yes	Also actor
2011	Omar Killed Me	Yes	Yes	Also co-producer
2014	Bodybuilder	Yes	Yes	Also actor and producer
2016	Chocolat	Yes	Yes	
2019	Persona non grata	Yes	Yes	Also actor. Remake of O Invasor (2001)
2022	Our Ties	Yes	Yes	Also actor

== Awards and nominations ==
Year	Nominated work	Award	Result
2008	My Little Business	César Award for Best Supporting Actor	Nominated
2006	The Young Lieutenant	César Award for Best Supporting Actor	Nominated
2006	Days of Glory	Cannes Film Festival - Best Actor	Won
2007	Bad Faith	César Award for Best First Feature Film	Nominated
2007	Bad Faith	Globes de Cristal Award for Best Actor	Nominated
2009	The Girl from Monaco	César Award for Best Supporting Actor	Nominated
2009	The Girl from Monaco	Globes de Cristal Award for Best Actor	Nominated
2012	Omar Killed Me	César Award for Best Adaptation	Nominated
2017	Chocolat	Globe de Cristal for Best Film	Won
2019	Aux Animaux la guerre	ACS Award for Best Actor	Nominated
2020	Savages	ACS Award for Best Actor	Nominated
