= Xavier Beauvois =

French actor

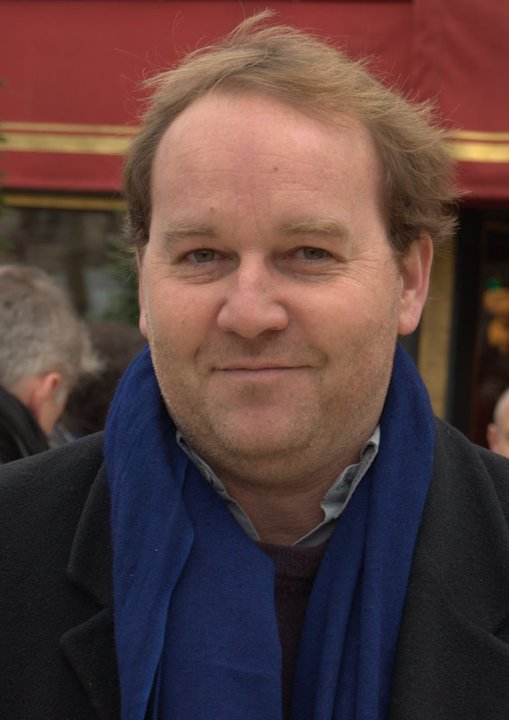
- Beauvois in February 2011
- Born: 20 March 1967 (age 59); Auchel, France
- Occupations: Actor, film director, screenwriter
- Years active: 1988–present

Xavier Beauvois (French: [ɡzavje bovwa]; born 20 March 1967) is a French actor, film director and screenwriter.

== Career ==
His film Don't Forget You're Going to Die was entered into the 1995 Cannes Film Festival where it won the Jury Prize.

His film Of Gods and Men received the Grand Prix and the Prize of the Ecumenical Jury at the 2010 Cannes Film Festival. The film was also selected as France's submission for the Academy Award for Best Foreign Language Film at the 83rd Academy Awards, but it did not make the final shortlist.

His 2014 film La Rançon de la gloire was selected to compete for the Golden Lion at the 71st Venice International Film Festival.

== Personal life ==
He is married to film editor Marie-Julie Maille. They have two sons, Arthur, who was born in August 1992, and Antoine, born May 1996.

== Filmography ==
=== Filmmaking credits ===
Year	Title	Credited as		Notes
Year	Title	Director	Screenwriter	Notes
1986	Le Matou	Yes	Yes	Short film
1991	North (Nord)	Yes	Yes	Montreal World Film Festival - Jury Prize; Montreal World Film Festival - First Film Prize; Montreal World Film Festival - FIPRESCI Prize; Nominated—César Award for Best First Feature Film; Nominated—César Award for Most Promising Actor; Nominated—European Film Award for Best Film; Nominated—European Film Award for European Discovery of the Year
1995	Don't Forget You're Going to Die	Yes	Yes	Cannes Film Festival - Jury Prize; Gijón International Film Festival - Special Jury Award; Prix Jean Vigo
1999	Night Wind		Yes	
2000	To Matthieu	Yes	Yes	Nominated—Venice Film Festival - Golden Lion
2000	João Mata Sete	Yes	Yes	
2005	The Young Lieutenant	Yes	Yes	Venice Film Festival - Europa Cinemas Label; Nominated—César Award for Best Film; Nominated—César Award for Best Director; Nominated—César Award for Best Original Screenplay; Nominated—Globes de Cristal Award for Best Film
2009	Notre ami Chopin	Yes	Yes	Short film
2010	Of Gods and Men	Yes	Yes	Cannes Film Festival - Grand Prix; Cannes Film Festival - Prize of the Ecumenical Jury; César Award for Best Film; Christopher Award for Feature Film; Cinema Mundi International Film Festival - Best Film; French Syndicate of Cinema Critics - Best French Film; London Film Critics' Circle Award for Foreign Language Film of the Year; Lumière Award for Best Film; National Board of Review Award for Best Foreign Language Film; Palm Springs International Film Festival - FIPRESCI Prize; Silver Condor Award for Best Foreign Film; Nominated—Amanda Award for Best Foreign Feature Film; Nominated—BAFTA Award for Best Film Not in the English Language; Nominated—Bodil Award for Best Non-American Film; Nominated—César Award for Best Director; Nominated—César Award for Best Original Screenplay; Nominated—European Film Award for Best Film; Nominated—Globes de Cristal Award for Best Film; Nominated—Lumière Award for Best Director; Nominated—Nastro d'Argento for Best European Director; Nominated—Robert Award for Best Non-American Film; Nominated—Toronto Film Critics Association Award for Best Foreign Language Film
2014	The Price of Fame	Yes	Yes	Nominated—Venice Film Festival - Golden Lion
2017	Les Gardiennes	Yes	Yes	
2021	Drift Away	Yes	Yes	
2024	Sailing Home	Yes	Yes	

=== Acting credits ===
Year	Title	Roles	Notes
1988	Daniel endormi	Le jeune dragueur	Short film
1991	North (Nord)	Bertrand	
1991	The Sky Above Paris	Le Soupirant	
1994	Aux petits bonheurs	Marc	
1994	Lovers	Marc's lover	
1995	Don't Forget You're Going to Die	Benoît	
1996	Ponette	Father	
1997	Day and Night	Carlo	
1998	Disparus	Félix	
1999	Night Wind	Paul	
1999	Les Infortunes de la beauté	Un homme sondé	Uncredited
2004	Arsène Lupin	Doctor	
2005	The Young Lieutenant	Nicolas Morbé	
2006	Bad Faith	Le type du bar	Uncredited
2007	The Witnesses	L'éditeur	
2007	24 Bars	Le patron du peep-show	
2007	The Killer	Franzen	
2008	Female Agents	Claude Granville	
2008	Disco	Docker 1	
2008	Marie-Octobre	Marc Donizzi	Telefilm
2009	Duel en ville	Alexandre Konygnski	Telefilm
2009	Villa Amalia	Thomas	
2009	À bicyclette		Short film
2009	Deux		Short film
2010	The Chameleon	Gendarme	
2010	Rendez-vous avec un ange	L'homme bar chic	
2011	House of Tolerance	Jacques	
2011	Early One Morning	Alain Fisher	
2012	Farewell, My Queen	Louis XVI	
2012	Au galop	François	
2012	Quand je serai petit	Stéphane	
2013	Turf	Commissaire Dubiton	
2013	A Castle in Italy	Serge	
2013	Love Is the Perfect Crime	Petit rôle	
2014	Bodybuilder	Le comptable	
2014	The Price of Fame	Monsieur Loyal	
2016	Chocolat	Jacques Potin	
2016	The End	Hiker	
2016	Arctic Heart	Jury President	
2017	Django	Médecin STO	
2017	Let the Sunshine In	Vincent Briot	
2017	Maryline	Michel Roche	
2018	The Summer House	Producer	
2018	Paris Pigalle	Henri Pachard	
2019	Captain Sharif	Michel Rouxel	Episode: "Le chat connaît l'assassin"
2020	Call My Agent!	Himself	Episode: "Charlotte"
2021	Drift Away	Jacques	
2023	Making Of	Marquez	
2023–2024	De Grâce	Sébastien Prevost	Miniseries
