= Jean-Marie Rouart =

French novelist, essayist and journalist

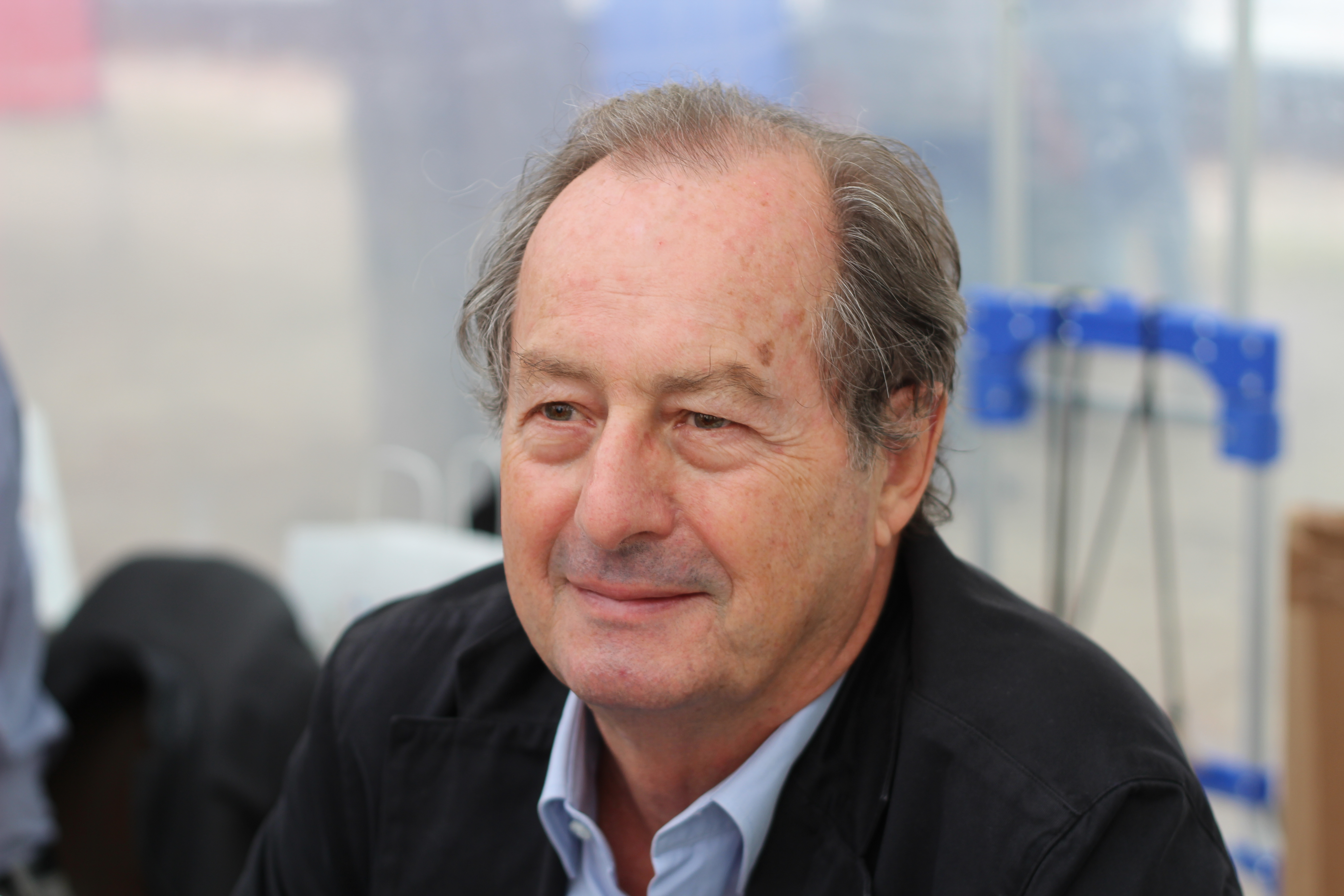
- Jean-Marie Rouart (2014)
- Born: 8 April 1943 (age 83); Neuilly-sur-Seine, France
- Occupations: Journalist, writer
- Known for: Member of the Académie française

Jean-Marie Rouart (born 8 April 1943 in Neuilly-sur-Seine) is a French novelist, essayist and journalist. He was elected to the Académie française on 18 December 1997.

== Bibliography ==
- 1974 : La Fuite en Pologne (Grasset)
- 1975 : La Blessure de Georges Aslo (Grasset)
- 1977 : Les Feux du pouvoir - Prix Interallié (Grasset)
- 1980 : Le Mythomane (Grasset)
- 1983 : Avant-guerre - Prix Renaudot (Grasset )
- 1985 : Ils ont choisi la nuit - Prix de l'Essai de l'Académie française (Grasset )
- 1987 : Le Cavalier blessé (Grasset )
- 1989 : La Femme de proie (Grasset)
- 1990 : Le Voleur de jeunesse (Grasset)
- 1993 : Le Goût du malheur (Gallimard)
- 1994 : Omar, la construction d’un coupable (Le Fallois)
- 1995 : Morny, un voluptueux au pouvoir (Gallimard)
- 1997 : L’Invention de l’amour (Grasset)
- 1998 : La Noblesse des vaincus (Grasset)
- 1998 : Bernis, le cardinal des plaisirs (Gallimard)
- 2000 : Une jeunesse à l’ombre de la lumière (Gallimard)
- 2000 : Discours de réception à l'Académie française (Grasset)
- 2001 : Une famille dans l'impressionisme (Gallimard)
- 2002 : Nous ne savons pas aimer (Gallimard)
- 2003 : Adieu à la France qui s'en va (Grasset)
- 2004 : Libertin et chrétien (Desclée de Brouwer)
- 2005 : Mes fauves (Grasset)
- 2006 : Le Scandale (Gallimard)
- 2008 : Devoir d'insolence, Grasset
- 2009 : Cette opposition qui s'appelle la vie, Grasset
