= Next Time I'll Aim for the Heart =

- Film poster
- Directed by: Cédric Anger
- Screenplay by: Cédric Anger
- Based on: Un assassin au-dessus de tout soupçon by Yvan Stefanovitch
- Produced by: Alain Attal; Thomas Klotz
- Starring: Guillaume Canet; Ana Girardot; Jean-Yves Berteloot; Patrick Azam; Arnaud Henriet; Douglas Attal; Pierick Tournier; Alexandre Carrière; François-Dominique Blin; Franck Andrieux; Alice de Lencquesaing
- Cinematography: Thomas Hardmeier
- Edited by: Julien Leloup
- Music by: Grégoire Hetzel
- Production companies: Sunrise Film; Les Productions du Trésor; Mars Films; Caneo Films
- Distributed by: Mars Distribution
- Release dates: 23 August 2014 (Angoulême); 12 November 2014 (France)
- Running time: 111 minutes
- Country: France
- Language: French
- Budget: €4 million
- Box office: $3.4 million

Next Time I'll Aim for the Heart (French: La Prochaine fois je viserai le cœur) is a 2014 French thriller film written and directed by Cédric Anger. It was adapted from the novel Un assassin au-dessus de tout soupçon by Yvan Stefanovitch. Set in 1970s Oise, France, it is based on the story of Alain Lamare, a gendarme who was later revealed to be a murderer (serial killer in the film).

== Cast ==
- Guillaume Canet as Franck
- Jean-Paul Comart as Franck's father
- Hélène Vauquois as Franck's mother
- Ana Girardot as Sophie
- Jean-Yves Berteloot as Lacombe
- Patrick Azam as Tonton
- Cédric Le Maoût as Olivier
- Alice de Lencquesaing as Melissa
- Nicolas Ronchi as the doctor
- Nicolas Carpentier as Paul
- Alexandre Carrière as Ossart
- Franck Andrieux as Auzier
- Arthur Dujardin as Bruno
- Pierick Tournier as Carpentier
- Laura Giudice as Roxane

== Accolades ==
In January 2015, the film received two nominations at the 20th Lumière Awards. The film also received two César Award nominations at the 40th César Awards.
