= Jowan Le Besco =

French actor (born 1981)

- Born: 26 August 1981 (age 44); Paris, France
- Occupations: film director and cinematographer
- Mother: Catherine Belkhodja
- Family: Maïwenn Le Besco (sister); Isild Le Besco (sister); Kolia Litscher (brother); Shanna Besson (niece)

Jowan Le Besco is a director, cinematographer, screenwriter, editor and actor.

== Family ==
Le Besco was born to a Franco-Algerian mother, the actress Catherine Belkhodja, and Patrick Le Besco, a linguist specializing in the Breton language. His maternal grandfather, Abdelkader Belkhodja, a former FLN moudjahid based in France, was then in charge of emigration at the Ministry of Labor from 1965 to 1972, then at the Ministry of Former Moudjahidines until 1975 (Algeri); his grandmother, Jeanne Mauborgne, a nurse and then a social worker, was, like her husband, a very active communist activist. He is the brother of two directors and actresses, Maïwenn and Isild Le Besco; he also has a third sister, Leonor Graser, and a brother, Kolia Litscher.

== Career ==
Le Besco shoots his first professional film as director of photography, with Demi-tarif released in 2004 and directed by his younger sister Isild Le Besco. The film won many awards in France and internationally and allowed them to produce the next film of Isild Le Besco: Charly (2006). He then worked with directors and cinematographers such as Caroline Champetier, Romain Winding, Claire Mathon, Benoît Jacquot and Emmanuelle Bercot. At the same time as shooting, he followed training courses at the École nationale supérieure Institut Louis Lumière and the École de l'Image Les Gobelins. In 2006, he wrote and directed his first feature film, Yapo (documentary filmed in India, in the Sikkim region) which earned it a selection at the 29th edition of the Cinéma du Réel Festival. A shorter version of the film was broadcast in 2008 on the television channel Arte, in the documentary slot La Lucarne, under the title Les béquilles du Lama Yapo.

Le Besco has worked as a director of photography and cameraman for films such as Polisse, Mon roi, Connemara, Lomepal: 3 jours à Motorbass, Les Deux Amis, The Untouchable, Bas-fonds, La Belle Occasion, and Confinés. He also works regularly in the field of music and performing arts, notably as a director and cinematographer, with collaborators including the Opéra National de Paris, Pédro Kouyaté, the Orchestre national de Barbès, Tartit, Bania, Farees, Ghassen Fendri, and Senny Camara.

== Filmography ==
=== Cinematographer ===
==== Feature films ====
- 2004: Demi-tarif by Isild Le Besco
- 2007: Charly by Isild Le Besco
- 2007: Childhoods coproduced by Safy Nebbou, Isild Le Besco, Joana Hadjithomas and Khalil Joreige, Corinne Garfin, Ismaël Ferroukhi and Yann Le Gal
- 2008: Bas-Fonds by Isild Le Besco
- 2013: Manhattan Romance by Haik Kocharian
- 2014: Little boy (short), in the choral film Bridges of Sarajevo
- 2017: La Belle Occasion by Isild Le Besco
- 2020: Confinés by Isild Le Besco
- 2021: Connemara by Isild Le Besco

=== Cameraman ===
==== Feature films ====
- 2006: L'Intouchable by Benoît Jacquot
- 2006: Gaspard le Bandit by Benoît Jacquot
- 2010: Polisse by Maïwenn
- 2015: Mon roi by Maïwenn
- 2015: Les Deux Amis by Louis Garrel
- 2019: Lomepal – 3 jours à Motobass by Christophe Charrier

=== Writer, director, cinematographer, editor ===
==== Documentary ====
- 2007 : Yapo (présenté au Festival Cinéma du Réel), by Jowan Le Besco
- 2008 : Les béquilles du Lama Yapo (Arte-La Lucarne), by Jowan Le Besco
- 2011: On va à Cannes !!! (Le Making of de Polisse) by Jowan Le Besco and Douglas Attal

==== Fiction ====
- 2002: Narada

=== Actor ===
==== Cinema ====
- 1999: La Puce by Emmanuelle Bercot
- 2002: A Moment of Happiness by Antoine Santana with Isild Le Besco
- 2011: I am Kalam by Nila Nadhab Panda

==== Television ====
- 1989: The Owl's Legacy by Chris Marker
- 2004 : Princesse Marie by Benoît Jacquot, Pierre de Grèce

=== Other ===
==== Feature films ====
- 2002: Mods by Serge Bozon (1st assistant director)
- 2004: À tout de suite by Benoît Jacquot (Making of)
- 2006: L'Intouchable by Benoît Jacquot (1st assistant director)

==== Short films ====
- 2009: Some kinda fuckery by Nadia Szold (Cinematographer)
- 2014: *Me There de Majaajyia Silberfeld (Cinematographer)
- 2019: 22 Min d'Isild Le Besco (Cinematographer)
- 2020: En mon cœur by Isild Le Besco (Cinematographer)
- 2020: Independence # D, Farees (Cinematographer)
- 2021: Foudroyer en bien by Isild Le Besco (Cinematographer)
- 2022: Le viol du pouvoir by Deborah De Robertis (Cinematographer)

== Theater ==
- 2004 : Le Pois chiche de et avec Maïwenn au Café de la Gare (captation)

== Awards and recognition ==
- 2000 : Junior prize for best screenplay at the Paris Film Festival for her first screenplay: Demi-tarif
- 2004 : Special Jury Prize at the European First Film festival of Angers for Demi-tarif
- 2004 : Procirep Prize Premiers plans. Angers for Demi-tarif
- 2004 : Special Jury Prize at the Seoul International Women's Film Festival for Demi-tarif
- 2004 : Nominated for the award Louis Deluc for Demi-tarif
- 2005 : Grand Prize of the Jury Crossing Europe Festival Linz for Demi-tarif
- 2007 : Selection at the Festival Cinéma du Réel pour Les Béquilles du Lama Yapo
