= Le Besco =

- Pronunciation: pronounced [lœ besko]

Origin
- Origin: Breton
- Meaning: little curtailed, little tailless
- Region of origin: Brittany

Other names
- Variant forms: Bescou, Bescq, Le Besque

Le Besco is a surname of Breton origin. It may refer to any the following people:

Besco derives from a Breton diminutive of besk which means curtailed or tailless.

- Isild Le Besco (born 1982), a French actress
- Jowan Le Besco (born 1981), a French actor, scriptwriter, director and chief cameraman
- Maïwenn Le Besco (born 1976), a French actress
