= Stage mother =

Mother of a child actor

In the performing arts, a stage mother is the mother of a child actor. The term stage mother sometimes has a negative connotation, suggesting that the individual is prone to obnoxiously demanding special treatment for her child, or suggesting that the individual has placed inappropriate pressure on her child to succeed, perhaps for reasons of vicariously living out her own dreams through the child. Entitled and grandiose demands have sometimes led to reportedly veiled threats from a stage parent.

== Definition ==
A stage mother may also be the official manager of her child (e.g., Ethel Gumm, Debra McCurdy, Tina Douglas, Rose Thompson Hovick, Dina Lohan, Teri Shields, Susan Duff, Lesley Vogel, Catherine Belkhodja, Tina Knowles, Katherine Jackson, etc.)—representing her child in negotiations for the professional services of her child. Such managers have often been referred to as "momagers" in the film industry.

In certain cases where a mother and child both work in the film industry, an automatic labeling of "stage mother" can be affixed to the mother without cause.

== Stage fathers ==
Fathers have also been known to manage their children in this way, such as Joe Jackson (patriarch of the Jackson family), Murry Wilson (father of three founding members of The Beach Boys), Joe Simpson (father of Jessica and Ashlee Simpson), Jeff Archuleta (father of American Idol runner-up David Archuleta), Mathew Knowles (father of Beyoncé and Solange Knowles), Ira David Wood III (father of Evan Rachel Wood) and Kit Culkin (father of Macaulay and Kieran Culkin). A historical example of such a father was Leopold Mozart, who recognized his son Wolfgang's musical ability at an early age.

Abraham Quintanilla Jr., father of Tejano superstar Selena, is credited with having discovered Selena's gift of singing and organizing her and her siblings as a band (Selena y Los Dinos).

Stage fathers share a similar role with parents promoting their children in professional sports. The drive to enhance their child's success, and vicariously the father's own financial furtherance and fame can include implementation of strength and exercise regimens at a young age and backhanded actions such as delaying enrollment in school so their sons will be bigger than their classmates. LaVar Ball, father of NBA player Lonzo Ball, achieved notoriety for spurious self aggrandizement and inflation of his son's assets, including questionable claims that his son's basketball skills exceeded those of Stephen Curry, LeBron James and Russell Westbrook.

== Script mother ==
A variant of the term has been a "script mother", or a woman writer who sees her children as a means for writing books or screenplays based on humiliating events in the child's life, to the detriment of the child, or exaggerating a child's personal problems. Script mothers can be writers, comedians or cartoonists (Comtesse de Ségur, Christine Angot, Maïwenn).

An example of a script mother has been Lynn Johnston, who has been criticized for exploiting her children (and husband) in her comic strip For Better or For Worse, as opposed to many cartoonists such as Charles Schultz and Berke Breathed who make up fictional characters. Johnston's children eventually had to be pulled out of school due to the constant bullying and embarrassment they received in being compared to their comic strip counterparts, and placed into a private school with tougher regulations on student conduct.

== In popular culture ==
Real-life stage mothers and their children have been a popular subject for reality television shows, including the shows I Know My Kid's a Star (2008), Dance Moms (2011–2019), Toddlers & Tiaras (2008–2016) and its spinoff Here Comes Honey Boo Boo (2012–2014).

== See also ==
- List of stage mothers
- Child actor
- Child beauty pageant
- Helicopter parent
- Karen (slang)
- Kyōiku mama
- Soccer mom
- Tennis dad
- Tiger mom
