= List of stage mothers =

This is a list of stage mothers. In the entertainment industry, a stage mother is the term for the mother of a child performer. Often the stage mother is the manager of the child's career and oversees their auditions, costuming and preparation for performances and negotiates financial remuneration on the child's behalf.

There is sometimes a negative connotation associated with the term, sometimes implying a mother who exerts unreasonable demands for the child's treatment, or puts undue pressure on the child, or who may take advantage of the child's income or notoriety for her own selfish purposes.

== Well-known stage mothers ==
- Catherine Belkhodja (mother of Maïwenn and Isild Le Besco)
- Carol Connors (mother of Thora Birch)
- Ruby Dandridge (mother of Dorothy and Vivian Dandridge)
- Thérèse Dion (mother of Céline Dion)
- Susan Duff (mother of Hilary and Haylie Duff)
- Iris Frederick (mother of Lynne Frederick)
- Joan Grande (mother of Ariana and Frankie Grande)
- Yolanda Hadid (mother of Gigi Hadid and Bella Hadid)
- Melissa Gisoni (mother of Maddie Ziegler and Mackenzie Ziegler)
- Ethel Gumm (mother of Judy Garland)
- Maria Gurdin (mother of Natalie and Lana Wood)
- Lynn Harless (mother of Justin Timberlake)
- Jean Poe Harlow Bello (mother of Jean Harlow)
- Diane Haughton (mother of Aaliyah)
- Charlotte Hennessey (mother of Mary, Jack and Lottie Pickford)
- Wanda Holloway (The Positively True Adventures of the Alleged Texas Cheerleader-Murdering Mom)
- Rose Hovick (mother of Gypsy Rose Lee and June Havoc)
- Katherine Jackson (mother of the Jackson family)
- Kris Jenner (mother of Kim Kardashian, Khloe Kardashian, Kourtney Kardashian, Kylie Jenner and Kendall Jenner)
- Ruth Landers (mother of Audrey Landers and Judy Landers)
- Tina Knowles (mother of Beyoncé and Solange Knowles)
- Nuala Quinn-Barton (mother of Mischa Barton)
- Diana Levesque (mother of JoJo)
- Dina Lohan (mother of Lindsay and Ali Lohan)
- Minnie Marx (mother of the Marx Brothers)
- Debra McCurdy (mother of Jennette McCurdy)
- Colette Momsen (mother of Taylor Momsen)
- Sonja Norwood (mother of Brandy and Ray J)
- Patsy Ramsey (mother of JonBenét Ramsey)
- Mama June Shannon (Here Comes Honey Boo Boo)
- Charlotte Shelby (mother of Mary Miles Minter)
- Teri Shields (mother of Brooke Shields)
- Agnes Doreen Sellers (mother of Peter Sellers)
- Lynne Spears (mother of Britney and Jamie Lynn Spears)
- Sara Taylor (mother of Elizabeth Taylor)
- Lesley R. Vogel (mother of Hayden Panettiere)
- Chrisoula Workman (mother of Ariel Winter, Shanelle Workman and Jimmy Workman)
