= Pascal Elso =

French actor

- Born: France
- Occupations: Actor, comedian, director
- Years active: 1983–present

Pascal Elso is a French actor and director.

== Career ==
Pascal Elso is an actor, comedian, director. He has taught acting at several cinema schools, and has also worked as a choreographer, clown, and mime artist.

== Filmography ==
=== Cinema ===
Year	Title	Role	Director	Notes
1985	L'Amour braque		Andrzej Żuławski	
1985	Charly		Florence Strauss	Short
1987	V.O.		Christophe Delmas	Short
1987	Sortie de bain		Jean-Pierre Ronssin	Short
1989	Life and Nothing But	The blind	Bertrand Tavernier	
1991	Simon courage		Patrick Ardis	Short
1994	Le voyageur immobile		Patrick Ardis	Short
1997	Alors voilà,	Henri	Michel Piccoli	
1998	Nous sommes tous des gagnants		Claude Dray	Short
1999	À mort la mort!	Fenec	Romain Goupil	
1999	L'homme de ma vie	Peter Scheller	Stéphane Kurc	
2000	Girls Can't Swim	Alain	Anne-Sophie Birot	
2002	La maîtresse en maillot de bain	The attendant	Lyèce Boukhitine	
2005	Journal IV		Mathieu Gérault	
2005	Tout pour plaire	Caligula	Cécile Telerman	
2006	Burnt Out	Marc	Fabienne Godet	
2006	Le Grand Meaulnes	Florentin	Jean-Daniel Verhaeghe	
2006	Les fragments d'Antonin	The Warrant	Gabriel Le Bomin	
2006	Ce que je vous dois	The son	Olivier Bouffard	Short
2007	Two Worlds	Serge Vitali	Daniel Cohen	
2008	Mesrine	Commissioner SRPJ	Jean-François Richet	
2008	Childhoods	Ingmar Bergman's father	Ismaël Ferroukhi	
2008	Mark of an Angel	The man in the bar	Safy Nebbou	
2008	Rive Glauque	Patrick	Steven Ada & Eric Poulet	Short
2010	Police matinale	The concierge	Pierre-Antoine Coutant	Short
2011	R.I.F.	Christian Baumann	Franck Mancuso	
2011	Café de Flore	Paul	Jean-Marc Vallée	
2011	Omar Killed Me	André de Comminges	Roschdy Zem	
2012	Les chancelants		Nadine Lermite	Short
2012	Coney Island Girl	Salines	Franck Richard	Short
2013	La fille publique	Director Antellon	Cheyenne Carron	
2014	Fièvres	Nounours	Hicham Ayouch	
2014	La liste de mes envies	Alain	Didier Le Pêcheur	
2014	L'enfer me ment	The doctor	Gérald Portenart	Short
2015	Home Suite Home	Waiter	Jeroen Houben	Short
2016	Vendeur	Daniel	Sylvain Desclous	
2016	The Innocents	The colonel	Anne Fontaine	
2016	Looking for Her	Roger	Ounie Lecomte	
2017	La Morsure des dieux	The financial advisor	Cheyenne Carron	
2017	Ride Sally Ride	The old man	Julien Hosmalin	Short
2018	Jeunesse aux coeurs ardents	The father	Cheyenne Carron	
2018	Rage	Hercule	Carla Caplin	Short
2019	La Théorie de l'Invisible	Isaac Opfer	Alexandre Delpech	Short
2020	Persian Lessons	French Policeman	Vadim Perelman	
2020	Pas totalement par hasard	Gas Station Attendant	Aurélien Thibault	Short
2021	Vaurien	The merchant	Peter Dourountzis	
2021	Entre les tombes	Charles	Romain & Thibault Lafargue	Short
2022	Maigret	Clermont-Valois's lawyer	Patrice Leconte	
2022	Les lendemains de veille	Didier	Loïc Paillard	
2022	Simone Veil, A Woman of the Century	Eugène Claudius-Petit	Olivier Dahan	
2022	Grand Expectations	Bertrand Mandeville	Sylvain Desclous	

=== Television ===
Year	Title	Role	Director	Notes
1985	Hôtel de police	Lebeau's friend	Claude Barrois	TV series (1 episode)
1988	Souris noire		Michel Favart	TV series (1 episode)
1989	Bouvard et Pecuchet	Teacher	Jean-Daniel Verhaeghe	TV movie
1989	L'or du diable	The young priest	Jean-Louis Fournier	TV mini-series
1989	Le masque	Volson	Sylvie Durepaire	TV series (1 episode)
1992	La controverse de Valladolid	Brother Emiliano	Jean-Daniel Verhaeghe	TV movie
1992	Papa veut pas que je t'épouse	Yéouda	Patrick Volson	TV movie
1993	Divisé par deux	Alain	James Thor	TV Short
1993	L'interdiction		Jean-Daniel Verhaeghe	TV movie
1993	J'aime pas qu'on m'aime	Lavaut	Stéphane Kurc	TV movie
1994	Eugénie Grandet	Cruchot de Bonfons	Jean-Daniel Verhaeghe	TV movie
1994	La règle de l'homme	Almeyda	Jean-Daniel Verhaeghe	TV movie
1994	Associations de bienfaiteurs	Young monk	Jean-Daniel Verhaeghe	TV mini-series
1994	L'instit	Julien's father	Michel Favart	TV series (1 episode)
1995	Un si bel orage	The doctor	Jean-Daniel Verhaeghe	TV movie
1995	La fête des pères	Tavernier	Jean-Daniel Verhaeghe	TV movie
1995	Parents à mi-temps	M. Elso	Alain Tasma	TV movie
1996	Petit	Prince Charming	Patrick Volson	TV movie
1996	Long cours	Delassale	Alain Tasma	TV movie
1996	Le voyage de Pénélope	The cop	Patrick Volson	TV movie
1996	Le parfum de Jeannette	The client	Jean-Daniel Verhaeghe	TV movie
1996	Les Steenfort, maîtres de l'orge	Noël Steenfort	Jean-Daniel Verhaeghe	TV mini-series
1996	Madame la proviseur	Monsieur Vignon	Bertrand Van Effenterre	TV series (1 episode)
1997	À chacun son tour	Philippe	Jean-Jacques Kahn	TV movie
1997	L'esprit des flots	Simon	David Delrieux	TV movie
1997	Des gens si bien élevés	Hugues	Alain Nahum	TV movie
1997	Hors limites	Vannier	Dennis Berry	TV series (1 episode)
1998	Bonnes vacances	Louis	Pierre Badel	TV movie
1998	Les brumes de Manchester	Regis Harcourt	Jean-Daniel Verhaeghe	TV movie
1998	Ça commence à bien faire!	Joe	Patrick Volson	TV movie
1998	L'enfant des terres blondes	Félix	Édouard Niermans	TV movie
1998	Une voix en or	Jean-Marie	Michelle Allen & Patrick Volson	TV mini-series
1998	La poursuite du vent	Charles	Nina Companeez	TV mini-series
1998	Au coeur de la loi	Jouffroy	Denis Malleval	TV series (1 episode)
1998	Dossier: disparus	Bernard Chailloux	Antoine Lorenzi	TV series (2 episodes)
1999	Brigade des mineurs	Mérot	Michaëla Watteaux	TV movie
1999	Le destin des Steenfort	Noël Steenfort	Jean-Daniel Verhaeghe	TV mini-series
1999	Mélissol	Lefèvre	Jean-Pierre Igoux	TV series (1 episode)
1999	Chambre n° 13		Lars Blumers	TV series (1 episode)
2000	Route de nuit	Professor Lalou	Laurent Dussaux	TV movie
2000	Vertiges	Pinson	Laurent Carcélès	TV series (1 episode)
2000	L'avocate	Carton	Alain Nahum	TV series (1 episode)
2000	B.R.I.G.A.D.	Marc Aubry	Marc Angelo	TV series (1 episode)
2000	Julie Lescaut	Tarquin	Stéphane Kurc	TV series (1 episode)
2000	Chercheur d'héritiers	Christian Peyre	Olivier Langlois	TV series (1 episode)
2000	Une femme d'honneur	Cordelier	David Delrieux	TV series (1 episode)
2001	Le maire		Patrick Volson	TV movie
2001	Madame De...	The doctor	Jean-Daniel Verhaeghe	TV movie
2001	Objectif bac	M. Fortini	Patrick Volson	TV movie
2001	Nestor Burma	The entrepreneur	David Delrieux	TV series (1 episode)
2001	Fred et son orchestre	Philippe Raynaud	Michaëla Watteaux	TV series (1 episode)
2002	Romance sans paroles	The doctor	Jean-Daniel Verhaeghe	TV movie
2002	Les rebelles de Moissac	Me Boissard	Jean-Jacques Kahn	TV movie
2002	Alice Nevers	Farelli	Pierre Boutron	TV series (1 episode)
2002	Louis la brocante	Adrien Rivière	Alain-Michel Blanc	TV series (1 episode)
2002	Avocats & associés	Brice Karel	Pascal Chaumeil	TV series (2 episodes)
2002–04	Le Camarguais	The monk	Patrick Volson, William Gotesman, ...	TV series (7 episodes)
2003	L'adieu	Maillard	François Luciani	TV movie
2003	Zéro défaut	Medi	Pierre Schoeller	TV movie
2003	Le dirlo: Lucie	Laplanche	Patrick Volson	TV movie
2003	La deuxième vérité	Bertrand Gassin	Philippe Monnier	TV movie
2003	Satan refuse du monde	François	Jacques Renard	TV movie
2003	Les Thibault	Simon de Battaincourt	Jean-Daniel Verhaeghe	TV mini-series
2003	Josephine, Guardian Angel	Michel	Stéphane Kurc	TV series (1 episode)
2003	Les Cordier, juge et flic	The Innkeeper	Michaël Perrotta	TV series (1 episode)
2003	Madame la proviseur	Chevalier	Alain Bonnot	TV series (5 episodes)
2004	Bien agités!	Bank employee	Patrick Chesnais	TV movie
2004	Haute coiffure	Gérard	Marc Rivière	TV movie
2004	L'abbaye du revoir	Father Abbé	Jérôme Anger	TV movie
2004	La Petite Fadette	Father Caillaud	Michaëla Watteaux	TV movie
2004	Nature contre nature	The hunter	Lucas Belvaux	TV movie
2004	Si c'est ça la famille	Vidal	Peter Kassovitz	TV movie
2004	L'homme qui venait d'ailleurs	The teacher	François Luciani	TV movie
2004	Je serai toujours près de toi	The judge	Claudio Tonetti	TV movie
2004	Louis Page	M. Darand	Jean-Daniel Verhaeghe	TV series (1 episode)
2004	Blandine, l'insoumise	Cyril Jacomet	Claude d'Anna	TV series (1 episode)
2005	1905	Abbé Courtois	Henri Helman	TV movie
2005	Le temps meurtrier	Hans Gascher	Philippe Monnier	TV movie
2005	Le triporteur de Belleville	Joseph	Stéphane Kurc	TV movie
2005	Galilée ou L'amour de Dieu	The Dominican	Jean-Daniel Verhaeghe	TV movie
2005	P.J.	Michel Dupré	Gérard Vergez	TV series (1 episode)
2005	S.O.S. 18	Claude	Dominique Baron	TV series (1 episode)
2005	Les enquêtes d'Éloïse Rome	Hugues Poitier	Christophe Douchand	TV series (1 episode)
2005–09	Vénus & Apollon	Hippolyte	Pascal Lahmani, Olivier Guignard, ...	TV series (16 episodes)
2006	Pour l'amour de Dieu	Léonard	Ahmed Bouchaala & Zakia Tahri	TV movie
2006	La volière aux enfants	The mayor	Olivier Guignard	TV movie
2006	Du goût et des couleurs	Marc Courtin	Michaëla Watteaux	TV movie
2006	Opération Rainbow Warrior	Daniel Soulez Larivière	Charlotte Brändström	TV movie
2006	Le temps de la désobéissance	Durieux	Patrick Volson	TV movie
2006	Le Cri	Léon Brulé	Hervé Baslé	TV mini-series
2006	Le Grand Charles	Gaston Palewski	Bernard Stora	TV mini-series
2006	Sœur Thérèse.com	Rosset	Christian François	TV series (1 episode)
2007	Le temps des secrets	Lois de Montmajour	Thierry Chabert	TV movie
2007	Moi, Louis, enfant de la mine	Caron	Thierry Binisti	TV movie
2007	Les camarades	Hubert	François Luciani	TV mini-series
2007	Le clan Pasquier	M. Wasselin	Jean-Daniel Verhaeghe	TV mini-series
2007	La lance de la destinée	Doctor Zuber	Dennis Berry	TV mini-series
2007	Greco	Louis Ferjeac	Philippe Setbon	TV series (1 episode)
2007	Les prédateurs	Olivier Metzner	Lucas Belvaux	TV series (1 episode)
2007	Le grand patron	Doctor Schneider	Christian Bonnet	TV series (1 episode)
2007	Chez Maupassant	Sapeur	Jacques Rouffio	TV series (1 episode)
2007	La commune	Georges 'GG' Gauthier	Philippe Triboit	TV series (7 episodes)
2008	Raboliot	Volat	Jean-Daniel Verhaeghe	TV movie
2008	Le septième juré	Commissioner Valard	Édouard Niermans	TV movie
2008	Une lumière dans la nuit	Georges Beaumont	Olivier Guignard	TV movie
2009	Cet été-là	Lucas	Élisabeth Rappeneau	TV movie
2009	La saison des immortelles	Touchot	Henri Helman	TV movie
2009	Comme un mauvais souvenir	Michel	André Chandelle	TV movie
2009	Histoires de vies	The neurologist	Thomas Bourguignon	TV series (1 episode)
2009	Les Petits Meurtres d'Agatha Christie	Léopold Vallabrègues	Stéphane Kappes	TV series (1 episode)
2009	Diane, femme flic	Mathias Werther	Manuel Boursinhac	TV series (2 episodes)
2009	Vive les vacances!	Captain Saulieu	Stéphane Kappes	TV series (6 episodes)
2009–11	Braquo	Attorney Vanderbeke	Olivier Marchal, Philippe Haïm, ...	TV series (8 episodes)
2010	Quand vient la peur...	Commissioner Garnier	Élisabeth Rappeneau	TV movie
2010	La femme qui pleure au chapeau rouge	Paul Éluard	Jean-Daniel Verhaeghe	TV movie
2010	La commanderie	Geoffroy de Montet	Didier Le Pêcheur	TV mini-series
2011	Longue peine	Nicolas Philipon	Christian Bonnet	TV movie
2011	Accident de parcours	Bornaire	Patrick Volson	TV movie
2012	Clémenceau	Paul Deschanel	Olivier Guignard	TV movie
2012	Chien de guerre	Papy	Fabrice Cazeneuve	TV movie
2012	Eléonore, l'intrépide	Liancourt	Ivan Calbérac	TV movie
2012	Les pirogues des hautes terres	Marcel	Olivier Langlois	TV movie
2012	Duo	Axel Lambert	Frédéric Krivine	TV mini-series
2013	Ce monde est fou	Monsieur Meillassoux	Badreddine Mokrani	TV movie
2013	Une femme dans la Révolution	Mirabeau	Jean-Daniel Verhaeghe	TV mini-series
2013	Vaugand	Pascal Varennes	Charlotte Brändström	TV series (1 episode)
2013	Boulevard du Palais	Chauvel	Jean-Marc Vervoort	TV series (1 episode)
2013	Enquêtes réservées	Marcel Albano	Étienne Dhaene	TV series (1 episode)
2014	Borderline	Joseph Dahan	Olivier Marchal	TV movie
2014	Ça va passer... Mais quand ?	André Laubier	Stéphane Kappes	TV movie
2014	Richelieu, la pourpre et le sang	Abbé Boisrobert	Henri Helman	TV movie
2014	Hôtel de la plage	Jeff	Christian Merret-Palmair	TV series (1 episode)
2015	Nina	Pierre	Éric Le Roux	TV series (1 episode)
2016	Lead Me Home	Officer Othman	Julien Hosmalin	TV movie
2016	Murders at Avignon	Dimitri Bellac	Stéphane Kappes	TV movie
2016	Mongeville	Emmanuel Voisin	Sylvie Ayme	TV series (1 episode)
2016	Duel au soleil	Castex	Didier Le Pêcheur	TV series (1 episode)
2016	Agathe Koltès	Marc Barthélémy	Christian Bonnet	TV series (2 episodes)
2016	Marseille	Pierre Chasseron	Florent Emilio Siri & Thomas Gilou	TV series (8 episodes)
2017	Les Brumes du Souvenir	Mirande	Sylvie Ayme	TV movie
2017	La stagiaire	Adrien Eckert	Stéphane Kappes	TV series (1 episode)
2017	Black Spot	Pierre Winkler	Thierry Poiraud	TV series (1 episode)
2017	Capitaine Marleau	Scientific Technician	Josée Dayan	TV series (1 episode)
2017	Hero Corp	Nacheem	Simon Astier	TV series (6 episodes)
2018	The law of Marion	Doctor Bernard	Stéphane Kappes	TV series (1 episode)
2018	Ben	Armand Parisi	Akim Isker	TV series (3 episodes)
2019	Murders at Cotentin	Gérard Bannier	Jérémy Minui	TV movie
2019	Candice Renoir	Charles Thenier	Pascal Lahmani	TV series (1 episode)
2019	Tropiques criminels	Jean Ferville	Stéphane Kappes	TV series (1 episode)
2021–22	J'ai tué mon mari	Rineau	Rémy Silk Binisti	TV series (5 episodes)
2022	Oussekine	Father Desjobert	Antoine Chevrollier	TV mini-series
2022	Cassandre	Louis Grandet	Mathilde Vallet	TV series (1 episode)
2022	I3P	Dr. Laperouse	Jérémy Minui	TV series (2 episodes)
2023	Class Act	Robert Vigouroux	Tristan Séguéla	TV mini-series

== Theater ==
Year	Title	Writer	Director	Notes
1983	Théo Pavillon	Bertrand Roger	Mario Gonzalez	Théâtre de Nîmes
1983	La Fleur au Fusil	François Maistre	François Maistre	Théâtre de Boulogne
1984	Hamlet	William Shakespeare	Catherine Dasté	Théâtre des Quartiers d'Ivry
1985	Le Théâtre Comique	Carlo Goldoni	Yves Pignot	Festival de Sète
1985	Une dernière soirée de Carnaval	Carlo Goldoni	Adriano Sinivia	Théâtre de la Voix Lactée
1986	Pericles, Prince of Tyre	William Shakespeare	Jean-Marie Nocret	Théâtre Le Ranelagh
1987	Dom Juan	Molière	Francis Huster	Théâtre du Rond-Point
1988	Le Bossu	Paul Féval	Michel Le Royer	Cirque d'hiver
1989	Voulez-vous jouer avec moâ ?	Marcel Achard	Pierre Aussedat	Théâtre de Bougival
1989	La Fontaine, séance tenante	Catherine Marsan	Catherine Marsan	
1990	Le Clavecin oculaire	Denis Diderot	Lisa Wurmser	Théâtre de la Tempête
1990	Quand tombent les toits	Henri Michaux	Jean Lacornerie	
1991	Les Tentations d'Antoine	Jacques Normand	Jean Lacornerie	
1991	Les Guerres picrocholines	François Rabelais	Pierre Pradinas	
1992	Six Characters in Search of an Author	Luigi Pirandello	Armand Delcampe	
1995	L'heure à laquelle nous ne savions rien l'un de l'autre	Luc Bondy	Luc Bondy	Théâtre du Châtelet
1996	Peine d'amour perdu	Laurent Pelly	Laurent Pelly	Odéon-Théâtre de l'Europe
1997	Histoires de France	Michel Deutsch	Georges Lavaudant	Théâtre de l'Athénée
1997	King Lear	William Shakespeare	Georges Lavaudant	Odéon-Théâtre de l'Europe
1998	Chaos debout	Véronique Olmi	Jacques Lassalle	Festival d'Avignon
1999	Les Saltimbanques		Jacques Lassalle	Théâtre du Capitole
2000	Life of Galileo	Bertolt Brecht	Jacques Lassalle	Théâtre National de la Colline
2001	The Screens	Jean Genet	Jacques Lassalle	Théâtre Nanterre-Amandiers
2001	Un fil à la patte	Georges Feydeau	Jacques Lassalle	Scène Nationale de Narbonne
2002	L'Ouest Solitaire		Jacques Lassalle	Cloître des Carmes
2002	Hedda Gabler	Henrik Ibsen	Jacques Lassalle	Espace 44
2003	Les Barbares	Maxime Gorki	Patrick Pineau	Odéon-Théâtre de l'Europe
2004	The Cherry Orchard	Anton Tchekhov	Georges Lavaudant	Odéon-Théâtre de l'Europe
2007	Je nous aime beaucoup	Véronique Olmi	Jacques Lassalle	Théâtre de Paris
2009	La Chapelle-en-Brie	Alain Gautré	Alain Gautré	Théâtre du Rond-Point
2010	A Doll's House	Henrik Ibsen	Michel Fau	Théâtre de la Madeleine
2014	Romeo and Juliet	William Shakespeare	Nicolas Briançon	Théâtre de la Porte Saint-Martin
2023	Happy Easter	Jean Poiret	Nicolas Briançon	Théâtre Marigny

== Awards and nominations ==
Year	Award	Nominated work	Result
2000	Bordeaux International Festival of Women in Cinema - Best Actor	Girls Can't Swim	Won
