= Élisabeth Fanger =

French writer

Élisabeth Fanger (born 1956) is the French author of J'avais dix-huit ans (English: I was 18), an autobiographical account of her adventures following her bank-robber boyfriend Sid Mohamed Badaoui on the run from Paris. The trip would lead them to Spain, Morocco, and eventually Greece. Fanger's novel was made into the 2004 Benoît Jacquot film À tout de suite (English translation of title: Right Away).

== Biography ==
Élisabeth Fanger, who went by Lili, was an attractive art student in Paris. The daughter of a wealthy French industrialist, she became bored of her bourgeoisie lifestyle. She met Sid Mohamed Badaoui ("Bada") at a bar on Paris's Champs Élysées in December 1974. Two months later, in February 1975, he called her explaining that he was on the run after a bank-robbery on Paris's Avenue de la République failed to go as planned, and resulted in a ten-hour hostage standoff that left a bank cashier and one of the robbers dead. Fanger gave Bada safe haven at her home, then fled the country with him, and with André Bellaïche (another man involved in the robbery), and Bellaïche's girlfriend.

Relying on the money from the robbery, they fled to Spain, then to Morocco, Bada's original home. Their travels together ended, however, when Fanger was detained for questioning by Greek customs authorities in Athens. Left without money, baggage, or friends, she struggled to survive alone in Greece.

Upon returning to France, she faced criminal charges of aiding the fugitives, and was defended by Robert Badinter. Fanger was found guilty and sentenced to prison, but received a pardon.

She published her autobiography J'avais dix-huit ans (I was 18) in 2004, and the book was made into the 2004 Benoît Jacquot film À Tout de Suite, starring Isild Le Besco as Lili.

Fanger now lives in the south of France, and focuses on her two passions: psychoanalysis and inventions.

== See also ==
- À tout de suite
- André Bellaïche
- Gang des postiches
