= Catherine Belkhodja =

French actress (born 1955)

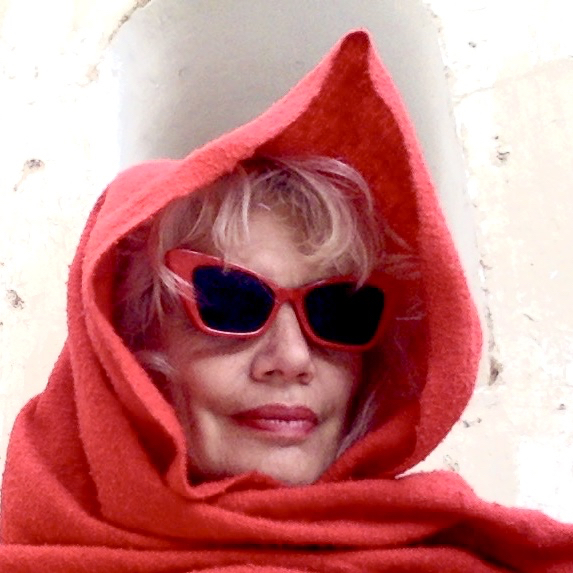
- Born: 15 April 1955 (age 71); Paris, France
- Occupations: Artist, actress, film director
- Children: 5, including: Maïwenn; Jowan Le Besco; Isild Le Besco; Kolia Litscher
- Relatives: Shanna Besson (granddaughter)

Catherine Belkhodja (born 15 April 1955) is a French artist, actress and film director.

== Early life ==
On 15 April 1955, Belkhodja was born in Paris, France, to an Algerian father and a French mother.

She lived and studied in Algiers where she wrote her first short stories. She went on studying theatre, music and fine arts, took her first steps in the cinema and left for Paris to read architecture, philosophy, town planning and ethnology of the Maghreb.

She graduated in philosophy and began earning her living as a teacher, then reading architecture, specialising in bioclimatics and working in the town planning department of the Paris Prefecture. She later took aesthetics with Olivier Revault d'Allones at the Sorbonne University, prior to leaving for Belgium to further her studies in solar architecture, then for Egypt to work with Hassan Fathy on earth architecture.

== Career ==
Belkhodja's activities range from the cinema and television to conceptual art, as well as journalism, philosophy and writing.

=== Cinema ===
On her return to Paris from Egypt, she enrolled at the Paris Academy of Dramatic Art and took her first steps in the cinema under Claire Devers in "Noir et Blanc" (Black and White), Guy Gilles in "Nuit docile" (Docile night), Jean-Pierre Limosin in "L'autre nuit" (The other night) and Benoît Peeters in "Le compte-rendu" (The Report). She was the central character in Chris Marker's Silent Movie and documentary Level Five.

=== Television ===
Belkhodja has collaborated on a number of television programmes, such as Moi-je, Sexy folies, Mosaïque, Envoyé spécial, Des racines et des ailes, Faut pas rêver, Océaniques.

While working on a television programme, she was noticed by Philippe Alfonsi, who asked her to present a new magazine he was setting up with Maurice Dugowson and invited her to help in its conception. Thus, came to life Taxi, a talk show in which Belkhodja and her guests would sit in a Cadillac driven by night around Paris. The programme was awarded a Sept d'or by the French television profession.

Following the success of this programme, Chris Marker gave her the role of a journalist in Level Five (1997). She then left for Algeria to make her first documentary Reflets perdus du miroir, the story of twin sisters who meet after a long separation.

=== Writing ===
Belkhodja published her first newspaper articles in Le Sauvage and Sans frontières and wrote her first script on her return from Egypt. She has worked as a reporter for the Gamma Agency, has also collaborated with such magazines as L'autre journal and La légende du siècle, has founded a new magazine specialising in Asian issues and collaborated with gastronomy, tourism and travel magazines.

She has refocused her activities on writing and regularly publishes her texts in literary reviews such as Alter texto, Hakaî, Poète, Carquois, les Cahiers de Poésie and Gong.

==== Karedas ====
Belkhodja founded Karedas, a company dedicated to film production and publishing, and launched a kaiseki collection dedicated to haiku. To inaugurate this collection, she called on Yves Brillon, a Canadian haiku poet who won two awards in the 2005 and 2006 haiku competitions organised by Karedas and the Japanese Cultural Centre in Paris. Belkhodja is currently running a haiku writing workshop on the Psychologies magazine website, in which she has presented keys to haiku writing.

==== Marco Polo magazine international haiku competition ====
This yearly competition set up in 2005 rewards the best haiku writers from ten countries.

- 18 May 2005: inaugural award ceremony at the House of Japan in Paris under the aegis of the Japanese Embassy in Paris.
- 25 November 2006: 2nd award ceremony at the Franco-Japanese Cultural Centre in Paris.
- 4 May 2007: 3rd award ceremony at the Tenri Centre, in the framework of the 9th edition of Printemps des Poètes whose theme was love.

== Filmography ==
=== Feature films ===
- 1980: La chanson du mal aimé by Claude Weisz
- 1981: Le Cadeau by Michel Lang
- 1982: Pour cent briques, t'as plus rien by Édouard Molinaro
- 1984: Une maille à l'endroit, une maille à l'envers by Madeleine Laïk
- 1986: Nuit docile by Guy Gilles
- 1986: Noir et blanc by Claire Devers
- 1987: Cinématon No. 999 by Gérard Courant
- 1988: L'Autre nuit by Jean Pierre Limousin
- 1996: The Proprietor by Ismail Merchant
- 1996: Level Five by Chris Marker
- 1997: Silent Movie by Chris Marker
- 1998: La Puce by Emmanuelle Bercot
- 2001: Roberto Succo by Cédric Kahn

=== Short films ===
- 1976: L'Étourdie by Annie Bertini
- 1980: Fragments du discours amoureux by Denis Lazerme
- 1984: Le Compte-rendu by Benoît Peeters
- 1985: Procès de l'oeuf by Catherine Belkhodja
- 1989: Getting Away with It by Chris Marker
- 1990: Yoyo by Catherine Belkhodja – Music score: Gabriel Yared
- 1991: Cinéma by Catherine Belkhodja – Music score: Gabriel Yared
- 1991: Place des Vosges with Isild Le Besco and Kolia Litscher
- 1993: Parfaitement imparfaite by and with Catherine Belkhodja

=== Television ===
- 1981: Point de rencontre by Michel Favart
- 1983: Der Fahnder by Erwin Keusch (Bavaria)
- 1985: Studio Lavabo by de Patrick Bouchitey (Canal +)
- 1986: Double – Face by Serge Leroy
- 1987: Marc et Sophie by Stéphane Barbier and Guy Gingembre
- 1988: Les hommes de bonne volonté from the novel by Jules Romains
- 1989: The Owl's Legacy by Chris Marker
- 1990: Berliner balade by Chris Marker (voice)
- 1987: Reflets perdus du miroir with Maïwenn Le Besco and Isild Le Besco

== Theatre appearances ==
- 1980: Bernarda's House by Federico Garcia Lorca – Théâtre de La Villette – directed by Youssef Hamid
- 1982: Pheadra – Théâtre de l'Atopie – directed by Norbet Heinbûrger
- 1986: Le voleur d'autobus – Théâtre Yerma – directed by Youssef Hamid

== Publications ==
=== Karedas ===
- L'ombre du caméléon by François Roche (Architecture, distributed by the Institut français d'architecture)
- Correspondance anachronique by Nam & Sor (essay)
- Peintures by Dominique Maraval (Art plastique collection)
- D'un instant à l'autre by Yves Brillon (Haiku, Kaiseki collection)
- Amas d'étoiles: collective work by award winners of MARCO POLO 2005 haiku competition (Haiku – Kaiseki collection)
- L'heure du thé by Diane Descôteaux (Haiku, Kaiseki collection)

=== Personal works ===
- Nuits blanches aux roches noires, Karedas, Kaiseki collection, Paris, 2007.

=== Collective works ===
- Haïdjins francophones, Karedas, Kaiseki collection, Paris, December 2007
- Amas d'étoiles, Karedas, February 2007, Paris
- Regards de femmes, Editions Adage, Montréal 2008
- Dix vues du haiku, AFH, Paris 2007
- La rumeur du coffre à jouets, L'Iroli, Paris 2008

=== Literary reviews ===
- Forcer à quitter (tanka), Haikai, Canada, June 2006
- Roches noires (juinku), Haikai, Canada, December 2006
- L'araignée de fer, Carquois n°18, Canada, June 2006
- Les félins attaquent les ombres (hankasen with Diane Descôteaux), Haikai, Canada, August 2006
- Rêve d'octobre en juillet (kasen with Diane Descôteaux), Haikai, Canada, October 2006
- Sic vitam hominum (kasen with Diane Descôteaux), Haikai, Canada, December 2006
- Talon d'Achille (with Diane Descôteaux), Haikai, Canada, April 2007
- Poumon cru (jusanbutsu with Pascale Baud), Haikai, Canada, October 2006
- Mélodie en sous-sol (jusanbutsu with Pascale Baud), Haikai, Canada, December 2006
- Haïkus allemands, traductions et commentaires, Gong n°12, July 2006
- Petite leçon de haïku, Psychologies Magazine, Paris, January 2007
- Self-bind mini-book (Conception), Marco Polo magazine n°12, Paris, November 2006
- Écho d'Asie, haiku press review, Marco Polo magazine n°12, Paris, November 2006
- Haïku : dans l'air du temps, Marco Polo magazine n°13, Paris, September 2007
- Les cahiers de poésie 6, Luxemburg, 2006 – ISBN 2-916090-68-1
- Les cahiers de poésie 7, Luxemburg, 2006 – ISBN 2-916090-71-1
- Revue Alter texto, New Caledonia, April 2006

== See also ==
- List of stage mothers
