= Europa Cinemas =

- Type: association
- Headquarters: 54, rue Beaubourg, 75003 Paris, France

Europa Cinemas is a pan-European association and network of film exhibitors founded in 1992 by Claude-Eric Poiroux.

The organisation was created in 1992 in the wake of the rollout of the MEDIA programme, which was a key backer of the association since its inception together with the French CNC. It was set up to provide operational and financial backing to cinemas programming a substantial share of non-national European screenings. In 2003, the association launched the 'Europa Cinemas Label' initiative, awarding the best films at the Cannes, Berlin, Venice, Karlovy Vary, and Locarno film festivals, with incentives for exhibitors. In 2023, Poiroux left the CEO post and was replaced by Fatima Djoumer.
