= Casanova, Last Love =

- Poster
- Directed by: Benoît Jacquot
- Screenplay by: Chantal Thomas; Jérôme Beaujour; Jacquot
- Based on: Histoire de ma vie by Giacomo Casanova
- Starring: Vincent Lindon; Stacy Martin
- Cinematography: Christophe Beaucarne
- Edited by: Julia Grégory
- Music by: Bruno Coulais
- Production companies: Les Films du Lendemain; JPG Films
- Distributed by: Diaphana Distribution
- Release date: 20 March 2019
- Running time: 98 minutes
- Countries: France; Belgium
- Language: French

Casanova, Last Love (French title: Dernier Amour) is a 2019 French historical drama film directed by Benoît Jacquot.

== Synopsis ==
In London in 1763, Casanova falls in love with Marianne de Charpillon, a young prostitute who refuses his advances.

== Cast ==
- Vincent Lindon: Giacomo Casanova
- Stacy Martin: Marianne de Charpillon
- Valeria Golino: La Cornelys
- Julia Roy: Cécile
- Nancy Tate: Hortense Stavenson
- Anna Cottis: Marianne's mother
- Hayley Carmichael: Anna
- Christian Erickson: Lord Pembroke
- Nathan Willcocks: Claremont
- Antonythasan Jesuthasan: Jarba

== Reception ==
According to Première, "The film suffers from a scholastic construction and a breath of passion that is stifled by a too cerebral approach. But it also has the qualities of its faults. In particular its (successful) desire to capture the intimate rather than the lavish spectacular of a libertine era". 20 minutes was more positive and stated, "The audience is swept away by the deep emotion that emanates from this reflection on desire". A critic from Variety wrote that "The deep well of Casanova lore offers many opportunities for refreshment, yet Benoît Jacquot’s version dips into surprisingly flat waters".
