= Pardonnez-moi =

- Film poster
- Directed by: Maïwenn
- Written by: Maïwenn
- Produced by: François Kraus; Maïwenn; Denis Pineau-Valencienne
- Starring: Maïwenn; Pascal Greggory; Hélène de Fougerolles; Aurélien Recoing
- Cinematography: Claire Mathon
- Edited by: Laure Gardette
- Music by: Mirwais Ahmadzaï
- Distributed by: SND Films
- Release date: 22 November 2006
- Running time: 88 minutes
- Country: France
- Language: French

Pardonnez-moi (French pronunciation: [paʁdɔne mwa]) is a 2006 French film written and directed by Maïwenn, starring Maïwenn, Pascal Greggory, Hélène de Fougerolles, and Aurélien Recoing. The film was retitled Forgive Me for the English-language international market. In 2007, Pardonnez-moi received two nominations for César Awards, France's most prestigious film awards, for Best First Feature Film and Most Promising Actress.

== Synopsis ==
A future mother, Violette, confronts camera in hand with a family secret inspired by her life: her incestuous relationship with her stepfather Paul (Aurélien Recoing), the biological father from her sister Nadia (Mélanie Thierry), whom she will end up wanting both as a father, and as a lover.

The film also evokes the nymphomania and the mythomania of her mother, Lola (Marie-France Pisier), the abuse inflicted by her father, Dominique (Pascal Greggory), the identification with her sister, Billy (Hélène de Fougerolles) and the narcissism of her spouse, Alex (Yannick Soulier).

== Influences ==
The title was to be Resilience, in reference to the concept of" Boris Cyrulnik, which evokes the reversal of the director's responsibilities, and the question of cognitive diversion, the consequence of a "long-awaited pardon, if happens, is not the one expected". Maïwenn says she prefers the forensic term "scanner" to the literary term autobiography. She talks about a fantasized story corresponding to what she would have liked to happen to her and did not have the courage to do in life.

Camille Kouchner said it clicked after the director's testimony. Her aunt, Marie-France Pisier, who plays the heroine's mother, describes the filming as "absolute madness", aggressiveness "distilling an impression of terrible danger", Maïwenn unable to put it "in the exact place of his fantasy" but declares not to have feared "the slaps", because as in love, "desire is never humiliating".

== Cast ==
- Maïwenn as Violette
- Pascal Greggory as Dominique
- Hélène de Fougerolles as Billy
- Aurélien Recoing as Paul
- Mélanie Thierry as Nadia
- Marie-France Pisier as Lola

== Critics ==
The magazine ELLE, describes the film as "neurotic and fictional psychodrama", Le Parisien, speaks of appropriation, Les Inrockuptibles of self-indulgence, pure and hard narcissism, egotism, half smart, half charmer, who wants to make “a documentary, especially not a fiction”, anticipating the “trial that we will not fail to bring against her”, Liberation, of voyeurism, Le Monde, of the troubled delight of autofiction, a technique with which "Ingmar Bergman, who has only ever filmed his intimate life, escapes pathetic infamy" and whose rise is "concomitant with that of reality TV", Première, of film-happening unburdened by any varnish, holding investigation, spitting, mourning work and raised fist, Rolling Stone, of staggering family therapy of psychological violence and Télérama, of fragile, excessive and rough film, brutally sincere.

== Analysis ==
In her book Gendered Frames, Embodied Cameras: Varda, Akerman, Cabrera, Calle, and Maïwenn (2016) Cybelle H. McFadden, of the University of North Carolina, explains that the "fake" fills the lack of reality through representation, creating a simulacrum, a copy without the original, in the manner of Jean Baudrillard and Sophie Calle., anticipating the criticisms, and allowing the director to anticipate the "false interview" of Paul, former lover of her mother and father of her half-sister, who serves as an opportunity to reconnect with their family.

For Alistair Fox, Michel Marie, Raphaëlle Moine, in A Companion to Contemporary French Cinema, the film Polisse is simply a more offbeat, more elaborate version of his first film, having explicitly admitted the restorative function of the film.

For Chloé Laborde, from the Geneva High School of Social Work, in The White Sheep: Invisible Suffering, Maïwenn disturbs like Christian in Festen, the family unites against her.
