= Noir et Blanc =

- Directed by: Claire Devers
- Screenplay by: Tennessee Williams (novel Le Masseur noir); Claire Devers
- Produced by: Claude-Eric Poiroux
- Starring: Francis Frappat; Jacques Martial; Joséphine Fresson
- Cinematography: Daniel Desbois; Christopher Doyle; Alain Lasfargues; Jean-Paul Rosa da Costa
- Edited by: Fabienne Alvarez-Giro; Yves Sarda
- Distributed by: Forum Distribution
- Release date: 1986
- Running time: 80 minutes
- Country: France
- Language: French

Noir et Blanc is a 1986 French film written and directed by Claire Devers.

== Cast ==
- Francis Frappat, Antoine
- Jacques Martial, Dominique
- Catherine Belkhodja, la femme de ménage
- Joséphine Fresson, Edith
- Benoît Régent, l'hôtelier
- Marc Berman, Roland
- Isaach de Bankolé
