= Kolia Litscher =

French stage and film actor (born 1991)

- Born: Kolia Litscher; 1991 (age 34–35); France
- Other name: Kolia Le Besco
- Occupations: Stage actor Film actor
- Years active: 1991–present
- Known for: Demi-tarif (2004); Charly (2006)
- Mother: Catherine Belkhodja
- Relatives: Maïwenn (sister); Jowan Le Besco (brother); Isild Le Besco (sister); Shanna Besson (niece)

Kolia Litscher (born 1991) is a French stage and film actor. In film he is particularly known for Demi-tarif (2004) and Charly (2006), which he appeared in at a young age. Both works were written, directed, and produced by his sister Isild Le Besco.

== Career ==
Kolia's first role was in Place des Vosges (1991), directed by his mother, when he was barely a toddler. He later appeared in short films by Emma de Caunes, Michel Fehler, Joséphine Flasseur and Emmanuelle Bercot.

His sister Isild featured him in a role in her directorial deut, Demi-tarif (2004). It was screened at more than 50 film festivals and widely praised by film critics.

Le Besco also cast him in Charly (2006), her second film as writer and director, He played Nicolas, a rebellious teenager, alongside Julie-Marie Parmentier as his partner. Nicolas has been in foster care; he is so fascinated by a postcard of Belle-Ile-en-Mer, that he runs away to try to reach it. As he hitchhikes to the suburbs of Nantes, he meets Charly, a young girl living in a caravan and surviving by prostitution.

Variety wrote that "Litscher is just this side of being as bored as his character."

=== Filmography ===
- 1991, Place des Vosges by Catherine Belkhodja
- 1996, La Puce (The Flea) by Emmanuelle Bercot
- 1998, Le nombril du monde by Emma de Caunes
- 1999, Je voudrais faire du cinéma by Michel Fehler
- 2000, T'es où? by Isild Le Besco
- 2003, Brûlure indienne (Indian Burn) by Joséphine Flasseur
- 2004, Demi-tarif (Half-Price) by Isild Le Besco
- 2006, Charly by Isild Le Besco

=== Theatre ===
- 2002, Denn Bleiben Ist Nirgend, directed by Hans-Peter Litscher. Akademietheater, Bayerische Staatsoper, Münchner Opern-festspiele, Munich.
- 2002, Und Dann Verschwand Alles Licht, an evening with texts from Antonoin Artaud, directed by Hans-Peter Litscher. Kasino Burgtheater, Vienna, Austria.
- 2003, Die Drei Entfernte Cousinen adapted from Anton Chekhov's The Three Sisters, directed by Hans-Peter Litscher. Neumarkt Theater Zürich.
- 2003, Causerie Sur Le Theme Du Traiter Et Du Heros, directed by Hans-Peter Litscher. Belluard Bollwerk International, Fribourg.
- 2003, CIRCULUS VITIOSUS, directed by Hans-Peter Litscher. Zürich Festival.
