= The Enraged =

Upcoming film by Emmanuelle Bercot

- French: L'Enragé
- Directed by: Emmanuelle Bercot
- Screenplay by: Emmanuelle Bercot; Armel Gourvennec
- Based on: L'Enragé by Sorj Chalandon
- Produced by: Sylvie Pialat; Benoit Quainon; Ardavan Safaee
- Starring: Marion Cotillard; Benoit Magimel; Aaron Debarre; Robin Dancoing; Christophe Montenez
- Production companies: Les Films du Worso; Pathé; France 2 Cinéma; Umedia Production
- Distributed by: Pathé
- Countries: France; Belgium
- Language: French

The Enraged (French: L'Enragé) is an upcoming historical drama film written and directed by Emmanuelle Bercot from a screenplay she co-wrote with Armel Gourvennec, based on the 2023 novel of the same name by Sorj Chalandon, inspired by the true story of 56 boys who escaped a juvenile penal colony on Belle-Île-en-Mer in France in 1934. It stars Marion Cotillard, Benoit Magimel, Aaron Debarre, Robin Dancoing and Christophe Montenez. The film is a co-production between France and Belgium. Pathé will release the film theatrically in France.

== Cast ==
- Marion Cotillard as Anne Kadarn
- Aaron Debarre as Jules Bonneau
- Benoit Magimel
- Robin Dancoing
- Christophe Montenez

== Production ==
=== Development ===
On 14 May 2025, Variety reported that Emmanuelle Bercot would adapt Sorj Chalandon's 2023 novel L'Enragé—which is inspired by a true story that happened in 1934 when 56 boys escaped a juvenile penal colony on Belle-Île-en-Mer in France—from a screenplay she co-wrote with Armel Gourvennec, and that Sylvie Pialat would produce it. The film is produced by Pialat and Benoit Quainon for France's Les Films du Worso and Ardavan Safaee for Pathé, in association with France 2 Cinéma and Belgium's Umedia Production.

=== Casting ===
On 2 February 2026, Marion Cotillard, Benoit Magimel, Aaron Debarre, Robin Dancoing and Christophe Montenez were announced in the cast. The Enraged marks Bercot's fourth collaboration with Magimel following Standing Tall (2015), 150 Milligrams (2016) and Peaceful (2021). On 3 February 2026, Vogue France announced that Debarre will play the lead role of Jules Bonneau, nicknamed "The Ringworm", while Cotillard will play Anne Kadarn, a nurse who helps the young fugitive after his escape.

=== Filming ===
Principal photography began on 2 February 2026 and wrapped on 30 April 2026. Filming locations in Brittany included Port-Louis, Morbihan, Belle Île, Quiberon and Cap Sizun in Finistère.

== Release ==
Pathé will release the film in France and handle international sales. Pathé launched sales for the film at the 2026 Cannes Film Festival.
