= Never Ever (2016 film) =

- Film poster
- French: À jamais
- Directed by: Benoît Jacquot
- Screenplay by: Julia Roy
- Based on: The Body Artist by Don DeLillo
- Produced by: Paulo Branco
- Starring: Mathieu Amalric; Julia Roy
- Cinematography: Julien Hirsch
- Edited by: Julia Gregory
- Music by: Bruno Coulais
- Production companies: Alfama Films Production; Leopardo Filmes
- Distributed by: Alfama Films (France)
- Release dates: 9 September 2016 (Venice); 23 November 2016 (France)
- Running time: 86 minutes
- Countries: France; Portugal
- Language: French
- Box office: $77,659

Never Ever (French: À jamais) is a 2016 mystery romance film directed by Benoît Jacquot, starring Mathieu Amalric and Julia Roy. Roy also wrote the screenplay for the film, based on Don DeLillo's novel The Body Artist. The film had its world premiere at the 73rd Venice International Film Festival on 9 September 2016.

== Plot ==
A performance artist Laura meets a film director Rey. The two fall in love and get married. After Rey dies of a motorcycle accident, Laura feels alone in her house.

== Cast ==
- Mathieu Amalric as Rey
- Julia Roy as Laura
- Jeanne Balibar as Isabelle
- Victória Guerra as Marie
- Elmano Sancho as the producer
- José Neto as the owner
- Hugo Pedro as journalist

== Production ==
In 2013, it was reported that Luca Guadagnino would direct a film adaptation of Don DeLillo's novel The Body Artist and Isabelle Huppert, Denis Lavant, and David Cronenberg would star in the film. In 2015, it was reported that Benoît Jacquot would direct the film and Mathieu Amalric and Jeanne Balibar would star in the film. In that year, it was reported that Julia Roy had joined the cast. Roy also wrote the screenplay for the film. Filming took place in Portugal.

== Release ==
The film had its world premiere at the 73rd Venice International Film Festival on 9 September 2016. It was also screened at the 2016 Toronto International Film Festival and the 29th Tokyo International Film Festival. It was released in France on 23 November 2016.

== Reception ==
Guy Lodge of Variety called the film "an enjoyably slinky but disposable divertissement from director Benoit Jacquot that is unlikely to leave viewers quite as haunted as its characters." Neil Young of The Hollywood Reporter commented that "it palpably aspires to be a classily highbrow kind of romantic ghost story with psychological thriller undertones, but falls laughably short of its goals."
