= Childhoods (film) =

- Film poster
- Enfances
- Directed by: Yann Le Gal; Isild Le Besco; Joana Hadjithomas; Khalil Joreige; Ismaël Ferroukhi; Corinne Garfin; Safy Nebbou
- Written by: Yann Le Gal
- Produced by: Laurence Darthos
- Starring: Julie Gayet; Isild Le Besco; Elsa Zylberstein; Emmanuelle Bercot; Clotilde Hesme; Anne Benoît
- Cinematography: Toni Malamatelios; Jowan Le Besco; Benoît Chamaillard; Lubomir Bakchev; Stéphane Patti; Éric Guichard
- Edited by: Tina Baz Le Gal; Julia Grégory; Liza Ignazi; Bernard Sasia
- Music by: Evgueni Galperine; Tal Haddad
- Production companies: Tara Films; Arte France; Papaye
- Distributed by: Zelig Films Distribution
- Release dates: 2 October 2007 (Hamburg); 14 May 2008 (France)
- Running time: 80 minutes
- Country: France
- Languages: French; English
- Box office: $140,148

Childhoods (original title: Enfances) is a 2007 French anthology film directed by Yann Le Gal, Isild Le Besco, Joana Hadjithomas, Khalil Joreige, Ismaël Ferroukhi, Corinne Garfin and Safy Nebbou. Although a French reference gives its running time as 84 minutes, other resources indicate 80 minutes, with the work, in its entirety, composed of six vignettes, between 10 and 15 minutes in length, each by a different director, depicting formative incidents in the pre-adolescent lives of iconic filmmakers Fritz Lang, Orson Welles, Jacques Tati, Jean Renoir, Alfred Hitchcock and Ingmar Bergman, with each segment structured to resemble its subject's familiar signature style.

Written by Yann Le Gal, the director of the Fritz Lang segment, the project was realized during 2006–07 and premiered in Germany at the Hamburg Film Festival.

== Segments ==
The film's opening vignette, a namesake of the future director's 1948 film, Secret Beyond the Door, takes place in 1900 Vienna, as Fritz Lang (1890–1976) accidentally discovers, at the age of 10, that his mother who, to spare her children the burden of antisemitism, had converted to Catholicism that year, is Jewish.

The second segment, "The Gaze of a Child", directed by Isild Le Besco, moves to 1924 Chicago in depicting a deeply traumatic moment in the young life of Orson Welles (1915–1985), whose beloved mother dies four days after his ninth birthday.

The third story, "Open the Door, Please", directed by Joana Hadjithomas and Khalil Joreige, is set in 1919 France, portraying an incident during the schooldays of Jacques Tati (1907–1982) who, at 12, was 180 cm [nearly 5' 11"], thus distorting the composition of the class photograph being taken with him and his much shorter fellow pupils.

Part four, "The Pair of Shoes", directed by Ismaël Ferroukhi, also set in France, but fourteen years earlier, in 1905, shows Jean Renoir (1894–1979), age 11, vacationing, as usual, at the country estate of his father, renowned painter Pierre-Auguste Renoir, when an encounter with a slightly older peasant boy opens his eyes to the hidden meanings of life in the country and also teaches him about the unfairness of social class divisions.

Story number five, "Short Night", directed by Corinne Garfin and set in 1907, selects a moment in the life of 8-year-old Alfred Hitchcock (1899–1980), a sensitive child with an unsympathetic and authoritarian mother, who, awakening in the middle of a dark and terrifying night in the London suburb of Leytonstone, calls out in fright, with no one to answer his cries.

The final tale, "A Birth", directed by Safy Nebbou, takes place in the Swedish city of Uppsala, giving a portrait of Ingmar Bergman (1918–2007), age 4, traumatized and unsettled while awaiting the 1922 birth of his sister.

== Cast ==
- Maurice Antoni as Pierre-Auguste Renoir
- Maxime Juravliov as Jacques Tati
- Virgil Leclaire as Fritz Lang
- Max Renaudin Pratt as Ingmar Bergman
- Elsa Zylberstein as Ingmar Bergman's mother
- Pascal Elso as Ingmar Bergman's father
- Anne Benoît as Aline Renoir
- Julie Gayet as Fritz Lang's mother
- Isild Le Besco as Orson Welles's aunt
- Emmanuelle Bercot as Orson Welles's mother
- Vincent Solignac as Alfred Hitchcock's father
- Margot Meynard as Alfred Hitchcock's mother
- Clotilde Hesme as Gabrielle
- Jonathan Joss as Dolph Lang
