= The Great Journey =

- French: Le Grand Voyage
- Directed by: Ismaël Ferroukhi
- Written by: Ismaël Ferroukhi
- Produced by: Humbert Balsan
- Starring: Nicolas Cazalé; Mohamed Majd
- Distributed by: Pyramide Distribution
- Release date: September 7, 2004
- Running time: 108 minutes
- Countries: France; Morocco; Bulgaria; Turkey
- Languages: Moroccan Arabic; French

The Great Journey (French: Le Grand Voyage) is a 2004 film written and directed by Ismaël Ferroukhi. The film portrays the relationship between father and son as both embark on a religious pilgrimage trip by car. The film won the Golden Astor for Best Film at the 2005 Mar del Plata International Film Festival, also was shown at the prestigious 2004 Toronto and Venice International Film Festivals.

== Plot ==
Réda (Nicolas Cazalé) is a French-Moroccan teenager due to sit for his Baccalauréat in southern France. When his devout father (played by Mohamed Majd) asks Réda to drive him on a pilgrimage to Mecca, he reluctantly agrees. The route taken by the father and son goes from Provence, France through Italy, Slovenia, Croatia, Serbia, Bulgaria, Turkey, Syria, and Jordan before reaching Saudi Arabia.

During this road trip of thousands of kilometers, the once-icy father-and-son relationship starts to thaw. Réda speaks only in French to his father, who is seen speaking only Arabic. Later, the father shows that he speaks impeccable French: his choice to speak only Arabic to his son is, therefore, purposeful.

Along the way, the two meet several interesting characters, including an aged woman clad in black who, though they attempt to leave her behind, reappears in various scenes. The son learns about Islam and why his father preferred to go by car rather than plane. Different situations show differences between the father and son. In one instance, for example, after the father claimed to have been robbed, Réda refuses to give any of the remaining money to a begging mother with a child, but his father does so.

During their journey, Réda dreams that he is watching his father herding goats and that his father does not respond when he calls for help to be saved from quicksand.

After many hardships, they reach Mecca but the father, unknown to Réda, dies shortly after they arrive. That night, Réda goes looking for his father, but instead sees a person herding goats who barely glances at him. After Réda finds out that his father has died, he sells the car and gives the money to a beggar.

== Cast ==
- Nicolas Cazalé – Réda
- Mohamed Majd – The Father
- Jacky Nercessian – Mustapha
- Ghina Ognianova – The old woman
- Kamel Belghazi – Khalid
- Atik Mohamed – Le pélerin Ahmad

== Production ==
Most scenes that were set in the Middle East were shot in Morocco. However, some scenes involving the two principal actors were shot in Mecca. While the Saudi Arabian government had previously permitted documentary crews to shoot in Mecca, this was the first fiction feature permitted to shoot during the Hajj. The film's director, Ismaël Ferroukhi, said that while shooting in Mecca, "no one looked at the camera; people didn't even seem to see the crew – they're in another world."

== Reception ==
Le Grand Voyage has an 86% approval rating on Rotten Tomatoes based on 7 reviews, with an average rating of 7/10.
