= La Morsure des dieux =

2017 film by Cheyenne Carron]

- Film poster
- Directed by: Cheyenne Carron
- Written by: Cheyenne Carron
- Produced by: Cheyenne Carron; Julie Guittard
- Starring: Fleur Geffrier; François Pouron
- Cinematography: Prune Brenguier
- Edited by: Stéphan Kootosüis
- Production company: Hésiode Productions
- Distributed by: Hésiode Productions
- Release date: 26 April 2017
- Running time: 130 minutes
- Country: France
- Language: French

La Morsure des dieux ("The Bite of the Gods" in French) is a 2017 French drama film written and directed by Cheyenne Carron, starring Fleur Geffrier and François Pouron. It tells the story of a financially troubled farmer in the French Basque Country.

== Plot ==
In the countryside of the French Basque Country, the goat farmer Sébastien has financial troubles and unsuccessfully tries to convince his bank to reduce his credit debts. He forms an agricultural cooperative with his colleagues Lucien and Laurent. It initially seems to go well as they receive some political support.

Sébastien is lonely on his farm and in conflict with his father. He meets Juliette, a woman whose car breaks down near his farm, and although initially somewhat hostile, the two form a bond. Juliette is a Catholic but Sébastian is a neopagan; he has an altar with images of gods and shows Juliette places in the area he considers sacred. Despite their differences, they become lovers and start to live together.

Things go bad for the cooperative: Lucien's debts forces him to sell his livestock and he hangs himself, there is tension between the members, and the sales are not good enough. Unable to convince his bank to decrease his debts, Sébastien closes his bank account and gives his remaining money to the cooperative. He decides to go on a long trip along the roads, hoping Juliette will wait for him.

== Cast ==
- Fleur Geffrier as Juliette
- François Pouron as Sébastien
- Pierre Molinier as Lucien
- Laurent Lucmaret as the priest
- Cyrille Campri as Laurent
- Pascal Elso as the financial advisor

== Production ==
La Morsure des dieux was the eighth feature film written and directed by Cheyenne Carron, a self-taught filmmaker raised by a Catholic foster family.

== Reception ==
La Morsure des dieux had a theatrical release in France on 26 April 2017. Le Monde's Murielle Joudet and Le Figaro's Marie-Noëlle Tranchant stressed the nonconformism and willingness to address sensitive subjects that runs throughout Carron's filmography. Joudet called La Morsure des dieux an "ode to an increasingly distressed French peasantry", made with "disarming care and seriousness", but wrote that the film suffers from relying too much on voice-over rather than action. Tranchant wrote that Carron has captured the Basque countryside beautifully, and used it to contrast an idealised sense of harmony, tradition and mystery against a "world of efficiency and profitability". Jérémie Courston of Télérama wrote that the film combines "naivety and grandiloquence" with "surprising moments of pastoral lyricism". Tranchant compared it to the works of François Dupeyron and Courston described Carron as a cross between Alain Guiraudie and Bruno Dumont.
