= Angers European First Film Festival =

French film festival in Angers

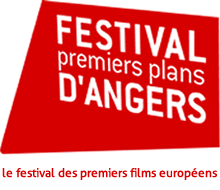
- Official logo
- Location: Angers, France
- Founded: 1989
- Directors: Claude-Eric Poiroux
- Language: International
- Website: https://www.premiersplans.org/festival/en/

The Angers European First Film Festival (French: Festival Premiers Plans d'Angers) is an annual film festival held in the city of Angers, France every January since 1989, dedicated to European cinema.

== History ==
The first edition of this festival took place in 1989 at the initiative of its current delegate general Claude-Eric Poiroux, founder of the art house cinema Les 400 coups in Angers, and of a group of moviegoers.

Since 2011, the festival collaborates with the Beijing First Film Festival.

In 2013, it attracted nearly 70,000 festival-goers. By 2014, over 2200 films were submitted annually, more than 300 were selected for different sections. In 2016, admissions were estimated to be more than 76,000 and more than 150,000 euros in prizes awarded to films selected by juries or spectators.

== Jury presidents ==
Over the years, seminal figures in the world of cinematography have chaired the jury:

- 1989 : Theo Angelopoulos
- 1990 : Henri Alekan
- 1991 : Vojtěch Jasný
- 1992 : André Téchiné
- 1993 : Jane Birkin
- 1994 : Andrzej Żuławski
- 1995 : Bertrand Tavernier
- 1996 : Freddy Buache
- 1997 : Agnieszka Holland
- 1998 : Claude Chabrol
- 1999 : Lucian Pintilie
- 2000 : Agnès Varda
- 2001 : Pavel Lungin
- 2002 : Nathalie Baye
- 2003 : Jeanne Moreau
- 2004 : Benoît Jacquot
- 2005 : Jacqueline Bisset and Claude Miller
- 2006 : Radu Mihaileanu
- 2007 : Abderrahmane Sissako
- 2008 : Sandrine Bonnaire
- 2009 : Claire Denis and Raoul Servais
- 2010 : Lucas Belvaux and Matthias Luthardt
- 2011 : Robert Guédiguian and Tonie Marshall
- 2012 : Christophe Honoré and Mathieu Demy
- 2013 : Noémie Lvovsky and Fabienne Godet
- 2014 : Catherine Corsini
- 2015 : Laurent Cantet and Jiri Barta
- 2017 : Lambert Wilson
- 2018 : Catherine Deneuve
- 2019 : Cédric Kahn and Michael Dudok de Wit
- 2020 : Juliette Binoche and Claude Barras
- 2021 : Pierre Salvadori
- 2022 : Melvil Poupaud
- 2023
- 2024 : Robin Campillo
