= Clément (film) =

2001 film

- Film poster
- Directed by: Emmanuelle Bercot
- Written by: Emmanuelle Bercot
- Produced by: Philippe Martin; Frédéric Niedermayer
- Starring: Olivier Guéritée
- Cinematography: Crystel Fournier
- Edited by: Julien Leloup
- Distributed by: Pyramide Distribution
- Release date: 17 May 2001
- Running time: 139 minutes
- Country: France
- Language: French

Clément is a 2001 French drama film directed by Emmanuelle Bercot. It was screened in the Un Certain Regard section at the 2001 Cannes Film Festival.

== Cast ==
- Olivier Guéritée as Clément
- Emmanuelle Bercot as Marion
- Kevin Goffette as Benoît
- Rémi Martin as Franck
- Lou Castel as François
- Catherine Vinatier as Aurore
- Jocelyn Quivrin as Mathieu
- David Saada as Maurice
- Eric Chadi as Julien
- Yves Verhoeven as Patrick
- Nicolas Buchoux as Barman discothèque
- Fiona Casalta as Mathilde
- Joël Curtz as Copain Clément
- Cyril Descours as Copain Clément
- Catherine Guillot as Mère Clément
- Aurélie Lepley as Copain Clément
- Damien Moratti as Copain Clément
- Eddy Okba as Copain Clément
- José Mambolongo Togbe as Videur discothèque
- Adrian Touati as Copain Clément
