= Girls Can't Swim =

- Film poster
- Directed by: Anne-Sophie Birot
- Written by: Anne-Sophie Birot; Christophe Honoré
- Produced by: Philippe Jacquier
- Starring: Isild Le Besco; Karen Alyx; Pascale Bussières; Pascal Elso; Marie Rivière; Yelda Reynaud; Sandrine Blancke; Julien Cottereau; Dominique Lacarrière
- Cinematography: Nathalie Durand
- Edited by: Pascale Chavance
- Music by: Ernest Chausson
- Production company: Centre National de la Cinématographie
- Distributed by: Haut et Court
- Release date: 18 October 2000 (France)
- Running time: 102 minutes
- Country: France
- Language: French
- Box office: $69,250

Girls Can't Swim (French: Les Filles ne savent pas nager) is a 2000 French coming of age drama film. The film had its world premiere at the 2000 Montreal World Film Festival and was released in France on 18 October of that year. It was given a limited theatrical release in the United States on 19 April 2002.

== Plot ==
Gwen is a teenager living in a coastal town in Brittany; Lise is her city-living best friend. They meet up each summer as Lise's family visits. This year's visit is different though - Lise is dealing with her distant father's death, and Gwen has become promiscuous with boys, which threatens to affect the girls' friendship.

== Cast ==
- Isild Le Besco as Gwen
- Karen Alyx as Lise
- Pascale Bussières as Céline
- Pascal Elso as Alain
- Marie Rivière as Anne-Marie
- Yelda Reynaud as Solange
- Sandrine Blancke as Vivianne
- Julien Cottereau as Frédo
- Dominique Lacarrière as Rose

== Reception ==
Stephen Holden of the New York Times said "Girls Can't Swim ultimately lacks the epic dimension of Y Tu Mamá También, but its vision of that awkward age when sex threatens to overwhelm everything else is acute enough to make everyone who has been there squirm with recognition."

Leslie Camhi of The Village Voice gave a positive review, writing “[Birot’s] film falters when it takes a final, violent turn into melodrama. Until then, though, she captures the deep currents of love and rivalry that make female teen friendships so important and so volatile.”

Jamie Russell of the BBC reviewed the film positively, stating “Sexual politics aside, what makes 'Girls Can't Swim' so involving is debut filmmaker Anne Sophie-Birot's nicely observed script, which treats its adolescent heroines with a wonderful amount of compassion.”

Paula Nechak of the Seattle Post-Intelligencer said, “Birot delves into subtexts on the principles of transference: the Oedipal attachments to their fathers that the girls renounce in order to gain other love objects. Her exploration of these psychological tenets in the context of modern teen behavior makes for darkly compelling and fresh viewing.”

On the other hand, Charles Taylor of Salon gave a negative review, writing, “Everything about 'Girls Can't Swim,’ even its passages of sensitive observation, feels secondhand, familiar—and not in a good way.” Roger Ebert gave the film two stars, saying "The phrase ‘coming of age,' when applied to movies, almost always implies sex, but Girls Can't Swim has nothing useful to say about sex (certainly not compared to Catherine Breillat's brilliant Fat Girl from last year), and is too jerky in structure to inspire much empathy from us."

The film has a 71% approval based on 34 reviews on review aggregator website Rotten Tomatoes.
