= The Musician Killer =

1975 film

- Directed by: Benoît Jacquot
- Written by: Benoît Jacquot; Fyodor Dostoyevsky
- Produced by: Stéphane Tchalgadjieff
- Starring: Anna Karina
- Cinematography: Bruno Nuytten
- Edited by: Fanette Simonet
- Release dates: May 1975 (Cannes); 17 March 1976 (France)
- Running time: 128 minutes
- Country: France
- Language: French

The Musician Killer (French: L'Assassin musicien) is a 1975 French drama film directed by Benoît Jacquot and starring Anna Karina.

== Cast ==
- Anna Karina - Louise
- Joël Bion - Gilles
- Hélène Coulomb - Anne
- Gunars Larsens - Storm
- Philippe March - Le directeur
- Howard Vernon - Anton Varga
- Daniel Isoppo - Le chômeur
- Boris De Vinogradov - Le chef d'orchestre
- Elise Ross - La cantatrice
- Elisabeth Strauss - L'hôtesse
- Antoine Leroy - Le jeune élève
