= Neneh Superstar =

2022 French film by Ramzi Ben Sliman

- Theatrical release poster
- Directed by: Ramzi Ben Sliman
- Screenplay by: Ramzi Ben Sliman
- Produced by: Rémi Cervoni; Sidonie Dumas; Marc Vadé
- Starring: Oumy Bruni Garrel; Maïwenn
- Cinematography: Antony Diaz
- Edited by: Basile Belkhiri
- Music by: Jean-Bohémond Leguay
- Production companies: Gaumont; France 2 Cinéma
- Distributed by: Gaumont
- Release dates: 3 June 2022 (Festival du Film de Demain); 25 January 2023 (France)
- Running time: 96 min
- Country: France
- Language: French
- Budget: €5,4 million
- Box office: $424,548

Neneh Superstar is a 2022 French comedy drama film written and directed by Ramzi Ben Sliman, starring Oumy Bruni Garrel and Maïwenn. The film made its world premiere in the main competition at the Festival du Film de Demain on 3 June 2022, and was released theatrically in France by Gaumont on 25 January 2023.

== Plot ==
Neneh is a 12-year-old black girl who dreams of becoming a ballerina at the Paris Opera Ballet School. Despite her enthusiasm, Neneh will have to redouble her efforts to escape from her condition and be accepted by the director of the school, Marianne Belage.

== Cast ==
- Oumy Bruni Garrel as Neneh
- Maïwenn as Marianne Bel-Hadj
- Aïssa Maïga as Martine
- Steve Tientcheu as Fred
- Cédric Kahn as Jean-Claude Kahane
- Alexandre Steiger as Alexandre Boucher
- Richard Sammel as Victor Max
- Nathalie Richard as Jeanne-Marie Meursault
- Marilyne Canto as Emmanuelle Braque
- Illonna Grimaudo as Ilonna
- Gloria-Divine Sazi as Gloria
- Julia Albos as Julia
- Marie Baconnet as Mme Henri
- Lionel Laget as Gardien de la paix

== Production ==
Neneh Superstar was co-produced by Gaumont and France 2 Cinéma, and pre-purchased by Canal+ and Ciné+ when the film was still in post-production. Gaumont handles both the film's distribution in France and international sales.

While preparing this film, director Ramzi Ben Sliman watched many documentaries, in particular Graines d'étoiles by Françoise Marie, which follows students of the Paris Opera Ballet over the years.

Director Ramzi Ben Sliman wrote the film for Maïwenn, who portrays the inflexible headmistress Marianne Belage, who refuses to accept Neneh into her ballet school. "I did not consider any other actress, and her film DNA confirmed my choice", Sliman said. Mehdi Kerkouche was the film's choreographer.

To find an actress to portray the role of Neneh, Sliman searched in France and in particular in the DOM-TOMs, in all the French-speaking countries, in Mali, Senegal, etc. He found girls with acting potential, but who did not dance well enough. Sliman said in the film's press kit:

And then I became aware of this other glass ceiling: little black girls give up ballet very early, because they see no future for them. We were in the middle of Covid, the situation was getting tense. And finally, while we were "casting" the other little girls, mainly from two dance classes in Paris, they all told me about the same dancer, whom I met in classes and competitions. It was Oumy Bruni Garrel. The filmed interview quickly proved to be convincing. She had a great screen presence, really. She also explained to me that she had been to protests in support of George Floyd, that she sometimes suffered from being black in the world of classical dance. I understood, then, that she had enough to build and portray the character of Neneh. Having searched for her all over the world for months, the irony of fate wanted her to live with her parents 200 meters from my house.

Bruni Garrel said the film made her think of her own story. "We both suffered things," she told AFP.

=== Filming ===
Sliman and his team were not able to shoot in Nanterre, where the Paris Opera Ballet School is located, so they had to shoot the film at the École Centrale in Saclay, which has the same aesthetic. "Hence this (almost) optical illusion, for those who know Nanterre", the director explained. Filming began on 7 June 2021 and wrapped on 4 August 2021.

== Marketing ==
The film's first official poster was unveiled on 10 November 2022. The official trailer was released by Gaumont on 23 November 2022. Unifrance unveiled a new trailer with English subtitles on 21 March 2023.

== Release ==
The film made its world premiere in the main competition at the Festival du Film de Demain in Vierzon, France on 3 June 2022. It had a sold-out screening at the London Film Festival on 8 October 2022. The film was released in theaters in France by Gaumont on 25 January 2023. It was screened at the Rendez-Vous With French Cinema at the Lincoln Center in New York City on 7 March 2023.

== Soundtrack ==
The album with the film's soundtrack, composed by Jean-Bohémond Leguay, was released on 20 January 2023.

== Reception ==
AlloCiné, a French cinema website, gave the film an average rating of 2.9/5, based on a survey of 13 French reviews.

== Awards and nominations ==
Year	Award / Film Festival	Category	Recipient(s)	Result	Ref(s)
2022	Festival du Film de Demain	Best Feature Film	Ramzi Ben Sliman	Nominated	
2022	Mon Premier Festival	Jury Prize - Best Film	Ramzi Ben Sliman	Won	
