= If You Don't, I Will =

2014 film

- Theatrical release poster
- Directed by: Sophie Fillières
- Written by: Sophie Fillières
- Produced by: Martine Marignac; Maurice Tinchant
- Starring: Emmanuelle Devos; Mathieu Amalric; Anne Brochet; Laurent Poitrenaux; Joséphine de La Baume; Nelson Delapalme; Julia Roy; Anthony Paliotti
- Cinematography: Emmanuelle Collinot
- Edited by: Valerie Loiseleux
- Music by: Christophe
- Distributed by: Les Films du Losange
- Release dates: 8 February 2014 (Berlin); 5 March 2014 (France)
- Running time: 102 minutes
- Country: France
- Language: French

If You Don't, I Will (French: Arrête ou je continue) is a 2014 French comedy film directed by Sophie Fillières. The film had its premiere in the Panorama section of the 64th Berlin International Film Festival.

== Cast ==
- Emmanuelle Devos as Pomme
- Mathieu Amalric as Pierre
- Anne Brochet as Sonja
- Joséphine de La Baume as Mellie
- Nelson Delapalme as Romain
- Julia Roy as Simone
- David Clark as John
- Laurent Poitrenaux as Marouani
- Anthony Paliotti as "La mort"
- Alexandre Pous as Tom

== Reception ==
The film has a rating of 74% based on 19 reviews at Rotten Tomatoes.
