= A Moment of Happiness (2001 film) =

2001 French film

- Directed by: Antoine Santana
- Written by: Antoine Santana; Eric Herbette
- Produced by: Alain Rozanès; Pascal Verroust
- Starring: Isild Le Besco; Malik Zidi
- Cinematography: Romain Winding
- Edited by: Nadine Verdier
- Music by: Louis Sclavis
- Production company: ADR Productions
- Distributed by: Velvet Films
- Release date: 2001
- Running time: 85 minutes
- Country: France
- Language: French

A Moment of Happiness (French: Un moment de bonheur) is a 2001 French drama film directed by Antoine Santana, in his feature film debut, and starring Isild Le Besco and Malik Zidi.

The film premiered at the 58th edition of the Venice Film Festival, in the Venice International Film Critics' Week sidebar. For his performance, Zidi was nominated for the César Award for Best Male Revelation.

== Cast ==
- Isild Le Besco as Betty
- Malik Zidi as Philippe
- Vincent Bonnafous as Damien
- Catherine Davenier as the mother
- Olivier Gourmet as the father
- Sylvie Testud as the teacher
- Bernard Blancan as Edmond
- Dominique Valadié as Cécile
- Jowan Le Besco as Gérard
