= Les Marins perdus =

- Directed by: Claire Devers
- Screenplay by: Jean-Claude Izzo (novel Les Marins perdus); Claire Devers; Jean-Pol Fargeau
- Produced by: Maurice Bernart
- Starring: Bernard Giraudeau; Miki Manojlović; Sergio Peris-Mencheta
- Cinematography: Christophe Pollock
- Edited by: Aurique Delannoy
- Music by: Stéphane Moucha; Gabriel Yared
- Distributed by: ID Distribution
- Release date: 2003
- Running time: 107 minutes
- Country: France
- Language: French

Les Marins perdus is a 2003 French film based on a novel by Jean-Claude Izzo. It was written and directed by Claire Devers.

== Cast ==
- Bernard Giraudeau : Diamantis
- Miki Manojlović : Abdul Aziz
- Sergio Peris-Mencheta : Nedim
- Marie Trintignant : Mariette
- Audrey Tautou : Lalla
- Nozha Khouadra : Gaby
- Darry Cowl : Falco
- Bakary Sangaré : Ousbène
- Ivan Franěk : The Moroccan
- Miglen Mirtchev : Subotica
- Maryline Even : Gisèle
- Moussa Maaskri : Sergio
- Amina Annabi : Amina
- Bernard Verley : Mariette's father
