= Backstage (2005 film) =

- Directed by: Emmanuelle Bercot
- Written by: Emmanuelle Bercot; Jérôme Tonnerre
- Produced by: Caroline Benjo
- Starring: Emmanuelle Seigner; Noémie Lvovsky
- Cinematography: Agnès Godard
- Edited by: Julien Leloup
- Music by: Laurent Marimbert
- Distributed by: Haut et Court
- Release date: 16 November 2005
- Running time: 155 minutes
- Country: France
- Language: French
- Budget: $3.8 million
- Box office: $272.000

Backstage is a French film directed by Emmanuelle Bercot, released in 2005. It was screened in the Official Selection (Out of Competition) category of the 62nd Venice International Film Festival.

== Synopsis ==
Lucie, who is 17 years old, is an ordinary teenager and a fan of the popular singer, Lauren Marks, played by Emmanuelle Seigner. One day, Lucie's destiny leads her to enter into the life of her idol.

== Cast ==
- Emmanuelle Seigner as Lauren Marks
- Isild Le Besco as Lucie
- Noémie Lvovsky as Juliette
- Valéry Zeitoun as Seymour
- Samuel Benchetrit as Daniel
- Edith Le Merdy as Marie-Line
- Jean-Paul Walle Wa Wana as Jean-Claude
- Mar Sodupe as Nanou
- Éric Lartigau as the director
- Lise Lamétrie as the chambermaid
- Joëlle Miquel as Gisèle
