= Level Five (film) =

1997 film

- DVD cover
- Directed by: Chris Marker
- Written by: Chris Marker
- Produced by: Anatole Dauman; Françoise Widhoff
- Starring: Catherine Belkhodja
- Cinematography: Yves Angelo; Gérard de Battista; Chris Marker
- Release date: 19 February 1997
- Running time: 106 minutes
- Country: France
- Language: French
- Box office: $24,751

Level Five is a 1997 French pseudo-documentary or fake documentary film, directed by Chris Marker and starring Catherine Belkhodja.

== Plot ==
Laura, the widow of a computer programmer, attempts to overcome her grief by completing her late husband's last work, a video game reconstruction of the Battle of Okinawa in which she hopes to simulate an alternative outcome to the historical tragedy. All the while she documents the process, intending to provide the material for a new film by her late husband's friend Chris Marker.

== Cast ==
- Catherine Belkhodja as Laura
- Chris Marker as himself and narrator
- Kenji Tokitsu, martial artist, interviewed as himself
- Nagisa Oshima, cineast, interviewed as himself
- Ju'nishi Ushiyama as himself
- Kinjo Shigeaki as himself

== Reception ==
Keith Uhlich of The A.V. Club named the re-release of Level Five the sixth-best film of 2014, tying it with The Congress.
