= Shanna Besson =

French actress and photographer

- Born: Shanna Leila Besson; 3 January 1993 (age 33)
- Occupations: Actress, photographer
- Parent(s): Luc Besson; Maïwenn Le Besco
- Relatives: Catherine Belkhodja (grandmother); Thalia Besson (half-sister); Jowan Le Besco (uncle); Isild Le Besco (aunt); Kolia Litscher (uncle)

Shanna Leila Besson (born 3 January 1993) is a French actress and photographer. She is the only child of French film directors Maïwenn and Luc Besson.

== Personal life ==
Shanna Besson was born 3 January 1993 when her mother was 16 years old and her father, Luc Besson, was 33; her parents had married the previous year. The family lived in Los Angeles during her early years. Her father was working as a director in Hollywood.

In 1995, during the filming of The Fifth Element, her father left her mother for young actress Milla Jovovich, who was appearing in it. As a result, her mother Maïwenn returned to Paris, taking Shanna with her. Jovovich and Luc Besson married, but divorced two years later.

Shanna's maternal aunt is French actress Isild Le Besco. She has a younger half-brother Diego Le Fur, child of her mother's relationship with Jean-Yves Le Fur.

Through her father, Shanna has four siblings, including an older half-sister, Juliette, from his first marriage to actress Anne Parillaud. Her three younger half-siblings are children of his fourth and last marriage, to producer Virginie Silla. She is of French, Algerian and Vietnamese descent through her mother.

== Career ==
When she was 10 years old, Besson made her acting debut in her mother's directorial debut, the short film entitled I'm an Actress. In the semi-autobiographical work, she played a girl forced to be a child star by her mother. The film was based on Maïwenn's own experiences of being pressured into acting by her mother.

Besson later began a career behind the scenes in film. She directed a behind the scenes "making-of" featurette on her father's film The Lady (2011).

She later began work as a still photographer, working for each of her parents: Taken 2 was produced by her father and Mon roi was directed by her mother.
