= Trop de bonheur =

- Directed by: Cédric Kahn
- Written by: Cédric Kahn; Ismaël Ferroukhi
- Produced by: Georges Benayoun; Paul Rosenberg
- Starring: Malek Bechar; Naguime Bendidi; Didier Borga
- Cinematography: Antoine Roch
- Edited by: Yann Dedet; Nathalie Hubert
- Music by: Yarol Poupaud
- Production company: IMA Productions
- Distributed by: Ciné Classic
- Release date: 22 June 1994
- Running time: 85 minutes
- Country: France
- Language: French

Trop de bonheur (English: Too Much Happiness) is a 1994 French comedy drama film directed by Cédric Kahn, who co-wrote the screenplay with Ismaël Ferroukhi.

The film won the Cannes Film Festival's Youth Award, the Prix Jean Vigo, and Special Mention at the Torino International Festival of Young Cinema.

== Cast ==
- Malek Bechar as Kamel
- Naguime Bendidi
- Didier Borga as Didier
- Salah Bouchouareb
- Caroline Ducey as Mathilde
- Emmanuel Gautier
- Laetitia Palermo as Solange
- Estelle Perron as Valerie
