= Julia Roy =

French-Austrian actress, model and screenwriter

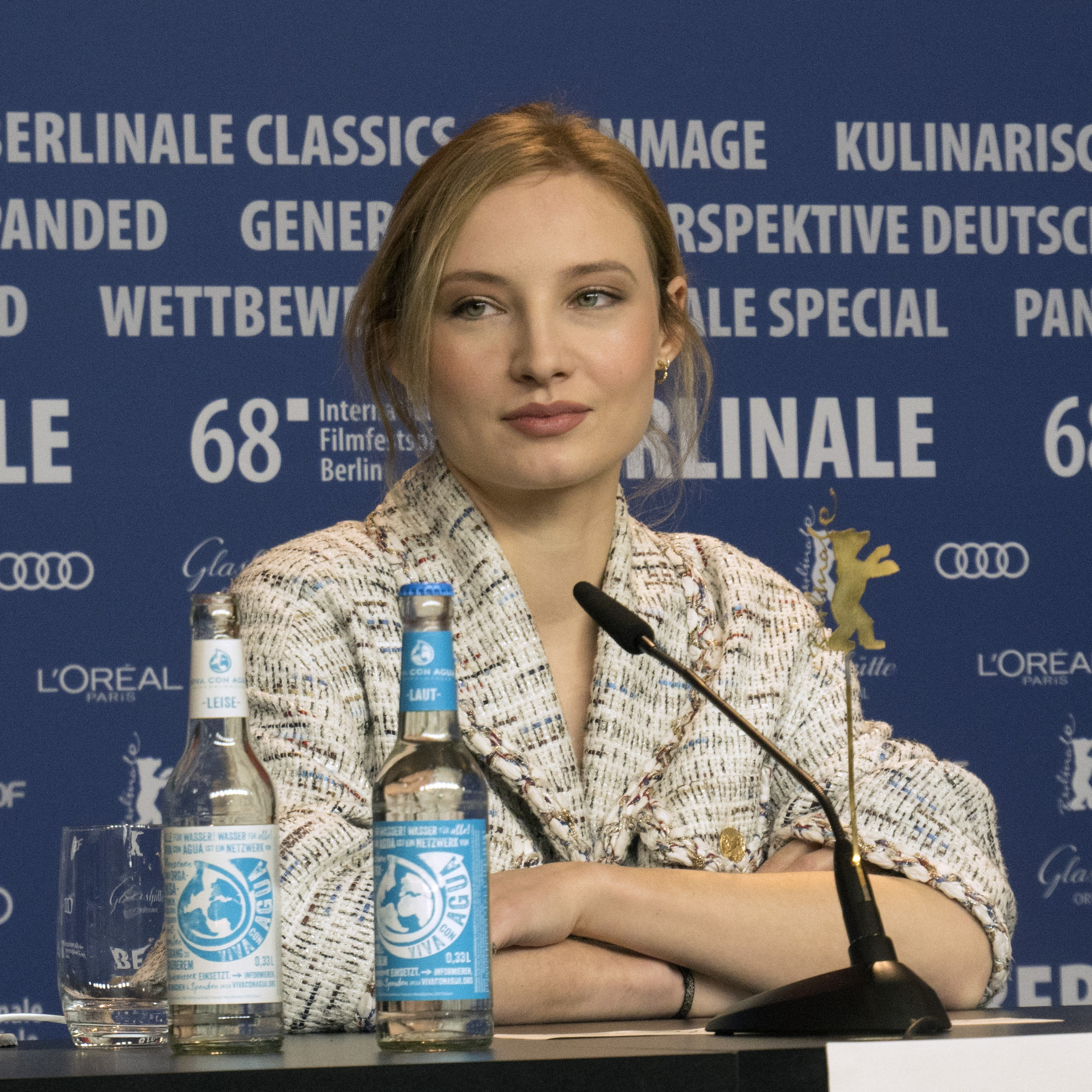
- Roy at the 68th Berlin International Film Festival in 2018
- Born: Paris, France
- Education: Columbia University
- Occupations: Actress, model, screenwriter

Julia Roy is a French actress, model and screenwriter.

== Biography ==
Julia Roy was born in Paris, France. She grew up in Vienna, Austria. After graduating from the Lycée Français de Vienne, she attended the Cours Florent and the Royal Central School of Speech and Drama.

She has appeared in films such as If You Don't, I Will and Eva, in which she starred opposite Isabelle Huppert and Gaspard Ulliel. She starred opposite Mathieu Amalric in Benoît Jacquot's 2016 film Never Ever, for which she also wrote the screenplay based on Don DeLillo's novel The Body Artist. The film premiered at the 73rd Venice International Film Festival and was also shown at the Toronto International Film Festival.

Roy served as one of the jury members at the Cabourg Film Festival in 2016. In 2019, she played with Vincent Lindon in Dernier Amour, and in 2021 she played alongside Charlotte Gainsbourg in the film Suzanna Andler, based on Marguerite Duras's play.

She was nominated in the category Révélations alongside Lily-Rose Depp at the prestigious French César Awards.

In 2017, Roy joined VIVA Model Management and went on to become a brand ambassador for Chanel.

Roy's work has been featured in ELLE, Los Angeles Times, Vanity Fair, Glamour, Die Zeit, Marie Claire, Harper's Bazaar, Variety, Grazia, Die Welt, Madame Figaro, Crash magazine, and Hollywood Reporter.

== Filmography ==
=== Feature films ===
- If You Don't, I Will (2014)
- Never Ever (2016)
- Kafka's Lovers (2017)
- Eva (2018)
- Dernier Amour (2019)
- Stroke of Luck (2020)
- Suzanna Andler (2021)

=== Short films ===
- Telencephale (2012)
- Les Filles de L'Hiver (2013)
- Les Revelations (2017)
- Einstein's Telescope (2021)

== Awards and nominations ==
César Awards 2017: finalist for Best Newcomer Actress.
