= Ramzi Ben Sliman =

French film director (born 1982)

- Born: 1982 (age 43–44); Paris, France
- Education: École Normale Supérieure
- Occupations: Film director; screenwriter
- Years active: 2007–present

Ramzi Ben Sliman (born 1982) is a French film director and screenwriter.

== Biography ==
He studied econometrics in the master's program at the École Normale Supérieure as well as at École centrale Paris (Master 2 in economic-environmental modeling), and briefly taught mathematics at the university level before leaving to work in theatre. He adapted and directed Albert Camus's novel The Stranger (L'Étranger) at the Théâtre 14.

His first feature film, Ma révolution, had its world premiere at the 66th Berlinale in 2016. In 2023, he released a second feature film produced by Gaumont: Neneh Superstar.

His filmography could be summarized by this question and answer: "What do we do with our uniqueness?" asks Ramzi Ben Sliman. "We assert it, because today we can!" the director immediately asserts.

== Filmography ==
- 2007: Mon homme (short)
- 2010: En France (short)
- 2016: My Revolution
- 2019: Grand hôtel Barbès (short)
- 2022: Neneh Superstar
- 2023: Le Jeune Imam (only screenwriter)

== Awards and nominations ==
Award	Year	Category	Nominated work	Result	Ref(s)
Berlin International Film Festival	2016	Generation 14plus - Crystal Bear for Best Feature Film	My Revolution	Nominated	
International Festival of Independent Cinema Off Camera	2016	Best Feature Film	My Revolution	Nominated	
Festival du Film de Demain	2022	Best Feature Film	Neneh Superstar	Nominated	
Mon Premier Festival	2022	Jury Prize - Best Film	Neneh Superstar	Won	
