= Michel Marie =

Seychelles politician

- Occupation: Politician
- Title: member of the National Assembly of Seychelles

Michel Marie is a Seychelles politician. He is a member of the National Assembly of Seychelles. He is a member of the Seychelles People's Progressive Front, and was first elected to the Assembly in 2007.
