= Cheyenne Carron =

French film director, screenwriter, and producer

- Born: Cheyenne Carron; 22 May 1976; Valence, France
- Occupation: Film director
- Years active: since 2001

Cheyenne Carron (born 22 May 1976), is a French film director, screenwriter, and producer.

She is famous for her movies The Apostle realeased in 2014 and the biographical movie about Jacques Hamel intitled A Life for the Others (2024). Her movie to The Beauty of the World was proposed to Oscar Fan Favorite in 2021.

== Biography ==
Born on 22 May 1976, she was abandoned at the age of three months. She chose her first name in reference to her little foster brother, a Guatemalan Indian. Her foster family has adopted three children in addition to two natural children.

== Filmography ==
- 2001: A une Madone
- 2005: Ecorchés
- 2009: Extase
- 2011: Ne nous soumets pas à la tentation
- 2013: The Public Daughter (La Fille Publique)
- 2014: The Apostle (L'Apôtre) - César French Academy proposal
- 2015: Homelands (Patries)
- 2016: The Men Fall(La Chute des Hommes)
- 2017: La Morsure des Dieux
- 2018: Legio Patria Nostra (Jeunesse aux cœurs ardents)
- 2019: Animal Spirit (Le Corps Sauvage)
- 2020: The King Son (Le Fils d'un Roi)
- 2020: The Sun will Rise (Le Soleil Reviendra)
- 2021: The Beauty of the World (La Beauté du Monde) - Oscar Fan Favorite proposal
- 2023: Priest (Je m'abandonne à toi)
- 2024: A Life for the others (Que notre joie demeure)
- 2025: Priest 2 (L'Agneau)
- 2026 : The Paradise (L'Eden)
- 2026 : Once upon a time in Spring (Il était une fois le printemps)
- 2027 : Dear Love (Isaure, mon amour)
