= Isild Le Besco =

French actress and filmmaker (born 1982)

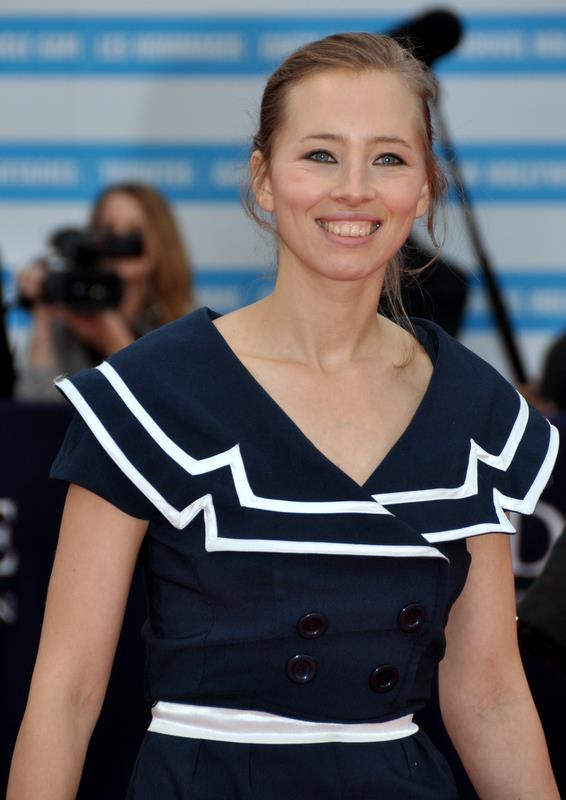
- Le Besco in 2012
- Born: 22 November 1982 (age 43); Paris, France
- Occupations: Actress, film director, screenwriter, producer, film editor
- Years active: 1990–present
- Mother: Catherine Belkhodja
- Relatives: Maïwenn (sister); Jowan Le Besco (brother); Kolia Litscher (brother); Shanna Besson (niece)
- Website: isildlebesco.com

Isild Le Besco (born 22 November 1982) is a French actress and filmmaker. She has written, directed, and appeared in several films, and her honours include the Étoile d'or de la révélation féminine and the Marcello Mastroianni Award at the Venice Film Festival.

== Early life ==
Le Besco was born in Paris to actress and journalist Catherine Belkhodja. On her mother's side, she is of French and Algerian descent, while on her father's side she is of Vietnamese and Breton descent. She is the third of five children, all of whom work in theatre and film.

== Career ==
Le Besco began acting at the age of eight, appearing in Lacenaire (1990), directed by Francis Girod, and La Puce (1996), directed by Emmanuelle Bercot. She later appeared in several French and international films, including Sade (2000), opposite Daniel Auteuil, and The Good Heart (2009), directed by Dagur Kári. In addition to acting, Le Besco has written and directed several films, beginning with Demi-tarif (2004).

== Sex abuse cases ==
She accused Benoît Jacquot of raping her during their relationship, which began when she was underage, and filed a criminal complaint by July 2024. Jacquot was placed under preliminary investigation and criminally charged with the rape of a minor on 4 July 2024. The Paris prosecutor's office announced that a partner of Le Besco was charged with raping her over a 10-month span in 2007. Jacquot was designated as a special witness in this separate case. Le Besco also alleged Jacques Doillon made advances during work sessions and tried to sexually blackmail her in 2000, when she hoped to star in his film Carrément à l'Ouest.

== Filmography ==
=== Feature films ===
- 1990: Lacenaire by Francis Girod
- 1996: La Puce by Emmanuelle Bercot
- 1999: Girls Can't Swim by Anne-Sophie Birot
- 2000: Adieu Babylone by Raphaël Frydman
- 2000: Sade by Benoît Jacquot
- 2001: Roberto Succo by Cédric Kahn
- 2002: A Moment of Happiness by Antoine Santana
- 2002: The Repentant by Laetitia Masson
- 2002: Adolphe by Benoît Jacquot
- 2003: Le Cout de la vie by Philippe Le Guay
- 2004: A tout de suite by Benoît Jacquot
- 2004: Princesse Marie by Benoît Jacquot
- 2005: Backstage by Emmanuelle Bercot
- 2005: La Ravisseuse by Antoine Santana
- 2006: Wild Camp (Camping sauvage) by Christophe Ali and Nicolas Bonilauri
- 2006: The Untouchable by Benoît Jacquot
- 2006: U (voix de la princesse) by Serge Elissalde and Grégoire Solotareff
- 2007: Pas douce by Jeanne Waltz
- 2008: Enfances
- 2009: Je Te Mangerais by Sophie Laloy
- 2009: The Good Heart
- 2010: Deep in the Woods
- 2014: Manhattan Romance
- 2014: Les brigands
- 2014: Portrait of the Artist
- 2014: The New Girlfriend
- 2015: Mon roi

=== Short films ===
- 1999: Cinematon #995 by Gérard Courant
- 1991: Place des Vosges by Catherine Belkhodja
- 1997: Anniversaires by Rosette
- 1997: Kub Valium by Marine Ledu
- 1997: Les Vacances by Emmanuelle Bercot
- 1997: Coquillettes by Joséphine Flasseur
- 1998: Les amis de Ninon by Rosette
- 2000: Des Anges by Julien Leloup
- 2003: Quelqu'un vous aime by Emmanuelle Bercot
- 2003: Dans la foret noire by Joséphine Flasseur
- 2016: Cinématon #2944 by Gérard Courant

=== Television ===
- 1987: Reflets perdus du miroir by Catherine Belkhodja
- 1999: Une Fille rebelle
- 1999: Le Choix d’Élodie by Emmanuelle Bercot
- 2003: La Maison du canal
- 2003: Les Mythes urbains

=== Screenwriter ===
- 1998: Demi-tarif
- 2004: Charly
- 2010: Bas-fonds

=== Director ===
- 2004: Demi-tarif
- 2007: Enfances co-réalisé par Safy Nebbou, Isild Le Besco, Joana Hadjithomas and Khalil Joreige, Corinne Garfin, Ismaël Ferroukhi et Yann Le Gal
- 2007: Charly
- 2010: Bas-fonds
- 2014: Ponts de Sarajevo (Documentary)

== Theater ==
- 2007: La Double Inconstance by Marivaux au Théâtre National de Chaillot, mise en scene by Christian Colin with Grégoire Colin

== Other media ==
- "Marais," narrator—an audio walking tour of the Paris neighborhood, created by Soundwalk

== Awards ==
- 2000: Prix du meilleur scénario Junior au festival de Paris pour son premier scénario: Demi-tarif
- 2001: Étoile d'or de la révélation féminine for Sade, by Benoît Jacquot.
- 2001: Nomination, 7 d'or pour Le Choix d'Elodie
- 2001: Nomination, César Award du Meilleur espoir féminin pour Sade
- 2001: Lumière Award for Most Promising Actress for Sade
- 2002: Nomination, César du Meilleur espoir féminin pour Roberto Succo
- 2004: Prix spécial du Jury a l'European first film festival d’Angers pour Demi-tarif
- 2004: Prix Procirep. Premiers plans. Angers pour Demi-tarif
- 2004: Special prize of Jury du festival de Séoul pour Demi-tarif
- 2005: Grand Prix du Jury. Crossing Europe Festival. Linz pour Demi-tarif
- 2004: Nomination pour le prix Louis Deluc pour Demi-tarif
- 2006: Marcello Mastroianni Award at Venice Film Festival (Best New Actress)
