= Claire Devers =

French film director and screenwriter (born 1955)

- Born: 20 August 1955 (age 70); Paris, France
- Occupations: Film director, screenwriter

Claire Devers (born 20 August 1955, in Paris) is a French film director and screenwriter. She was nominated for the 1987 César Award for Best Debut for directing Noir et Blanc (1986).

== Filmography ==
- Noir et Blanc (1986)
- Chimère (1989)
- Max et Jérémie (1992)
- Les Marins perdus (2003)
