= Romain Winding =

French cinematographer (1951–2023)

- Born: 25 December 1951; Boulogne-Billancourt, France
- Died: 20 July 2023 (aged 71); Ardèche, France
- Occupation: Cinematographer
- Years active: 1976–2015
- Parent: Andréas Winding

Romain Winding (25 December 1951 – 20 July 2023) was a French cinematographer.

Winding died at his home in Ardèche, France, on 20 July 2023, at the age of 71.

== Selected filmography ==
Year	Title	Notes
1987	Yagmur kaçaklari	
1988	Sound and Fury	
1989	Noce blanche	
1990	La Discrète	
1992	Céline	
1994	L'Ange noir	
1998	Sweet Revenge	
1998	The Misadventures of Margaret	
1999	No Scandal	
1999	Belle maman	
2000	False Servant	
2001	A Moment of Happiness	
2004	Le Cou de la girafe	
2008	Clara Sheller	TV series
2010	The Counterfeiters	
2011	When Pigs Have Wings	
2012	Farewell, My Queen	César Award for Best Cinematography
2012	Looking for Hortense	
2013	Joséphine	
2014	Supercondriaque	
2014	La Famille Bélier	
2015	Diary of a Chambermaid	
