= Right Now (film) =

- Film poster
- Directed by: Benoît Jacquot
- Written by: Benoît Jacquot
- Based on: J'avais dix-huit ans by Élisabeth Fanger
- Produced by: Georges Benayoun
- Starring: Isild Le Besco
- Cinematography: Caroline Champetier
- Edited by: Luc Barnier
- Distributed by: GNCR
- Release date: 8 December 2004
- Running time: 95 minutes
- Country: France
- Language: French

Right Now (French: À tout de suite) is a 2004 French film by director Benoît Jacquot. It was screened in the Un Certain Regard section at the 2004 Cannes Film Festival.

== Plot ==
In 1975, a young bourgeois woman falls in love with a bank robber. She follows him and his partner on the run after a bank heist resulted in a death and hostage taking. Using fake IDs, they leave Paris and travel to Spain, Morocco, and Greece.

== Cast ==
- Isild Le Besco as Lili
- Ouassini Embarek as Bada
- Nicolas Duvauchelle as Alain
- Laurence Cordier as Joelle
- Odile Vuillemin
- Emmanuelle Bercot as Laurence

== Reception ==
On review aggregator website Rotten Tomatoes, the film holds an approval rating of 70%, based on 44 reviews, and an average rating of 6.6/10. The website's critical consensus reads, "A mesmerizing performance by ingenue Isild Le Besco makes this stylish French drama a taut, compelling escapade." On Metacritic, the film has a weighted average score of 63 out of 100, based on 19 critics, indicating "generally favorable reviews".
