= Maïwenn =

French actress and filmmaker (born 1976)

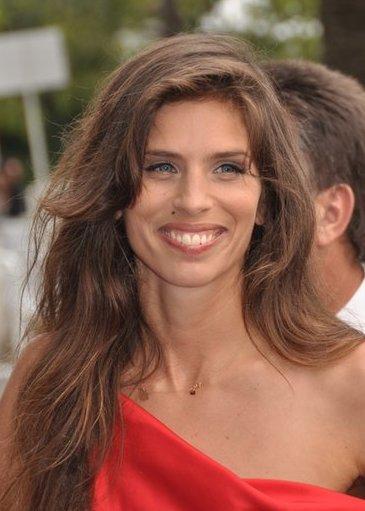
- Maïwenn in 2011
- Born: Maïwenn Le Besco; 17 April 1976 (age 50); Les Lilas, France
- Other name: Ouin-Ouin
- Citizenship: France; Algeria
- Occupations: Actress; writer; director
- Years active: 1981–present
- Spouses: Luc Besson (m. 1992; div. 1997) Jean-Yves Le Fur (m. 2002; div. 2004)
- Children: 2; including Shanna Besson
- Parent: Catherine Belkhodja (mother)
- Relatives: Jowan Le Besco (brother); Isild Le Besco (sister); Kolia Litscher (brother)

Maïwenn Le Besco (French: [majwɛn lə bɛsko]; born 17 April 1976), known mononymously as Maïwenn, is a French actress and filmmaker.

== Early life ==
Maïwenn Le Besco was born on 17 April 1976 in Les Lilas, Seine-Saint-Denis, the daughter of artist Catherine Belkhodja and linguist Patrick Le Besco. After her parents' divorce, she reported "she was abused by both her parents after their separation, having been beaten physically and verbally by her father around the age of seven or eight, and then by her mother during her adolescence"; this experience informed her films Pardonnez-moi (2006) and Polisse (2011). She stated that her mother "is a poison for me. She poisoned my life."

She is of mixed Breton, Vietnamese, French and Algerian descent. Her Algerian ancestry comes from her maternal grandfather, while her father is of mixed French and Vietnamese descent. She is also a citizen of Algeria. In an interview with La Nouvelle République, she explained that she acquired Algerian nationality to honor her grandparents, in connection with her parents' desire to make her forget her origins. Maïwenn's mother pressured her to act at a young age, an experience later chronicled by Maïwenn in her one-woman show Le Pois Chiche (The Chickpea) and her short film I'm an Actress.

Maïwenn is the older sister of actress Isild Le Besco. In 2024, they were reported to be estranged.

== Career ==
Maïwenn starred in several films as a child, then teen, actress—notably as "Elle, as a child" (the child version of the lead role played by Isabelle Adjani) in the 1983 hit film L'été meurtrier (One Deadly Summer).

Following her marriage to director Luc Besson and the birth of their daughter in 1993, Maïwenn interrupted her career for several years. During this period, she only appeared in a supporting part in Besson's Léon (1994), in which she was credited as Ouin-Ouin. She also directed the film's making-of. Perhaps Maïwenn's most internationally seen film role was her appearance as the alien Diva Plavalaguna in Besson's The Fifth Element (1997).

After she and Besson divorced, Maïwenn returned to France. She performed as a stand-up comedian in an autobiographical one-woman-show, and reentered the movie business after several filmmakers saw her comedy routine in Paris. She appeared in several notable movies, including the horror film Haute Tension (English title: High Tension), in which she starred opposite Cécile de France. By the time the film came out in 2003, she had decided she wanted to try directing. She said while acting in Les parisiens (2004) she was inspired by the director Claude Lelouch's approach to film making to make her first film. She explained, "I saw a totally free man, capable of adapting to accidents on the set. ...there are two types of directors: those who love life and use it for their films, and those who don’t love it and try to twist it to make it fit into their films. From that day on, I had chosen my side – the side of freedom, that of Lelouch."

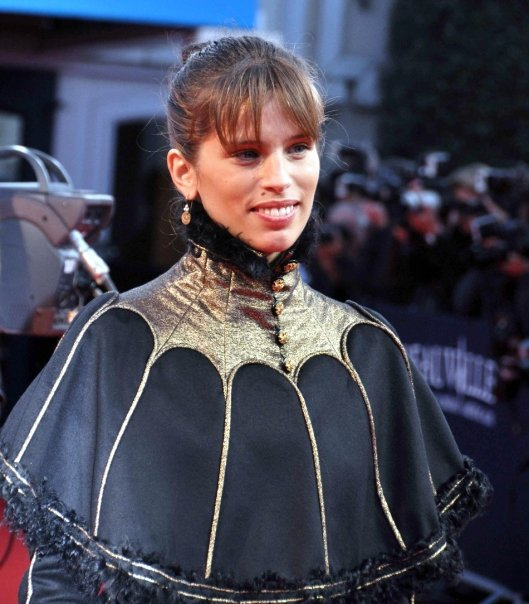
Maïwenn in 2009 at the Deauville American Film Festival.

In 2006, Maïwenn wrote and directed her first feature film, Pardonnez-moi, a drama about a dysfunctional family. She also starred in the film which earned her nominations for the César Award for Best First Feature Film and César Award for Most Promising Actress in the 2007. According to Maïwenn, Besson told her she was "crazy" and needed to stop immediately when he learned she wanted to produce the film with her own money but he apologized after seeing the film, saying she was right this time. Whereas Lelouch had told her, "I think you should go for it. Cinema should be a question of life or death." Her second film was Le bal des actrices (2009, All About Actresses), in which she appears as herself making a documentary. She achieved international recognition when her third film, the social drama Polisse (2011), won the Jury Prize at the 2011 Cannes Film Festival. All three films feature Maïwenn with a camera, stemming from a childhood fascination and her interest in the mise en abyme, the story within a story.

Maïwenn's 2015 film Mon roi was selected to compete for the Palme d'Or at the 2015 Cannes Film Festival. She co-wrote, directed, and starred in the 2020 film, DNA, an Official Selection of the 2020 Cannes Film Festival which was cancelled due to COVID-19 pandemic. She co-wrote, directed, and starred in her first period film, the 2023 film Jeanne du Barry about the life of Madame du Barry with Louis XV portrayed by Johnny Depp, which opened the 2023 Cannes Film Festival out of competition and earned the highest French gross for a Cannes opening film since 2013.

== Personal life ==
Maïwenn met film director Luc Besson when she was 15 and he was 33. In January 1993, at age 16, she gave birth to their daughter Shanna. On the DVD extras for the 1994 film Léon: The Professional, Maïwenn said the film is based on her relationship with Besson. She was 20 at the beginning of filming (early 1996) for The Fifth Element, during which Besson left her for the film's star, Milla Jovovich. Maïwenn stated that she had never regretted her relationship with Luc Besson.

Maïwenn was married between 2002 and 2004 to Jean-Yves Le Fur, a magazine publisher and businessman who mainly made a career in fashion and television production. They had a son named Diego in July 2003, who later made his film debut as the young Louis XVI in Jeanne du Barry directed by Maïwenn. Maïwenn's relationship with Le Fur reportedly resumed in the summer of 2022. She announced his death in April 2024: "Jean-Yves Le Fur, the love of my life, the father of my son Diego and the stepfather of my daughter Shanna, left on Sunday morning in my arms and those of our son...We are all devastated."

In 2023, Maïwenn was accused of assaulting the journalist Edwy Plenel, who alleged she approached him in a Parisian restaurant and grabbed him by the hair before spitting in his face.

== Filmography ==
=== As filmmaker ===
Year	English title	Original title	Notes
2006	Forgive Me	Pardonnez-moi	Also producer
2009	All About Actresses	Le Bal des actrices	
2011	Polisse		Cannes Film Festival - Jury Prize; Lumière Award for Best Director; Cinemania Film Festival - Audience Award; Sarasota Film Festival - Best in World Cinema
2015	My King	Mon Roi	
2020	DNA	ADN	Lumière Award for Best Director
2023	Jeanne du Barry		Also producer

=== As actress ===
Year	Title	Role	Director	Notes
1981	L'année prochaine... si tout va bien	Prune	Jean-Loup Hubert	
1983	One Deadly Summer	The Kid	Jean Becker	
1986	State of Grace		Jacques Rouffio	
1988	L'autre nuit	Joan	Jean-Pierre Limosin	
1990	Lacenaire	Hermine	Francis Girod	
1992	La gamine	Carole Lambert	Hervé Palud	
1994	Léon: The Professional	Blond Babe	Luc Besson	
1997	The Fifth Element	Diva Plavalaguna	Luc Besson	
1998	Keskidi?	The Waitress	Manuel Pouet	Short
1998	Coquillettes		Joséphine Flasseur	Short
2000	La mécanique des femmes		Jérôme de Missolz	
2000	Le marquis		Gilles Paquet-Brenner	Short
2001	8 rue Charlot		Bruno Garcia	Short
2003	Osmose	A Girl	Raphaël Fejtö	
2003	High Tension	Alexia	Alexandre Aja	
2004	Les parisiens	Shaa	Claude Lelouch	
2004	I'm an actrice	Isabelle	Herself	Short
2005	Le courage d'aimer	Shaa	Claude Lelouch	
2005	Star Stuff		Grégory Hervelin	Short
2006	Pardonnez-moi	Violette	Herself	Nominated - César Award for Most Promising Actress
2009	All About Actresses	Maïwenn	Herself	Nominated - Globes de Cristal Award for Best Actress
2011	Polisse	Melissa	Herself	
2012	Télé gaucho	Yasmina	Michel Leclerc	
2013	Love Is the Perfect Crime	Anna	Arnaud Larrieu & Jean-Marie Larrieu	
2017	The Price of Success	Linda	Teddy Lussi-Modeste	
2019	All Inclusive	Paloma	Fabien Onteniente	
2020	Soeurs		Yamina Benguigui	
2020	DNA	Neige	Herself	
2020	The Man In The Hat	The Biker	John-Paul Davidson and Stephen Warbeck	
2021	Tralala	Barbara	Arnaud Larrieu and Jean-Marie Larrieu	
2022	Our Ties	Emma	Roschdy Zem	
2022	Neneh Superstar	Marianne Belage	Ramzi Ben Sliman	
2023	Jeanne du Barry	Jeanne Du Barry	Herself	

=== Television ===
Year	Title	Role	Notes
1983	Cinéma 16	Patrick Saglio	Episode: "Le bois-Corner"
1983	Les enquêtes du commissaire Maigret	Colette	Episode: "Un Noël de Maigret"
1987	Double face	The Kid	TV movie
1990	La famille Ramdam		TV movie
2001	L'oiseau rare	Diane	TV movie
2002	Nestor Burma	Jade	Episode: "Concurrences déloyales"
2002	Caméra Café	Irina Katostefia	Episode: "La Fiancée qui venait du froid"

=== Short film ===
Year	Title	Role	Notes
2004	I'm an actrice	Director & Writer	Short

=== Theatrical writer ===
- 2003: Café de la Gare: Le pois chiche
