= Teri Shields =

American actress, mother, and manager (1933–2012)

- Teri Shields with daughter Brooke in 1981
- Born: Theresia Anna Lilian Maria Schmon; August 1, 1933; Newark, New Jersey, U.S.
- Died: October 31, 2012 (aged 79); New York City, U.S.
- Occupations: Actress, entertainment manager
- Years active: 1964–1990s
- Spouse: Francis Alexander Shields (m. 1964; div. 1966)
- Children: Brooke Shields

Theresia Anna Lilian Maria Shields (née Schmon; August 11, 1933 – October 31, 2012) was an American actress, who was the mother and manager of actress Brooke Shields.

== Life and career ==
Shields was born August 11, 1933 in Newark, New Jersey, and raised there. She was the daughter of Theresa (née Dollinger), a house cleaner, and John Schmon, a chemist. She was of German, English, Scots-Irish, French-Canadian and Welsh ancestry. In 1964, she married Francis Alexander Shields. Several months later, they filed for divorce. The couple's only child, Brooke (b. 1965), became a well-known model and actress.

When Brooke was a child, they lived in a townhouse on the Upper East Side.

She acted alongside her daughter in Wanda Nevada, Endless Love, and Backstreet Dreams.

== Death ==
In 2009, Brooke announced that her mother was suffering from dementia. On October 31, 2012, Shields died at age 79 following a long illness related to dementia.

== Filmography ==
- 1979 – Wanda Nevada, actress
- 1981 – Endless Love, actress
- 1983 – Sahara, producer
- 1990 – Backstreet Dreams, actress
