= Claude-Eric Poiroux =

- Born: 1947-03-02; Saint-Julien-des-Landes
- Occupations: Producer, art director

Claude-Eric Poiroux is a French producer, art manager, festival curator, founder of the Angers European First Film Festival film festival and the General Director of the Europa Cinemas theatre network.

== Childhood ==
Poiroux was born to a family of farmers. As he recalls, he had seen the first movie only at the age of 11. His family was far from the world of art and Poiroux discovered cinema it through his French teacher, a cinephile.

== Career ==
Poiroux is called a key figure in European cinema. Through the years, he worked as a film-club animator, cinema lecturer, producer and distributor, etc. He founded and managed the movie theater Les 400 Coups in Angers. In 2005, with Jeanne Moreau he established Les Ateliers d’Angers, an annual festival of workshops and event aimed to further train and educate young filmmakers.

Poiroux has been the General Director of the Europa Cinemas theatre network since its foundation in 1992. The network was created to provide operational and financial support to cinemas, it collaborated with the European Commission Media program and grew into a vast community with active membership. By 2023, it united 1,221 cinemas in 38 countries. In May 2023, he stepped down from his role as general director, succeeded by Fatima Djoumer.

He is a Chevalier of the Légion d’honneur, he was also awarded with the Ordre des Arts et des Lettres and the Ordre des Palmes académiques.
