= The Owl's Legacy =

1989 documentary television series

- L'Héritage de la chouette
- Genre: Documentary
- Created by: Chris Marker
- Country of origin: France
- No. of episodes: 13

Production
- Producers: Thierry Garrel; Chris Marker
- Running time: 26 minutes

Original release
- Network: La Sept
- Release: 12 June – 28 June 1989

The Owl's Legacy (French: L'Héritage de la chouette) is a 1989 French documentary television series created by Chris Marker. Over 13 episodes, each 26 minutes long, it examines the relationship between the modern world and ancient Greece. It consists of discussions with scholars, politicians and cultural figures. The series was filmed in 1987 and 1988 and first shown on La Sept in 1989.

Due to a negative reaction from the Greek financial backer, The Owl's Legacy was blocked from distribution for many years. It was eventually released on home media in 2018. Critics have praised the series as entertaining and stimulating.

== Episodes ==
The 13 episodes are 26 minutes long and were written and directed by Chris Marker. They are built around interviews and discussions with historians, philosophers, politicians and people from the cultural sphere, interspersed with archive footage, film extracts and exterior shots. People who appear throughout the episodes include Jean-Pierre Vernant, Oswyn Murray, Nikos Svoronos, Cornelius Castoriadis, George Steiner, Iannis Xenakis, Michel Serres, Theo Angelopoulos, Angélique Ionatos, Elia Kazan, Vassilis Vassilikos, Michel Jobert and Atsuhiko Yoshida. Each episode title consists of a Greek word followed by a phrase sometimes intended to be provocative.

No.	English title	French title	Original release date
1	"Symposium or Accepted Ideas"	"Symposium ou Les idées reçues"	12 June 1989
The subject of the series is introduced. Ancient Greece has been a touchstone for the modern world but has been interpreted in different ways and raises many questions.
2	"Olympics or Imaginary Greece"	"Olympisme ou La Grèce imaginaire"	June 1989
The episodes looks at how ancient Greece has been used to promote political ideologies. Special attention is given to National Socialist Germany, including the 1936 Summer Olympics and its portrayal in the film Olympia.
3	"Democracy or The City of Dreams"	"Démocratie ou La cité des songes"	June 1989
Athenian democracy is explored and compared to what has been called democracy in modern times. The concepts have great differences but parallels between ancient and modern politics are pointed out.
4	"Nostalgia or The Impossible Return"	"Nostalgie ou Le retour impossible"	June 1989
The nostalgia in the Odyssey is paralleled with experiences among modern Greeks. Subjects discussed include Greek diaspora communities and how contemporary Greeks try to connect to an ancient past.
5	"Amnesia or History on the March"	"Amnésie ou Le sens de l'histoire"	June 1989
The ancient conception of history, exemplified with Herodotus, is compared to modern history. On a theme of remembering and forgetting, Greek history since the War of Independence is discussed alongside clips from the film America, America.
6	"Mathematics or The Empire Counts Back"	"Mathématique ou L'empire des signes"	June 1989
Starting with Pythagoras and Thales, the episode discusses the universality and ahistorical qualities of mathematics. The claim that mathematics is a key to absolute truth is challenged by the changing history of mathematics and how new mathematical findings create more doubt rather than certainty.
7	"Logomachy or The Dialect of the Tribe"	"Logomachie ou Les mots de la tribu"	June 1989
The ancient Greek word logos is a root in many other words and some of them are explored in the episode. Language in general is discussed and there is an analysis of Plato's dialogue Cratylus.
8	"Music or Inner Space"	"Musique ou L'espace de dedans"	June 1989
The episode, which features the composer Iannis Xenakis and the singer Angélique Ionatos prominently, is about the origin and nature of music.
9	"Cosmogony or The Ways of the World"	"Cosmogonie ou L'usage du monde"	June 1989
The episode is about creation on various levels. It features a former power plant that has been turned into a cultural centre in Athens, discusses ancient Greek sculpture and compares Plato's allegory of the cave to cinema.
10	"Mythology or Lies Like Truth"	"Mythologie ou La vérité du mensonge"	June 1989
Greek mythology has had a major impact on modern thinking. A theory about mythology and its relationship to psychology is explored, along with a discussion about differences between a Hellenic worldview and Paul the Apostle's Judaic way of thinking. Parallels are draws between Greek and Japanese myths.
11	"Misogyny or The Snares of Desire"	"Misogynie ou Les pièges du désir"	June 1989
The episode focuses on desire and women in ancient Greece and features the classicist Giulia Sissa prominently. Romantic love, which included pederastic relationships, was separate from marriage, which consisted of a father as leader of the household and a mother as his subject. Desire was both celebrated and viewed as a major destructive force.
12	"Tragedy or The Illusion of Death"	"Tragédie ou L'illusion de la mort"	June 1989
With Greek tragedy as its starting point, the episode explores parallels between Greek and Japanese theatre and cinema.
13	"Philosophy or The Triumph of the Owl"	"Philosophie ou Le triomphe de la chouette"	28 June 1989
The episode starts by exploring the owl as a symbol. It goes on by discussing the definition and relevance of philosophy and whether the ancient Greeks had sacred texts or not.

== Production ==
The initiative to The Owl's Legacy was taken by the producer Thierry Garrel in 1987 and the idea originally came from the screenwriter Jean-Claude Carrière. The series was produced by the then new French television channel La Sept with financial support from the Alexander S. Onassis Foundation in Greece. Filming took place in 1987 and 1988 in France, Greece, the United States, Georgia, Japan and Cape Verde. The format was inspired by the ancient Greek symposium, a banquet that included discussions over wine. Four meetings modelled after the symposium were held, one each in Athens, Paris, Berkeley and Tbilisi.

== Release ==
La Sept broadcast The Owl's Legacy from 12 to 28 June 1989. It was shown on British television in 1991. The series was for many years unavailable because of a segment where Steiner argued that modern Greece has nothing to do with ancient Greece. This caused anger within the Onassis Foundation, which chose to block further distribution and responded that without modern Greece, the series would not have existed. In 2007, it was shown as an art installation in Greece, where all 13 episodes ran simultaneously on different monitors.

The Onassis Foundation eventually handed over The Owl's Legacy to the Cinémathèque Française which performed a restoration. In France, Arte éditions released the restored version on two DVDs on 2 May 2018. The DVDs come with a 100 pages long booklet that includes comments from the Cinémathèque Française's president Costa-Gavras. The release was accompanied by an exhibition about Marker at the Cinémathèque Française. Icarus Films released the series on the American digital distribution platform VHX in 2018.

== Reception ==
When The Owl's Legacy was made available in 2018, Christophe Ono-dit-Biot of Le Point called it formidable and wrote that it offered "an experience of otherness that is as radical as it is essential for thinking about the world in which we want to live". In Le Monde, Mathieu Macheret called the series stimulating and beautiful, and said he appreciated that it assumed its viewers were intelligent and took upon itself to spread knowledge. The same reviewer wrote that the archival material and exterior footage are successful parts of the whole, because they never illustrate what is being said, but add to it. J. Hoberman of The New York Times called the series "at once illuminating and confounding, heady but playful" and said it is entertaining throughout. He said it premiered the same year the Cold War ended and perhaps unintentionally "has the feel of a glorious, collective epitaph" for the 20th century.
