= Ismaël Ferroukhi =

French Moroccan film director

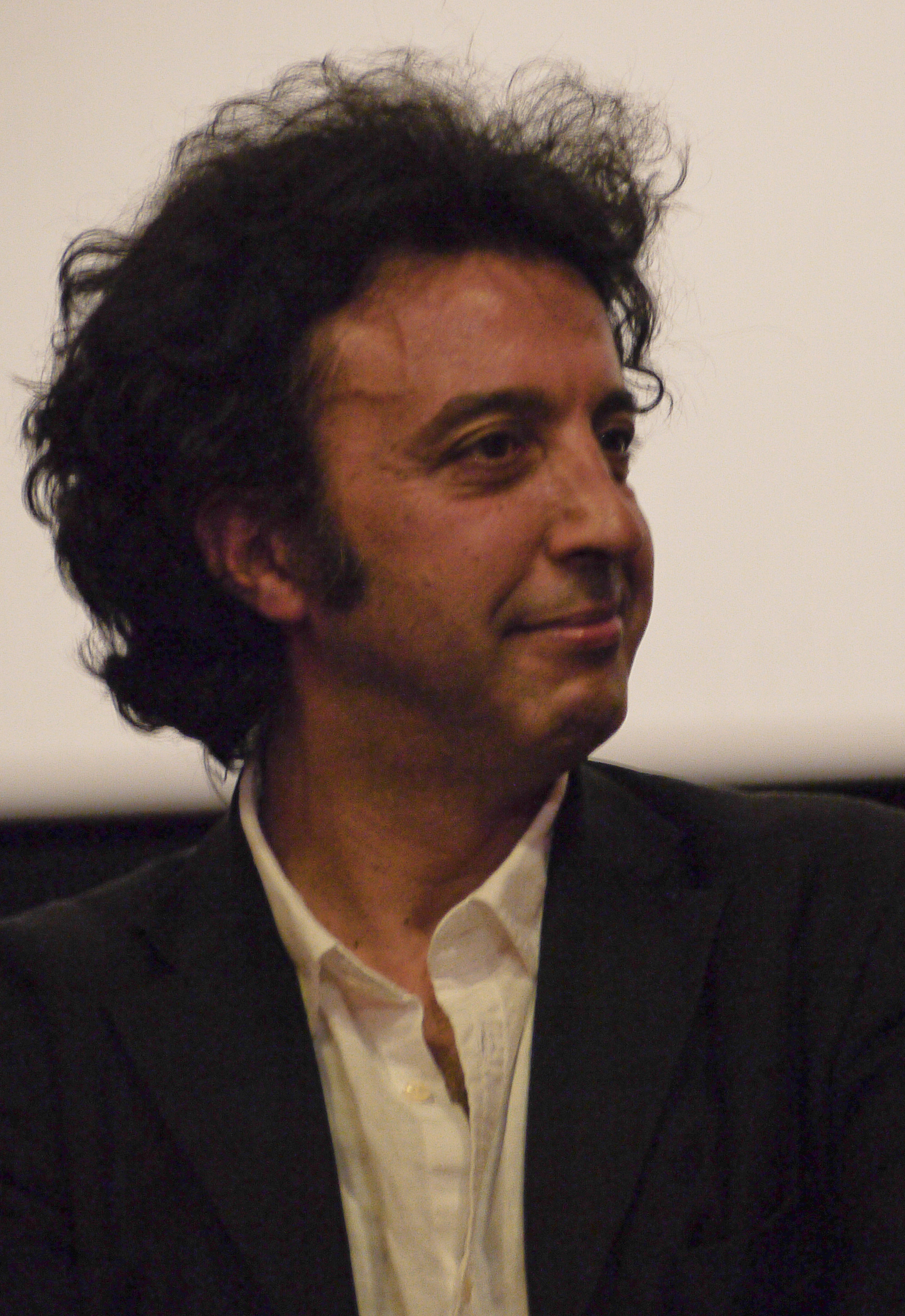
- Ismaël Ferroukhi in 2011
- Born: 26 June 1962 (age 63); Kenitra, Morocco
- Occupations: Film director, screenwriter

Ismaël Ferroukhi (born 26 June 1962) is a French-Moroccan film director and screenwriter.

== Biography ==
Ferroukhi was born in Kenitra. He gained exposure with his 1992 short film L'Exposé, which won the Kodak Prize at the 1993 Cannes Film Festival. Following, Ferroukhi co-wrote the Cédric Kahn film Trop de bonheur (1994).

His directorial debut Le Grand Voyage, produced by Humbert Balsan and Ognon Pictures, won the Lion of the Future "Luigi De Laurentiis" Award for a First Feature Film at the 61st Venice Film Festival in 2004.

== Filmography ==
Year	Title	Director	Screenwriter	Notes
1993	L'Exposé	Yes	Yes	Short film
1994	Trop de bonheur		Yes	
1994	Tous les garçons et les filles de leur âge		Yes	TV series
1996	Culpabilité zéro		Yes	TV film
1996	Court toujours : l'Inconnu	Yes	Yes	TV short
1997	Un été aux hirondelles		Yes	TV film
2000	Petit Ben	Yes	Yes	TV film
2004	Le Grand Voyage	Yes	Yes	
2004	Lahna Lalhih		Yes	Short film
2005	L'Avion		Yes	
2007	Childhoods	Yes		Segment "The Pair of Shoes"
2011	Free Men	Yes	Yes	
2019	Mica	Yes	Yes	

== Awards and nominations ==
- L'Exposé (1993) (Kodak Short Film Award, 1993 Cannes Film Festival)
- Le Grand Voyage (2004) (Nomination: Golden Star, Marrakech International Film Festival)
- Le Grand Voyage (2004) (Luigi De Laurentiis Award, Venice Film Festival)
- Le Grand Voyage (2005) (Best Film, Mar del Plata Film Festival)
- Le Grand Voyage (2006) (Nomination: BAFTA Award for Best Film Not in the English Language)
