= Benoît Jacquot =

French film director and screenwriter (born 1947)

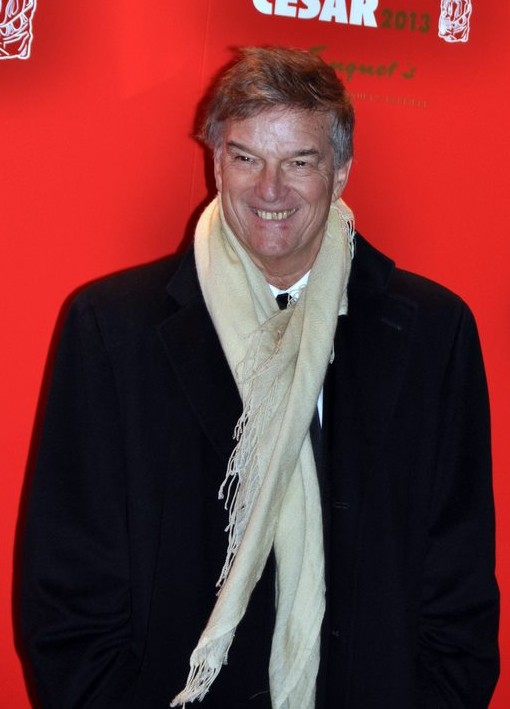
- Jacquot in 2013
- Born: 5 February 1947 (age 79); Paris, France
- Occupations: Film director, screenwriter
- Years active: 1975–2024

Benoît Jacquot (French: [bənwa ʒako]; born 5 February 1947) is a French film director and screenwriter who has had a varied career in European cinema.

In July 2024, Jacquot was charged with rape, including of a minor, and was barred from directing and having contact with minors.

== Life and career ==
Born in Paris, Jacquot began his career as assistant director of Marguerite Duras films, including Nathalie Granger, Woman of Ganges, India Song, and also actor in the 1973 short film La Sœur du cadre.

He turned to writing and directing with the 1975 film The Musician Killer, which starred Anna Karina.

He has directed over forty films, including La Désenchantée (1990), starring Judith Godrèche, and A Single Girl (1995), starring Virginie Ledoyen.

In 2003, he directed Massenet's opera Werther conducted by Antonio Pappano at Royal Opera House, Covent Garden.

His film Farewell, My Queen opened the 62nd Berlin International Film Festival in February 2012. He also received the René Clair Award that year.

His 2014 film Three Hearts competed for the Golden Lion at the 71st Venice International Film Festival.

== Sexual abuse allegations and criminal charges ==
In January 2024, Judith Godrèche accused Jacquot of grooming her when she was 14. Following the accusations made by Godrèche, several actresses came forward with allegations against Jacquot, including Julia Roy, Vahina Giocante and Isild Le Besco. In February 2024, Godrèche filed an official police complaint against Jacquot accusing him of "rapes with violence of a minor less than 15 years old".

On 1 July 2024, he was questioned along with Jacques Doillon over sexual abuse of Godrèche. The two directors would also be taken into custody by the Juvenile Protection Brigade. On 3 July 2024, Jacquot was charged with rape.

Prior to the charge, Jacquot was also placed under formal investigation for claims of raping and sexually assaulting Roy between 1998 and 2000 and Le Besco in 2013. Le Besco filed a complaint over alleged rape during her own relationship with Jacquot that also started when she was underage, while Roy accused Jacquot of sexually assaulting her in a "context of violence and moral constraint which lasted several years." Jacquot would be preliminarily charged with raping Roy and Le Besco. On 4 July 2024, the Paris prosecutor's office confirmed that the rape charges were now made official and also announced that Jacquot was charged with the rape of a minor, Le Besco, and would also be required to serve as a special witness in another case involving alleged rape of Le Besco, in this case by a partner over a 10-month span in 2007. He would be released from prison that day but ordered to undergo psychological treatment and was barred from contacting his alleged victims and witnesses. Jacquot also cannot work either as a director or in any capacity with minors and was ordered to pay bail of 25,000 euros ($27,000). He also remains under judicial supervision.

== Filmography ==
Film

Year	Title	Director	Writer	Notes
1975	The Musician Killer	Yes	Yes	
1977	Closet Children	Yes	Yes	
1979	Return to the Beloved		Yes	
1981	The Wings of the Dove	Yes	Yes	
1986	Corps et Biens	Yes	Yes	
1987	Buisson ardent		Yes	
1988	The Beggars	Yes	Yes	
1988	Le Voyage au bout de la nuit	Yes		Medium-length film (also as cinematographer)
1990	La Désenchantée	Yes	Yes	
1994	3000 scénarios contre un virus	Yes		Omnibus film
1995	A Single Girl	Yes	Yes	
1997	Seventh Heaven	Yes	Yes	
1998	The School of Flesh	Yes		
1999	No Scandal	Yes	Yes	
2000	False Servant	Yes		
2000	Sade	Yes		
2001	Tosca	Yes		
2002	Adolphe	Yes	Yes	
2004	Right Now	Yes	Yes	
2006	The Untouchable	Yes	Yes	
2009	Villa Amalia	Yes	Yes	
2010	Deep in the Woods	Yes	Yes	
2012	Farewell, My Queen	Yes	Yes	
2014	Three Hearts	Yes	Yes	
2015	Diary of a Chambermaid	Yes	Yes	
2016	Never Ever	Yes		
2018	Eva	Yes	Yes	
2019	Casanova, Last Love	Yes	Yes	
2021	Suzanna Andler	Yes	Yes	
2022	Par coeurs	Yes	Yes	

Short film

Year	Title	Director	Writer
2009	Atelier jardin	Yes	Yes
2013	Venice 70: Future Reloaded	Yes	

Documentary film

- Par cœur (1998)
- Gentleman Rissient (2016)

Documentary short

- The Death of the Young English Aviator (1993) (Also editor)
- Écrire (1993)

TV series

Year	Title	Director	Writer	Notes
1993	Cuentos de Borges	Yes	Yes	
1996	Un siècle d'écrivains	Yes	Yes	Documentary series (episode "J. D. Salinger")

TV movies

Year	Title	Director	Writer	Notes
1974	Psychanalyse	Yes	Yes	Documentary film
1982	Une villa aux environs de New York	Yes		
1988	The Beast of the Jungle	Yes		
1988	Elvire Jouvet 40	Yes		
1989	Alfred Deller: portrait d'une voix	Yes		
1990	Dans la solitude des champs de coton	Yes		
1995	La Place Royale	Yes		
1995	La Vie de Marianne	Yes	Yes	
2004	Princesse Marie	Yes		
2007	Gaspard le bandit	Yes		
2010	Werther	Yes		
2010	The Counterfeiters	Yes	Yes	

=== As actor ===
Year	Title	Role	Notes
1973	La Sœur du cadre		Short film
1975	India Song		Voice
1997	Le Théâtre des matières	The writer	
1979	Le Navire Night		Voice
1979	Short Memory	Monsieur Mann's secretary	
2012	Bad Girl	The director	
2012	Looking for Hortense	Kevadian	
2012	Jeanne		Short film
2013	Chinese Puzzle	Monsieur Rousseau	

== Awards and nominations ==
Year	Title	Award/Nomination
1982	Une villa aux environs de New York	Nominated—Cannes Film Festival – Prix Un certain regard
1997	Seventh Heaven	Nominated—Venice Film Festival – Golden Lion
1998	The School of Flesh	Nominated—Cannes Film Festival – Palme d'Or
1999	No Scandal	Nominated—Venice Film Festival – Golden Lion
2004	Right Now	Nominated—Cannes Film Festival – Prix Un certain regard
2006	The Untouchable	Nominated—Venice Film Festival – Golden Lion
2012	Farewell, My Queen	Louis Delluc Prize for Best Film; Nominated—Berlin Film Festival – Golden Bear; Nominated—César Award for Best Film; Nominated—César Award for Best Director; Nominated—César Award for Best Adaptation; Nominated—Globes de Cristal Award for Best Film; Nominated—Lumière Award for Best Film; Nominated—Lumière Award for Best Screenplay
2014	Three Hearts	Nominated—Louis Delluc Prize for Best Film; Nominated—Lumière Award for Best Film; Nominated—Lumière Award for Best Director; Nominated—Venice Film Festival – Golden Lion
2015	Diary of a Chambermaid	Nominated—Berlin Film Festival – Golden Bear; Nominated—César Award for Best Adaptation
