= Emmanuelle Bercot =

French actress (born 1967)

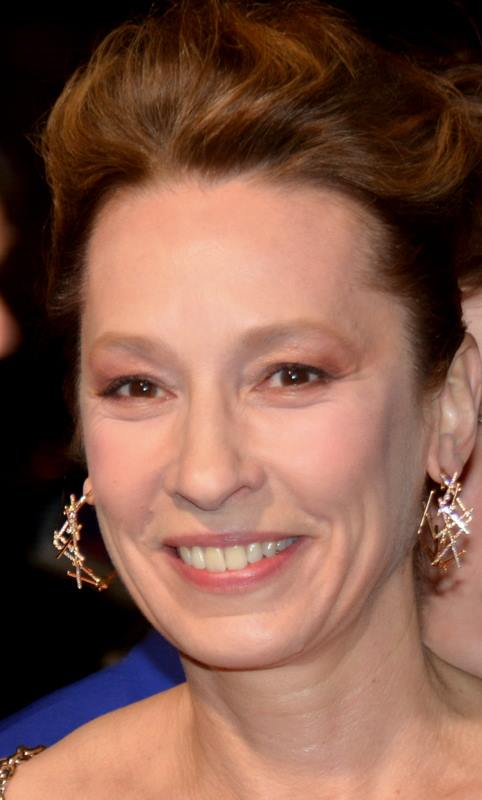
- Bercot at the 2016 César Awards
- Born: 6 November 1967 (age 58); Paris, France
- Occupations: Actress; film director; screenwriter
- Years active: 1991–present
- Partner: Guillaume Schiffman
- Children: Nemo Schiffman

Emmanuelle Bercot (French: [ɛmmanɥɛl bɛʁko]; born 6 November 1967) is a French actress, film director, and screenwriter.

== Early life ==
Bercot was born on 6 November 1967 in Paris.

== Career ==
=== Filmmaking ===
Bercot wrote, directed, and played a lead role in the film Clément, which was screened in the Un Certain Regard section at the 2001 Cannes Film Festival.

Her 2013 film On My Way (Elle s'en va), starring Catherine Deneuve, premiered in competition at the 63rd Berlin International Film Festival.

Her 2015 film Standing Tall (La Tête haute), also with Deneuve, was selected to open the 2015 Cannes Film Festival. Also at Cannes in 2015, Bercot won the award for Best Actress for her role in Mon roi.

In February 2026, Bercot started shooting her eighth feature film as a director, The Enraged, based on the 2023 book of the same name by Sorj Chalandon, starring Marion Cotillard and Benoit Magimel.

=== Acting ===
Bercot plays the French president in the 2024 action thriller series Paris Has Fallen.

== Personal life ==
Bercot has a son, Nemo Schiffman, with her partner Guillaume Schiffman.

== Filmography ==
=== As actress ===
Year	Title	Role	Notes
1991	Ragazzi	Emmanuelle	
1995	Inner City		
1997	La Divine Poursuite		
1998	Class Trip	Miss Grimm	
1999	It All Starts Today	Mrs. Tievaux	
1999	One 4 All	Sam Morvan's wife	
2001	Clément	Marion	Also director and screenwriter
2004	Right Now	Laurence	
2005	Camping sauvage	Florence	
2007	Childhoods	The mother of Orson Welles	Segment: "Le Regard d'un enfant"
2010	Carlos		TV mini-series
2011	Polisse	Sue Ellen	
2012	Rue Mandar	Aline	
2013	Turning Tide	The Doctor	
2015	Mon roi	Tony	Cannes Film Festival for Best Actress; Nominated—César Award for Best Actress; Nominated—Lumière Award for Best Actress
2018	Girls of the Sun		
2018	School's Out	Catherine	
2019	Fête de Famille	Claire	
2020	Jumbo	Margarette	
2020	L'Ennemi	Maître Béatrice Rondas	
2021	The Mad Women's Ball	Jeanne	
2022	Goliath	France	
2022	Grand Expectations	Gabrielle Dervaz	
2023	Abbé Pierre – A Century of Devotion	Lucie Coutaz	
2023	Sentinelle	Florence Cazeaux-Rocher	
2023	Making Of	Viviane	
2024	Paris Has Fallen	Juliette, the French president	

=== Filmmaker ===
Year	Title	Credited as		Notes
Year	Title	Director	Screenwriter	Notes
1997	Les Vacances	Yes	Yes	Short film
1999	La Puce	Yes	Yes	Short film
1999	Le Choix d'Élodie	Yes		Telefilm
2000	Drug Scenes	Yes	Yes	Segment: "La Faute au vent"
2001	Clément	Yes	Yes	
2003	Quelqu'un vous aime...	Yes	Yes	Short film
2004	À poil !	Yes	Yes	Short film
2005	Backstage	Yes	Yes	
2009	Suite noire	Yes	Yes	TV series
2010	Student Services	Yes	Yes	Telefilm
2010	The Big Picture		Yes	
2011	Polisse		Yes	Nominated—César Award for Best Original Screenplay; Nominated—Lumière Award for Best Screenplay
2012	The Players	Yes		Segment: "La Question"
2013	On My Way	Yes	Yes	
2015	Standing Tall	Yes	Yes	Nominated—César Award for Best Film; Nominated—César Award for Best Director; Nominated—César Award for Best Original Screenplay
2016	150 Milligrams	Yes	Yes	Nominated—César Award for Best Adaptation
2021	Peaceful	Yes	Yes	Nominated—Lumière Award for Best Film
TBA	The Enraged	Yes	Yes	

== Decorations ==
- Chevalier of the Legion of Honour (2015)

== See also ==
- List of female film and television directors
