= List of French films of 2001 =

A list of films produced in France in 2001.

== Films ==
Title	Director	Cast	Genre	Notes
15 Août	Patrick Alessandrin	Richard Berry, Charles Berling, Jean-Pierre Darroussin, Mélanie Thierry	Family comedy	
À ma sœur!	Catherine Breillat	Roxane Mesquida	Drama	4 wins & 2 nominations
Absolument fabuleux	Gabriel Aghion	Josiane Balasko, Nathalie Baye, Claude Gensac	Comedy	
A Crime in Paradise	Laurent Heynemann	Jacques Villeret	Comedy	
Adieu Babylone	Raphaël Frydman	Isild Le Besco, Emmanuel Faventines, Raphaël Frydman	Drama	
Aïe	Sophie Fillières			
Amélie	Jean-Pierre Jeunet	Audrey Tautou, Mathieu Kassovitz	Comedy drama	Nominated for 5 Oscars, 48 wins, 37 nominations.
Antilles sur Seine	Pascal Légitimus	Chantal Lauby, Med Hondo	Crime comedy	
Bandits d'amour	Pierre Le Bret	Florence Loiret-Caille, Vincent Ozanon		
Barnie et ses petites contrariétés	Bruno Bauer Chiche	Fabrice Luchini, Nathalie Baye		
Bella Ciao	Stéphane Giusti	Jacques Gamblin, Yael Abecassis	Romantic comedy	
Belphégor, le fantôme du Louvre	Jean-Paul Salomé	Sophie Marceau, Michel Serrault	Fantasy	
Bon Plan	Jérôme Lévy	Ludivine Sagnier, Véronique Balme		
Boyhood Loves	Yves Caumon	Mathieu Amalric	Drama	Screened at the 2001 Cannes Film Festival
Brotherhood of the Wolf	Christophe Gans	Samuel Le Bihan, Vincent Cassel, Monica Bellucci	Historic drama	
Carrément à l'Ouest	Jacques Doillon	Lou Doillon, Caroline Ducey	Comedy drama	
Ceci est mon corps	Rodolphe Marconi	Louis Garrel, Jane Birkin		
Ceux D'en Face	Jean-Daniel Pollet	Michael Lonsdale	Drama	
Chaos	Coline Serreau	Vincent Lindon, Catherine Frot	Drama	
Change-moi Ma Vie	Liria Begeja	Fanny Ardant, Roschdy Zem		
Charmant Garçon	Patrick Chesnais	Patrick Chesnais, Alexandra Vandernoot	Comedy drama	
Clément	Emmanuelle Bercot	Emmanuelle Bercot		Screened at the 2001 Cannes Film Festival
The Closet	Francis Veber	Daniel Auteuil, Gérard Depardieu	Comedy	
Combat D'amour En Songe	Raoul Ruiz		Fantasy drama	
Confession d'un dragueur	Alain Soral	Saïd Taghmaoui, Thomas Dutronc		
Confort Moderne	Dominique Choisy	Nathalie Richard, Valérie Mairesse	Thriller	
Day Off	Pascal Thomas		Comedy drama	
De l'histoire ancienne	Orso Miret	Yann Goven, Olivier Gourmet	Drama	
Electroménager	Sylvain Monod	Éric Elmosnino, Camille Japy		
Enemy at the Gates	Jean-Jacques Annaud	Jude Law, Ed Harris, Rachel Weisz, Joseph Fiennes, Bob Hoskins	War	American-British-French-German-Irish co-production
Faites comme si je n'étais pas là	Olivier Jahan	Sami Bouajila, Alexia Stresi	Drama	
Félix et Lola	Patrice Leconte	Charlotte Gainsbourg, Philippe Torreton	Drama	
Franck Spadone	Richard Bean	Monica Bellucci, Stanislas Merhar	Thriller	
Gamer	Patrick Levy	Saïd Taghmaoui, Camille de Pazzis		
The Girl from Paris	Christian Carion	Michel Serrault	Comedy drama	3 wins & 1 nomination
Grégoire Moulin contre l'humanité	Artus de Penguern	Pascale Arbillot, Elisabeth Vitali	Comedy	
Harrison's Flowers	Élie Chouraqui	Andie MacDowell, Elias Koteas		
How I Killed My Father	Anne Fontaine	Charles Berling, Michel Bouquet	Thriller	
Imago (jours de folie)	Marie Vermillard	Nathalie Richard, Frédéric Pierrot	Comedy drama	
I'm Going Home	Manoel de Oliveira	Michel Piccoli, Catherine Deneuve	Drama	
Intimacy	Pierre Chereau	Mark Rylance, Kerry Fox		Co-produced with UK
In Praise of Love	Jean-Luc Godard	Bruno Putzulu	Drama	Nominated for Palme d'Or at Cannes, +2 wins, +2 nom.
J'ai faim !!!	Florence Quentin	Catherine Jacob, Michele Larogue	Comedy	
J’ai Tué Clémence Acéra	Jean-Luc Gaget	Gérald Laroche, Sacha Bourdo	Comedy drama	
Jeu de Cons	Jean-Michel Verner	Frédéric Diefenthal, Anthony Delon	Comedy	
Just Visiting	Jean-Marie Poiré	Jean-Marie Poiré	Comedy	
Karmen Geï	Joseph Gaï Ramaka	Djeïnaba Diop Gaï, Stephanie Biddle, Magaye Adama Niang	Musical	Adaptation of the opera Carmen, Canadian-French-Senegalese coproduction
L'Anglaise et le Duc	Éric Rohmer	Lucy Russell, Jean-Claude Dreyfus	Historical	
L'Art (délicat) de la séduction	Richard Berry	Patrick Timsit, Cécile de France		
L'Homme des foules	John Lvoff	Jerzy Radziwiłowicz, Maria de Medeiros		
La Boite	Claude Zidi	William Kinganga, Nassim Lazouguen	Comedy	
La Fille de son père	Jacques Deschamps	Natacha Régnier, François Berléand	Thriller	
La Tour Montparnasse Infernale	Charles Némès	Éric Judor	Comedy	
La Vérité si je mens! 2	Thomas Gilou	Richard Anconina, José Garcia		
Le Roman de Lulu	Pierre-Olivier Scotto	Thierry Lhermitte, Claire Keim		
Le Royaume des rapiats	Michel Vignaud	Gael Bordier, Patrick Athenor		
Le Souffle	Damien Odoul	Pierre-Louis Bonnetblanc, Dominique Chevallier	Drama	
Le Vélo de Ghislain Lambert	Philippe Harel	Antoine de Caunes, Sacha Bourdo	Comedy	
Les Aliénés	Yvan Gauthier	Christopher Buchholz, Virginie Aster		
Liberté-Oléron	Bruno Podalydès	Denis Podalydès, Guilane Londez	Comedy	
Ligne 208	Bernard Dumont	Patrick Dell'isola, Pierre Martot		
Les Morsures de l'aube	Antoine de Caunes	Gilbert Melki	Fantasy thriller	
Mademoiselle	Philippe Lioret	Sandrine Bonnaire, Jacques Gamblin	Comedy	Entered into the 23rd Moscow International Film Festival
Mon Père...il m'a sauve la vie	José Giovanni	Bruno Cremer, Rufus		
Mortel Transfert	Jean-Jacques Beineix	Jean-Hugues Anglade, Hélène de Fougerolles	Thriller	Co-produced with Germany
My Wife Is an Actress	Yvan Attal	Yvan Attal, Charlotte Gainsbourg	Comedy drama	1 win & 2 nominations
Mystery Troll	Éric Atlan			
Night Shift	Philippe Le Guay	Gérald Laroche, Marc Barbe		
Of Woman and Magic	Claude Miller	Anne Brochet, Mathilde Seigner	Comedy drama	
The Officers' Ward	François Dupeyron	Éric Caravaca	War drama	2 wins & 7 nominations, entered at Cannes
On appelle ça... le printemps	Herve Leroux	Marilyne Canto, Marise Cupaiolo		
Origine contrôlée	Zakia Bouchaala, Ahmed Bouchaala	Ronit Elkabetz	Comedy drama	
La Pianiste	Michael Haneke	Isabelle Huppert, Annie Girardot	Romance	
Poetical Refugee	Abdellatif Kechiche	Sami Bouajila	Drama	
The Pornographer	Bertrand Bonello	Jean-Pierre Léaud	Drama	1 win & 1 nomination
Pretty Things	Gilles Paquet-Brenner	Marion Cotillard, Stomy Bugsy		
Quand on sera grand	Renaud Cohen	Mathieu Demy, Amira Casar		
Que faisaient les femmes...	Chris Vander Stappen	Tsilla Chelton, Christian Crahay	Comedy drama	
Read My Lips	Jacques Audiard	Vincent Cassel, Emmanuelle Devos	Crime drama	7 wins & 11 nominations
Replay	Catherine Corsini	Emmanuelle Béart, Pascale Bussières	Comedy drama	Entered into the 2001 Cannes Film Festival
Roberto Succo	Cédric Kahn	Stefano Cassetti		Entered into the 2001 Cannes Film Festival
Savage Souls	Raúl Ruiz	Laetitia Casta, Frédéric Diefenthal	Drama	Co-production with Belgium and Switzerland; Screened at the 2001 Cannes Film Festival
Sobibor, 14 Oct. 1943, 4 p.m.	Claude Lanzmann		Documentary	Screened at the 2001 Cannes Film Festival
Tanguy	Étienne Chatiliez	Sabine Azéma, André Dussollier	Comedy drama	2 nominations
Time Out	Laurent Cantet	Aurélien Recoing, Karin Viard	Drama	
Too Much Flesh	Jean-Marc Barr et Pascal Arnold	Élodie Bouchez, Jean-Marc Barr		
Toutes les nuits	Eugène Green	Anna Bielecka, Claude Merlin	Drama	
Trouble Every Day	Claire Denis	Vincent Gallo, Tricia Vessey	Horror / Thriller	2 nominations
Un Aller Simple	Laurent Heynemann	Lorànt Deutsch		
Va savoir	Jacques Rivette	Jeanne Balibar	Comedy drama	Entered into the 2001 Cannes Film Festival
Vidocq	Pitof	Gérard Depardieu	Crime / Fantasy	7 wins & 2 nominations
Voyance et Manigance	Éric Fourniols	Emmanuelle Béart, Serge Hazanavicius	Comedy	
Winged Migration	Jacques Perrin a.o.		Documentary	Nominated for Oscar, +3 wins, +9 nom.
Yamakasi	Ariel Zeitoun		Action / Drama	
Yes, But...	Yves Lavandier	Gérard Jugnot, Émilie Dequenne	Comedy drama	4 wins
