= 27th César Awards =

Awards ceremony

- Date: 2 March 2002
- Site: Théâtre du Châtelet, Paris, France
- Hosted by: Édouard Baer

Highlights
- Best Film: Amélie
- Best Actor: Michel Bouquet
- Best Actress: Emmanuelle Devos
- Most awards: Amélie (4)
- Most nominations: Amélie (13)

Television coverage
- Network: Canal+

The 27th César Awards ceremony, presented by the Académie des Arts et Techniques du Cinéma, honoured the best films of 2001 in France and took place on 2 March 2002 at the Théâtre du Châtelet in Paris. The ceremony was chaired by Nathalie Baye and hosted by Édouard Baer.

Romantic comedy Amélie led all nominees with 13 nominations, followed by The Officers' Ward and Read My Lips with nine nominations each. Amélie went on to win four awards, more than any other film in the ceremony, including Best Film.

== Winners and nominees ==
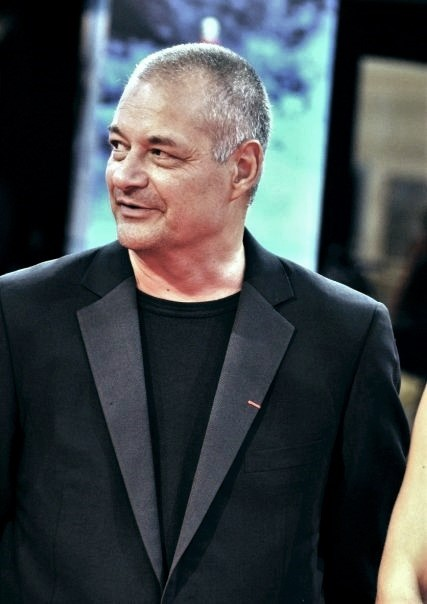
Jean-Pierre Jeunet, Best Director winner

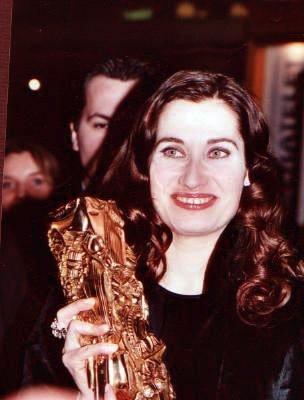
Emmanuelle Devos, Best Actress winner

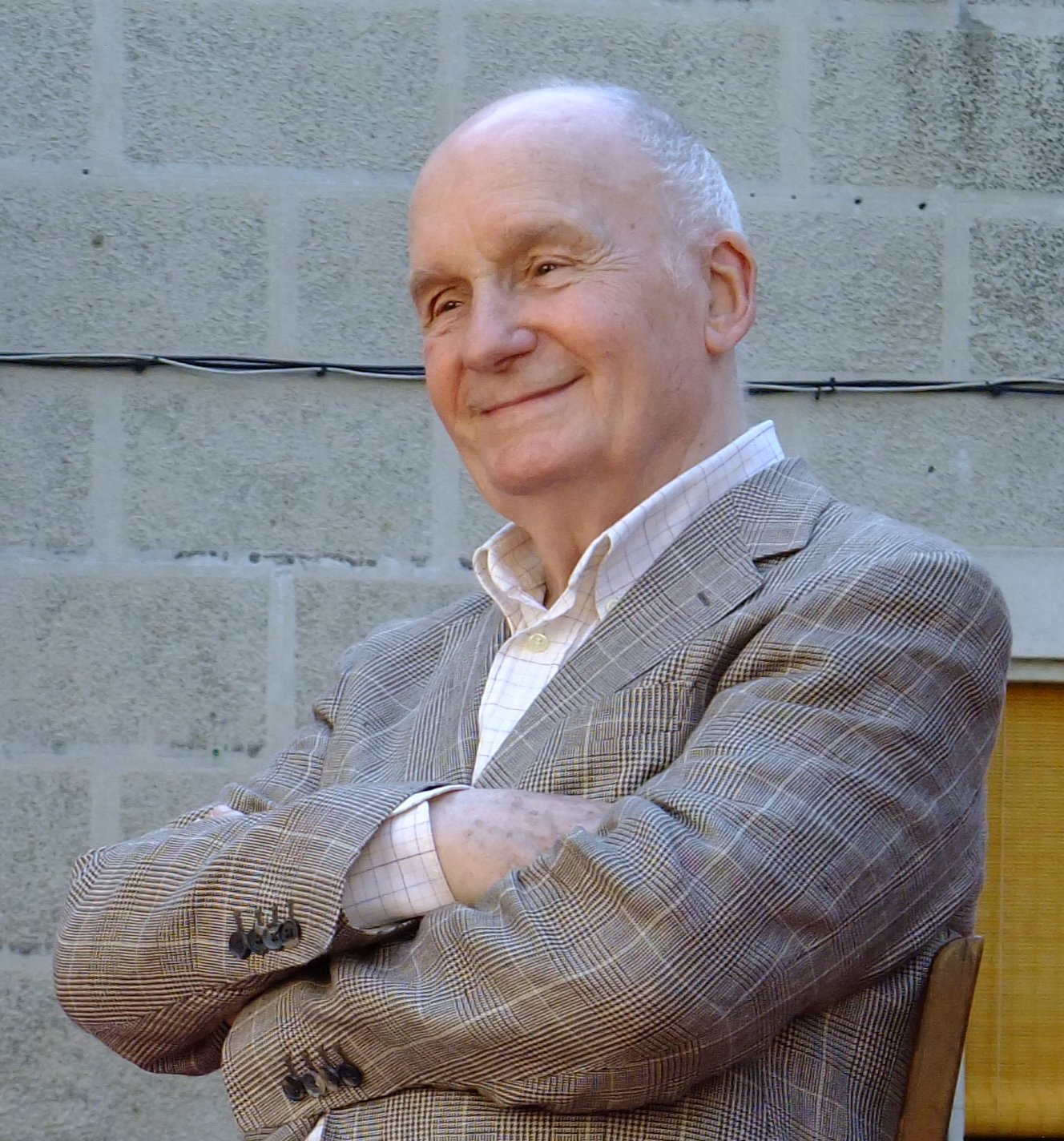
Michel Bouquet, Best Actor winner

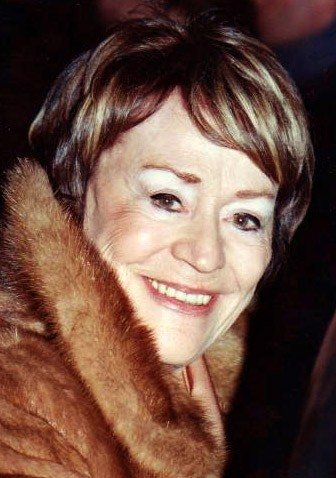
Annie Girardot, Best Supporting Actress winner

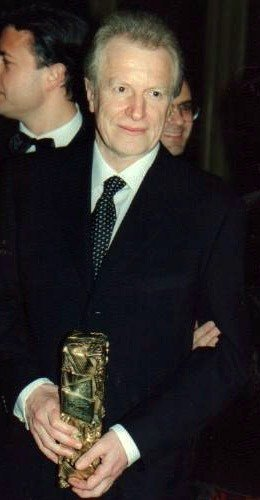
André Dussollier, Best Supporting Actor winner

Best Film Amélie: Chaos; The Officers' Ward; Read My Lips; Under the Sand	Best Director Jean-Pierre Jeunet – Amélie: Jacques Audiard – Read My Lips; Patrice Chéreau – Intimacy; François Dupeyron – The Officers' Ward; François Ozon – Under the Sand
Best Actor Michel Bouquet – How I Killed My Father: Éric Caravaca – The Officers' Ward; Vincent Cassel – Read My Lips; André Dussollier – Tanguy; Jacques Dutronc – C'est la vie	Best Actress Emmanuelle Devos – Read My Lips: Catherine Frot – Chaos; Isabelle Huppert – The Piano Teacher; Charlotte Rampling – Under the Sand; Audrey Tautou – Amélie
Best Supporting Actor André Dussollier – The Officers' Ward: Édouard Baer – Alias Betty; Jamel Debbouze – Amélie; Jean-Paul Roussillon – The Girl from Paris; Rufus – Amélie	Best Supporting Actress Annie Girardot – The Piano Teacher: Nicole Garcia – Alias Betty; Noémie Lvovsky – My Wife Is an Actress; Isabelle Nanty – Amélie; Line Renaud – Chaos
Most Promising Actor Robinson Stévenin – Transfixed: Éric Berger – Tanguy; Stefano Cassetti – Roberto Succo; Grégori Derangère – The Officers' Ward; Jean-Michel Portal – The Officers' Ward	Most Promising Actress Rachida Brakni – Chaos: Marion Cotillard – Pretty Things; Hélène Fillières – A Hell of a Day; Hélène de Fougerolles – Va savoir; Isild Le Besco – Roberto Succo
Best Original Screenplay or Adaptation Read My Lips – Jacques Audiard and Tonino Benacquista: Amélie – Jean-Pierre Jeunet and Guillaume Laurant; Chaos – Coline Serreau; No Man's Land – Danis Tanović; The Officers' Ward – François Dupeyron	Best First Feature Film No Man's Land: Gregoire Moulin vs. Humanity; My Wife Is an Actress; The Girl from Paris; Winged Migration
Best Cinematography Tetsuo Nagata – The Officers' Ward: Bruno Delbonnel – Amélie; Mathieu Vadepied – Read My Lips	Best Editing Marie-Josèphe Yoyotte – Winged Migration: Hervé Schneid – Amélie; Juliette Welfling – Read My Lips
Best Sound Cyril Holtz and Pascal Villard – Read My Lips: Vincent Arnardi, Gérard Hardy and Jean Umansky – Amélie; Cyril Holtz and Jean-Paul Mugel – Brotherhood of the Wolf	Best Original Music Yann Tiersen – Amélie: Joseph LoDuca – Brotherhood of the Wolf; Alexandre Desplat – Read My Lips; Bruno Coulais – Winged Migration
Best Costume Design Dominique Borg – Brotherhood of the Wolf: Madeline Fontaine – Amélie; Pierre-Jean Larroque – The Lady and the Duke; Catherine Bouchard – The Officers' Ward	Best Production Design Aline Bonetto – Amélie: Guy-Claude François – Brotherhood of the Wolf; Antoine Fontaine – The Lady and the Duke
Best Short Film A Summer Night Rendez-vous: Pieces of My Wife; Les Filles du douze; Millevaches (expérience); The Apple, the Fig and the Almond	Best Foreign Film Mulholland Drive: The Man Who Wasn't There; Moulin Rouge!; The Son's Room; Traffic
Honorary César Anouk Aimée; Jeremy Irons; Claude Rich

== Films with multiple nominations and awards ==
The following films received multiple nominations:

Nominations	Film
13	Amélie
9	The Officers' Ward
9	Read My Lips
5	Chaos
4	Brotherhood of the Wolf
3	Under the Sand
3	Winged Migration
2
2	Tanguy
2	The Piano Teacher
2	Alias Betty
2	The Girl from Paris
2	My Wife Is an Actress
2	Roberto Succo
2	No Man's Land
2	The Lady and the Duke

The following films received multiple awards:

Awards	Film
4	Amélie
3	Read My Lips
2	The Officers' Ward

== See also ==
- 74th Academy Awards
- 55th British Academy Film Awards
- 14th European Film Awards
- 7th Lumière Awards
