= List of 2001 box office number-one films in France =

This is a list of films which have placed number one at the weekly box office in France during 2001. Amounts are in French franc.

== Number-one films ==
Le Fabuleux destin d’Amélie Poulain became the highest grossing film of 2001, despite not reaching #1 during the year.

#	Week ending	Film	Box office	Notes	Ref
1	3 January 2001	Unbreakable	€49,428,869		
2	9 January 2001	Unbreakable	€32,777,248		
3	16 January 2001	Unbreakable	€16,096,773		
4	23 January 2001	Le Placard	€47,433,456		
5	30 January 2001	Le Placard	€43,334,053		
6	6 February 2001	Brotherhood of the Wolf	€70,067,599		
7	13 February 2001	La Vérité si je mens 2 !	€103,029,794		
8	20 February 2001	La Vérité si je mens 2 !	€69,795,215		
9	27 February 2001	La Vérité si je mens 2 !	€41,300,602		
10	8 March 2001	Hannibal	€43,596,532		
11	13 March 2001	Hannibal	€22,179,395		
12	22 March 2001	The Exorcist (reissue)	€21,642,278		
13	29 March 2001	The Exorcist (reissue)	€14,935,578		
14	3 April 2001	La Tour Montparnasse Infernale	€27,627,271		
15	8 April 2001	Belphegor, Phantom of the Louvre	€30,926,826		
16	17 April 2001	Just Visiting	€20,330,527		
17	22 April 2001	Yamakasi	€15,278,823	Yamakasi reached number one in its third week of release	
18	1 May 2001	Amélie	€43,168,398		
19	8 May 2001	Amélie	€43,561,588		
20	15 May 2001	Amélie	€24,387,454		
21	22 May 2001	Amélie	€22,101,317		
22	31 May 2001	The Mummy Returns	€27,535,326		
23	7 June 2001	The Mummy Returns	€19,166,273		
24	14 June 2001	Pearl Harbor	€31,555,853		
25	20 June 2001	Pearl Harbor	€20,743,198		
26	27 June 2001	Pearl Harbor	€9,910,859		
27	5 July 2001	Lara Croft: Tomb Raider	€44,877,448		
28	10 July 2001	Shrek	€34,201,335		
29	18 July 2001	Shrek	€26,602,940		
30	26 July 2001	Shrek	€18,877,474		
31	2 August 2001	Scary Movie 2	€34,412,700		
32	8 August 2001	Kiss of the Dragon	€18,417,672		
33	15 August 2001	Jurassic Park III	€29,615,852		
34	21 August 2001	Final Fantasy: The Spirits Within	€25,488,715		
35	29 August 2001	Planet of the Apes	€56,857,647		
36	5 September 2001	Planet of the Apes	€33,224,758		
37	11 September 2001	Planet of the Apes	€15,539,720		
38	20 September 2001	Une hirondelle a fait le printemps	€13,021,225	Une hirondelle a fait le printemps reached number one in its second week of release	
39	27 September 2001	Vidocq	€28,094,297		
40	2 October 2001	Vidocq	€15,224,111		
41	11 October 2001	Moulin Rouge!	€14,696,822		
42	18 October 2001	Bridget Jones's Diary	€34,041,826		
43	25 October 2001	American Pie 2	€41,141,716		
44	1 November 1994	American Pie 2	€29,743,742		
45	8 November 2001	American Pie 2	€18,925,263		
46	15 November 2001	Wasabi	€9,444,169	Wasabi reached number one in its second week of release	
47	22 November 2001	My Wife Is an Actress	€6,978,944		
48	29 November 2001	Tanguy	€29,082,312		
49	5 December 2001	Atlantis: The Lost Empire	€35,337,890		
50	13 December 2001	Harry Potter and the Philosopher's Stone	€77,051,800	Harry Potter and the Philosopher's Stone beat Star Wars: Episode I – The Phantom Menace record as the biggest opening for a non-French film	
51	19 December 2001	Harry Potter and the Philosopher's Stone	€52,572,814		
52	26 December 2001	The Lord of the Rings: The Fellowship of the Ring	€65,000,000		

== See also ==
- List of French films of 2001
- Lists of box office number-one films
