= The Officers' Ward =

The Officers' Ward may refer to:

- The Officers' Ward (novel)
- The Officers' Ward (film)
