= Pascal Hérold =

French businessman

Pascal Hérold (born November 30, 1949, Neuilly-sur-Seine, France) is a French businessman and producer. He is the founder of Duran Duboi, Nadeo, and the Hérold & Family studio.

Hérold studied at Stanislas College. In 1966, he created a rock band with Olivier de Funès on drums.

In 1974, he and his wife founded Laboratoire DUPON, a professional photographic laboratory. In 1984, he founded with Bernard Maltaverne and a few friends the company DURAN, specializing in editing and special effects for television. In the following years, Duboi specialized in special effects for cinema. He joined successively with Pitof, Mike Birch, Tarek Ben Ammar and Jérôme Deschamps. His name is associated with the films: Joan of Arc, Amélie, and Immortel.

In 1997, Pascal Hérold was chairman of the technical film company Duran Duboi. In 2005, he left the group to found his own film production company "Hérold & Family" and the studio Delacave. He also created the video game company Nadeo, which experienced success through the Virtual Skipper game series and more importantly the TrackMania series that led to its sale to Ubisoft. He produced three feature films for the cinema and directed two animated films.
