= Bob Azzam =

Lebanese singer

- بوب عزام
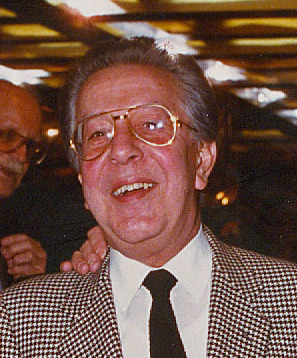
- Born: Waddie George Azzam; October 24, 1925; Alexandria, Egypt
- Died: July 26, 2004 (aged 78); Monaco
- Citizenship: Egyptian, French
- Occupations: Singer and orchestra leader
- Known for: Ya Mustafa

Wadie George Azzam, better known by his stage name Bob Azzam, (24 October 1925 in Alexandria – 26 July 2004 in Monaco) was an Egyptian born singer with Lebanese origins. With his hit song "Ya Mustafa", created and composed by Egyptian musician Mohamed Fawzi for the Egyptian movie; That's What Love Is (1961); Azzam achieved success in France in the 1960s, the song was later sung by other different singers. The track peaked at No. 23 in the UK Singles Chart, spending fourteen weeks in that chart. Azzam had a degree in electronic engineering, and has been regarded as the man behind the chamber of echoes "Hors-studio" or "off-studio".

== Biography ==
Azzam began his career in Italy in the late 1950s, with his band, singing in Italian and in English. In 1960, he released two songs in France that were influenced by oriental music, "Ya Mustafa" ("Chérie je t'aime, chérie je t'adore, como la salsa del pomodoro") and "Fais-moi du couscous, chéri". The same year, he received the Grand Prix du Disque for the song "Viens à Juan les Pins".

After this era, his success began to decline. However, Azzam continued his career by touring with his orchestra, and opened his own night club in Geneva.

Jonathan Richman, Rachid Taha and, most recently, La Bande à Basile have all performed covers of the songs "Mustafa" and "Fais-moi du couscous, chérie".

== EPs ==
- "Viens viens dans mes bras" / "Acrit dans le ciel" // "Les papous" / "Ola! Ola!" (Barclay, 72431, F, PS)
