= Le Passager =

Le Passager may refer to the following films:

- Caravan to Vaccarès (film), 1974 film
- The Passenger (2005 Éric Caravaca film)
