= Ya Mustafa =

Multilingual song from Egypt

"Ya Mustafa" also spelled "Ya Mustapha" (Arabic: يا مصطفى), is a well-known multilingual song from Egypt, composed by famous Egyptian Musician Mohamed Fawzi to feature in the Egyptian movie El Hub Keda (1961), in which Azzam appeared in cameo appearance as a singer while singing the song alongside leading actors Salah Zulfikar and Sabah, and which has then been recorded in many different languages for its unique and catchy tunes. Several different versions, including parodies, have been recorded. The song first became popular in Europe with the help of singer Bob Azzam, who released it in 1960 in France.

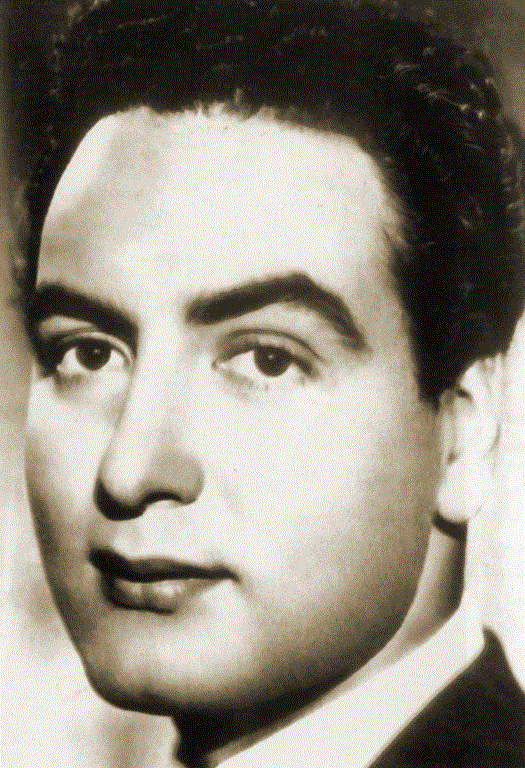
Mohamed Fawzi, Original Composer

== Versions ==
The song has been performed in many different versions by many different singers worldwide, including in Greek ("Μουσταφά"), Turkish and Serbian ("Mustafa") languages, where they are very popular in the respective countries. There was also a Hindi version used in the soundtrack of a Bollywood film. The music of the song is influenced by Greek music. The song was very popular in the 1950s and early 1960s, but its popularity is revived with newer versions of the song.

- In Europe the song became popular with the help of the Egyptian-born singer Bob Azzam, who released it in 1960 in France. Azzam's version was also a hit on the UK Singles Chart, where it spent 14 weeks and peaked at number 23.
- One of the singers to record this song (in 1962) was the Jewish–Turkish-French singer Darío Moreno.
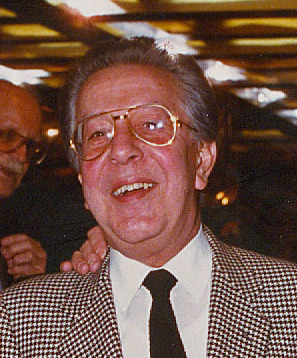
- Bob Azzam, Original Singer
  In Spain, in 1960, the song reached #1 in the charts in two versions sung by Bob Azzam and by José Guardiola.
- In Kosovo, the song was made in Albanian by Muharrem Qena.
- Bruno Gigliotti (also known as Orlando), the brother of the famous Egyptian-Italian then French singer Dalida and founder of the Orlando record label, covered the song. Dalida herself did it in 1984.
- Dick Lee also has a version of this song (retitled "Mustapha"), sung in English and several Singaporean dialects.
- Kyu Sakamoto also sang a version of this song in Japanese.
- In 1975, the Turkish Cypriot actress and singer Nil Burak sang "Ya Mustafa".
- The music was adapted by the Indian composers Nadeem-Shravan and appeared in the film Aatish starring Sanjay Dutt, Aditya Pancholi, Raveena Tandon, Karisma Kapoor. The vocals of Jolly Mukherjee, Mukul Aggarwal and Alka Yagnik were used for the song.
- The American singer and actress Angélica María made a recording in her album La Magia de Angélica María.
- The Lebanese singer Reeda Boutros has also interpreted the song.
- Spanish trumpeter Rudy Ventura covered the song in the early 1960s as "Mustafà català".
- Carles Belda performed "Mustafà català" in Catalan in Barcelona in 2008.
- The influential British folk-blues guitarist Davy Graham did his own instrumental jazzy version of the song on his album Folk, Blues and Beyond (1964, bonus track re-issued 2002). A short version of this was played live by Led Zeppelin guitarist Jimmy Page in a BBC session, called "White Summer/Black Mountainside" (Led Zeppelin Remasters 1). Page's recording and acoustic style generally was heavily influenced by Davy Graham's work.
- Performed by Lola Novaković in Serbian in 1960.
- Performed by Yugoslavian singer Djordje Marjanovic in Serbian in 1961.
- Performed by Serbian vocalist Nenad Jovanovic in Serbian in 1977.
- A Danish version appeared in the 1960 movie "Soldaterkammerater på vagt" (Operation Camel). In this version the song is addressed to Mustafa, a laze camel. Performed by the actors.
- In Indonesia, this song is used as the yell of the Scouts, which is popular with the lyrics Sudah lama tidak minum Jamu, Jamu-Jamu dari Daun Nangka. Sudah lama tidak ketemu, ketemu dengan Pramuka. (It's been a long time to not drinking herbal drinks, herbal drinks from jackfruit leaves. It's been a long time not to meet again, meet again with the Scouts.)
- A German language version by Greek singer Leo Leandros reached number 2 on the German charts in 1960.
- Slovenian singer Magnifico (musician) covered the song in the album Charlatan de Balkan in 2016 "Magnifico - discography". Archived from the original on 2020-11-30.

== Appearances ==
The song is featured in a number of Egyptian movies, including one starring the Egyptian actor Ismail Yassin in the 1950s, and another featuring Salah Zulfikar in the 1961 film That's What Love Is. It is also used in the Indian film Aatish. The comedy troupe Warkop made a parody of this song in their 1979 film debut, Mana Tahan.

The rhythm and melody of the song inspired many popular Egyptian chants, particularly related to Egyptian football. It is the most popular chant of Ahly (Cairo) fans, and is many directed at their most popular rivals Zamalek, they have used it to dis their rivals for more than 30 years. The Ahly chant has different lyrics and begins with a popular Egyptian folk term originally belonging to working farmers while digging the Suez Canal, (Egyptian Arabic: Hela Hela .. Hela Hela ..Ho) meaning "hey hey, COME ON! (for enthusiasm)", and is then followed by (Egyptian Arabic: El Zamalek k*** ommo) meaning "F*** the mothers of Zamalek" and vice versa. It is the most popular chant of Zamalek (Cairo) fans, and is many directed at their most popular rivals Ahly, Zamalek fans chant (Egyptian Arabic: Hela Hela .. Hela Hela ..Ho) meaning "hey hey, COME ON! (for enthusiasm)", and is then followed by (Egyptian Arabic: El Ahly k*** ommo) meaning "F*** the mothers of Ahly".

In 2019, the most popular chant for anti-government Lebanese protesters (particularly during the earliest protests) targeted their Caretaker Foreign Minister Gebran Bassil, began with the famous Ahly chant against their rivals Zamalek, "Hela hela, hela hela ho", then followed by "Gebran Bassil k**s emmo," which figuratively translates to "Hela hela, hela hela ho, f*** Gebran Bassil," but insults his mother's genitalia. The Free Patriotic Movement, which Bassil leads, created an alternative version which failed to achieve popularity: "Hela hela, hela hela ho, Gebran Bassil mnħebbo," meaning "we love him." Meanwhile, feminist activists in Beirut coined an alternative pro-revolution chant: "Hela hela, hela hela ho, ay*i bi Gebran wa bi 'ammo." This slogan, meaning "...f*** Gebran and his father-in-law." This revision more directly insults Bassil, rather than his mother, and includes the President of Lebanon Michel Aoun.

== See also ==
- List of best-selling singles by country
