= André Dussollier =

French actor (born 1946)

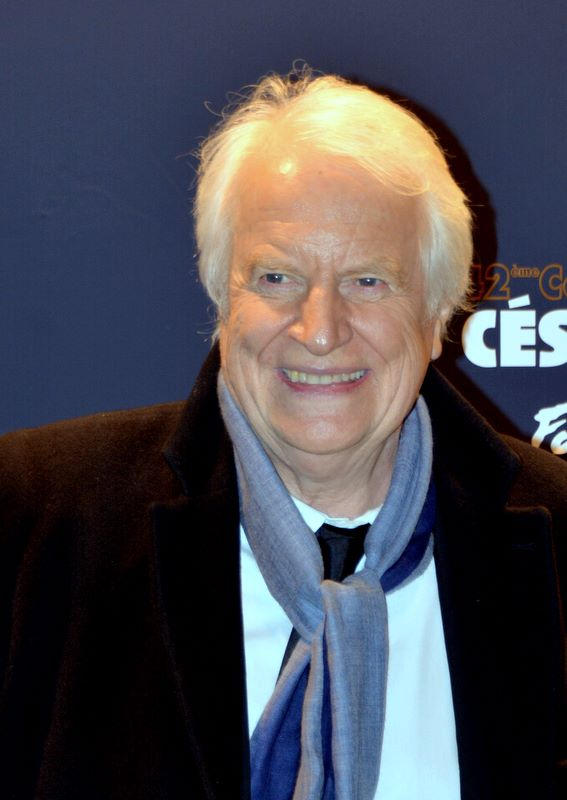
- Dussollier in 2017
- Born: 17 February 1946 (age 80); Annecy, Haute-Savoie, France
- Occupation: Actor
- Years active: 1970–present

André Dussollier (French: [ɑ̃dʁe dysɔlje]; born 17 February 1946) is a French actor.

== Selected filmography ==
Year	Title	Role	Director
1972	A Gorgeous Girl Like Me	Stanislas Prévine	François Truffaut
1974	And Now My Love	Simon	Claude Lelouch
1975	A Happy Divorce	François	Henning Carlsen
1977	Alice or the Last Escapade	young man in the park/the firefighter	Claude Chabrol
1977	Ben et Benedict	Bernard Chevalier	Paula Delsol
1978	Perceval le Gallois	Gauvain	Éric Rohmer
1980	Extérieur, nuit	Bony	Jacques Bral
1981	Temporary Paradise		
1982	Le Beau Mariage	Edmond	Éric Rohmer
1983	Life Is a Bed of Roses	Raoul Vandamme	Alain Resnais
1983	Liberty belle	Vidal	Pascal Kané
1984	The Children	Enrico	Marguerite Duras, Jean Mascolo and Jean-Marc Turine
1984	L'Amour à mort	Jérome Martignac	Alain Resnais
1984	Love on the Ground	Paul	Jacques Rivette
1984	Just the Way You Are	Francois Rossighol	Édouard Molinaro
1985	Three Men and a Cradle	Jacques	Coline Serreau
1986	Mélo	Marcel Blanc	Alain Resnais
1987	Blood and Sand	Emilio	Jeanne Labrune
1988	L'enfance de l'art	Luc Ferraud	Francis Girod
1988	Fréquence meurtre	Frank Quester	Élisabeth Rappeneau
1991	Sushi Sushi	Maurice Hartmann	Laurent Perrin
1992	White King, Red Queen	Alekseï Goriounov	Sergueï Bodrov
1992	A Heart in Winter	Maxime	Claude Sautet
1993	The Little Apocalypse	Jacques	Costa-Gavras
1994	Le Colonel Chabert	Count Ferraud	Yves Angelo
1997	Same Old Song	Simon	Alain Resnais
1997	An Air So Pure	Doctor Boyer	Yves Angelo
1998	Stolen Life	Jakob	Yves Angelo
1999	The Children of the Marshland	Amédée	Jean Becker
1999	Walking with Dinosaurs	Narrator (French dub)	Tim Haines and Jasper James
2000	Les Acteurs	Himself	Bertrand Blier
2001	A Crime in Paradise	Maître Jacquard	Jean Becker
2001	Amélie	narrator	Jean-Pierre Jeunet
2001	The Officers' Ward	the surgeon	François Dupeyron
2001	Vidocq	Lautresnares	Pitof
2001	Tanguy	Paul Guetz	Étienne Chatiliez
2003	Ruby & Quentin	the prison's psychiatric	Francis Veber
2003	Strange Gardens		
2004	A Very Long Engagement	Pierre-Marie Rouvières	Jean-Pierre Jeunet
2004	Secret Agents	Colonel Grasset	Frédéric Schoendoerffer
2004	36 Quai des Orfèvres	chief inspector Robert Mancini	Olivier Marchal
2005	Mon petit doigt m'a dit...	Bélisaire Beresford	Pascal Thomas
2005	Lemming	Richard Pollock	Dominik Moll
2006	Tell No One	Jacques Laurentis	Guillaume Canet
2006	Private Fears in Public Places	Thierry	Alain Resnais
2007	La Masseria Delle Allodole	Colonel Arkan	Paolo and Vittorio Taviani
2008	fr:Affaire de famille (film, 2008)	Jean Guignebont	Claus Drexel
2008	Le crime est notre affaire	Bélisaire Beresford	Pascal Thomas
2008	Musée haut, musée bas	The minister	Jean-Michel Ribes
2009	Wild Grass	Georges Palet	Alain Resnais
2009	Micmacs	Nicolas Thibaut de Fenouillet	Jean-Pierre Jeunet
2010	An Ordinary Execution	Joseph Stalin	
2011	Impardonnables	Francis	André Téchiné
2011	My Worst Nightmare	François	Anne Fontaine
2012	Associes contre le crime	Belisaire Beresford	Pascal Thomas
2014	Life of Riley	Simeon	Alain Resnais
2014	Beauty and the Beast	Merchant	Christophe Gans
2014	Diplomacy	Raoul Nordling	Volker Schlöndorff
2014	Brèves de comptoir	The politician	Jean-Michel Ribes
2014	High Society	As himself (voice, uncredited)	Julie Lopes-Curval
2015	My Golden Days	Claverie	Arnaud Desplechin
2015	Families	Pierre Cotteret	Jean-Paul Rappeneau
2015	The Great Game	Joseph	Nicolas Pariser
2015	21 Nights with Pattie	Jean	Arnaud and Jean-Marie Larrieu
2016	Roommates Wanted	Hubert Jacquin	François Desagnat
2017	This Is Our Land	Philippe Berthier	Lucas Belvaux
2018	Bad Seeds	Victor	Kheiron
2021	Everything Went Fine	André	François Ozon
2022	The Blaze	Joseph	Quentin Reynaud
2024	Dear Paris	Édouard Emmard	

== Awards and nominations ==
=== César Awards ===
Year	Award	Film	Result
1987	Best Actor	Mélo	Nominated
1993	Best Supporting Actor	A Heart in Winter (Un cœur en hiver)	Won
1998	Best Actor	Same Old Song (On connaît la chanson)	Won
2000	Best Supporting Actor	Les Enfants du marais	Nominated
2002	Best Actor	Tanguy	Nominated
2002	Best Supporting Actor	The Officers' Ward (La Chambre des officiers)	Won
2005	Best Supporting Actor	Department 36 (36, quai des Orfèvres)	Nominated
2007	Best Supporting Actor	Tell No One (Ne le dis à personne)	Nominated

=== Lumière Awards ===
Year	Award	Film	Result
2009	Best Actor	Cortex	Nominated

=== Molière Awards ===
Year	Award	Play	Result
1996	Best Actor	Scènes de la vie conjugales	Nominated
2002	Best Actor	Monstres sacrés, sacrés monstres	Nominated
2003	Best Actor	Monstres sacrés, sacrés monstres	Nominated
2011	Best Actor	Diplomatie	Nominated
2015	Best Actor in a Public Theatre	Novecento	Won
