= The Officers' Ward (novel) =

1998 novel by Marc Dugain

- First edition
- Author: Marc Dugain
- Original title: La chambre des officiers
- Translator: Howard Curtis
- Language: French
- Genre: War novel
- Published: 1998 by JC Lattès
- Publication place: France
- English publication date: 1999
- Pages: 172 p.
- ISBN: 978-2-7096-1903-5
- OCLC: 40167608
- Dewey Decimal: 840
- LC Class: PQ2664.U3479

The Officers' Ward (French, La chambre des officiers), is a novel by Marc Dugain, published in 1998 (1999 in English). It is supposedly based on the experiences of one of the author's own ancestors during World War I.

== Synopsis ==
Adrien Fournier, a handsome lieutenant in the Engineers, is the narrator and main protagonist. Adrien is wounded on a simple reconnaissance mission on the first day of French involvement in the Great War. He is hit by a stray shell, which kills his fellow officers and his horse, and destroys the centre of Adrien's face. Devastated and permanently disfigured, he spends the rest of the war in a hospital, in a maxillofacial unit, with a small group of others who have similar injuries—including a woman, Marguerite, who has been wounded while nursing at the Western Front. Adrien's palate and jaw are gradually reconstructed by pioneering plastic surgeons.

The novel follows the experiences of the group in the aftermath of the war and their subsequent lives, right up to World War II and beyond.

== Reception ==
The novel won eighteen literary prizes and was made into a film in 2001, directed by François Dupeyron and starring Eric Caravaca as the central character.
