= Claus Drexel =

German screenwriter and film director

- Born: June 24, 1968 (age 57)
- Occupations: Film director, screenwriter

Claus Drexel (born 24 June 1968) is a German screenwriter and film director. He has worked in France.

His first film, Affaire de famille, a comedy with Miou-Miou, André Dussollier and Hande Kodja, was released in 2008.

In 2012 he designed a performance of the St Matthew Passion of Johann Sebastian Bach at the Cirque d'Hiver in Paris.

Drexel's film Au Bord Du Monde ("on the edge of the world"), about homeless people in Paris, was made in 2012.

== Films ==
- 2008 : Affaire de famille
- 2012 : Au bord du monde
- 2018 : America
- 2020 : Sous les étoiles de Paris
