= Always with You =

Dayman Ma`ak
- Promotional poster
- Directed by: Henry Barakat
- Written by: Henry Barakat; Youssef Gohar
- Produced by: Mohamed Fawzi
- Starring: Mohamed Fawzi; Salah Nazmi; Faten Hamama; Abdel Waress Assar
- Cinematography: Alvisy Orphanily
- Music by: Mohamed Fawzi
- Release date: 1954
- Country: Egypt
- Language: Arabic

Dayman Ma`ak (Arabic: دايما معاك, Always With You) is a 1954 Egyptian musical comedy romance film directed and co-written by Henry Barakat and starring Mohamed Fawzi, Salah Nazmi, Faten Hamama, and Abdel Waress Assar.

== Plot ==
Tefeeda is a girl who leaves her brother-in-law, who was forcing her to steal. She hides with a friend who lives with three young men, and one of them, starts flirting with her, but she resists him. She marries her friend after the man tries to separate them several times. The story climaxes with a mysterious murder investigation.

== Cast ==
- Faten Hamama as Tefeeda
- Mohamed Fawzi as Hamada
- Abdel Waress Assar
- Salah Nazmi
