= Christian Carion =

French film director, dialogue writer and screenwriter

- Born: 4 January 1963 (age 62); Cambrai, Nord, France
- Occupation(s): Film director, screenwriter
- Years active: 1999–present

Christian Carion (born 4 January 1963) is a French film director, dialogue writer and screenwriter, gaining international attention for Joyeux Noël (Merry Christmas), which was nominated for several awards, including the 2005 Academy Award for Best Foreign Language Film.

== Life and career ==
Christian Carion was born into a family of farmers in the north of France. Carion's youth was spent in his parents' farm fields, where he was constantly reminded of World War I as the family often found dangerous, unexploded shells left over from the conflicts in the fields. He had also heard of the stories in which French soldiers would leave their trenches at night to meet with their wives in the surrounding German-occupied towns and return to fight the next morning. After passing his baccalauréat, he joined an engineering school affiliated to the French ministry of agriculture.

Later he decided to quit his scientific career and began shooting films he himself describes as "uninteresting". When he met Christophe Rossignon, both men started to collaborate in movie-making - Carion as film-maker and Rossignon as producer. In 1999, Rossignon also acted in Carion's short film Monsieur le député.

In 2001, Carion directed his first feature film: Une hirondelle a fait le printemps (The Girl from Paris), the story, an hommage to his upbringing, tells the meeting of a brooding farmer, Michel Serrault, and a parisian girl seeking the calm of the countryside, played by Mathilde Seigner. The film attracted over 2.4 million of French moviegoers.

Following this success, Carion started a more ambitious project, Joyeux Noël (Merry Christmas). Screened in Cannes for the film festival in 2005, this historic fiction film depicts the fraternizations of warriors from three different countries on the eve of Christmas during World War I. Carion stated that he'd never heard of the actual Christmas truce incidents while growing up in France, as the French Army and authorities suppressed them, having been viewed as an act of disobedience. He was introduced to the story via a historian who showed him photos and documents archived in France, Great Britain, and Germany. The film was a commercial success. It was nominated for numerous awards at the French César Awards and for the Oscar for Best Foreign Film.

Two years later, he filmed another historic film; L'Affaire Farewell (Farewell), with Emir Kusturica and Guillaume Canet - a spy film set in Russia and based on true events.

In 2014 he shot, on the roads of northern France, En mai, fais ce qu'il te plait. This movie is another historical piece about the exodus of millions of people in May 1940, when France was falling apart and the inhabitants of northern France were fleeing the German troops. Written using numerous recollections from the northern people, the film depicts the quest of a German dissident, looking for his son. The original music was composed by Ennio Morricone.

== Filmography ==
Year	Title	Credited as			Notes
Year	Title	Director	Screenwriter	Actor	Notes
1999	Monsieur le député	Yes	Yes	No	Short film
2001	The Girl from Paris (Une hirondelle a fait le printemps)	Yes	Yes	Yes	Palm Springs International Film Festival - John Schlesinger Award (Honourable Mention); Nominated—César Award for Best First Feature Film
2005	Joyeux Noël	Yes	Yes	Yes	Leeds International Film Festival - Audience Award; Santa Barbara International Film Festival - Audience Choice Award; Valladolid International Film Festival - FIPRESCI Prize; Nominated—Academy Award for Best Foreign Language Film; Nominated—BAFTA Award for Best Film Not in the English Language; Nominated—César Award for Best Film; Nominated—César Award for Best Original Screenplay; Nominated—European Film Academy People's Choice Award for Best European Film; Nominated—Golden Globe Award for Best Foreign Language Film; Nominated—Globes de Cristal Award for Best Film
2006	Tell No One (Ne le dis à personne)	No	No	Yes	
2009	Farewell (L'affaire Farewell)	Yes	Yes	Yes	
2015	Come What May (En mai, fais ce qu'il te plaît)	Yes	Yes	No	
2017	Mon garçon	Yes	Yes	No	
2021	My Son	Yes	Yes	No	
2022	Driving Madeleine (Une belle course)	Yes	Yes	No	
