= Come What May (film) =

- Film poster
- French: En mai, fais ce qu'il te plaît
- Directed by: Christian Carion
- Written by: Christian Carion; Andrew Bampfield; Laure Irrmann
- Produced by: Philip Boëffard; Christophe Rossignon
- Starring: August Diehl; Olivier Gourmet; Mathilde Seigner; Matthew Rhys; Alice Isaaz; Jacques Bonnaffé
- Cinematography: Pierre Cottereau
- Edited by: Laure Gardette
- Music by: Ennio Morricone
- Production companies: Nord Ouest films Pathé
- Distributed by: Pathé
- Release dates: 10 October 2015 (Festival International du Film de Saint-Jean-de-Luz); 4 November 2015
- Running time: 114 minutes
- Country: France
- Languages: French; German; English
- Budget: €15.2 million
- Box office: $1.1 million

Come What May (French: En mai, fais ce qu'il te plaît; also titled Darling Buds of May and The Evacuation) is a 2015 French war drama film directed by Christian Carion. It stars August Diehl and Olivier Gourmet in lead roles, and was released on 4 November 2015. The film score was composed by Ennio Morricone.

== Plot ==
On 10 May 1940, the German Army invades Belgium and France via the Ardennes.

Frightened by the progress of the enemy, the people of the small village of Lebucquière decide, on the recommendations of the prefecture, to give up everything to go on the road, fleeing to the coast city Dieppe.

Among them is Paul, the village mayor. He leads the group, seeking to maintain a minimum of order and republican spirit in this nomadic life. Mado, his wife, plays music, trying to recreate the fragrance of life when friends would come to his coffee shop in the village.

Suzanne, a young teacher, acts as a scout to choose the least congested route. She supports a small German boy, Max, 8 years old, whose father Hans, an anti-Nazi dissident, was arrested by the French authorities following the declaration of war.

During the Battle of Arras, residents are released from prison and abandoned in the deserted city. Hans manages to flee the city, accompanied by a Scottish officer, Percy, whose entire unit died under German bullets.

These two will travel together. Hans seeking to recover his son who fled the village, and Percy hoping to reach the sea to find a boat back to England.

== Cast ==
- August Diehl as Hans
- Olivier Gourmet as Paul
- Mathilde Seigner as Mado
- Alice Isaaz as Suzanne
- Matthew Rhys as Percy
- Jacques Bonnaffé as Roger
- Joshio Marlon as Max
- Laurent Gerra as Albert

== Production ==
En mai, fais ce qu'il te plaît was produced by Nord Ouest films and Pathé.

== Accolades ==
| Award / Film Festival | Category | Recipients and nominees | Result |
|---|---|---|---|
| César Awards | Best Original Music | Ennio Morricone | Nominated |
