= My Worst Nightmare =

- Film poster
- Directed by: Anne Fontaine
- Screenplay by: Anne Fontaine; Nicolas Mercier
- Produced by: Philippe Carcassonne; Diana Elbaum; Bruno Pésery; Patrick Quinet; Jérôme Seydoux
- Starring: Benoît Poelvoorde; Isabelle Huppert; André Dussollier
- Cinematography: Jean-Marc Fabre
- Edited by: Luc Barnier; Nelly Ollivault
- Music by: Bruno Coulais
- Distributed by: Pathé
- Release date: 9 November 2011 (France)
- Running time: 103 minutes
- Countries: France; Belgium
- Language: French
- Budget: $12.8 million
- Box office: $8.2 million

My Worst Nightmare (original title: Mon pire cauchemar) is a 2011 French-Belgian comedy-drama film written and directed by Anne Fontaine, starring Isabelle Huppert, Benoît Poelvoorde and André Dussollier.

== Plot ==
Icy, uptight Agathe is a successful art dealer who lives with her longtime partner François, a publisher, and their teenage son Adrien in a wealthy quarter of Paris. Adrien is an underachiever at school, and Agathe is desperate to keep him on track to a good education. At a parent-teacher conference, she clashes with Patrick, who is the father of one of Adrien's friends, Tony. Unlike the reserved and repressed François, Patrick is a vulgar, but fun-loving blue-collar skirt-chaser. François becomes intrigued by Patrick's carefree lifestyle and hires him to renovate the family's apartment, much to Agathe's chagrin. Patrick and Agathe clash repeatedly due to their differences, and Agathe is distraught when François lets the homeless Patrick live at the apartment even after renovations are completed. However, Agathe develops a soft spot for the brilliant but underprivileged Tony, especially when Adrien's grades seem to improve due to his influence.

Through Patrick, François meets Julie, a young social worker who Patrick is trying to seduce. They quickly enter an affair, and on Patrick's encouragement due to his awareness of François's sexless relationship with Agathe, François leaves her for Julie. Meanwhile, Adrien is revealed to be cheating to improve his grades, and is expelled from the school. Patrick feels guilty about encouraging François to abandon the family, and he attends one of Agathe's art shows, where they bond and then sleep together during a long night of drinking. Later, when social services interview Patrick to assess whether Tony belongs in foster care, Agathe agrees to pretend to be his partner in order to help him keep custody of Tony.

After François realizes that he is too meek to keep up with the new-age and adrenaline-chasing Julie, he returns to the apartment, and is surprised to find that the family operating normally. François impulsively proposes marriage, but Agathe rejects him and reveals her encounter with Patrick; François returns to Julie. Patrick and Agathe grow closer, and they begin to have a normal life with Tony and Adrien, but their relationship is tested when Agathe refuses to invite the tactless Patrick to a dinner with a renowned artist; an upset Patrick drinks heavily, returns to the apartment, and embarrasses her in front of the guests. The next morning, social workers arrive for an inspection into the "couple's" home life, only to learn from an unwitting Adrien that their situation is dysfunctional, and Patrick is missing. The unimpressed social workers declare that Tony will be placed in foster care shortly.

Agathe learns that Patrick returned to his brother's home in Belgium and departs to retrieve him, telling him that she also needs him. However, Patrick refuses to return to France, saying that he is unworthy of being Tony's father and that he is no good for her. Heartbroken, Agathe returns home, where she learns that Adrien wants to live with François and newly-pregnant Julie instead of with her. Patrick returns to reveal that he is leaving with Tony (who admits the scheme to help Adrien cheat was his idea) to escape child services, but Agathe finds a solution by hastily marrying Patrick. Despite the sham wedding, Agathe is happy to be with Patrick, and gifts him an expensive portrait that he can sell to finally achieve his dream of opening a concept aquarium. However, when partying in Belgium, the picture is ruined, and an outraged Agathe breaks up with him. Patrick leaves to work a menial job for a few months; when they reunite, Patrick asserts he is a changed man who no longer drinks. He tells Agathe that he wanted to be a better man for her, but Agathe is uninterested in resuming their relationship. Patrick returns the defaced portrait, which seems to change Agathe's mind. Sometime later, he arrives at an opening to the aquarium concept he had dreamed of, and Agathe reveals that she had framed the defaced portrait, which is now considered a great work of art. The couple finally reunites for good.

== Cast ==
- Isabelle Huppert as Agathe Novic
- Benoît Poelvoorde as Patrick Demeuleu
- André Dussollier as François Dambreville
- Virginie Efira as Julie
- Corentin Devroey as Tony
- Donatien Suner as Adrien
- Aurélien Recoing as Thierry
- Éric Berger as Sébastien
- Philippe Magnan as The principal
- Bruno Podalydès as Marc-Henri
- Samir Guesmi as The DDASS Inspector
- Jean-Luc Couchard as Milou Demeuleu
- Émilie Gavois-Kahn as Sylvie / Karen

== Critical reception ==
"My worst nightmare" was evaluated as an "utterly conventional French bourgeois comedy". Still it was also considered "watchable" just because of its cast.

Isabelle Huppert was in particular praised for making Agathe's transformation believable. Benoît Poelvoorde's performance was recognised a "often irritable and hilarious". Diego Costa wrote for Slant Magazine "My worst nightmare" was coined by a very Frenchkind of humor which could "go right over American audience's heads".

== See also ==
- Isabelle Huppert on screen and stage
