= C'est quoi la vie? =

1999 film

- DVD cover
- Directed by: François Dupeyron
- Written by: François Dupeyron
- Produced by: Maurice Bernart
- Starring: Éric Caravaca; Jacques Dufilho
- Cinematography: Tetsuo Nagata
- Music by: Michel Portal
- Distributed by: Diaphana Films
- Release dates: 12 June 1999 (French Film Festival (Japan)); 8 September 1999 (France)
- Running time: 115 minutes
- Country: France
- Language: French

C'est quoi la vie? is a 1999 French drama film directed by François Dupeyron. The film received two nominations at the César Awards 2000 and won Most Promising Actor for Éric Caravaca.

== Cast ==
- Éric Caravaca - Nicolas
- Jacques Dufilho - Noël, le grand-père
- Jean-Pierre Darroussin - Marc, le père
- Isabelle Renauld - Maria
- Michelle Goddet - Monique
- Claudine Mavros - Laure
- Elie Tazartes - Patty
- Licino Da Silva - Rémy
- Julie-Anne Roth - Pauline
- Yves Verhoeven - Bruno
