= Delphine Serina =

French actress (1970–2020)

- Born: 6 May 1970; Paris, France
- Died: 19 April 2020 (aged 49); Paris, France
- Occupation: Actress

Delphine Serina (6 May 1970 – 19 April 2020) was a French actress.

== Biography ==
Born in Paris, Serina's father was from Sicily, and her mother was from Auvergne. She spent her childhood in Montmartre and studied at the National School Of Arts And Techniques Du Théatre. Serina often performed with Alain Delon, Claudia Cardinale, and Francis Huster. She trained for a year at La Fémis, creating a script and starring herself as the heroine.

Delphine Serina died on 19 April 2020 at the age of 49 in Paris following a long illness.

== Filmography ==
- The Liars (1996)
- On Guard (1997)
- Heureuse (2001)
- Tanguy (2001)
- Judas (2006)
- Chrysalide (2012)
- Monsieur je-sais-tout (2018)
