= The Girl from Paris =

The Girl from Paris may refer to:

- The Girl from Paris, another title for the Edwardian musical The Gay Parisienne
- The Girl from Paris (1950 film), a 1950 Egyptian film directed by Helmy Rafla
- The Girl from Paris (2001 film), a 2001 French film directed by Christian Carion
