= Marc Dugain =

French writer

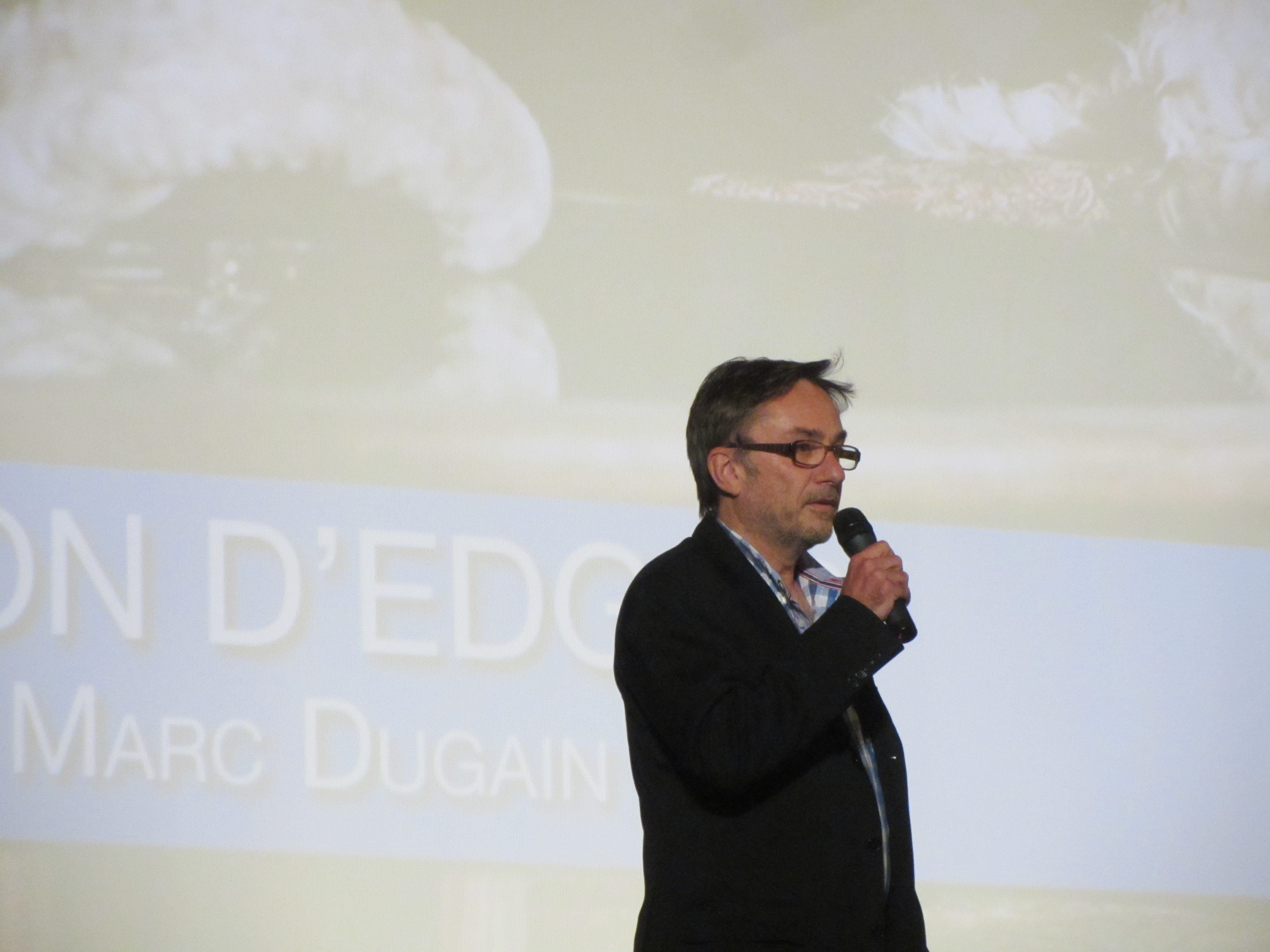
- Born: 1957 (age 68–69); Senegal
- Education: Institut d'études politiques de Grenoble
- Occupation: Novelist

Marc Dugain (born 1957) is a French novelist and film director, best known for La Chambre des Officiers (English, The Officers' Ward) (1999), a novel set in World War I.

Dugain was born in Senegal and studied at the Institut d'études politiques de Grenoble. He worked in finance, created a financial engineering company and was also a teacher and lecturer in finance at Emlyon Business School.

His prize-winning first novel was made into a successful film in 2001.

== Bibliography ==
- La Chambre des officiers], Éditions JC Lattès, 1999. Translated to English as The Officer's Ward, by Howard Curtis, Phoenix House (UK) 2000, Soho Press (USA) 2001.
- Campagne anglaise, 2000.
- Heureux comme Dieu en France, 2002.
- La Malédiction d'Edgar, Gallimard, 2005.
- Une exécution ordinaire, Gallimard, 2007.
- En bas, les nuages, Flammarion, 2008.
- L'Insomnie des étoiles, Gallimard, 2010.
- Avenue des géants, Gallimard, 2012. Translated to English by Howard Curtis as Avenue of the Giants, Europa Editions, 2014.
- L'Homme nu. La dictature invisible du numérique (avec Christophe Labbé), éditions Robert Laffont et Plon, 2016. ISBN 978-2-259-22779-7
- Transparence, Gallimard, 2019.
- La volonté, Gallimard, 2021.
