= Kassaman =

National anthem of Algeria

English: We Pledge
- قَسَمًا
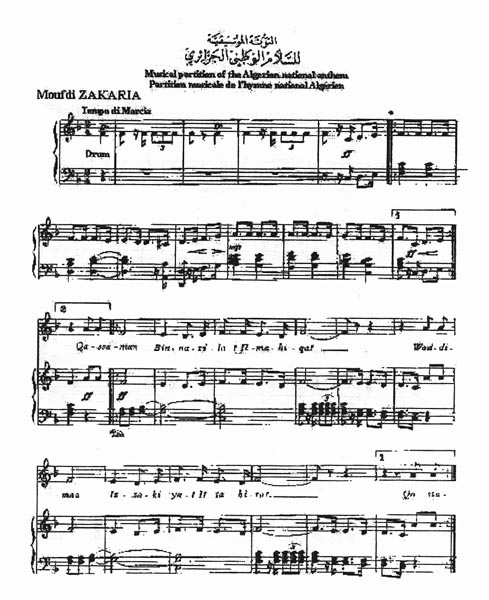
- National anthem of Algeria
- Also known as: "Qassaman" (English: "We Pledge")
- Lyrics: Moufdi Zakaria
- Music: Mohamed Fawzi
- Adopted: 1962; 64 years ago
- Readopted: 2008; 18 years ago

Audio sample
- U.S. Navy Band instrumental version (one verse) in B-flat major: file; help

"Kassaman", or "Qassaman" (Arabic: قَسَمًا, romanized: Qasaman, "we pledge", "the oath" or "we swear"), is the national anthem of Algeria. Moufdi Zakaria authored the lyrics, while the music was composed by Egyptian composer Mohamed Fawzi. The song was adopted as the national anthem in 1962, when the country gained independence from France.

== History ==
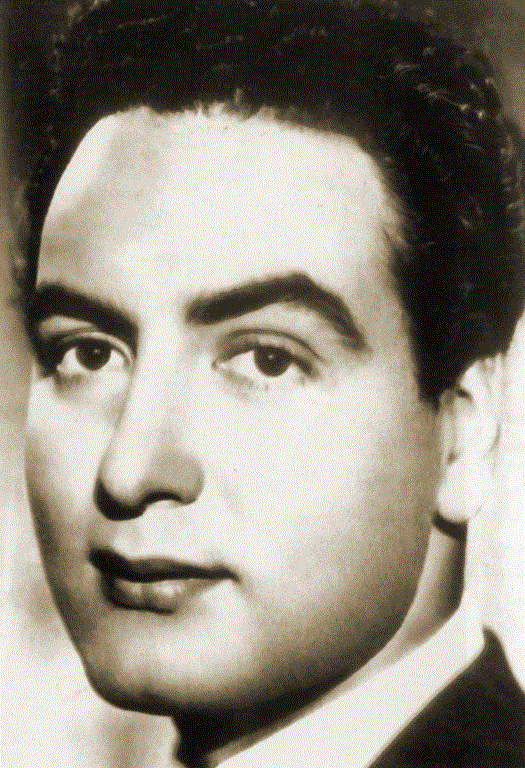
Moufdi Zakaria (left) authored the lyrics to "Kassaman", while Mohamed Fawzi (right) composed the music.

The French invaded Ottoman Algeria in 1830 and made it an integral part of Metropolitan France within its colonial empire. For the next century, the native population were given very few political rights. Consequently, a nationalist movement began in the 1920s and gained traction after World War II, when a commitment by the government to grant French Algeria autonomy failed to materialize. A prominent member of this movement was Moufdi Zakaria, a Mozabite Berber poet affiliated with the Algerian People's Party (PPA). He was jailed and tortured on several occasions between the 1920s and 1962. It was during one of these experiences, in April 1955, that he penned the words to "Kassaman". Since he did not have access to paper or writing instruments while incarcerated in Barberousse Prison, Zakaria reportedly wrote the lyrics with his own blood on the walls of his jail cell. The musical portion of the anthem was subsequently composed by Mohamed Fawzi, who was asked to undertake this effort after two earlier submissions by other composers – one of which was by Mohamed Triki – were rejected.

Both the lyrics and music were officially adopted in 1962; in that same year, the Évian Accords were signed, paving the way for a referendum in which Algerians overwhelmingly voted in favour of independence, which was duly granted. Although "Kassaman" was only intended to be a provisional national anthem, it has endured to this day.

== Lyrics ==
The lyrics of "Kassaman" are reflective of a war song, This is because it promotes nationalistic ideals and principles on the front line, glorifies the actions of the National Liberation Front (FLN), as well as espousing armed uprising and how it is the sole route to attaining independence. It is also noteworthy in that it alludes to another country – France – specifically concerning the violent struggle against them for independence. The song foreshadows how "the day of reckoning" will befall Algeria's former colonial ruler.

Usually only the first verse of the anthem is performed for brevity, such as during sporting events. However, per decree of Algerian President Abdelmadjid Tebboune, all stanzas of the anthem, including the third stanza (referring to France), must be performed at any events attended by the President of the Republic, including (but not limited to) welcome ceremonies for visiting Heads of State, presidential inaugurations, and FLN Congresses.

Arabic original

١
𝄇 قَسَمًا بِالنَّازِلَاتِ الْمَاحِقَاتْ
وَالدِّمَاءِ الزَّاكِيَاتِ الطَّاهِرَاتْ 𝄆
وَالْبُنُودِ اللَّامِعَاتِ الْخَافِقَاتْ
فِي الْجِبَالِ الشَّامِخَاتِ الشَّاهِقَاتْ
نَحْنُ ثُرْنَا فَحَيَاةٌ أَوْ مَمَاتْ
وَعَقَدْنَا الْعَزْمَ أَنْ تَحْيَا الْجَزَائِرْ
فَاشْهَدُواْ… فَاشْهَدُواْ… فَاشْهَدُواْ

٢
𝄇 نَحْنُ جُنْدٌ فِي سَبِيلِ الْحَقِّ ثُرْنَا
وَإِلَى اسْتِقْلَالِنَا بِالْحَرْبِ قُمْنَا 𝄆
لَمْ يَكُنْ يُصْغَى لَنَا لَمَا نَطَقْنَا
فَاتَّخَذْنَا رَنَّةَ الْبَارُودِ وَزْنَا
وَعَزَفْنَا نَغْمَةَ الرَّشَّاشِ لَحْنَا
وَعَقَدْنَا الْعَزْمَ أَنْ تَحْيَا الْجَزَائِرْ
فَاشْهَدُواْ… فَاشْهَدُواْ… فَاشْهَدُواْ

٣
𝄇 يَا فِرَنْسَا قَدْ مَضَى وَقْتُ الْعِتَابْ
وَطَوَيْنِاهُ كَمَا يُطْوَى الْكِتَابْ 𝄆
يَا فِرَنْسَا اِنَّ ذَا يَوْمُ الْحِسَابْ
فَاسْتَعِدِّي وَخُذِي مِنَّا الْجَوَابْ
اِنَّ فِي ثَوْرَتِنَا فَصْلُ الْخِطَابْ
وَعَقَدْنَا الْعَزْمَ أَنْ تَحْيَا الْجَزَائِرْ
فَاشْهَدُواْ… فَاشْهَدُواْ… فَاشْهَدُواْ

٤
𝄇 نَحْنُ مِنْ أَبْطَالِنَا نَدْفَعُ جُنْدًا
وَعَلَى أَشْلَائِنَا نَصْنَعُ مَجْدًا 𝄆
وَعَلَى أَرْوَاحِنَا نَصْعَدُ خُلْدًا
وَعَلَى هَامَاتِنَا نَرْفَعُ بَنْدًا
جَبْهَةُ التَّحْرِيرِ أَعْطَيْنَاكِ عَهْدًا
وَعَقَدْنَا الْعَزْمَ أَنْ تَحْيَا الْجَزَائِرْ
فَاشْهَدُواْ… فَاشْهَدُواْ… فَاشْهَدُواْ

٥
𝄇 صَرْخَةُ الْأَوْطَانِ مِنْ سَاحِ الْفِدَا
اِسْمَعُوهَا وَاسْتَجِيبُواْ لِلنِّدَا 𝄆
وَاكْتُبُوهَا بِدِمَاءِ الشُّهَدَا
وَاقْرَأُوهَا لِبَنِي الْجَيْلِ غَدَا
قَدْ مَدَدْنَا لَكَ يَا مَجْدُ يَدَا
وَعَقَدْنَا الْعَزْمَ أَنْ تَحْيَا الْجَزَائِرْ
فَاشْهَدُواْ… فَاشْهَدُواْ… فَاشْهَدُواْ

Transliteration

I
𝄆 Qasaman bi-n-nāzilāti l-māḥiqāt
Wa-d-dimāʾi z-zākiyāti ṭ-ṭāhirāt 𝄇
Wa-l-bunūdi l-lāmiʿāti l-khāfiqāt
Fi-l-jibāli sh-shāmikhāti sh-shāhiqāt
Naḥnu thurnā fa-ḥayātun ʾaw mamāt
Wa-ʿaqadnā al-ʿazma ʾan taḥyā l-Jazāʾir
Fa-shhadū! Fa-shhadū! Fa-shhadū!

II
𝄆 Naḥnu jundun fi sabīli l-ḥaqqi thurnā
Wa ʾila stiqlālinā bi-l-ḥarbi qumnā 𝄇
Lam yakun yuṣğā lanā lamā naṭaqnā
Fa-ttakhadhnā rannata l-bārūdi waznā.
Wa-ʿazafnā nağmata r-rashshāshi laḥnā
Wa-ʿaqadnā al-ʿazma ʾan taḥyā l-Jazāʾir
Fa-shhadū! Fa-shhadū! Fa-shhadū!

III
𝄆 Yā Firansā, qad maḍā waqtu l-ʿitāb
Wa-ṭawaynāhu kamā yuṭwā l-kitāb 𝄇
Yā Firansā ʾinna dhā yawmu l-ḥisāb
Fa-staʿiddī wa-khudhī minnā l-jawāb
ʾInna fī thawratinā faṣlu l-khiṭāb
Wa-ʿaqadnā al-ʿazma ʾan taḥyā l-Jazāʾir
Fa-shhadū! Fa-shhadū! Fa-shhadū!

IV
𝄆 Naḥnu min ʾabṭālinā nadfaʿu jundā
Wa-ʿala ʾashlaʾinā naṣnaʿu majdā. 𝄇
Wa-ʿala ʾarwāḥinā naṣʿadu khuldā.
Wa-ʿala hāmātinā narfaʿu bandā.
Jabhatu t-Taḥrīri ʾaʿṭaynāki ʿahdā.
Wa-ʿaqadnā al-ʿazma ʾan taḥyā l-Jazāʾir
Fa-shhadū! Fa-shhadū! Fa-shhadū!

V
𝄆 Ṣarkhatu l-ʾawṭāni min sāḥi l-fidā
Ismaʿūhā wa-stajībū li-n-nidā 𝄇
Wa-ktubūhā bi-dimāʾi sh-shuhadāʾ
Wa-qraʾūhā li-banī l-jayli ğadā.
Qad madadnā laka yā majdu yadā
Wa-ʿaqadnā al-ʿazma ʾan taḥyā l-Jazāʾir
Fa-shhadū! Fa-shhadū! Fa-shhadū!

IPA transcription (Note: See Help:IPA/Arabic and Algerian Arabic.)

1
𝄆 [qɑ.sæ.mæn bɪn.næː.zi.læː.tɪ‿l.mæː.ħɪ.qɑːt]
[wæ‿d.di.mæː.ʔɪ‿z.zæː.ki.jæː.tɪ‿tˤ.tˤɑː.hɪ.rɑːt] 𝄇
[wæ‿l.bu.nuːdɪ‿l.æː.mɪ.ʕæː.tɪ‿l.χɑː.fi.qɑːt]
[fɪ‿l.ʒi.bæː.lɪ‿ʃ.ʃæː.mɪ.χɑː.tɪ‿ʃ.ʃæː.hɪ.qɑːt]
[næħ.nʊ t̪ʊr.næː fæ.ħæ.jæː.tʊn ʔɑw mæ.mæːt]
[wɑ ʕɑ.qɑd.næː‿l.ʕæz.mæ ʔæn tæħ.jæː‿l.ʒæ.zæ.ʔɪr]
[fæʃ.hæ.dʊ fæʃ.hæ.dʊ fæʃ.hæ.dʊ]

2
𝄆 [næħ.nʊ ʒʊn.dʊn fi sæ.biː.lɪ‿l.ħæq.qɪ t̪ʊr.nɑː]
[wæ ʔɪ.lɑ stɪq.læː.li.nɑː bɪl.ħær.bɪ qʊm.nɑː] 𝄇
[læm jæ.kʊn jʊsˤ.ʁɑ læ.næː læ.mɑː næ.tˤɑq.nɑː]
[fæ‿t.tæ.χɑd̪.næː rɑn.næ.tæ‿l.bæː.rʊː.di wæz.nɑː]
[wæ ʕæ.zæf.næː næʁ.mæ.tæ‿r.rɑʃ.ʃæː.ʃi læħ.nɑː]
[wɑ ʕɑ.qɑd.næː‿l.ʕæz.mæ ʔæn tæħ.jæː‿l.ʒæ.zæ.ʔɪr]
[fæʃ.hæ.dʊ fæʃ.hæ.dʊ fæʃ.hæ.dʊ]

3
𝄆 [jɑː fi.ræn.sɑː qɑd mɑ.dˤɑ wɑq.tʊ‿l.ʕɪ.tæːb]
[wɑ tˤɑ.wæj.næː.hʊ kæ.mæː jʊtˤ.wæː‿l.ki.tæːb] 𝄇
[jɑː fi.ræn.sæː ʔɪn.næ d̪æː jæw.mʊ‿l.ħi.sæːb]
[fæs.tæ.ʕɪd.diː wæ χʊ.d̪iː mɪn.næː‿l.ʒæ.wæːb]
[ʔɪn.na fiː t̪ɑw.rɑ.ti.nɑː fæsˤ.lʊ‿l.χɪ.tˤɑːb]
[wɑ ʕɑ.qɑd.næː‿l.ʕæz.mæ ʔæn tæħ.jæː‿l.ʒæ.zæ.ʔɪr]
[fæʃ.hæ.dʊ fæʃ.hæ.dʊ fæʃ.hæ.dʊ]

4
𝄆 [næħ.nʊ mɪn ʔɑb.tˤɑː.li.næː næd.fæ.ʕʊ ʒʊn.dɑː]
[wæ ʕæ.lɑ ʔæʃ.læ.ʔɪ.nɑː næsˤ.nɑ.ʕʊ mæʒ.dɑː] 𝄇
[wæ ʕæ.lɑ ʔɑr.wɑː.ħi.næː næsˤ.ʕɑ.dʊ χʊl.dɑː]
[wæ ʕæ.læ hæː.mæː.tɪ.næː nær.fæ.ʕʊ bæn.dɑː]
[ʒæb.hæ.tʊ‿t.tæħ.rɪː.ri ʔɑʕ.tˤɑj.næː.ki ʕæh.dɑː]
[wɑ ʕɑ.qɑd.næː‿l.ʕæz.mæ ʔæn tæħ.jæː‿l.ʒæ.zæ.ʔɪr]
[fæʃ.hæ.dʊ fæʃ.hæ.dʊ fæʃ.hæ.dʊ]

5
𝄆 [sˤɑr.χɑ.tʊ‿l.ʔɑw.tˤɑː.ni mɪn sæː.ħɪ‿l.fi.dɑː]
[ɪs.mæ.ʕuː.hɑː wæ‿s.tæ.ʒiː.bʊː lɪn.ni.dɑː] 𝄇
[wæ‿k.tʊ.bʊː.hæː bɪ.di.mæː.ʔɪ‿ʃ.ʃʊ.hæ.dɑːʔ]
[wɑ‿q.rɑ.ʔʊː.hæː li.bæ.niː‿l.ʒæj.li ʁɑ.dɑː]
[qɑd mæ.dæd.næː læ.kæ jæː mæʒ.dʊ jæ.dɑː]
[wɑ ʕɑ.qɑd.næː‿l.ʕæz.mæ ʔæn tæħ.jæː‿l.ʒæ.zæ.ʔɪr]
[fæʃ.hæ.dʊ fæʃ.hæ.dʊ fæʃ.hæ.dʊ]

English translation

I
𝄆 We swear by the lightning that destroys,
By the streams of generous blood being shed, 𝄇
By the bright flags that wave,
Flying proudly on the high mountains
That we are in revolt, whether to live or to die,
We are determined that Algeria should live,
So be our witness -be our witness -be our witness!

II
𝄆 We are soldiers, for the sake of justice we revolted,
And for our independence we waged war, 𝄇
When we spoke, nobody listened to us,
So we have taken the noise of gunpowder as our rhythm
And the sound of machine guns as our melody,
We are determined that Algeria should live,
So be our witness -be our witness -be our witness!

III
𝄆 O France, the time of reproof is over
And we have closed it as a book is closed; 𝄇
O France, this is the day of reckoning
So prepare to receive from us our answer!
In our revolution is the end of empty talk;
We are determined that Algeria should live,
So be our witness -be our witness -be our witness!

IV
𝄆 From our heroes we shall make an army come to being,
From our dead we shall build up a glory, 𝄇
Our spirits shall ascend to immortality
And on our shoulders we shall raise the Standard.
To the nation's Liberation Front we have sworn an oath,
We are determined that Algeria should live,
So be our witness -be our witness -be our witness!

V
𝄆 The cry of the motherland sounds from the battlefields.
Listen to it and answer the call! 𝄇
Let it be written with the blood of martyrs
And be read to future generations.
Oh, Glory, we have held out our hand to you,
We are determined that Algeria should live,
So be our witness -be our witness -be our witness!

== Legal protection ==
Even though "Kassaman" was adopted in 1962, it was not until November 2008 that an amendment to Article 5 of the Constitution of Algeria was made declaring it as "immutable", given its association with the country's revolution. It also confirmed that the national anthem comprises all of the song's verses, thus ending the deliberation over whether it was still appropriate to include the unfavourable reference to France in the present day.
