= Paula Delsol =

French Film Director

Paula Delsol, or Paule Delsol, was born on October 6, 1923, in Montagnac, Hérault, France, died on June 12, 2015, at Sèvres (Hauts-de-Seine) and is buried at Père Lachaise Cemetery. She was a French feature film director, documentarian, screenwriter, novelist, and also made contributions to French television. Her contributions to the iconic French New Wave are only rarely acknowledged; alongside Agnès Varda, Delsol was one of only two women practitioners in the movement. She was married to Jean Malige.

In 1955, Paula Delsol published an autobiographical novel Adieu et merci, inspired by her youth in Haiphong. From 1958, she made short films with her husband Jean Malige, cameraman and chief operator. She shot her first feature film in 1962, La Dérive - which was not released in theaters until 1964. Due to its themes of female sexual freedom and the over 18 theatrical restriction on the film, it was not a financial success at its time of release.

She left Montpellier for Paris in 1965. She released her second feature film Ben et Bénédict in 1977 (interpreted by Françoise Lebrun, André Dussollier and Daniel Duval). She then made short films for the FR3 channel, as well as a television film (Un homme comblé) in 1985.

Her work is archived in the Centre national du cinéma et de l'image animée (CNC), the television and radio archives Inathèque and the Bibliothèque nationale de France (BNF), as well as the Cinémathèque Française. Female director Michka Gorki began shooting a documentary about Delsol in the late 1970s which remains unfinished.

La Dérive is #25 on Richard Brody's "The Greatest Independent Films of the Twentieth Century" list in The New Yorker.

== Filmography ==
- 1994 Adieu et merci Tonkin (documentary; co-director with Bernard Malige)
- 1993 Augusta, Television
- 1985 Un Homme Comble, Director/Screenwriter, Television
- 1976 Ben et Bénédict, Director
- 1963 Une Fille a la Derive, Director
- 1962 La Dérive, Director
- 1959 Chaleurs D'Été, Screenplay/adaptation/dialogue
- 1955 Glamador, Assistant Director

== Novels ==
- 1959 Pourquoi j'aime
- 1955 Adieu et merci
