= Mohamed Fawzi (singer) =

Egyptian singer, actor and composer (1918–1966)

Mohamed Fawzi ON OME ORE
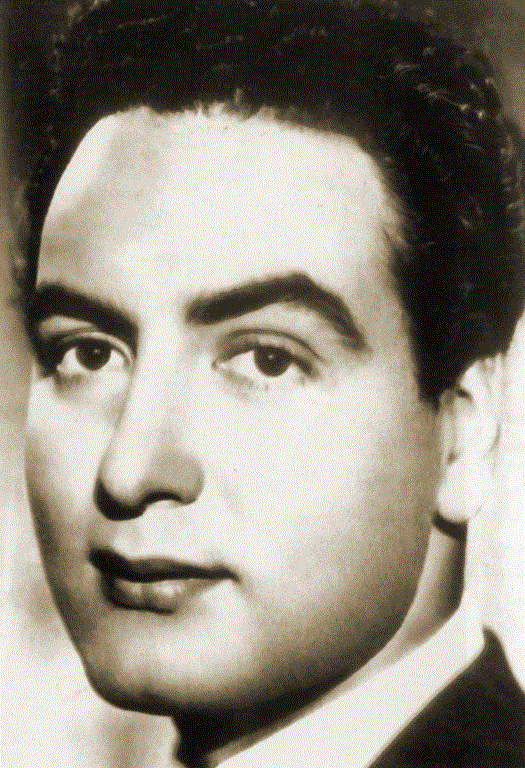
- with a mandolin

Background information
- Born: August 19, 1918; Qutur, Egypt
- Origin: Egypt
- Died: October 20, 1966 (aged 48) Cairo, Egypt
- Genres: Egyptian music, Tarab
- Occupations: Singer; actor
- Instruments: Vocals; oud
- Years active: 1933–1966
- Label: Sono Cairo

Mohamed Fawzi (also Mohamed Fawzi) (Arabic: محمد فوزي) was an Egyptian singer, composer, and film actor.

Fawzi reigned supreme in Egyptian musical and revue films throughout the 1940s and 1950s. His artistic style was characterized by simplicity and joy, and he also possessed a talent for managing finances, business, and artistic production. Mohamed Fawzi composed the melody for the Algerian national anthem, "Qassaman", with lyrics by the Algerian revolutionary poet Mufdi Zakaria.

== About his life ==
Mohamed Fawzi was born in the village of Kafr Abu Gundi, in the Qutur district of Gharbia Governorate. He was the twenty-first of twenty-five children, including the singers Huda Sultan and Hind Allam. Fawzi received his primary education at Tanta School in 1931. He was drawn to music and singing from a young age, learning the fundamentals of music from Mohamed El-Kharbatli, a firefighter and friend of his father, who used to take him along to sing at religious festivals, celebrations, and weddings. Fawzi was influenced by the songs of Mohamed Abdel Wahab and Umm Kulthum, and he would perform their songs for people in the Montazah Gardens and at the city's celebrations of the Mawlid of Sayyid al-Badawi.

After completing his preparatory education, he enrolled in the Fouad I Institute of Music in Cairo. He left his studies after two years to work at the nightclub owned by the sisters Ratiba and Insaf Rushdi. Later, Badia Masabni lured him to work at her establishment, where he met Farid al-Atrash, Mohamed Abdel-Mottaleb, and composer Mahmoud El-Sherif. He formed a close friendship with them, composing and performing sketches and revues, which later proved beneficial to his film career. At the age of twenty, Fawzi auditioned for the radio as both a singer and composer, following in the footsteps of Farid al-Atrash, who had done so two years prior. Fawzi failed as a singer but succeeded as a composer, emulating the success of Mahmoud El-Sherif.

== The beginning of his artistic career ==
After arriving in Cairo in 1938, Fawzi began working with Badia Masabni's troupe, then Fatima Rushdi's troupe, and finally the National Theatre Troupe.

Singing was Mohamed Fawzi's passion, so he decided to revive the works of Sayed Darwish as a springboard to performing his own compositions. His opportunity arose when the Egyptian Acting and Music Troupe contracted him as an actor and singer in Sayed Darwish's play Scheherazade; his failure in the role left him disheartened, especially in front of an unforgiving audience. He withdrew from the scene for a while until actress Fatima Rushdi, who admired him and believed in his talent, offered him a position in her troupe as an actor, composer, and singer. He gratefully accepted her offer. In 1944, Youssef Wahbi asked him to play a small role in the film The Executioner's Sword, in which he would sing two songs composed by Wahbi. A stipulation from Wahbi was that Fawzi be credited simply as "Mohamed Fawzi," to which Fawzi agreed without hesitation.

Director Mohamed Karim saw The Executioner's Sword and was looking for a new face to play the lead role in his film The Happy Ones opposite Suleiman Naguib and the singer Raja Abdo. He found what he was looking for in Mohamed Fawzi, but required that he undergo cosmetic surgery to correct his slightly flat upper lip. Fawzi complied, and later discovered that Mohamed Karim had been right. His success in The Happy Ones helped him establish his own film company, Mohamed Fawzi Films, in 1947.

Egyptian radio, which had rejected him as a singer, continued to broadcast his film songs without ever considering signing him. After the July 1952 revolution, radio began to play his patriotic songs, such as "My Country, I Loved You, My Country," and religious songs like "O Oft-Returning, O Forgiving," and "My God, How Just You Are." He also sang children's songs such as "Mama's Coming Soon" and "The Night Has Gone," which he performed in the film "Miracle of Heaven." Fawzi also participated with Madiha Yousri, Emad Hamdi, Shadia, Farid Shawqi, and Huda Sultan in the "Mercy Train" trips, which the revolution ordered to run in 1953 between the governorates of Lower and Upper Egypt. He and other artists performed to comfort patients in hospitals and social welfare centers.

Fawzi sang many songs he composed for films. He also composed for many singers of his era, such as Mohamed Abdel-Mottaleb, Laila Mourad, Nazik, Huda Sultan, Najah Salam, and many others.

=== The Algerian National Anthem ===
In 1956, two Algerian officials traveled to Egypt to meet with Mohamed Fawzi at the Voice of the Arabs radio station and ask him to compose the Algerian national anthem. However, Mohamed Abu al-Futuh, head of the Moroccan section at the station, objected to Fawzi, deeming him a weak composer unsuitable for the task. Fawzi took this as a slight against his abilities and talent and presented the work "Kassaman," the Algerian national anthem that remains in use to this day.

=== Founding and Nationalization of the Masrafon Company ===
In 1958, Fawzi was able to establish the Masrafon Company for record production. His company sold records for thirty-five piasters, undercutting foreign record companies that were selling records for ninety piasters. His Masrafon company produced songs by the leading singers of that era, such as Umm Kulthum and Mohamed Abdel Wahab.

The success of Fawzi's company and the quality of its production led the government to nationalize it in 1961 and appoint him as its director with a salary of 100 Egyptian pounds. Ahmed Al-Samahi stated: "Nationalization was the reason for Fawzi's downfall. After being the owner and backbone of the company, which was his whole life, his work there began to shrink. Then one day, he went to the company and found someone at the door saying, 'We will give you a monthly salary of one hundred pounds, and you will have an office there and be the head of the company.' But he found his office in the room that had been a tea and coffee shop.

Fawzi suffered from an illness that baffled doctors worldwide. He decided to travel abroad for treatment and indeed went to London in early 1965. He then returned to Egypt, but visited doctors in Germany two months later. However, the German hospital issued a statement saying that they had not been able to determine his true illness or how to treat it, and that he was the fifth person in the world to be afflicted with this disease, which had reduced his weight to 36 kilograms. The disease is now known as retroperitoneal fibrosis, sometimes referred to as "Fawzy's disease," as the German doctor named it after Mohamed Fawzy. Thus, Mohamed Fawzi entered a long and arduous battle with illness that ultimately claimed his life, until he passed away on October 20, 1966.

== Personal life ==
Mohamed Fawzi married his first wife, Huda, in 1943. They had three children: Nabil (born 1944), Samir (born 1946), and Munir (born 1948), before divorcing in 1952. Later that same year, he married the actress Madiha Yousri, with whom he had a son, Amr (born 1955). Two of his sons with Madiha Yousri predeceased him. They divorced in 1959. In 1960, he married his third wife, Karima (actress), and they had their daughter, Iman, in 1961. She remained with him until his death.

== Works and artistic legacy ==
Mohamed Fawzi's repertoire included 400 songs, approximately 300 of which were featured in films. Among his most famous songs are "Habibi wa Ainih" (My Beloved and His Eyes), "Shahhat al-Gharam" (The Beggar of Love), "Tamally fi Qalbi" (Always in My Heart), "Wahashouna al-Habayeb" (We Miss Our Loved Ones), "Elli Yehwak Ahwah" (I Love the One Who Loves You), and "Mal al-Qamar Malo" (What's Wrong with the Moon?).

He also composed a collection of beloved children's songs, including "Mama Zamanha Gaya" (Mama's Coming Soon) and "Dahab al-Layl Tala' al-Fajr" (The Night Has Gone, Dawn Has Come). Fawzi wrote the famous patriotic song "Baladi Ahbabtak Ya Baladi" (My Country, I Loved You, My Country), and songs for special occasions such as "Hatou al-Fawanees Ya Awlad" (Bring the Lanterns, Children) for Ramadan and "Enti Ya Ummi" (You, My Mother) for Mother's Day. He also composed a unique melody called "Mustafa Ya Mustafa" (Mustafa, Oh Mustafa), which became an icon in world music and has been used in numerous international songs.

Mohamed Fawzi acted in 36 films (in addition to his appearance in the 1939 film Cairo Nights), making him arguably the most prolific male actor among singers. He also allowed other composers to compose music in the films he starred in (such as Kiss Me, My Father, Nargis, The City's Revolution, and Layla, the Beach Girl), while Mohamed Abdel Wahab and Farid al-Atrash each composed all the songs in their respective films.

| Film Title | Release Date | Director |
|---|---|---|
| The Executioner's Sword | October 1944 | Youssef Wahbi |
| A Kiss in Lebanon | January 1945 | Ahmed Badrakhan |
| The Happy Ones | April 1946 | Mohamed Karim |
| Tears and Glory | March 1946 | Ahmed Badrakhan |
| The Enemy of Women | 16 December 1946 | Abdel Fattah Hassan |
| Kiss Me, Dad | 8 September 1947 | Ahmed Badrakhan |
| The Mermaid | 27 September 1947 | Abbas Kamel |
| Good Morning | 1 December 1947 | Hussein Fawzi |
| The Mind on Vacation | 12 May 1947 | Helmy Rafla |
| The Landlady | 18 March 1948 | Abdel Fattah Hassan |
| Love and Madness | 29 March 1948 | Helmy Rafla |
| Narges | 15 May 1948 | Abdel Fattah Hassan |
| The Soul and the Body | 4 October 1948 | Helmy Rafla |
| Lucky Girl | 1 November 1948 | Abdel Fattah Hassan |
| The Woman Is a Devil | 28 February 1949 | Abdel Fattah Hassan |
| The Madwoman | 31 January 1949 | Helmy Rafla |
| Fatima, Marika and Rachel | 25 July 1949 | Helmy Rafla |
| The Penny Owner | 26 September 1949 | Ezz El-Din Zulfikar |
| The Girl from Paris | 3 April 1950 | Helmy Rafla |
| Ah Men El Regala | 2 June 1950 | Helmy Rafla |
| Gharam Raqisa | 18 September 1950 | Helmy Rafla |
| The Seventh Wife | 10 April 1950 | Ibrahim Amara |
| Miss Mama | 10 July 1950 | Helmy Rafla |
| Love in Danger | 2 July 1951 | Helmy Rafla |
| The End of a Story | 3 September 1951 | Helmy Rafla |
| The Rose of Love | 10 December 1951 | Henry Barakat |
| Where Did You Get This | 9 June 1952 | Niazi Mustafa |
| The Sweetness of Love | 29 October 1952 | Director: Hussein Fawzi |
| Son for Rent | 13 September 1953 | Helmy Rafla |
| Doer of Good | 21 March 1953 | Helmy Rafla |
| Always with You | 2 August 1954 | Henry Barakat |
| Daughters of Eve | 1 March 1954 | Niazi Mustafa |
| A City in Revolt | 30 October 1955 | Helmy Rafla |
| Miracle of Heaven | 19 March 1956 | Atef Salem |
| Layla Bint Al-Shati’ | 12 January 1959 | Hussein Fawzi |
| Every Beat of My Heart | 9 February 1959 | Ahmed Diaa El-Din |

=== Films of Mohamed Fawzi ===
Mohamed Fawzi produced a number of films between 1947 and 1959, all of which he starred in except for the films Futuwat Al-Husayniya and Al-Gha'iba (The Absent One).

| Year | Works |
|---|---|
| 1947 | Mind on Vacation |
| 1948 | Love and Madness • Soul and Body |
| 1949 | The Madwoman • Fatima, Marika and Rachel • The Pennywise Woman |
| 1950 | A Dancer's Love • Miss Mama |
| 1951 | The End of a Story • The Rose of Love |
| 1952 | Where Did You Get This? |
| 1953 | A Good Samaritan |
| 1954 | The Tough Guys of Al-Husayniya • Always With You • Daughters of Eve |
| 1955 | The Absent One |
| 1956 | Miracle in Heaven |
| 1959 | Every Beat of My Heart |
