= Éric Berger =

French actor (born 1969)

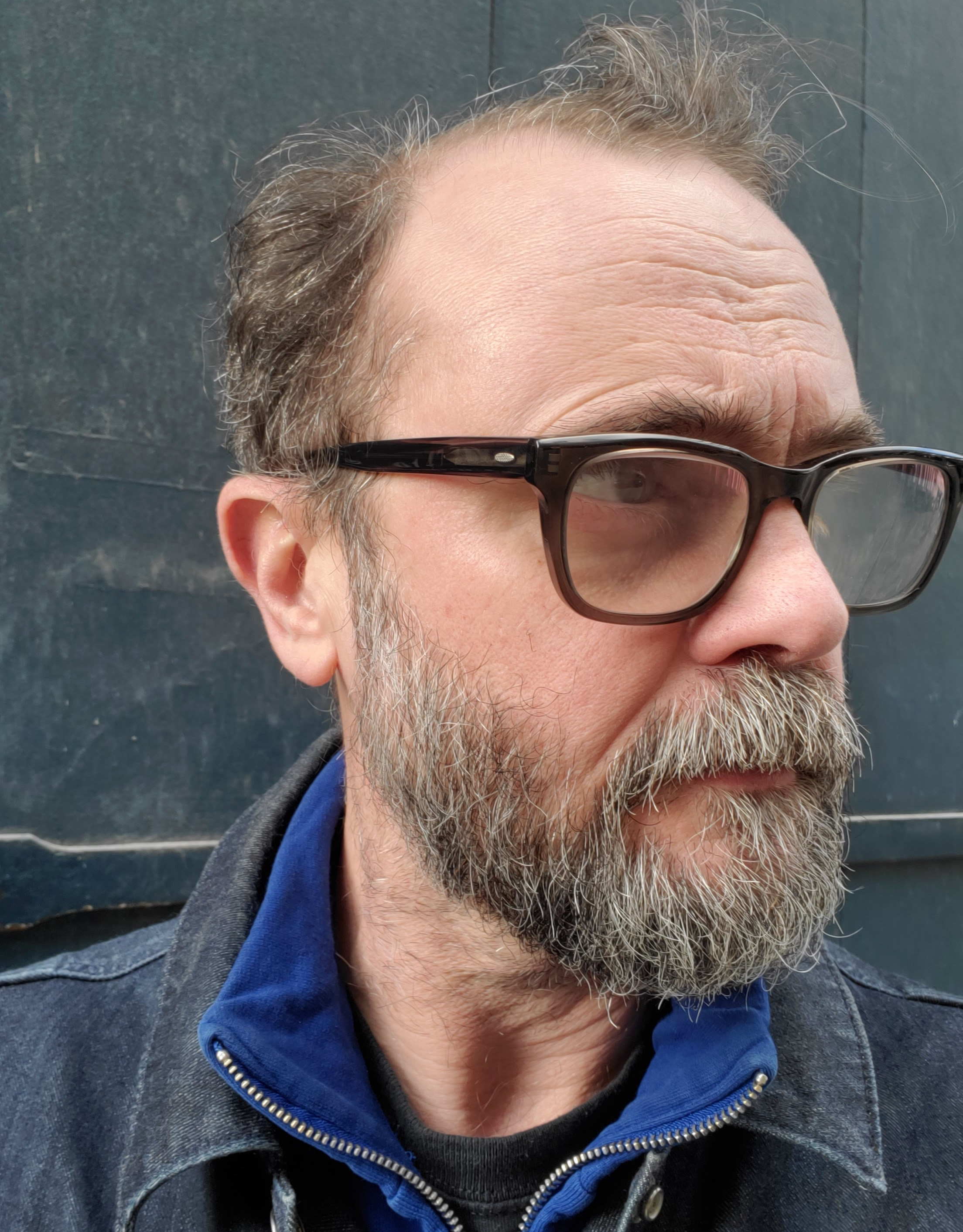
- Eric Berger in 2016.
- Born: 13 June 1969 (age 56); Amiens, France
- Occupation: Actor
- Years active: 1991-present

Éric Berger (born 13 June 1969) is a French actor. He has appeared in more than forty films since 1991.

== Selected filmography ==
Year	Title	Role	Notes
2001	Tanguy	Tanguy Guetz	
2004	The Story of My Life	Jeff	
2012	My Worst Nightmare	Sebastien	
2016	Ma famille t'adore déjà	Lambert	
