= Cédric Kahn =

French film director

- Kahn in 2026
- Born: 17 June 1966 (age 60); Crest, Drôme, France
- Occupations: Filmmaker, actor
- Years active: 1990–present

Cédric Kahn (French: [kan]; born 17 June 1966) is a French filmmaker, screenwriter and actor. Most known for his drama films Roberto Succo (2001), The Prayer (2018), and The Goldman Case (2023).

== Early life ==
Born to an architect father and a pharmacist mother, Kahn grew up in the Drôme region. Showing little interest in traditional schooling, he developed a keen passion for cinema during his teenage years, hosting a film-review radio show with fellow students from his high school in Crest. He moved to Paris immediately after graduating from high school and, within a few years, managed to carve out a place for himself in the film industry.

== Career ==
He began working in the French film industry as an assistant to film editor Yann Dedet on Maurice Pialat's Under the Sun of Satan, which won the Palme d'Or at the 1987 Cannes Film Festival.

His films include L'Ennui (1998), based on the Alberto Moravia novel Boredom, and Red Lights (2004), based on the Georges Simenon novel. His film Roberto Succo was entered into the 2001 Cannes Film Festival.

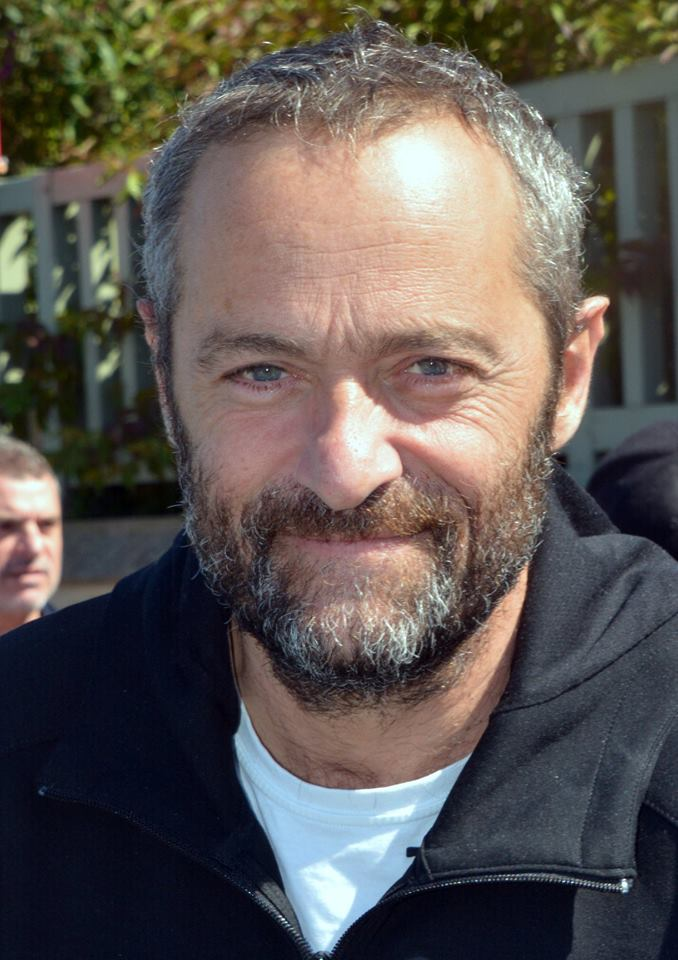
Kahn in 2018

== Personal life ==
=== Political views ===
In December 2023, alongside 50 other filmmakers, Kahn signed an open letter published in Libération demanding a ceasefire and an end to the killing of civilians amid the 2023 Israeli invasion of the Gaza Strip, and for a humanitarian corridor into Gaza to be established for humanitarian aid, and the release of hostages.

== Filmography ==
=== As filmmaker ===
Year	English Title	Original Title	Notes
1990	Les Dernières Heures du millénaire		Short film
1991	Bar des rails		
1994	Too Much Happiness	Trop de bonheur	1994 Cannes Film Festival - Award of the Youth; Prix Jean Vigo
1996	Zero Guilt		TV film
1998	Boredom	L'Ennui	Louis Delluc Prize for Best Film
2001	Roberto Succo		Nominated—2001 Cannes Film Festival - Palme d'Or
2004	Red Lights	Feux rouges	Nominated—54th Berlin International Film Festival - Golden Bear; Nominated—Independent Spirit Award for Best Foreign Film
2005	L'Avion		
2009	Regrets	Les Regrets	
2011	A Better Life	Une vie meilleure	
2014	Wild Life	Vie sauvage	San Sebastián International Film Festival - Special Jury Prize; Nominated—Lumière Award for Best Director
2018	The Prayer	La prière	
2019	Happy Birthday	Fête de famille	
2023	The Goldman Case	Le Procès Goldman	Nominated—Lumière Award for Best Director
2023	Making Of		
2026	A Place to Heal	15/18	

=== Only screenwriter ===
Year	Title	Notes
1990	Overseas	Bayard d'Or for Best Screenplay
1993	Normal People Are Nothing Exceptional	
2006	Les Ambitieux	

=== As actor ===
Year	Title	Role
1995	Don't Forget You're Going to Die	Benoit's Friend
2012	Alyah	Isaac Raphaelson
2013	Miss and the Doctors	Boris Pizarnik
2015	The Anarchists	Gaspard
2016	L'Economie du couple	Boris
2016	Up for Love	Bruno
2018	Maya	
2018	Cold War	Michel
2022	Neneh Superstar	Jean-Claude Kahane

=== As editor ===
- 1993: L'Exposé
