= Duran Duboi =

French visual effects company

- Industry: Film; Video games
- Founded: 1983
- Founder: Bernard Maltaverne; Pascal Hérold
- Headquarters: Joinville-le-Pont, France
- Products: Special effects for television and film Video games
- Parent: Technicolor

Duran Duboi is a French company, a subsidiary of the Quinta Industries group, primarily involved in developing special effects for the film industry. It was founded in 1983 by Bernard Maltaverne and Pascal Hérold. They also develop special effects for advertising and television.

The company has also developed video games in the past, notably the Virtual Skipper series.

Quinta Industries entered forced liquidation at the end of 2011, having already been in reorganization for a year. Duran Duboi remained in operation until January 4, 2012, with the deadline for submitting company recovery files being December 15, 2011.

In December 2011, the California subsidiary of the studio called Duran Duboi U.S. was repurchased by the American company FilmFunds. It also made an offer to recover the Duran Duboi group. Duboi was eventually acquired by Technicolor through the purchase of Quinta Industries assets, produced on February 3, 2012.
