= The Girl from Paris (1950 film) =

1950 film directed by Helmy Rafla

The Girl from Paris (Arabic: بنت باريز, translit. Bint Bariz) is an Egyptian film released in 1950. It was directed by Helmy Rafla and used a screenplay by Abo El Seoud El Ebiary. Bruno Salvi was the cinematographer. The film stars Taheyya Kariokka as an Egyptian girl who masquerades as a Parisian dancer in order to help a musician (portrayed by Mohamed Fawzi) fulfill his promised contract at a theatre.
