= Tetsuo Nagata =

Japanese cinematographer based in France (born 1952)

- Born: 1952 (age 73–74); Nakano, Nagano, Japan
- Years active: 1985–present

Tetsuo Nagata (永田 鉄男, Nagata Tetsuo; born 1952 in Nakano, Nagano, Japan) is a Japanese-born French cinematographer.

== Filmography ==
Short film

Year	Title	Director	Notes
1992	Faut pas rêver	Michel Thibaud	
1998	Le Dernier Chaperon rouge	Jan Kounen	
2006	Quartier de la Madeleine	Vincenzo Natali	Segment of Paris, je t'aime
2017	Inseparable	Steve Duchesne	

Feature film

Year	Title	Director
1999	C'est quoi la vie?	François Dupeyron
2000	Stand-by	Roch Stéphanik
2001	The Officers' Ward	François Dupeyron
2002	Steal	Gérard Pirès
2003	Leave Your Hands on My Hips	Chantal Lauby
2004	Blueberry	Jan Kounen
2004	Narco	Tristan Aurouet; Gilles Lellouche
2005	Animal	Roselyne Bosch
2005	Until The Lights Come Back	Takashi Minamoto
2007	La Vie en Rose	Olivier Dahan
2009	Micmacs	Jean-Pierre Jeunet
2009	Splice	Vincenzo Natali
2010	Leonie	Hisako Matsui
2012	Russian Disco	Oliver Ziegenbalg
2015	125 Years Memory	Mitsutoshi Tanaka
2022	Dhaakad	Razneesh Ghai (Razy)
2025	Emergency	Kangana Ranaut
2025	120 Bahadur	Razneesh Ghai (Razy)

== Awards and nominations ==
Year	Award	Category	Title	Result
2001	César Awards	Best Cinematography	The Officers' Ward	Won
2007	César Awards	Best Cinematography	La Vie en rose	Won
2015	Japan Academy Film Prize	Outstanding Achievement in Cinematography	125 Years Memory	Nominated
