= The Passenger (2005 Éric Caravaca film) =

- French: Le passager
- Directed by: Éric Caravaca
- Starring: Éric Caravaca; Julie Depardieu
- Release date: 1 December 2005 (EBFF)
- Running time: 85 minutes
- Country: France
- Language: French

The Passenger (French: Le passager) is a 2005 French drama film directed by Éric Caravaca.

== Cast ==
- Éric Caravaca - Thomas
- Julie Depardieu - Jeanne
- Vincent Rottiers - Lucas
- Maurice Bénichou - Joseph
- Maurice Garrel - Gilbert
- Nathalie Richard - Suzanne
- Rémi Martin - Richard
- Thibaut Corrion - Richard jeune
