= Roberto Succo (film) =

2001 film by Cédric Kahn

- Film poster
- Directed by: Cédric Kahn
- Screenplay by: Cédric Kahn
- Based on: Je te tue. Histoire vraie de Roberto Succo, assassin sans raison by Pascale Froment
- Produced by: Ruth Waldburger
- Starring: Stefano Cassetti
- Cinematography: Pascal Marti
- Edited by: Yann Dedet
- Music by: Julien Civange
- Distributed by: Diaphana Films
- Release date: 14 May 2001
- Running time: 124 minutes
- Country: France
- Language: French

Roberto Succo is a 2001 French film directed by Cédric Kahn and based on the true story of the eponymous Italian serial killer Roberto Succo. The film was adapted from the book Je te tue. Histoire vraie de Roberto Succo assassin sans raison by Pascale Froment. The film was entered into the 2001 Cannes Film Festival.

== Plot ==
A film based on the true story of a notorious Italian criminal. Roberto Succo was a psychiatric patient who murdered his parents and embarked on a crime spree across Europe in the 1980s. He committed multiple violent crimes, including armed robberies, kidnappings, and murders, and evaded capture across several countries, including France, Italy, and Switzerland.

In the film, Kurt who is actually Roberto Succo, forms a relationship with a young girl, Léa, in the south of France. As his criminal activities escalate, the police struggle to track him down, not realizing the extent of his dangerous behavior until Léa provides key information, helping the authorities link him to the series of crimes and his true identity.

== Cast ==
- Stefano Cassetti as Roberto Succo
- Isild Le Besco as Léa
- Patrick Dell'Isola as Thomas
- Viviana Aliberti as Swiss teacher
- Estelle Perron as Céline
- Leyla Sassi as Cathy
- Catherine Decastel as Patricia
- Olivia Carbonini as Girl at the Etna
- Basile Vuillemin as L'enfant
- Brigitte Raul as Child's mother
- Marius Bertram as Cab driver
- Aymeric Chauffert as Aelaunay
- Vincent Dénériaz as Denis
- Yelda Reynaud as Mylène
- Philippe Bossard as Magistrate
