= The Officers' Ward (film) =

2001 film by François Dupeyron

- DVD cover
- Directed by: François Dupeyron
- Written by: François Dupeyron; Marc Dugain
- Produced by: Laurent Pétin; Michèle Pétin
- Starring: Eric Caravaca
- Cinematography: Tetsuo Nagata
- Edited by: Dominique Faysse
- Music by: Jean-Michel Bernard
- Distributed by: ARP Sélection
- Release date: 18 May 2001
- Running time: 135 minutes
- Country: France
- Language: French
- Budget: $8.7 million
- Box office: $2.9 million

The Officers' Ward (French: La Chambre des officiers) is a 2001 French film directed by François Dupeyron and starring Eric Caravaca as the central character. It was based on the novel by Marc Dugain, which in turn was based on the experiences of one of the author's own ancestors during World War I. The film received nine nominations at the 27th César Awards, winning Best Supporting Actor for André Dussollier and Best Cinematography for Tetsuo Nagata.

== Plot ==
The film concentrates more on the period spent in hospital than the novel, and emphasizes the horror of the friends' injuries. On Adrien's arrival at the ward, all the mirrors are removed and staff are instructed not to give him one, but we see from the faces of others how bad the damage is. Adrien becomes increasingly desperate to see the damage done to his face, even asking a visitor to draw him. Dupeyron ensures that we do not see the horrifying extent of Adrien's injuries until he does—by seeing his reflection in a window.

There is a focus on the fleeting romance between Adrien and Clémence, whom he met by chance shortly before the war, and his attempts to find her. When he finally does, she fails to recognise him.

Whereas the novel follows the experiences of the group right up to World War II and beyond, the film ends just after the First World War, the final scene being Adrien's chance meeting with his future wife.

== Cast ==
- Eric Caravaca : Adrien
- Denis Podalydès : Henri
- Grégori Derangère : Pierre
- Sabine Azéma : Anaïs
- André Dussollier : The surgeon
- Isabelle Renauld : Marguerite
- Géraldine Pailhas : Clémence
- Jean-Michel Portal : Alain
- Xavier De Guillebon : Louis
- Elise Tielrooy : Nurse Cécile
- Catherine Arditi : Adrien's mother
- Paul Le Person : Adrien's grandfather
- Annie Mercier : Brothel madame

== Awards and nominations ==
- Cannes Film Festival (France)
  - Nominated: Golden Palm (François Dupeyron)
- César Awards (France)
  - Won: Best Cinematography (Tetsuo Nagata)
  - Won: Best Actor – Supporting Role (André Dussollier)
  - Nominated: Best Actor – Leading Role (Eric Caravaca)
  - Nominated: Best Costume Design (Catherine Bouchard)
  - Nominated: Best Director (François Dupeyron)
  - Nominated: Best Film
  - Nominated: Best Original Screenplay or Adaptation (François Dupeyron)
  - Nominated: Most Promising Actor (Grégori Derangère and Jean-Michel Portal)
