= My Wife Is an Actress =

2001 film by Yvan Attal

My Wife is an Actress
- Film poster
- Directed by: Yvan Attal
- Written by: Yvan Attal
- Produced by: Claude Berri
- Starring: Yvan Attal; Charlotte Gainsbourg; Terence Stamp
- Cinematography: Rémy Chevrin
- Edited by: Jennifer Augé
- Music by: Brad Mehldau
- Production companies: Katharina; Renn Productions; TF1 Films Production
- Distributed by: Pathé
- Release dates: 12 September 2001 (TIFF); 14 November 2001 (France)
- Running time: 95 minutes
- Country: France
- Languages: French; English
- Budget: $6.4 million
- Box office: $5.2 million

My Wife is an Actress (French: Ma femme est une actrice) is a 2001 French romantic comedy-drama film starring Yvan Attal and Charlotte Gainsbourg. Attal plays a journalist who becomes obsessively jealous when his actress wife gets a part in a movie with an attractive co-star. Attal also wrote and directed the film. The film stars Terence Stamp among others. This film is also highly biographic, as Yvan and Charlotte are a real-life couple since 1991, and have three children. According to Yvan, the idea and a part of the plot originates from real-life events.

== Cast ==
- Charlotte Gainsbourg as Charlotte
- Yvan Attal as Yvan
- Terence Stamp as John
- Noémie Lvovsky as Nathalie
- Laurent Bateau as Vincent
- Keith Allen as David
- Ludivine Sagnier as Géraldine
- Lionel Abelanski as Georges
- Marie Denarnaud as Colette
- Gilles Lellouche as The policeman
- Eriq Ebouaney as The Club bouncer
- Ben Attal as little boy

== Reception ==
The film was released on 14 November 2001 in France on 238 screens and opened at number one with a gross of 7 million Francs ($1 million) for the week. It went on to gross $3.4 million in France. It opened on 12 July 2002 in 7 theatres in the United States and grossed $49,204 in the opening weekend and went on to gross $1,121,233. It grossed $5,169,438 worldwide.

On review aggregator website Rotten Tomatoes, the film holds an approval rating of 65% based on 72 reviews, with an average rating of 6.4/10.
