= Pitof =

French visual effects supervisor and director

- Born: Jean-Christophe Comar
- Occupations: Visual effects director, producer, screenwriter
- Years active: 1976–present

Jean-Christophe "Pitof" Comar is a French visual effects supervisor and director notable for Vidocq and Catwoman.

== Career ==
Pitof began his career in the film industry in 1976 as an assistant director, still photographer and film editor. He then branched out into musical scoring, software design and graphic design for televisions, music videos and commercials. Co-founder of Duran Duboi, a digital postproduction company, Pitof worked on commercials, videos and feature films.

In 1997, Pitof took on the role of second unit director for Jean-Pierre Jeunet's Alien: Resurrection. It was Pitof's third collaboration with Jeunet after working together on the Jeunet-Caro films Delicatessen and The City of Lost Children.

in 2000 Pitof made his directorial debut with the film, Vidocq a period thriller starring Gerard Depardieu and Guillaume Canet, premiered in France in September 2001. It is notable as being the first major fantasy film to be released (one year before Star Wars: Episode II - Attack of the Clones) was shot entirely with digital cinematography, using a Sony HDW-F900 CineAlta camera.

In 2004, Pitof made his English-language debut with the Hollywood film Catwoman, starring Halle Berry and Sharon Stone. The film was critically panned, and is considered one of the worst movies of all time. Pitof was awarded the Razzie Award for Worst Director for the film. In 2024 Pitof openly explained the many issues behind Catwoman and the exclusion of the Batman character.

Pitof was set to direct the US-Chinese co-production Empires of the Deep although he eventually dropped out.

In 2019 Pitof co-founded 6th Sense VR, a company developing, producing and distributing VR content.

== Filmography ==
Director

- Vidocq (2001)
- Catwoman (2004)
- Fire and Ice: The Dragon Chronicles (2008) (TV movie)

Writer

- Vidocq (2001)
- Le pistolet (2003)

Second unit director

- Alien Resurrection (1997)

Producer

- Closer Apart (2012)
- The Activist (2014)
- Hacker's Game (2015)
- Make Note on Every Sound (2015)
- Broken Angels (2015)
- NY 84 (2016)
- Connected (2016)
- One World (2016)
- In My Mother's Arms (2017)
- Day Driver (2018)
- Venus (2018)
- All You Need is Me (2018)
- The Sacrifice Zone (2022)

Visual effects supervisor

- Delicatessen (1991)
- Le Bal des casse-pieds (1992)
- My Name is Victor (1993)
- Metisse (1993)
- Fanfan & Alexandre (1993)
- The Thirst for Gold (1993)
- The Visitors (1993)
- Cash-Cash (1994)
- Montparnasse Pondichery (1994)
- Giorgino (1994)
- Blue Helmet (1994)
- The Daughter of d'Artagnan (1994)
- Dead Tired (1994)
- Ma Femme me Quitte (1995)
- Happiness is in the Field (1995)
- The City of Lost Children (1995)
- Fallait pas (1996)
- Beaumarchais (1996)
- Fantome avec Chauffeur (1996)
- Didier (1997)
- Alien Resurrection (1997)
- The Messenger: The Story of Joan of Arc (1999)
- Asterix and Obelix vs. Caesar (1999)
