= Vidocq (2001 film) =

2001 French mystery film

- Theatrical poster
- Directed by: Pitof
- Written by: Pitof; Jean-Christophe Grangé
- Based on: The memoirs of Eugène François Vidocq
- Produced by: Dominique Farrugia
- Starring: Gérard Depardieu; Guillaume Canet; Inés Sastre; André Dussollier
- Cinematography: Jean-Pierre Sauvaire; Jean-Claude Thibout
- Edited by: Thierry Hoss
- Music by: Bruno Coulais
- Distributed by: UGC Fox Distribution
- Release dates: September 19, 2001 (France); January 2, 2007 (United States)
- Running time: 98 minutes
- Country: France
- Language: French
- Budget: €23.2 million ($21 million)
- Box office: $13.2 million

Vidocq (North American DVD title: Dark Portals: The Chronicles of Vidocq) is a 2001 mystery film, directed by Pitof, starring Gérard Depardieu as historical figure Eugène François Vidocq pursuing a supernatural serial killer. The film's style has been likened to steampunk.

It is notable as being the first major fantasy film to be released that was shot entirely with digital cinematography, using a Sony HDW-F900 CineAlta camera. According to the Guinness World Records, Vidocq is the first full length feature filmed in digital high resolution.

== Plot ==
In 1830 Paris, private investigator Eugène Vidocq pursues the Alchemist, a man wearing a cowl and a mirrored mask. The Alchemist lures Vidocq into a furnace room at a glass factory, and during a fight, pushes him into the furnace. Hanging onto the ledge, Vidocq asks him to reveal his face. The Alchemist obliges, and Vidocq lets go, falling into the fire.

Journalist Étienne Boisset goes to Vidocq's colleague, René Nimier, asking for help writing Vidocq's biography. Boisset states that he plans to find Vidocq's murderer. Lautrennes, Paris's chief of police, asked Nimier and Vidocq to investigate the deaths of Belmont and Veraldi, the owners of a cannon factory. Lautrennes believed this had been an attempt to undermine the French military in an unstable political climate. Belmont and Veraldi had died in a lightning strike, but during the investigation, Vidocq and Nimier saw the powder on a factory worker's clothes catch fire. The servant responsible for maintaining Belmont's and Veraldi's suits confessed to having received a letter, with cash, ordering him not to clean their jackets. Realizing that the lightning would need to be attracted to the men, the investigators found metallic pins inserted into the victims' hats.

Lautrennes orders officer Tauzet to investigate Vidocq's death. Meanwhile, Boisset sneaks into Nimier's office and retrieves the pins. He traces the design to Preah, a dancer in a brothel, and Vidocq's lover. Vidocq also tracked down Preah, who had received a letter, with cash, asking her to put the pins in the hats. The letter included a third target – Ernest Lafitte, owner of an orphanage. Vidocq rushed to save Lafitte, but the Alchemist got there first. Vidocq pursued him, but the Alchemist managed to escape using seemingly magical powers.

Boisset's investigation leads him to Sylvia, the brothel manager; journalist Froissard, who is investigating the masked murderer; and Marine Lafitte, wife of Ernest. They reveal that Lafitte, Belmont and Veraldi were narcissists, committed to preventing death by aging. The Alchemist offered an elixir of eternal youth in return for their cooperation in capturing young maidens for his experiments. The three rich men went along, but later stopped cooperating due to a sense of guilt, so the Alchemist killed them. After Boisset leaves, the Alchemist arrives, killing Froissard and Marine. Tauzet notices that the Alchemist is disposing of witnesses, and fears Boisset is next.

Boisset sneaks in to retrieve Vidocq's notes, and encounters Lautrennes and Tauzet. Lautrennes attempts to arrest Boisset, who escapes. The notes reveal that Vidocq found a lab where the Alchemist was using the maidens' blood to create a substance for his mask, which grants eternal youth by sucking the souls out of his victims. The Alchemist arrived and attacked Vidocq, who took a piece from the former's mask before the killer escaped. Vidocq's final note states that the Alchemist would need someone to manufacture the mask, leading him to the glass factory.

Boisset, Nimier and Preah head to the factory, ushered by an artisan, and trailed by both Tauzet and Lautrennes. The artisan eventually removes his prosthetic, revealing himself to be Vidocq. Vidocq had actually jumped into a secret hole in the furnace wall, which he saw in the mask's reflection before the Alchemist revealed himself to be Boisset. Vidocq faked his own death to let Boisset's guard down, knowing the Alchemist would destroy all clues and witnesses through any means necessary.

With his cover blown, Boisset dons the Alchemist's mask. Nimier opens fire, but is killed as the Alchemist magically reflects the bullets back at him. Vidocq pursues the Alchemist into a hall of mirrors and forces him to look into a mirror shard, freeing the souls trapped inside the mask. Vidocq impales the Alchemist with a shard of mirror and throws him into a river. Although the others insist the Alchemist is dead, Vidocq is unnerved by the lack of a body.

At Nimier's funeral, as everyone walks away, the Alchemist's laugh can be heard in the distance, accompanied by the glimmer of his mirror mask.

== Cast ==
- Gérard Depardieu as Vidocq
- Guillaume Canet as Étienne Boisset
- Inés Sastre as Préah
- André Dussollier as Lautrennes
- Édith Scob as Sylvia
- Isabelle Renauld as Marine Lafitte
- Moussa Maaskri as Nimier
- Jean-Pierre Gos as Tauzet
- Jean-Pol Dubois as Belmont
- André Penvern as Veraldi
- Gilles Arbona as Lafitte
- Jean-Marc Thibault as Leviner
- François Chattot as Froissard

== Production ==
The film featured 800 shots modified in post-production over a period of eight months, at a cost of over €20 million. It was the first feature film to be shot in digital progressive HDTV at 24 fps cinematic framerate (1080p24), one year before Star Wars: Episode II – Attack of the Clones. A few short scenes, however, were shot using DV format (576i25) for artistic purposes. Only those special effects shots were deinterlaced by means of smart field blending (imitating a progressive-type amount of motion blur due to a different shutter speed of progressive modes) during post-production, as the special effects crew obviously was in demand of progressive frames which are easier to process. Normal shots were in no need of deinterlacing, thanks to progressive scan HD cameras. The result are video-like appearance of motions in DV shots, due to the different amount of motion blur resulting from the different deinterlacing methods, and distinctive film-like motions for the dominant 1080p24 shots otherwise.

The Finnish cello metal band Apocalyptica used clips from the film in the music video for their Cult track, "Hope Vol. 2" with Matthias Sayer of Farmer Boys providing extra recorded vocals, which served as the film's ending theme.

== Reception ==
The film did well at the French box-office, selling around two million tickets, but was poorly received by critics. Director Pitof later said that the film had been rejected by professionals because its style was too idiosyncratic for French cinema.

Variety said: "Vidocq suffers from the same inflated self-importance and almost arbitrary grandeur, whereby a halfway decent premise devolves into borderline idiocy." TV Guide wrote: "[...] the film's relentless look-at-me factor constitutes an assault on the senses, if not an entirely unpleasant one."

== See also ==
- Vidocq (1939)
- A Scandal in Paris (1946)
- The Emperor of Paris (2018)
