= Tanguy (film) =

2001 film by Étienne Chatiliez

- Directed by: Étienne Chatiliez
- Written by: Yolande Zauberman; Étienne Chatiliez; Laurent Chouchan
- Produced by: Charles Gassot
- Starring: Sabine Azéma; André Dussollier; Éric Berger
- Cinematography: Philippe Welt
- Edited by: Catherine Renault
- Music by: Pascal Andreacchio
- Production company: TF1 Films Production
- Distributed by: UGC Fox Distribution
- Release date: 21 November 2001
- Running time: 108 minutes
- Country: France
- Language: French
- Budget: $19.8 million
- Box office: $24.3 million

Tanguy [tɑ̃.ɡi] is a 2001 French black comedy by Étienne Chatiliez.

== Plot ==
At the birth of Tanguy (Éric Berger), her only son, Édith Guetz (Sabine Azéma) said to him: "You’re so cute, if you want, you can stay at home your whole life."

At 28 years old, Tanguy is still living with his parents. Now a Political Sciences grad student, a former student of ENS Ulm, a teacher at INALCO, working on a thesis about the emergence of the concept of subjectivity in ancient China, and fluent in Chinese and Japanese, he could fully support himself and leave the family nest. However, he persists in staying, loving his parents above all, whom he describes as "intelligent, open-minded, generous, who let me do whatever I enjoy."

Although they don’t show it to him, his parents, Paul (André Dussollier) and Édith, are increasingly annoyed at the idea of him staying at home, which he treats like a hotel, coming and going at any hour or bringing home one-night stands. This irritation increases further when Tanguy announces that he will delay his thesis by at least a year. Paul’s mother, Odile (Hélène Duc), predicts that "the Pekingese" will stay under their roof for many more years and blames their lack of firmness. Édith regularly consults a psychiatrist to explain her dreams of killing or mutilating her son.

The first technique the parents use is to try to make him dislike the house so he leaves of his own accord. They throw away or damage his clothes, the father secretly unscrews a bathroom threshold bar so he injures himself while walking barefoot, the mother hides spoiled food to make his room smell bad, and she takes over the room he uses as an office to force him to stay in his bedroom. Additionally, she makes as much noise as possible when he works or cuts the electricity unexpectedly when he’s writing his thesis on his computer. Tanguy doesn’t give up and, during a conversation with his grandmother, mentions his low opinion of living alone, comparing a recently settled friend’s sad life to what he considers his "daily happiness" with his parents.

Taking it further, Paul and Édith try to ruin his nights as well: Paul pretends to have insomnia and joins him in the middle of the night to chat. They interfere in his love life by making the women he brings home think he’s a Don Juan. Édith breaks up Tanguy and his girlfriend Marguerite without knowing they were seriously planning to live together. Far from being angry, Tanguy thanks his mother for helping him end a relationship that scared him given his ambitions in life.

Although he had always categorically refused, Paul finally agrees to pay for an apartment for Tanguy. After long discussions, he accepts and chooses a flat in an Asian neighborhood in the 13th arrondissement. The joy is short-lived for the parents because, apart from his incessant phone calls to stay in contact with them, each night he suffers from anxiety and panic attacks, ending up in the hospital. Taking pity on him, Édith agrees to take him back home.

Now showing a different side, Paul sets very strict house rules, which Tanguy calls "military discipline," governing their interactions at home, such as the obligation to tidy his room or the prohibition of talking back to his parents. Paul also finds a job for Tanguy tutoring a student preparing for entry to a prestigious school.

When his parents discover that, between his research grant, his teaching, and the private lessons he gives, Tanguy earns at least 25,000 francs a month (about 3,800 euros), they throw him out of the house. Tanguy takes them to court and wins, with his lawyer citing Article 203 of the Civil Code, which obliges parents to support their children.

Relations become explosive when Tanguy returns to the family home. Paul perpetually shouts at his son, who remains calm, countering with Chinese proverbs he knows. The parents decide to humiliate him by transforming his room into a nursery, replacing his bed with a cot and hanging a mobile above it. His mother disrupts his classes to ridicule him in front of his students, even participating as a student herself and eventually sleeping with one of them. Against his parents’ expectations, Tanguy is unfazed by these actions and forgives his mother without hesitation.

Just as Paul, at his wits’ end, hires some thugs to "beat up" his son, he learns that Tanguy has finally left the house, leaving behind a letter generously thanking his parents. Their joy is once again short-lived as Paul’s mother Odile falls in her bathroom and, needing months of rehabilitation, reminds them of Article 205 of the Civil Code, "the same as 203… but for the elderly."

Ten months later, Paul and Édith receive a letter from Tanguy inviting them to visit him in Beijing, where he has married a Chinese woman and is expecting a child. Observing that in this Chinese family both the parents and grandparents live under the same roof, Odile gets the last word, turning to Paul and saying she’s glad to see "people who take responsibility for their family, unlike some others."

== Cast ==
- Sabine Azéma: Edith Guetz
- André Dussollier: Paul Guetz
- Éric Berger: Tanguy Guetz
- Hélène Duc: Grandmother Odile
- Aurore Clément: Carole
- Jean-Paul Rouve: Bruno Lemoine
- André Wilms: the psychiatrist
- Richard Guedj: Patrick
- Roger Van Hool: Philippe
- Nathalie Krebs: Noëlle
- Delphine Serina: Sophie
- Sachi Kawamata: Kimiko
- Annelise Hesme: Marguerite
- Philippe Laudenbach: Lawyer Badinier
- Jacques Boudet: the judge

== Reception ==
The film opened at number one in France with a gross of 29 million Francs ($4.2 million). It went on to gross $21.4 million in France and $24.3 million worldwide.

== In popular culture ==
The word Tanguy became the usual term to designate an adult still living with his parents.
