= The Girl from Paris (2001 film) =

2001 French film by Christian Carion

- Film poster
- French: Une hirondelle a fait le printemps
- Directed by: Christian Carion
- Written by: Christian Carion; Éric Assous
- Produced by: Christophe Rossignon
- Starring: Michel Serrault; Mathilde Seigner
- Cinematography: Antoine Héberlé
- Edited by: Andrea Sedlácková
- Music by: Philippe Rombi
- Distributed by: Mars Distribution
- Release date: 5 September 2001
- Running time: 103 minutes
- Country: France
- Language: French
- Budget: $4.5 million
- Box office: $12.6 million

The Girl from Paris (French: Une hirondelle a fait le printemps) is a 2001 French film directed by Christian Carion.

== Plot ==
Sandrine (Mathilde Seigner) gets tired of her life as an IT instructor in Paris and decides to leave her work and dedicate her life to agriculture. She first goes to college where she earns her BTS in two years, undertaking internships along the way. She then wishes to buy an isolated farm in the Vercors from an old farmer called Adrien (Michel Serrault) who wishes to retire.

Sandrine brings a new approach to the farming enterprise incorporating her internet knowledgeability: she converts an unused cow barn into a bed and breakfast, invites busloads of school children in for day tours, and sells her goat cheese over the Internet. Over time Sandrine and Adrien navigate their way from prickly separatism to mutual respect and warmth. The film ends with a shot of her leading her goats along the usual route, suggesting she has successfully addressed all those initial challenges.

== Cast ==
- Michel Serrault as Adrien
- Mathilde Seigner as Sandrine
- Jean-Paul Roussillon as Jean
- Frédéric Pierrot as Gérard
- Marc Berman as Stéphane

== Reception ==
A.O. Scott reacts positively, stating 'As Adrien reveals the tragedies and setbacks he has suffered in his struggle to remain on the land, a wider social background comes into view, and you, along with Sandrine, come to a profound and remarkably unsentimental appreciation of country life.'
