= Éric Caravaca =

French actor, film director and screenwriter

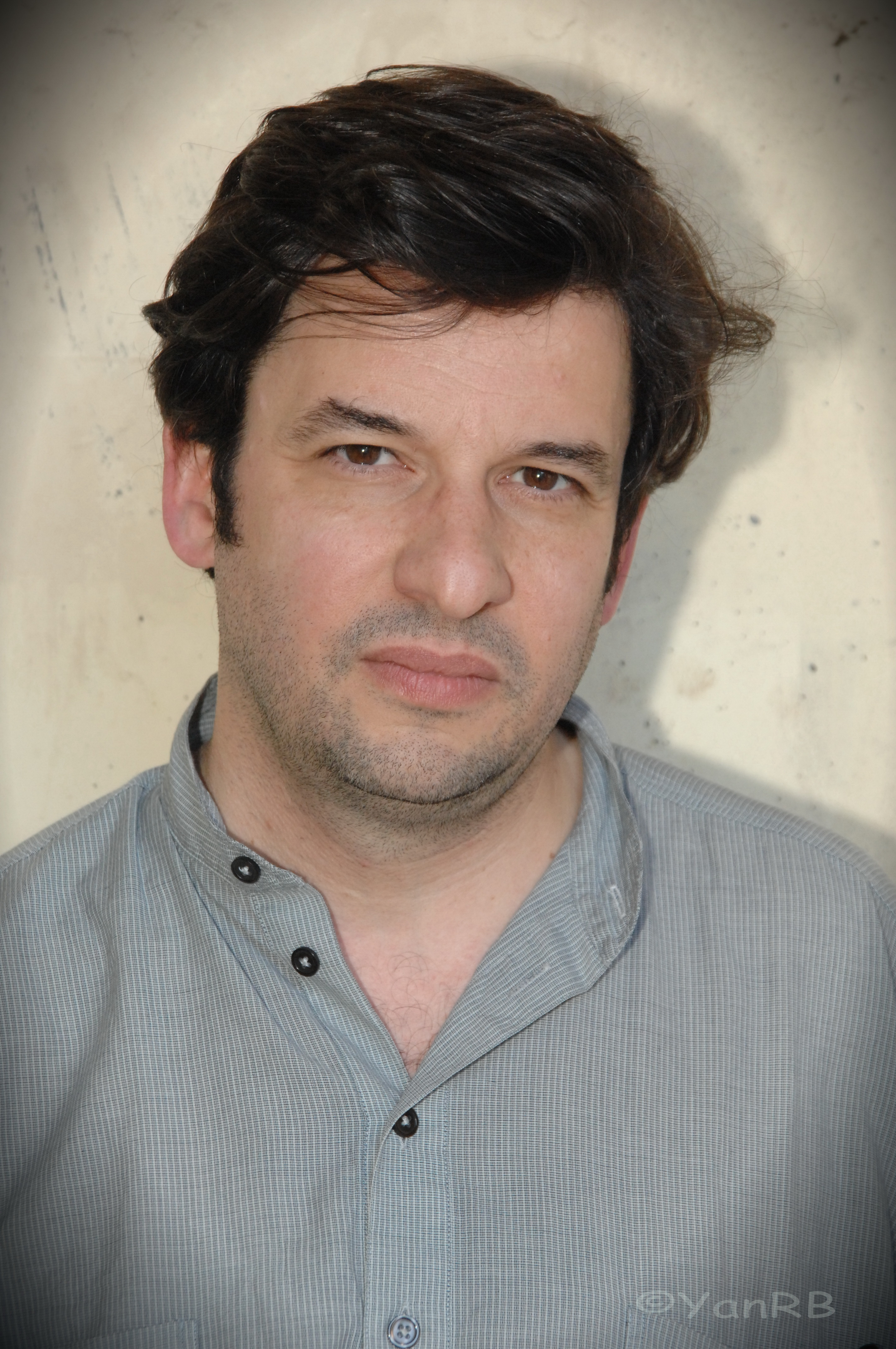
- Born: 21 November 1966 (age 58); Rennes, France
- Occupation(s): Actor, film director, screenwriter
- Years active: 1998–present

Éric Caravaca (born 21 November 1966) is a French actor, film director and screenwriter.

The son of an engineer, Caravaca (of Spanish origin) studied literature while taking acting lessons. After obtaining his degree, he left for Paris, where he joined l'École nationale supérieure d'arts et techniques du théâtre, and completed his formation at the Conservatoire national supérieur d'art dramatique. He then went to New York City in 1993, where he studied at the Actors Studio for a year.

Upon his return to France, he began his career in theatre and gained attention in Samuel Beckett's Waiting for Godot. He made his film debut in 1996, in Un samedi sur la terre by Diane Bertrand. He played mostly small roles until C'est quoi la vie?, directed by François Dupeyron in 1999, which earned him the César Award for Most Promising Actor. He worked again with Dupeyron in La chambre des officiers in 2001, and appeared as Luc in Patrice Chéreau's film Son frère in 2003, opposite Bruno Todeschini.

He directed his first film The Passenger in 2005, in which he also played a role (Thomas), opposite Julie Depardieu, which was presented at the Venice Film Festival.

== Selected filmography ==
- 1998 - La voie est libre, directed by Stéphane Clavier
- 1999 - Empty Days, directed by Marion Vernoux
- 1999 - La vie ne me fait pas peur, directed by Noémie Lvovsky
- 1999 - C'est quoi la vie?
- 2000 - La parenthèse enchantée, directed by Michel Spinosa
- 2000 - Sans plomb, director Muriel Téodori
- 2001 - The Officers' Ward, directed by François Dupeyron
- 2002 - Les amants du Nil, directed by Eric Heumann
- 2002 - Novo, directed by Jean-Pierre Limosin
- 2003 - Son frère, directed by Patrice Chéreau
- 2003 - That Woman, directed by Guillaume Nicloux
- 2004 - Inguelezi, directed by François Dupeyron
- 2005 - The Passenger
- 2006 - La Raison du plus faible, directed by Lucas Belvaux
- 2007 - Mon colonel, directed by Laurent Herbiet
- 2008 - Cliente, directed by Josiane Balasko
- 2009 - Eden à l'ouest , directed by Costas Gavras
- 2009 - Une petite zone de turbulences, directed by Alfred Lot
- 2010 - La petite chambre, directed by Stéphanie Chuat and Véronique Reymond
- 2011 - Chicken with Plums directed by Marjane Satrapi and Vincent Paronnaud
- 2015 - Prejudice directed by Antoine Cuypers
- 2017 - Back to Burgundy directed by Cédric Klapisch
- 2017 - Lover for a Day
- 2018 – Hippocrate, directed by Thomas Lilti
- 2019 - By the Grace of God directed by François Ozon
- 2021 - Everything Went Fine directed by François Ozon
- 2023 - Année Zéro, directed by Olivier Barma
- 2024 - Three Friends, directed by Emmanuel Mouret
