= 3rd Hanoi International Film Festival =

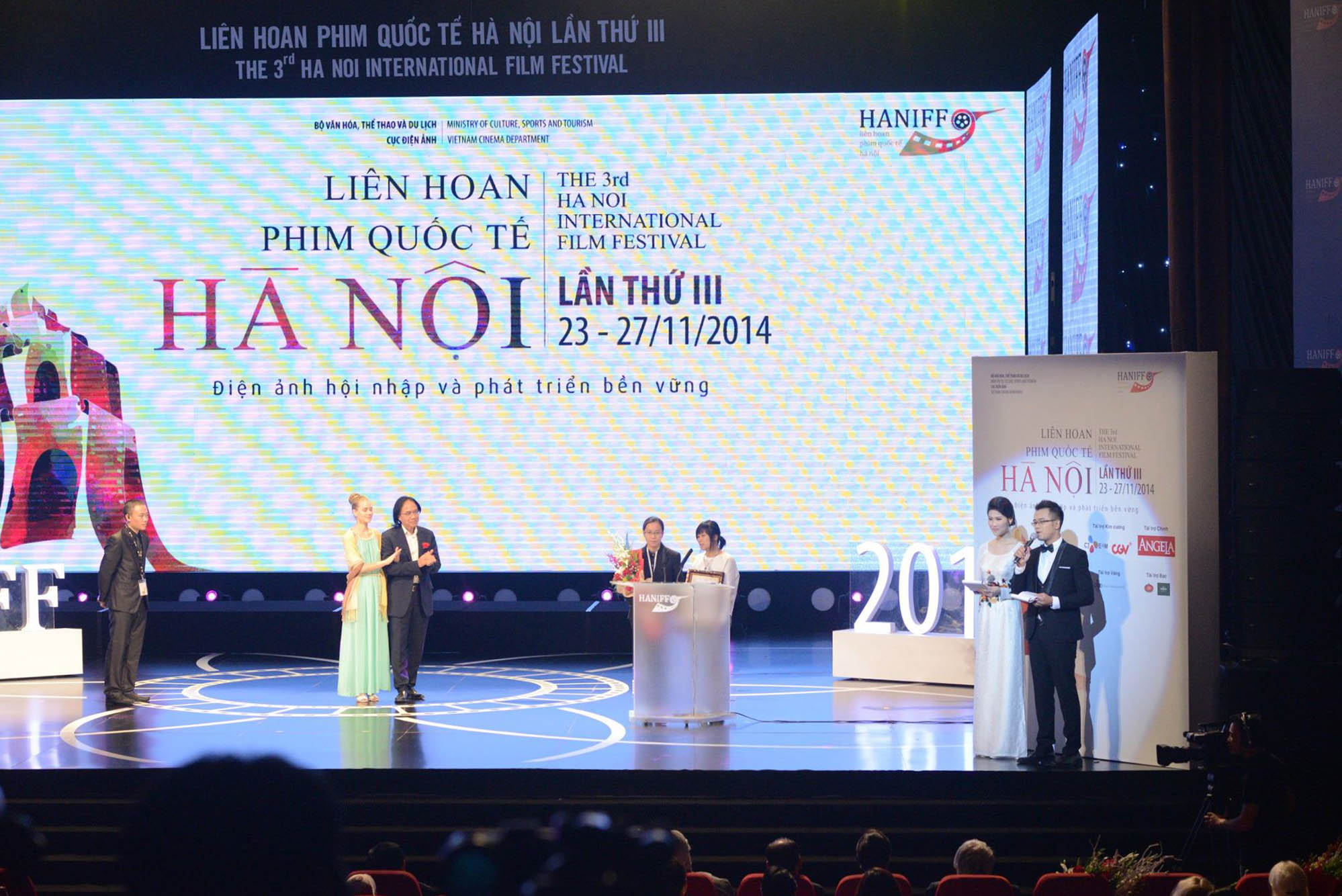
- Closing ceremony
- Opening film: Sivas (Turkey)
- Location: Hanoi, Vietnam
- Founded: 2010
- Awards: Best Feature Film: Two Women (Russia)
- Hosted by: Anh Tuấn, Ngô Phương Lan; Thu Hằng, Đức Bảo
- Festival date: November 23–27, 2014
- Website: Website

Hanoi International Film Festival chronology
- 4th 2nd

The 3rd Hanoi International Film Festival opened on November 23 and closed on November 27, 2014, at Hanoi Friendship Cultural Palace, with the slogan "Cinema - Integration and Sustainable Development" (Vietnamese: "Điện ảnh - Hội nhập và phát triển bền vững").

130 films from 33 countries were selected to be screened at the festival. In which, there will be 13 feature-length films and 30 short films participating in the competition.

== Programs ==
Many activities took place within the framework of this film festival, including "The Film Project Market" which was held for the first time.

Ceremonies - At Hanoi Friendship Cultural Palace, 91 Trần Hưng Đạo Street, Hoàn Kiếm District:

- Opening ceremony: 19:00, Sunday, November 23 (live broadcast on VTV1)
- Closing ceremony: 19:00, Thursday, November 27 (live broadcast on VTV1)

Professional Activities - At Hanoi Daewoo Hotel, 360 Kim Mã Street, Ba Đình District:

- Exhibition: To promote the filming scene and famous destinations of Vietnam (Vietnamese: "Quảng bá bối cảnh quay phim và những điểm đến nổi tiếng của Việt Nam"), opening 11:00, Sunday, November 23
- The HANIFF Campus: opening 9:00, Sunday, November 23, closing ceremony during 12:00-14:00 Thursday, November 27
  - Seminar during 9:00-12:00 Tuesday, November 25
- The Film Market Project: opening 9:00 Monday, November 24, closing 14:00 Tuesday, November 25
- Seminar: Film production cooperation between Vietnam and other countries (Vietnamese: "Hợp tác sản xuất phim giữa Việt Nam và các nước"), during 14:00-17:00 on Monday, November 24
- Seminar: Producing and Disseminating Independent Films - Experience from Philippine Cinema (Vietnamese: "Sản xuất và phổ biến phim độc lập - Kinh nghiệm từ điện ảnh Phi-líp-pin"), 15:00-17:00 Wednesday, November 26

Sightseeing and Themed night:

- Visiting Tràng An Scenic Landscape Complex, Ninh Bình Province, Tuesday, November 25
- Visiting Vietnamese Ethnology Museum, No. 01 Nguyễn Văn Huyên Street, Cầu Giấy District, 14:00, Wednesday, November 26
- The Hanoi Night Gala, 19:00, Wednesday, November 26 at Imperial Citadel of Thăng Long

Movie screenings in theaters and exchange program of artists with the audience:

- Showtimes: 9:00 - 23:00, November 23 to 27
- Theaters:
  - National Cinema Center, 87 Láng Hạ Street, Ba Đình District
  - Kim Đồng Cinema Theater, 19 Hàng Bài Street, Hoàn Kiếm District
  - August Cinema Theater, 45 Hàng Bài Street, Hoàn Kiếm District
  - CGV Cinemas, 6th floor, Hanoi Vincom Building, 191 Bà Triệu Street, Hai Bà Trưng District
  - CGV Cinemas, 5th floor, Mipec Tower, 229 Tây Sơn Street, Đống Đa District
- Tickets:All movie tickets at this festival are free, however, audiences will have to book 1 day in advance.

== Juries & Mentors ==
=== Juries ===
Like previous years, 3 jury panels were established for this film festival:

Feature film:

- Kirill Razlogov, film critic, director of Cinema Institute for Cultural Study in Russia, Moscow International Film Festival programmer - Chairman
- Niv Fichman (Canada) , producer
- Peque Gallaga (Philippines) , director
- Lee Doo-yong (South Korea) , director
- Hồng Ánh (Vietnam) , actress, producer

Short film:

- Lê Lâm (Vietnam), art director, professor at IDHEC Film School (France) - Chairman
- Joe Bateman (England) , Director of Rushes Soho Shorts Film Festival
- Bùi Thạc Chuyên, director, manager of The Center for Assistance and Development of Movie Talents (Vietnam Cinema Department)

Network for Promotion of Asian Cinema (NETPAC):

- Jeannette Paulson Hereniko (United States) , television scriptwriter, producer, President of AsiaPacificFilms.com, founder of Hawaii International Film Festival - Chairman
- Hauvick Habéchian (Lebanon) , film critic
- Lưu Nghiệp Quỳnh (Vietnam) , screenwriter

=== Mentors for the HANIFF Campus ===
The HANIFF Campus consists of 3 classes: visual director class, screenwriter class and directing class. In addition, the creation camp also has seminars and specialized seminars to exchange experiences and expertise among filmmakers. Activities under the guidance and teaching of mentors:

- Joe Lawlor (England) , producer, director, writer
- Cho Young-jik (South Korea) , cinematographer
- Uli Gaulke (Germany) , director
- Allen Dizon (Philippines) , actor
- Nguyễn Hoàng Điệp (Vietnam) , director

== Official Selection - In Competition ==
=== Feature film ===
There are 11 films were selected to compete for the official awards in Feature Film category.

English title	Original title	Director(s)	Production country
Camera ‡	Camera	James Leong	(Singapore) (Hong Kong)
Cinta/Mati ‡	Cinta/Mati	Ody C. Harahap	(Indonesia)
Fish & Cat	ماهی و گربه / Mahi va Gorbeh	Shahram Mokri	(Iran)
Flapping in the Middle of Nowhere ‡	Đập cánh giữa không trung	Nguyễn Hoàng Điệp	(Vietnam) (France)
Nagima	Нагима	Zhanna Issabayeva	(Kazakhstan)
The Children of the Village ‡	Những đứa con của làng	Nguyễn Đức Việt	(Vietnam)
The Coffin Maker ‡	Magkakabaung	Jason Paul Laxamana	(Philippines)
The Voiding Soul ‡	സ്വപാനം / Swapaanam	Shaji N. Karun	(India)
The Weight of Elephants	The Weight of Elephants	Daniel Borgman	(New Zealand)
Two Women	Две женщины / Dve zhenshchiny	Vera Glagoleva	(Russia)
Way Back Home ‡	집으로 가는 길 / Jibeuro Ganeun Gil	Bang Eun-jin	(South Korea)

The double-dagger (‡) indicates films selected to compete for the NETPAC Award.
Highlighted title indicates Best Feature Film Award winner.

==== NETPAC ====
There are 2 films selected to compete only for the NETPAC Award along with 7 films from the Best Feature Film competing list.

English title	Original title	Director(s)	Production country
Alone (Documentary Feature)	孤独 / Gudu	Wang Bing	(France) (Hong Kong)
The Singing Pond	හෝ ගානා පොකුණ / Ho Gaana Pokuna	Indika Ferdinando	(Sri Lanka)

=== Short film ===
These 30 short films were selected to compete for official awards in Short Film category:

Short:

- A Farewell Party (13′) (Australia)
- Cambodia 2099 (21′) (France)
- Close, Open / Đóng vào, mở ra (22′) (Vietnam)
- Curtain Call (8′) (South Korea)
- Enough (13′) (India)
- Fighting For (19′) (Hong Kong)
- Gyges (21′) (Taiwan)
- Herding (23′) (Kyrgyzstan)
- Jack Boy / 잭보이 (19′) (South Korea)
- Red Stop (10′) (India)
- Somewhere Only We Know / วันเวลาที่ผ่านเลยไป (20′) (Thailand)
- The Day After / Kinabukasan (17′) (Philippines)
- The Escapee / Trốn chạy (15′) (Vietnam)
- The Girl from Tomorrow / 来自未来的陪伴 (14′) (Malaysia)
- The Last Audition (15′) (India)
- The Pool Man / 泳漾 (30′) (Taiwan)
- Violin / WhyLean (15′) (India)
- Waiting For Colors / Menunggu Warna (12′) (Indonesia)
- What's Out There? / Ngoài kia có gì (14′) (Vietnam)

Documentary:

- Agraria Road / Lebuh Agraria (30′) (Malaysia)
- André Menras - A Vietnamese / André Menras - Một người Việt (30′) (Vietnam)
- I Sell Myself / Tôi đi bán tôi (16′) (Vietnam)
- Light in the Air / Ánh sáng giữa tầng không (24′) (Vietnam)
- Talking To My Best Friend / Trò chuyện với bạn thân (13′) (Vietnam)
- The Last Public Letter Writer In Ho Chi Minh City / Người viết thư thuê cuối cùng ở Thành phố Hồ Chí Minh (19′) (Vietnam)
- When I'd Come Back / Bao giờ về (15′) (Vietnam)

Animated:

- Crack (7′) (South Korea)
- Mỵ Châu - Trọng Thủy (30′) (Vietnam)
- Straw Man / Bù nhìn rơm (10′) (Vietnam)
- The Tail of Lizard / Đuôi của thằn lằn (12′) (Vietnam)

Highlighted title indicates Best Short Film Award winner.

== Official Selection - Out of Competition ==
These films were selected for out-of-competition screening programs:

The dagger † indicates films labeled NC 16

=== Opening ===
- Sivas – Kaan Müjdeci (Turkey)

=== Panorama: World Cinema ===
==== Feature film ====
- (Sex) Appeal / 寒蟬效應 – Wang Weiming (Taiwan) (China) †
- Aimless / Lạc lối – Phạm Nhuệ Giang (Vietnam)
- And a Verse Called Life / অনুব্রত ভালো আছো? – Partha Sen (India)
- Broken / 방황하는 칼날 – Lee Jeong-ho (South Korea) †
- Brothers: The Final Confession / Брати. Остання сповідь – Viktoria Trofimenko (Ukraine) †
- Camille Claudel 1915 – Bruno Dumont (France)
- Dubrovskiy / Дубровский – Kirill Mikhanovsky, Aleksandr Vartanov (Russia)
- Gentle / Dịu dàng – Lê Văn Kiệt (Vietnam) †
- I'm Still / Sigo Siendo – Javier Corcuera (Peru)
- I.D. – Kamal K. M. (India)
- Ilo Ilo / 爸媽不在家 – Anthony Chen (Singapore)
- Kami Histeria – Shamyl Othman (Malaysia)
- Living With History / Sống cùng lịch sử – Nguyễn Thanh Vân (Vietnam)
- Me, Myself and Mum / Les garçons et Guillaume, à table! – Guillaume Gallienne
  (France) †
- Melbourne / ملبورن – Nima Javidi (Iran)
- Philomena – Stephen Frears (United Kingdom)
- Red Amnesia / 闯入者 – Wang Xiaoshuai (China)
- Renoir – Gilles Bourdos (France) †
- Rise / Hương ga – Cường Ngô (Vietnam) †
- Shopping – Mark Albiston, Louis Sutherland (New Zealand)
- Soekarno – Hanung Bramantyo (Indonesia)
- Star / Звезда – Anna Melikian (Russia)
- The Isthmus / ที่ว่างระหว่างสมุทร – Sopawan Boonnimitra, Peerachai Kerdsint (Thailand)
- The Legend Makers / Những người viết huyền thoại – Bùi Tuấn Dũng (Vietnam)
- The Paternal House / خانه پدری – Kianoush Ayari (Iran)
- The Red Violin / Le Violon Rouge – François Girard (Canada) (Italy) (United Kingdom) †
- The Sacred Arrow / 五彩神箭 – Pema Tseden (China)
- The Selfish Giant – Clio Barnard (United Kingdom)
- Thread of Lies / 우아한 거짓말 – Lee Han (South Korea)
- Tunnel of Love: The Place for Miracles / クレヴァニ、愛のトンネル – Imazeki Akiyoshi (Japan)
- With You, Without You / ඔබ නැතුව ඔබ එක්ක – Prasanna Vithanage (Sri Lanka)
- Yves Saint Laurent – Jalil Lespert (France) †

==== Documentary Feature film ====
- As Time Goes By in Shanghai – Uli Gaulke (Germany)
- Jazz in Love – Baby Ruth Villarama (Philippines)
- Little Hanoi – Martina Saková (Germany) (Czech Republic)
- Masked Monkey - The Evolution Of Darwin's Theory – Ismail Fahmi Lubish (Indonesia)
- Sad Songs of Happiness – Constanze Knoche (Germany)
- The Empire of Shame / 탐욕의 제국 – Hong Li-gyeong (South Korea)
- The Missing Picture / L'Image manquante – Rithy Panh (Cambodia) (France)
- Thiện Nhân: The Human Flame / Lửa Thiện Nhân – Đặng Hồng Giang (Vietnam)

==== Short film ====
Short:

- Backyard (12′) (Indonesia)
- Chicken (15′) (Croatia) (Germany)
- Glitch (4′) (United States)
- Nostalgia (4′) (United States)

Documentary:

- Dr. Tran Duy Hung - A Hanoian / Bác sĩ Trần Duy Hưng - Một người Hà Nội (32′) (Vietnam)
- Hanoi In My Heart / Hà Nội Trong Tôi (29′) (Vietnam)
- Moana: The Rising of the Sea (35′) (United States)
- Royal Recognition / Đạo sắc phong (30′) (Vietnam)
- Stem Cell Application / Ứng dụng tế bào gốc (29′) (Vietnam)
- The Encounter of the Dragon and the Clouds / Long vân khánh hội (35′) (Vietnam)
- Travel To The Country That No Longer Exists (43′) (Cuba)

Animated:

- Beluga (2′) (United States)
- Birthday (3′) (United States)
- Bookends (3′) (United States)
- Broken Wand (3′) (United States)
- Butterfly Song (3′) (United States)
- Cigarette Smoke / Khói thuốc lá (10′) (Vietnam)
- Fire Fin Leader / Thủ lĩnh vây lửa (10′) (Vietnam)
- Monster (2′) (United States)
- Nexus (2′) (United States)
- Parcel Quest (2′) (United States)
- Plucking White Turnip / Nhổ củ cải (14′) (Vietnam)
- Rhacophorus & Hylarana / Chẫu Chàng - Chẫu Chuộc (10′) (Vietnam)
- Seed (2′) (United States)

=== Country-in-Focus: Philippines ===
For the Country-in-Focus Program this year, 6 Filipino independent films produced in 2013 were selected as follows:

- Lauriana – Mel Chionglo
- Otso – Elwood Perez
- Rekorder – Mikhail Red
- Sonata – Lore Reyes, Peque Gallaga
- Transit – Hannah Espia
- What Are the Colors of Forgotten Dreams? / Ano ang kulay ng mga nakalimutang pangarap? – Jose Javier Reyes

=== NETPAC Award-winning Films ===
- CR No: 89 / ക്രൈം നമ്പർ: 89 – Sudevan (India)
- Harmony Lessons / Асланның сабақтары – Emir Baigazin (Kazakhstan)
- Justice / Hustisya – Joel Lamangan (Philippines)
- The Patience Stone / سنگ صبور – Atiq Rahimi (Afghanistan) (France) †
- What They Don't Talk About When They Talk About Love / yang tidak dibicarakan ketika membicarakan cinta – Mouly Surya (Indonesia) †

=== Contemporary Vietnamese Films (Vietnam) ===
- Âm mưu giày gót nhọn / How to Fight in Six Inch Heels – Hàm Trần
- Bước khẽ đến hạnh phúc / Gentle Steps to Happiness – Lưu Trọng Ninh †
- Căn phòng của mẹ / Homostratus – Síu Phạm
- Đoạt hồn / Hollow – Hàm Trần †
- Scandal: Hào quang trở lại / Scandal 2 – Victor Vu †
- Hiệp sĩ mù / Blind Warrior – Lưu Huỳnh †
- Lạc giới / Paradise in Heart – Phi Tiến Sơn †
- Mùa hè lạnh / Cold Summer – Ngô Quang Hải †
- Nước 2030 / 2030 – Nguyễn Võ Nghiêm Minh †
- Quả tim máu / Vengeful Heart – Victor Vu
- Thần tượng / The Talent – Nguyễn Quang Huy

== Awards ==
The official awards were awarded at the closing ceremony of the festival, on the evening of October 31. The HANIFF Campus and Film Project Market organized their own awards ceremony for their participants before.

=== In Competition - Feature film ===
- Best Feature Film: Two Women (Russia)
  - Jury Prize for Feature Film: Flapping in the Middle of Nowhere (Vietnam) (France)
  - Other nominees: The Coffin Maker (Philippines) , Fish & Cat (Iran) , The Weight of Elephants (New Zealand)
- Best Director: Shahram Mokri – Fish & Cat (Iran)
  - Other nominees: Vera Glagoleva – Two Women (Russia) , Bang Eun-jin – Way Back Home (South Korea)
- Best Leading Actor: Allen Dizon – The Coffin Maker (Philippines)
  - Other nominees: Thanh Duy – Flapping in the Middle of Nowhere (Vietnam) , Go Soo – Way Back Home (South Korea)
- Best Leading Actress: Anna Astrakhantseva – Two Women (Russia)
  - Other nominees: Thùy Anh – Flapping in the Middle of Nowhere (Vietnam) , Dina Tukubayeva – Nagima (Kazakhstan)
- Special Mention for Child Actor: Demos Murphy – The Weight of Elephants (New Zealand)

=== In Competition - Short film ===
- Best Short Film: Waiting for Colors – Adriyanto Dewo (Indonesia)
  - Jury Prize for Short Film: What's Out There? – Nguyễn Diệp Thùy Anh (Vietnam)
  - Other nominees: Herding – Ruslan Akun (Kyrgyzstan) , Cambodia 2099 – Davy Chou (France) , Crack – Ahn Yong-hae (South Korea)
- Best Young Director of a Short Film: Ruslan Akun – Herding (Kyrgyzstan)
  - Other nominees: Trần Thế Khương – The Last Public Letter Writer In Ho Chi Minh City (Vietnam) , Đỗ Quốc Trung – Close, Open (Vietnam)

=== NETPAC Award ===
- NETPAC's Award for Asian Cinema Promotion: The Coffin Maker (Philippines)

=== The HANIFF Campus ===
- Best Student - D.O.P Class: Nguyễn Minh Tiến (Vietnam)
- Best Student - Screenwriting Class: Nguyễn Thị Mỹ Trang (Vietnam)
- Best Student - Directing Class: Shin-il (South Korea)

=== The Film Project Market ===
- Best Project: Honeygiver Among the Dogs – Dechen Roder (Bhutan)
  - Jury Prize for Film Project: A Shade of Paradise – Síu Phạm (Vietnam)
  - Other nominees: 30 Days of Ginger – Teo Eng Tiong (Singapore) , A Wrong Season – Carlo Francisco Manatad (Philippines) , We Ain’t Nice Always – Phan Gia Nhật Linh (Vietnam)
