= 71st Venice International Film Festival =

Italian film festival in 2014

- Festival poster
- Opening film: Birdman
- Closing film: The Golden Era
- Location: Venice, Italy
- Founded: 1932
- Awards: Golden Lion: A Pigeon Sat on a Branch Reflecting on Existence
- Hosted by: Luisa Ranieri
- Artistic director: Alberto Barbera
- Festival date: 27 August – 6 September 2014
- Website: Website

Venice Film Festival chronology
- 72nd 70th

The 71st annual Venice International Film Festival, was held from 27 August to 6 September 2014, at Venice Lido in Italy.

French composer Alexandre Desplat was the jury president for the main competition. Italian actress Luisa Ranieri hosted the opening and closing nights of the festival. The Golden Lion was awarded to A Pigeon Sat on a Branch Reflecting on Existence by Roy Andersson.

American editor Thelma Schoonmaker and American filmmaker Frederick Wiseman were the recipients of the Golden Lion for Lifetime Achievement.

The festival poster paid tribute to François Truffaut, as it featured the character of Antoine Doinel portrayed by Jean-Pierre Léaud from Truffaut's 1959 drama film The 400 Blows.

The festival opened with Birdman by Alejandro G. Iñárritu, and closed with The Golden Era by Ann Hui.

== Juries ==
=== Main Competition (Venezia 71) ===
- Alexandre Desplat, French composer - Jury President
- Joan Chen, Chinese actress and director
- Philip Gröning, German director
- Jessica Hausner, Austrian filmmaker
- Jhumpa Lahiri, Indian novelist
- Sandy Powell, English costume designer
- Tim Roth, British actor
- Elia Suleiman, Palestinian filmmaker
- Carlo Verdone, Italian actor and director

=== Horizons (Orizzonti) ===
- Ann Hui, Hong Kong director - Jury President
- Moran Atias, Israeli actress
- Pernilla August, Swedish actress and director
- David Chase, American writer and director
- Mahamat-Saleh Haroun, Chadian director
- Roberto Minervini, Italian director
- Alin Taşçıyan, Turkish critic

=== Opera Prima (Venice Award for a Debut Film) ===
- Alice Rohrwacher, Italian filmmaker - Jury President
- Lisandro Alonso: Argentine filmmaker
- Ron Mann, Canadian filmmaker
- Vivian Qu, Chinese filmmaker
- Răzvan Rădulescu, Romanian novelist and filmmaker

== Official Sections ==
=== In Competition ===
The following films were selected for the main competition:

English title	Original title	Director(s)	Production country
99 Homes		Ramin Bahrani	United States
Birdman or (The Unexpected Virtue of Ignorance) (opening film)		Alejandro G. Iñárritu	United States
Black Souls	Anime nere	Francesco Munzi	Italy, France
The Cut		Fatih Akin	Germany, France, Italy, Canada, Poland, Turkey
Far from Men	Loin des hommes	David Oelhoffen	France
Fires on the Plain	野火	Shinya Tsukamoto	Japan
Good Kill		Andrew Niccol	United States
Hungry Hearts		Saverio Costanzo	Italy
The Last Hammer Blow	Le dernier coup de marteau	Alix Delaporte	France
Leopardi	Il giovane favoloso	Mario Martone	Italy
The Look of Silence	Senyap	Joshua Oppenheimer	Denmark, Finland, Indonesia, Norway, United Kingdom
Manglehorn		David Gordon Green	United States
Pasolini		Abel Ferrara	France, Belgium, Italy
A Pigeon Sat on a Branch Reflecting on Existence	En duva satt på en gren och funderade på tillvaron	Roy Andersson	Sweden, Germany, Norway, France
The Postman's White Nights	Белые ночи почтальона Алексея Тряпицына	Andrei Konchalovsky	Russia
The Price of Fame	La rançon de la gloire	Xavier Beauvois	France, Belgium, Switzerland
Red Amnesia	闯入者	Wang Xiaoshuai	China
Sivas		Kaan Müjdeci	Turkey
Tales	قصه ها	Rakhshān Banietemad	Iran
Three Hearts	3 cœurs	Benoît Jacquot	France

=== Out of Competition ===
The following films were selected to be screened out of competition:

English title	Original title	Director(s)	Production country
Fiction Films
The Boxtrolls		Anthony Stacchi and Graham Annable	United States
Burying the Ex		Joe Dante	United States
Dearest	親愛的	Peter Ho-sun Chan	Hong Kong, China
The Golden Era (closing film)	黃金時代	Ann Hui	China, Hong Kong
The Humbling		Barry Levinson	United States
Nymphomaniac Volume II (uncut version)		Lars Von Trier	Denmark, Germany, France, Belgium
The Old Man of Belem	O velho do restelo	Manoel de Oliveira	Portugal, France
Olive Kitteridge (4 episodes)		Lisa Cholodenko	United States
Perez.		Edoardo De Angelis	Italy
Revivre	화장	Im Kwon-taek	South Korea
She's Funny That Way		Peter Bogdanovich	United States
The Sound and the Fury		James Franco	United States
Tsili		Amos Gitai	Israel, Russia, Italy, France
Words with Gods		Guillermo Arriaga, Emir Kusturica, Amos Gitai, Mira Nair, Warwick Thornton, Hector Babenco, Bahman Ghobadi, Hideo Nakata and Alex de la Iglesia	Mexico, United States
Non Fiction
The Devil's Soup	La zuppa del demonio	Davide Ferrario	Italy
In the Basement	Im Keller	Ulrich Seidl	Austria
Italy in a Day	Un giorno da italiani	Gabriele Salvatores	Italy, United Kingdom
The State-Mafia Pact	La trattativa	Sabina Guzzanti	Italy

=== Orizzonti ===
The following films were selected for the Horizons (Orizzonti) section:

English title	Original title	Director(s)	Production country
In Competition
Belluscone: A Sicilian Story	Belluscone, una storia siciliana	Franco Maresco	Italy
Bypass		Duane Hopkins	United Kingdom
Court		Chaitanya Tamhane	India
Cymbeline		Michael Almereyda	United States
Goodnight Mommy	Ich seh, Ich seh	Veronika Franz and Severin Fiala	Austria
Heaven Knows What		Josh Safdie and Ben Safdie	United States, France
Hill of Freedom	자유의 언덕	Hong Sang-soo	South Korea
Jackie & Ryan		Ami Canaan Mann	United States
Line of Credit	Kreditis Limiti	Salome Alexi	Georgia, Germany, France
Nabat		Elchin Musaoglu	Azerbaijan
Near Death Experience		Benoît Delépine and Gustave Kervern	France
The President	پرزیدنت	Mohsen Makhmalbaf	Georgia, France, United Kingdom, Germany
Reality	Réalité	Quentin Dupieux	France, Belgium
Theeb	ذيب	Naji Abu Nowar	Jordan, United Arab Emirates, Qatar, United Kingdom
These Are the Rules	Takva Su Pravila	Ognjen Sviličić	Croatia, France, Serbia, Macedonia
La vita oscena		Renato De Maria	Italy
Without Pity	Senza nessuna pietà	Michele Alhaique	Italy
Short Films - Competition
3/105		Avelina Prat and Diego Opazo	Spain
Art	Arta	Adrian Sitaru	Romania
The Baby	Bacheh	Ali Asgari	Italy, Iran
Cams		Carl-Johan Westregård	Sweden
Castillo y el Armado		Pedro Harres	Brazil
Daily Bread	Pat-Lehem	Idan Hubel	Israel
Era Apocrypha		Brendan Sweeny	United States
Ferdinand Knapp		Andrea Baldini	France
Great Heat	大暑	Chen Tao	China
In Overtime	Fi Al Waqt Al Dae'a	Rami Yasin	Jordan, Palestine
Mademoiselle		Guillaume Gouix	France
Maryam		Sidi Saleh	Indonesia
Out of competition
L'attesa del maggio		Simone Massi	Italy
Lift You Up		Ramin Bahrani	United States
On the Bride's Side	Io sto con la sposa	Antonio Augugliaro, Gabriele Del Grande, Khaled Soliman Al Nassiry	Italy, Palestine

=== Venice Classics ===
The following selection of restored classic films and documentaries on cinema were screened for this section:

English title	Original title	Director(s)	Production country
Restored Films
The Audience (aka Papal Audience)	L'udienza (1971)	Marco Ferreri	Italy
The Bride (1973)	Gelin	Ömer Lütfi Akad	Turkey
China is Near (1967)	La Cina è vicina	Marco Bellocchio	Italy
Guys and Dolls (1955)		Joseph L. Mankiewicz	United States
The Innocents (1961)		Jack Clayton	United Kingdom
The Iron Mask (1929)		Allan Dwan	United States
Love Exists	L'Amour existe (1960)	Maurice Pialat	France
Macbeth (The Tragedy of Macbeth) (1971)		Roman Polanski	United Kingdom, United States
The Man from Laramie (1955)		Anthony Mann	United States
Mouchette (1967)		Robert Bresson	France
No End (1985)	Bez końca	Krzysztof Kieślowski	Poland
Of Wayward Love (1962)	L'amore difficile (segment: L'avventura di un soldato)	Nino Manfredi	Italy
One Way or Another	Todo modo (1976)	Elio Petri	Italy
Only She Knows (1960)	彼女だけが知っている	Osamu Takahashi	Japan
A Special Day (1977)	Una giornata particolare	Ettore Scola	Italy
Stolen Kisses (1968)	Baisers volés	François Truffaut	France
The Tales of Hoffmann (1951)		Michael Powell, Emeric Pressburger	United Kingdom
Umberto D. (1952)		Vittorio De Sica	Italy
Walking the Streets of Moscow (1963)	Ya shagayu po Moskve	Georgiy Daneliya	Soviet Union
The Warrior (1916)	Maciste alpino	Luigi Maggi, Luigi Romano Borgnetto	Italy
Without Pity (1948)	Senza pietà	Alberto Lattuada	Italy
Documentaries about Cinema
Animata resistenza		Francesco Montagner & Alberto Girotto	Italy
Flowers of Taipei – Taiwan New Cinema	Guangyin de gushi – Taiwan Xin Dianying	Chinlin Hsieh	Taiwan
Red Chairs - Parma and the Cinema	Poltrone Rosse - Parma e il Cinema	Francesco Barilli	Italy
Altman		Ron Mann	Canada

=== Biennale College - Cinema ===
The following films were screened for the "Biennale College - Cinema" section, a higher education training workshop for micro-budget feature films:

English title	Original title	Director(s)	Country
H.		Rania Attieh and Daniel Garcia	United States, Argentina
Blood Cells		Joseph Bull and Luke Seomore	United Kingdom
Short Skin	Short Skin - I dolori del giovane Edo	Duccio Chiarini	Italy, Iran, United Kingdom

=== Final Cut in Venice ===
The following films were screened for the "Final Cut in Venice" section, a workshop to support the post-production of films from Africa:

English title	Original title	Director(s)	Country
The Council	Al majlis	Yahya Alabdallah	Jordan, United Arab Emirates
I Have a Picture		Mohamed Zedan	Egypt
A Maid For Each	Makhdoumin	Maher Abi Samra	Lebanon, France
Possessed by Djinn		Dalia Al Kury	Jordan, Germany
Rollaball		Eddie Edwards	South Africa, Ghana
Tee Shirt Man		Tovoniaina Rasoanaivo	Madagascar

=== Special Screenings ===
The following films were the Special Screenings of the Official Selection:

- 9x10 novanta, by various Italian directors. A film composed of footages from the Luce Archives, to celebrate the 90th anniversary of the Istituto Luce. It was presented in collaboration with Venice Days (see also section below).
- Taipei Factory II by Hou Chi-Jan, Cho Li, and Hsieh Chun-Yi (Chinese Taipei)

== Independent Sections ==
=== International Critics’ Week ===
The following films were selected for the 29th Venice International Film Critics' Week:

English title	Original title	Director(s)	Production country
In competition
40-Love	Terre battue	Stéphane Demoustier	France
The Coffin in the Mountain	殡棺	Xin Yukun	China
The Council of Birds	Zerrumpelt Herz	Timm Kröger	Germany
Dancing with Maria		Ivan Gergolet	Italy, Argentina, Slovenia
Flapping in the Middle of Nowhere	Đập cánh giữa không trung	Nguyễn Hoàng Điệp	Vietnam, France, Norway, Germany
No One's Child	Ничије дете	Vuk Ršumović	Serbia
Villa Touma		Suha Arraf	Israel, Germany
Out of competition
Melbourne (opening film)		Nima Javidi	Iran
The Market (closing film)	Arance e Martello	Diego Bianchi	Italy

=== Venice Days ===
The following films were selected for the 11th edition of the Venice Days (Giornate degli Autori) section:

English title	Original title	Director(s)	Production country
In Competition
Before I Disappear		Shawn Christensen	United States
Between 10 and 12	Tussen 10 en 12	Peter Hoogendoorn	Netherlands
The Dinner	I nostri ragazzi	Ivano De Matteo	Italy
The Farewell Party	Mita Tova	Tal Granit, Sharon Maymon	Israel, Germany
The Goob		Guy Myhill	United Kingdom
Labour of Love	Asha jaoar majhe	Aditya Vikram Sengupta	India
Messi		Álex de la Iglesia	Spain
Métamorphoses		Christophe Honoré	France
The Midfielder	El 5 de Talleres	Adrián Biniez	Argentina, Uruguay
One on One	일대일	Kim Ki-duk	South Korea
Patria		Felice Farina	Italy
Return to Ithaca	Retour à Ithaque	Laurent Cantet	France
The Smell of Us		Larry Clark	France
Summer Nights	Les nuits d'été	Mario Fanfani	France
They Have Escaped	He ovat paenneet	JP Valkepää	Finland, Netherlands
Special events
9x10 novanta		Marco Bonfanti, Sara Fgaier, Claudio Giovannesi, Alina Marazzi, Pietro Marcello, Giovanni Piperno, Costanza Quatriglio, Paola Randi, Alice Rohrwacher, Roland Sejko	Italy
Five Star		Keith Miller	United States
The Lack		Masbedo	Italy
The Show MAS Go On		Rä di Martino	Italy
Miu Miu Women's Tales
Someone	Nanimono	Miranda July	Italy, United States
Spark and Light		So Yong Kim	Italy, United States
Premio Lux
Class Enemy	Razredni sovražnik	Rok Biček	Slovenia
Ida		Paweł Pawlikowski	Poland, Denmark
Girlhood	Bande de filles	Céline Sciamma	France

== Official Awards ==
=== In Competition (Venezia 71) ===
- Golden Lion: A Pigeon Sat on a Branch Reflecting on Existence by Roy Andersson
- Silver Lion for Best Director: Andrei Konchalovsky for The Postman's White Nights
- Grand Jury Prize: The Look of Silence by Joshua Oppenheimer
- Volpi Cup for Best Actor: Adam Driver for Hungry Hearts
- Volpi Cup for Best Actress: Alba Rohrwacher for Hungry Hearts
- Marcello Mastroianni Award: Romain Paul for The Last Hammer Blow
- Best Screenplay: Rakhshān Banietemad & Farid Mostafavi for Tales
- Special Jury Prize: Sivas by Kaan Müjdeci

=== Orizzonti ===
- Best Film: Court by Chaitanya Tamhane
- Best Director: Theeb by Naji Abu Nowar
- Special Jury Prize: Belluscone: A Sicilian Story by Franco Maresco
- Special Award for Best Actor or Actress: Emir Hadžihafizbegović for These Are the Rules
- Horizons Award for Best Short Film: Maryam by Sidi Saleh

=== Lion of the Future ===
- Luigi De Laurentiis Award for a Debut Film: Court by Chaitanya Tamhane

=== Venice Classics ===
- Best Restored Film: A Special Day by Ettore Scola
- Best Documentary on Cinema: Animata Resistenza by Francesco Montagner and Alberto Girotto

=== Golden Lion for Lifetime Achievement ===
- Thelma Schoonmaker
- Frederick Wiseman

== Independent Sections Awards ==
=== 29th Venice International Critics' Week ===
- RaroVideo Audience Award for Best Film: No One's Child by Vuk Ršumović
- FEDEORA awards
  - Best Film: Flapping in The Middle of Nowhere by Nguyễn Hoàng Điệp
  - Best Screenplay: No One's Child by Vuk Ršumović
- "Civitas Vitae prossima" Award: Ivan Gergolet for Dancing with Maria

=== Giornate degli Autori ===
- Venice Days Award: Return to Ithaca by Laurent Cantet
- BNL People's Choice Award: The Farewell Party by Tal Granit and Sharon Maymon
- Europa Cinemas Label Award for Best European Film: The Dinner by Ivano De Matteo
- FEDEORA Awards
  - Best Film: One on One by Kim Ki-duk
  - Best Director of a Debut Film: Aditya Vikram Sengupta for Labour of Love
- Brian Award - UAAR: The Farewell Party by Tal Granit and Sharon Maymon

== Independent Awards ==
=== Queer Lion ===
- Summer Nights by Mario Fanfani

=== Persol Tribute to Visionary Talent Award ===
- Frances McDormand

=== Jaeger-LeCoultre Glory to the Filmmaker Award ===
- James Franco

=== L’Oréal Paris per il Cinema Award ===
- Valentina Corti

=== Gillo Pontecorvo Arcobaleno Latino Award ===
- The Show MAS Go On by Rä di Martino

=== Cinecibo Award ===
- The Dinner by Ivano De Matteo

=== Pasinetti Special Award ===
- The Dinner by Ivano De Matteo

=== Open Award ===
- Rä di Martino for The Show MAS Go On

=== FIPRESCI Awards ===
- Best Film (Main competition): The Look of Silence by Joshua Oppenheimer
- Best Film (Venice International Critics' Week): No One's Child by Vuk Ršumović

=== SIGNIS Award ===
- Far from Men by David Oelhoffen
  - Special mention: 99 Homes by Ramin Bahrani

=== Francesco Pasinetti - SNGCI Award ===
- Best Film: Black Souls by Francesco Munzi
- Best Actor: Elio Germano for Leopardi
- Best Actress: Alba Rohrwacher for Hungry Hearts
- Special Award: Saverio Costanzo for Hungry Hearts
- Special Award: Pierfrancesco Favino for Without Pity

=== Leoncino d'Oro Agiscuola Award ===
- Birdman by Alejándro G. Iñárritu

=== Cinema for UNICEF mention ===
- Hungry Hearts by Saverio Costanzo

=== Arca CinemaGiovani Award ===
- Best Film of Venezia 71: Far from Men by David Oelhoffen
- Best Italian film: Belluscone: A Sicilian Story by Franco Maresco

=== CICAE - Cinema d’Arte e d’Essai Award ===
- Heaven Knows What by Josh and Ben Safdie

=== Fedeora Award for Best Euro-Mediterranean film ===
- The Look of Silence by Joshua Oppenheimer

=== FEDIC Award ===
- On the Bride's Side by Antonio Augugliaro, Gabriele Del Grande, Khaled Soliman Al Nassiry
  - Special mention: Italy in a Day by Gabriele Salvatores

=== Fondazione Mimmo Rotella Award ===
- Luigi Musini (producer) for Black Souls

=== Future Film Festival Digital Award ===
- Birdman by Alejandro González Iñárritu
  - Special mention: Italy in a day by Gabriele Salvatores

=== P. Nazareno Taddei Award ===
- Birdman by Alejandro González Iñárritu

==== Lanterna Magica (CGS) Award ====
- The Last Hammer Blow by Alix Delaporte

=== Golden Mouse ===
- The Look of Silence by Joshua Oppenheimer
- Silver Mouse: Olive Kitteridge by Lisa Cholodenko

=== The Most Innovative Budget ===
- Italy in a Day by Gabriele Salvatores

=== Interfilm Award for Promoting Interreligious Dialogue ===
- Far from Men by David Oelhoffen

=== Young Jury Members of the Vittorio Veneto Film Festival ===
- Best film: 99 Homes by Ramin Bahrani
- Best actor: Elio Germano for Leopardi
  - Special mention: Fatih Akin for The Cut

=== Green Drop Award ===
- The Postman's White Nights by Andrei Konchalovsky

=== Soundtrack Stars Award ===
- Critic's Choice Award: Alexandre Desplat
- Best Soundtrack Award: Birdman by Alejandro González Iñárritu

=== Schermi di Qualità Award – Carlo Mazzacurati ===
- Black Souls by Francesco Munzi

=== Human Rights Nights Award ===
- On the Bride's Side by Antonio Augugliaro, Gabriele Del Grande, Khaled Soliman Al Nassiry
- The Look of Silence by Joshua Oppenheimer

=== Piccioni Award ===
- soundtrack of Leopardi, music by Sascha Ring

=== AssoMusica “Ho visto una Canzone” Award ===
- song Just One Day, from the film Italy in a day

=== "Sorriso diverso Venezia 2014" Award ===
- On the Bride's Side by Antonio Augugliaro, Gabriele Del Grande, Khaled Soliman Al Nassiry

=== 1st Akai International Film Festival ===
- Best Revelation: Xin Yukun for The Coffin in the Mountain
- Best Direction: Francesco Munzi for Black Souls
- Best Actress: Iaia Forte for Leopardi, The Show MAS Go On & La vita oscena
- Best Actor: Jacopo Olmo Antinori for The Dinner
