= Grégory Gadebois =

French actor (born 1976)

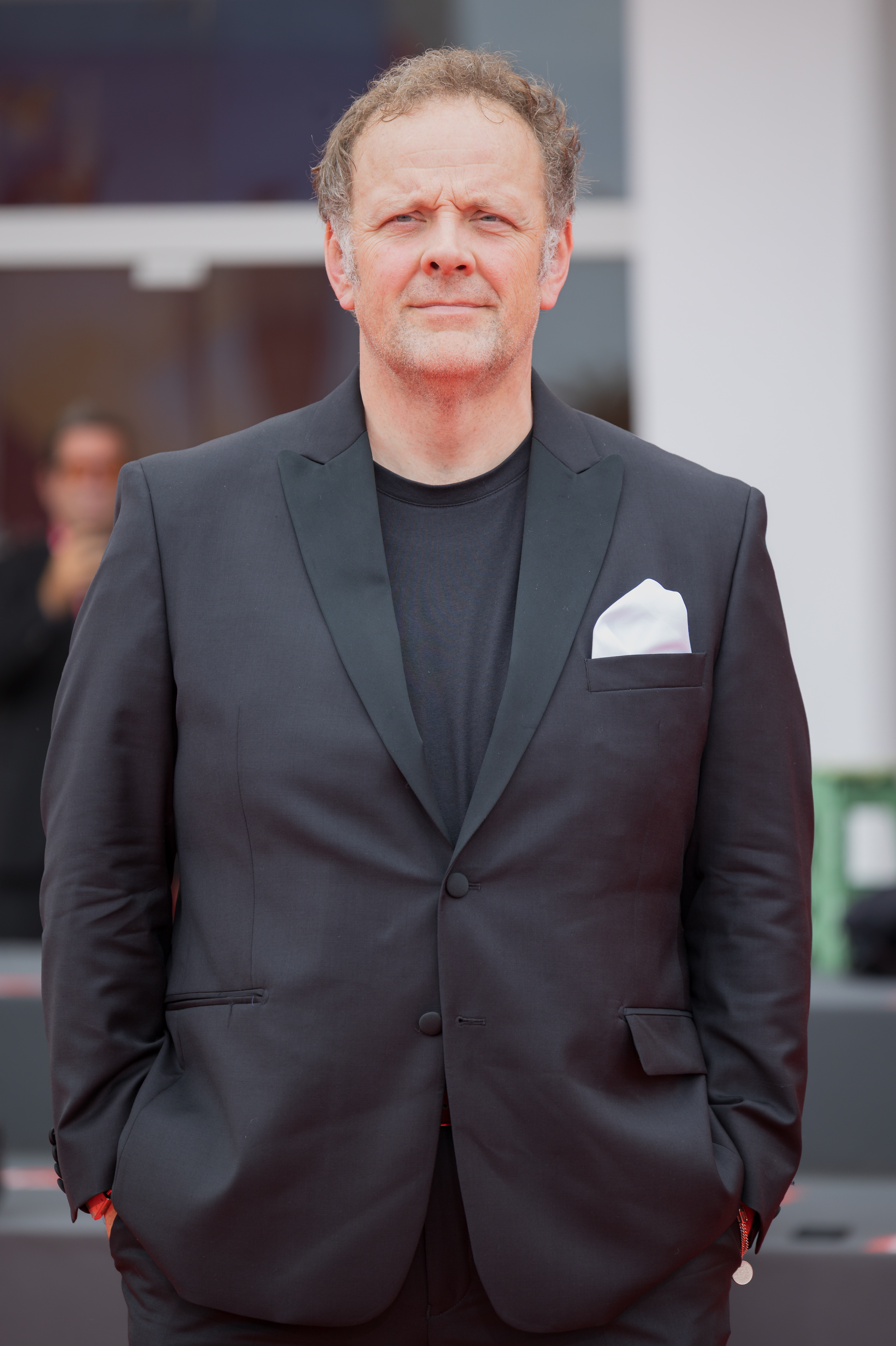
- Gadebois in 2025
- Born: 24 July 1976 (age 50); Gruchet-le-Valasse, Seine-Maritime, France
- Occupation: Actor
- Years active: 2001–present

Grégory Gadebois (born 24 July 1976) is a French actor.

== Career ==
Before his career as an actor begin, he worked as a mover.

He studied at the CNSAD in the class of Catherine Hiegel and Dominique Valadié. He was a member of the Comédie-Française from 2006 to 2012.

In 2012, he won the César Award for Most Promising Actor for Angel & Tony directed by Alix Delaporte. He received two other nominations, first in 2013 for Best Actor for One of a Kind and then in 2019 for Best Supporting Actor for An Officer and a Spy.

In 2014, he won the Molière Award for Best One Man Show for his work on the play Flowers for Algernon, directed by Anne Kessler.

== Personal life ==
His mother was a school teacher and told him to start doing theater. He is the eldest of three children. He grew up without the presence of his father.

He met his wife, Clémentine, during the filming of Angel & Tony, in 2009. She worked on the movie as a production assistant.

== Theatre ==
Year	Title	Writer	Director	Notes
2001-03	La Marmite	Plaute	Brigitte Jaques-Wajeman	
2002-03	Pseudolus, le truqueur	Plaute	Brigitte Jaques-Wajeman	
2003-04	Faith, Hope, and Charity	Ödön von Horváth	Cécile Garcia-Fogel	
2004	Fables de La Fontaine	Jean de La Fontaine	Robert Wilson	
2005	E, roman-dit	Daniel Danis	Alain Françon	
2005	L'Amour médecin	Molière	Jonathan Duverger & Jean-Marie Villégier	
2005	Merlin ou la Terre dévastée	Tankred Dorst	Jorge Lavelli	
2005	Le Sicilien ou L'Amour peintre	Molière	Jonathan Duverger & Jean-Marie Villégier	
2006	Il campiello	Carlo Goldoni	Jacques Lassalle	
2006	Getting Attention	Martin Crimp	Christophe Rauck	
2006-07	Cyrano de Bergerac	Edmond Rostand	Denis Podalydès	
2007	On the High Road	Anton Chekhov	Guillaume Gallienne	
2007	Le Retour au désert	Bernard-Marie Koltès	Muriel Mayette	
2007	Don Quichotte et Sancho Pança	António José da Silva	Émilie Valantin	
2007-09	The Marriage of Figaro	Pierre Beaumarchais	Christophe Rauck	
2008	Il campiello	Carlo Goldoni	Jacques Lassalle	
2008	Penthesilea	Heinrich von Kleist	Jean Liermier	
2008	Figaro Gets a Divorce	Ödön von Horváth	Jacques Lassalle	
2008	Trois Hommes dans un salon	François-René Christiani	Anne Kessler	
2008-10	Le Mariage forcé	Molière	Pierre Pradinas	
2009	L’Ordinaire	Michel Vinaver	Gilone Brun & Michel Vinaver	
2009-11	Ubu roi	Alfred Jarry	Jean-Pierre Vincent	
2010	Les Naufragés	Guy Zilberstein	Anne Kessler	
2010	Cyrano de Bergerac	Edmond Rostand	Denis Podalydès	
2011	A Streetcar Named Desire	Tennessee Williams	Lee Breuer	
2011	The Merry Wives of Windsor	William Shakespeare	Andrés Lima	
2011-12	Poil de carotte	Jules Renard	Philippe Lagrue	
2012	Cassé	Rémi de Vos	Christophe Rauck	
2012-14	Flowers for Algernon	Daniel Keyes	Anne Kessler	Molière Award for Best One Man Show; Palmarès du théâtre - Best Comedian
2015	Victor	Henri Bernstein	Rachida Brakni	
2017	Family Resemblances	Jean-Pierre Bacri & Agnès Jaoui	Agnès Jaoui	
2017	Cuisine et dépendances	Jean-Pierre Bacri & Agnès Jaoui	Agnès Jaoui	
2018	Manine	Zina & Marie Modiano	Adrien de Van	
2018	La Musica deuxième	Marguerite Duras	Jacques Weber	
2021	Flowers for Algernon	Daniel Keyes	Anne Kessler	

== Filmography ==
Year	Title	Role	Director	Notes
2002	Le chignon d'Olga	Gregoire's brother	Jérôme Bonnell	
2004	Pilou		Claudine Natkin	Short
2005	La blessure	Cop Z.A.P.I.	Nicolas Klotz	
2005	Les yeux clairs	The doctor	Jérôme Bonnell	
2005	Les âmes grises	Rifolon	Yves Angelo	
2005	Un truc dans le genre	The electrician	Alexandre Ciolek	
2005	D'Artagnan et les trois mousquetaires	Porthos	Pierre Aknine	TV mini-series
2006	L'école pour tous	The cop	Éric Rochant	
2007	Le dernier gang	Bonner	Ariel Zeitoun	
2007	Très bien, merci	Café's owner	Emmanuelle Cuau	
2007	Have Mercy on Us All	Bordenave	Régis Wargnier	
2007	Sur ses deux oreilles	Jack	Emma Luchini	Short
2008	Go Fast	John Wahl	Olivier Van Hoofstadt	
2008	Capitaine Achab	The guardian	Philippe Ramos	
2008	Frontier of the Dawn	Carole's friend	Philippe Garrel	
2008	A Day at the Museum	Georges Paulin	Jean-Michel Ribes	
2008	The Last Deadly Mission	Young Charles Subra	Olivier Marchal	
2008	Chez Maupassant	The butler	Olivier Schatzky	TV series (1 episode)
2009	Marcher	The barman	Jeanne Herry	Short
2009	Un village français	Garnier	Philippe Triboit	TV series (1 episode)
2010	Angel & Tony	Tony Vialet	Alix Delaporte	César Award for Most Promising Actor; Nominated - Lumière Award for Most Promising Actor
2010	An Ordinary Execution	Head of service	Marc Dugain	
2010	Gainsbourg: A Heroic Life	Phyphy	Joann Sfar	
2010	Hymen	Pierrick	Cédric Prévost	Short
2010	L'accordeur	Simon	Olivier Treiner	Short
2011	La Ligne droite	Vincent	Régis Wargnier	
2011	The Woman in the Fifth	Lieutenant Children Unit	Paweł Pawlikowski	
2011	Micha Mouse	The producer	Mathieu Busson	Short
2011	La part de Franck	Franck	Dominique Baumard	Short
2011	Rituels meurtriers	Gillet	Olivier Guignard	TV movie
2011	La bonté des femmes	Alex	Yves Angelo & Marc Dugain	TV movie
2011	Drumont, histoire d'un antisémite français	Devos	Emmanuel Bourdieu	TV movie
2012	Augustine	Charcot's guest	Alice Winocour	
2012	Coming Home	Frank	Frédéric Videau	
2012	Goodbye Morocco	Fersen	Nadir Moknèche	
2012	Farewell, My Queen	Louis, comte de Provence	Benoît Jacquot	
2012	Je me suis fait tout petit	The headmaster	Cécilia Rouaud	
2012	La Ville Lumière	Versini	Pascal Tessaud	Short
2012	Rapace	George Fall	Claire Devers	TV movie
2012	Clémenceau	Georges Wormser	Olivier Guignard	TV movie
2012	Berthe Morisot	Durand	Caroline Champetier	TV movie
2012	Chien de guerre	Mickaël	Fabrice Cazeneuve	TV movie
2012-15	The Returned	Toni Garrel	Fabrice Gobert, Frédéric Goupil, ...	TV series (16 episodes)
2013	One of a Kind	Frédi	François Dupeyron	Nominated - César Award for Best Actor; Nominated - Globes de Cristal Award for Best Actor
2013	Le prochain film	The physio	René Féret	
2013	Pop Redemption	JP	Martin Le Gall	
2013	Géraldine je t'aime	Samuel	Emmanuel Courcol	Short
2013	Portraits de maîtresses		Rocco Labbé	Short
2013	Une femme dans la Révolution	Georges Danton	Jean-Daniel Verhaeghe	TV mini-series
2013	Alias Caracalla, au coeur de la Résistance	Léo	Alain Tasma	TV mini-series
2014	Brèves de comptoir	Taxi driver	Jean-Michel Ribes	
2014	Des fleurs pour Algernon	Charlie Gordon	Yves Angelo	TV movie Luchon International Film Festival - Best Actor
2015	Heat Wave	Rodolphe Blin	Raphaël Jacoulot	
2015	Au plus près du Soleil	Olivier Poncet	Yves Angelo	
2015	The Last Hammer Blow	Samuel Rovinski	Alix Delaporte	
2016	The Jews	Talmudist	Yvan Attal	
2016	Open at Night	Marcel	Édouard Baer	
2016	Cessez-le-feu	Marcel Laffont	Emmanuel Courcol	
2016	Seances		Guy Maddin	Short
2016	Monsieur Hernst	Monsieur Hernst	Vincent Cappello	Short
2016	Demain si j'y suis	Marcus Amakouka	Marie Amachoukeli & Vladimir Mavounia-Kouka	TV series (1 episode)
2017	Redoubtable	Michel Cournot	Michel Hazanavicius	
2017	Nos patriotes	Gauthier	Gabriel Le Bomin	
2017	Endangered Species	Joseph Kaufman	Gilles Bourdos	
2017	Reinventing Marvin	Dany Bijoux	Anne Fontaine	
2017	On l'appelait Ruby	Max	Laurent Tuel	TV movie
2018	Simon	Franck	René Féret	
2018	Raoul Taburin	Raoul's father	Pierre Godeau	
2018	In Safe Hands	PFS Head of Service	Jeanne Herry	
2018	Nothing to Hide	Ben	Fred Cavayé	
2018	Naked Normandy	Roger	Philippe Le Guay	
2018	Pauvre Georges!	Georges Maurin	Claire Devers	
2019	An Officer and a Spy	Hubert-Joseph Henry	Roman Polanski	Nominated - César Award for Best Supporting Actor
2019	Pile poil	Christophe Duvivier	Lauriane Escaffre & Yvonnick Muller	Short
2020	Night Shift	Erik	Anne Fontaine	
2021	Delicious	Pierre Manceron	Éric Besnard	
2021	Chère Léa	Mathieu	Jérôme Bonnell	
2021	Presidents	François	Anne Fontaine	
2021	Everything Went Fine	Gérard Boisrond	François Ozon	
2021	Waiting for Bojangles	Charles "l'Ordure"	Régis Roinsard	
2021	Le Trésor du Petit Nicolas	M. Lebon "Le Bouillon"	Julien Rappeneau	
2022	L'enfant	Pierre	Marguerite de Hillerin & Félix Dutilloy-Liégeois	
2022	Final Cut	Philippe Rolland	Michel Hazanavicius	
2022	Maria rêve	Hubert	Lauriane Escaffre & Yvo Muller	
2022	The Sitting Duck	Gilles Hugo	Jean-Paul Salomé	
2022	Histoire de Prison	Charlie	Vincent Elbaz	TV movie
2022	Julia(s)	Pierre Feynman	Olivier Treiner	
2023	Les choses simples	Pierre	Éric Besnard	
2023	A Prince	Narrator	Pierre Creton	
2023	La fiancée du poète	Bernard	Yolande Moreau	
2023	Coup de chance	Inspector Henri Delauny	Woody Allen	
2024	Paternel	Simon	Ronan Tronchot	
2024	This Is the Goat!	Cardinal Mazarin	Fred Cavayé	
2024	Le fil	Nicolas Milik	Daniel Auteuil	Post-Production
2024	Louise Violet		Éric Besnard	Post-Production
2025	Asterix and Obelix: The Big Fight	Cassius Ceramix (voice)	Alain Chabat	TV miniseries
2026	Women on Trial (L'Affaire Marie-Claire)	Claude Faux	Lauriane Escaffre, Yvo Muller	
TBA	Valjean	Jean Valjean	Éric Besnard	Filming
