= The Day After (2014 film) =

2014 drama film by Adolf Alix Jr.

- Released movie poster
- Directed by: Adolf Alix Jr..
- Written by: Jerry Gracio
- Produced by: Adolf Alix Jr.; Lou Gopez; Emily Pacheco
- Starring: Nora Aunor; Alden Richards; Rosanna Roces
- Production company: Phoenix Features
- Release dates: November 24, 2014 (HIFF); August 7, 2015 (Cinemalaya)
- Running time: 16 minutes
- Country: Philippines
- Language: Filipino

The Day After (Filipino: Kinabukasan) is a 2014 Philippine drama short film co-produced and directed by Adolfo Alix Jr. and written by Jerry Gracio. It stars Nora Aunor, Alden Richards and Rosanna Roces.

== Synopsis ==
Ernest, an elderly woman is trying to move on from a painful loss, when someone from the past, turns up at her house. A young man named Niles has questions and Ernest has to help him find the answers that he is looking for.

== Cast ==
- Nora Aunor as Ernest
- Alden Richards as Niles
- Rosanna Roces as Sam

== Production ==
The movie shooting location was in an old house near Balete Drive, New House in Quezon City in February 2014. Alix Jr. asked Jerry Gracio to write the script for, The Day After. The movie marks the first short film made by Adolfo Alix Jr., Nora Aunor and Alden Richards.

== Release ==
The film was screened on November 24, 2014 at 3rd Hanoi International Film Festival in Vietnam and at the 11th Cinemalaya Independent Film Festival from August 7-15, 2015 at the Cultural Center of the Philippines (CCP) Theater, Pasay City. The movie was also screened at Singapore International Film Festival from December 4-14, 2014.

The movie was rereleased on October 18, 2017 at Ayala cinemas.

== Accolades ==
Accolades received by Hello, Love, Goodbye
Organization	Year	Category	Recipient(s)	Result	Ref.
Hanoi International Film Festival	2014	Best Short Film	The Day After	Nominated	
Gawad Urian Award	2015	Best Short Film	The Day After	Won	
