= Poon (film) =

- Theatrical release poster
- Directed by: Adolfo Alix Jr.
- Written by: Jerry Grácio
- Starring: Ronaldo Valdez; Gina Pareño; Jaclyn Jose; Janice de Belen; Lotlot de Leon; Ara Mina
- Cinematography: TM Malones
- Production companies: Banana Entertainment, C-Frame Production
- Release dates: April 16, 2026 (MIFF); September 9, 2026
- Country: Philippines
- Language: Filipino

The Hallowed (Filipino: Poon) is a horror drama film directed by Adolfo Alix Jr. Written by Jerry Grácio, it centers on the horror that ensues on a family as they resolve issues surrounding them. The film stars an ensemble cast led by Ronaldo Valdez (in his final film role), Gina Pareño, Jaclyn Jose (also in her final film role), Janice de Belen, Lotlot de Leon, and Ara Mina.

== Premise ==
Supernatural occurrences and drama unfold at the Mentirosos household as they resolve issues surrounding the family.

== Cast ==
- Ronaldo Valdez as Peping
  - Martin del Rosario as young Peping
- Gina Pareño as Berta
  - Elora Españo as young Berta
- Jaclyn Jose as Sol
- Janice de Belen as Ria
- Lotlot de Leon as Adele
- Ara Mina as Mae
- Allen Dizon as Daniel
- JC de Vera as Richard
- Bembol Roco as SP01 Michael Datuin
- Will Ashley as Carlo
- Kelvin Miranda as Benok
- Althea Ablan as Faye
- Joao Constancia as Austin
- Rico Barrera as Alvin
- Nella Dizon as Mariz
- Iyah Mina as Gandara
- Kristel Moreno as Jane

== Development ==
Poon was first announced in 2023. Following the sudden death of Jaclyn Jose in 2024, her sister Veronica Jones assumed the role of a fake Shemp to finish Jose's unfinished scenes.

== Release ==
The film had its world premiere at the 48th Moscow International Film Festival, alongside Alix Jr.'s other film Pila, on April 16–23, 2026. Its domestic release was on September 9.
