= Two Women (2014 film) =

2014 film by Vera Glagoleva

- Film poster
- Directed by: Vera Glagoleva
- Screenplay by: Svetlana Grudovich; Olga Pogodina-Kuzmina
- Based on: A Month in the Country; 1872 play by Ivan Turgenev
- Produced by: Natalya Ivanova
- Starring: Anna Brenner-Vartanyan; Ralph Fiennes; Aleksandr Baluev
- Cinematography: Gints Berzins
- Edited by: Aleksandr Amirov
- Music by: Sergei Banevich
- Production company: Horosho Production House
- Release date: August 2014 (Window to Europe Film Festival)
- Running time: 117 minutes
- Country: Russia
- Language: Russian
- Budget: € 2,860,000

Two Women (Russian: Две женщины, Dve zhenshchiny) is a 2014 Russian drama film directed by Vera Glagoleva, starring Ralph Fiennes and Sylvie Testud. It is based on Ivan Turgenev's 1872 play A Month in the Country (originally written as Two Women in 1855).

== Plot ==
At the heart of the play lies a love quadrangle. Natalya Petrovna, wife of the rich landowner Arkady Sergeich Islaev, falls in love with Alexey Nikolayevich Belyaev, a student and tutor to Kolya Islaev, her son.

Mikhail Aleksandrovich Rakitin - a friend of the family, has long loved Natalya Petrovna. Verochka, Natalya Petrovna's ward, also falls in love with Kolya's tutor Alexey. Belyaev and Rakitin eventually leave the estate ...

== Cast ==
- Anna Vartanyan-Astrakhantseva (ru) as Natalya Petrovna Islaeva
- Ralph Fiennes as Mikhail Aleksandrovich Rakitin
- Aleksandr Baluev as Arkady Sergeich Islaev
- Sylvie Testud as Elisavetta Bogdanovna
- Anna Levanova as Verochka
- Nikita Volkov as Alexey Nikolayevich Belyaev
- Larisa Malevannaya as Anna Semenovna Islaeva
- Bernd Moss as Schaaf
- Sergey Yushkevich as Ignaty Shpigelsky
- Vasiliy Mishchenko as Bolshentsov
- Anna Nahapetova as Katya

== Reception ==
Two Women has an approval rating of 89% on review aggregator website Rotten Tomatoes, based on 9 reviews, and an average rating of 6.00/10. It also has a score of 54 out of 100 on Metacritic, based on 4 critics, indicating "mixed or average reviews".

Clarence Tsui of The Hollywood Reporter wrote:

Fiennes' superficial turn (in more ways than one, as his lines ended up overdubbed by a Russian voice actor) is hampered more by circumstances than ability: rather than playing on the multiple possibilities underlining Turgenev's once-transgressive comedy of manners, actress-turned-filmmaker Vera Glagoleva's 21st century take is a po-faced, straitjacketed affair, as she (and her screenwriters Svetlana Grudovich and Olga Pogodina-Kuzima) play out the entangled relationships as excessively affected period drama. While certainly lushly mounted, Two Women is at best a piece of dated heritage cinema, and at worst cliche-ridden pomp.

=== Awards and nominations ===
The film won the Best Feature Film award at the 3rd Hanoi International Film Festival.
