= Line of Credit (film) =

- Directed by: Salome Alexi
- Written by: Salome Alexi
- Starring: Nino Kasradze
- Cinematography: Jean-Louis Padis
- Edited by: Salome Alexi
- Music by: Rezo Kiknadze
- Release date: August 31, 2014 (Venice)
- Running time: 125 minutes
- Country: Georgia

Line of Credit (Georgian: კრედიტის ლიმიტი) is a 2014 made in Georgia, it is a comedy-drama film written and directed by Salomé Alexi. It was screened in the Horizons section at the 71st Venice International Film Festival.

== Cast ==
- Nino Kasradze
- Zanda Ioseliani
- Ana Kacheishvili
- Bacho Chkheidze
- Nino Arsenishvili
- Tamar Mamulaishvili
- David Darchia
- Giorgi Kipiani
- Tatuli Dolidze
- Tamaz Tevzadze
- Liza Kalandaze
