= Return to Ithaca (film) =

2014 film

- Theatrical release poster
- Directed by: Laurent Cantet
- Written by: Laurent Cantet; Lucia Lopez Coll; François Crozade; Leonardo Padura
- Produced by: Laurent Baudens; Didar Domehri; Gaël Nouaille
- Starring: Jorge Perugorría; Isabel Santos
- Cinematography: Diego Dussuel
- Edited by: Robin Campillo
- Production companies: Full House; Orange Studio; Haut et Court; Panache Productions; Funny Balloons; La Compagnie Cinématographique
- Distributed by: Haut et Court
- Release dates: 31 August 2014 (Venice); 3 December 2014 (France)
- Running time: 95 minutes
- Country: France
- Language: Spanish
- Budget: €1.2 million
- Box office: $218,537

Return to Ithaca (French: Retour à Ithaque) is a 2014 comedy-drama film directed by Laurent Cantet. The film premiered at the 71st Venice International Film Festival. It was screened in the Special Presentations section of the 2014 Toronto International Film Festival.

== Plot ==
Five friends reunite on a rooftop terrace in Havana to celebrate the return of Amadeo after his 16 years of self-exile in Spain. During the night, they sing, dance, reflect the past and make sense of the present.

== Cast ==
- Jorge Perugorría as Eddy
- Isabel Santos as Tania
- Fernando Hechavarría as Rafa
- Néstor Jiménez as Amadeo
- Pedro Julio Díaz Ferran as Aldo

== Accolades ==
The film won the Venice Days Award at the 71st Venice International Film Festival.
