= María Fux =

Argentine dancer (1922–2023)

Maria Fux
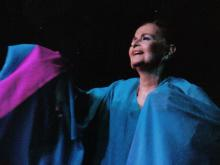
- Born: 2 January 1922; Buenos Aires, Argentina
- Died: 31 July 2023 (aged 101)
- Occupations: Dancer, choreographer, dance therapist, dance school owner

María Fux (2 January 1922 – 31 July 2023) was an Argentine dancer, choreographer, and dance therapist. She developed a dance therapy system, in Argentina, later establishing dance schools in Argentina and Europe, training physiotherapists, occupational therapists, speech therapists, doctors, teachers of dance and of gymnastics, psychotherapists, psychologists, and teachers working with people with disabilities.

Fux was invited to institutions, conferences, and seminars to witness their experiences with issues related to deafness, Down syndrome, intellectual disabilities, autistic individuals, elderly, and various other disabilities. She turned 100 in January 2022, and died on 31 July 2023, at the age of 101.

== Awards ==
- Diploma, UNESCO (1996)
- Recognition from UN (1999)
- Illustrious citizen of the city (2002)
- Gratia Artis Award (2007)
- Silver Clover Award, Rotary (2008)
- Bicentennial Medal (2010)
- National Endowment for the Arts Award (2011)
- Rosa Silver Award of Congress (2012)

== Selected works ==
Fux published several books, which have been translated into Italian and Portuguese:

- Fux, María (1982). Primer encuentro con la danzaterapia (in Spanish). Paidós. p. 149. ISBN 978-950-12-4415-1.
- Fux, María (1997). La formación del danzaterapeuta (in Spanish). Gedisa. p. 112. ISBN 9788474326413.
- Fux, María (1998). Danzaterapia: Fragmentos de vida (in Spanish). Lumen Argentina. p. 128. ISBN 978-950-724-724-8.
- Fux, María (1999). Danza, experiencia de vida (in Spanish). Ediciones Paidós Ibérica. p. 128. ISBN 978-968-853-361-1.
- Fux, María (2001). Después de la caída... ¡continúo con la Danzaterapia! (in Spanish). Lumen Argentina. p. 94. ISBN 978-987-00-0056-3.
- Fux, María (2005). Qué es la danzaterapia, preguntas que tienen respuesta (in Spanish). Lumen. p. 72. ISBN 9789870003519.
- Fux, María (2007). Ser danzaterapeuta hoy (in Spanish). Lumen Argentina. p. 120. ISBN 978-987-00-0692-3.
- Fux, María (2009). Imágenes de la danzaterapia (in Spanish). Lumen Argentina. p. 40. ISBN 978-987-00-0875-0.
- Fux, María (2013). El Color es Movimiento (in Spanish). Papers Editores. p. 109. ISBN 978-987-1274-20-8.

== See also ==
- Dancing with Maria
