= Alix Delaporte =

French film director and screenwriter

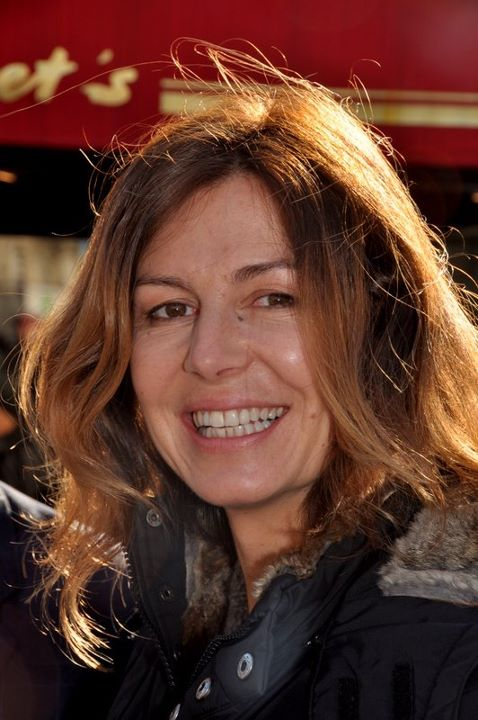
- Alix Delaporte in 2012
- Born: 1969 (age 56–57); Chatou, France
- Occupations: Film director, screenwriter
- Years active: 2001–present

Alix Delaporte (born 1969) is a French film director and screenwriter.

== Life and career ==
Delaporte studied at the London School of Economics between 1988 and 1989, and in 1993, she obtained a master's degree in contemporary history. While attending a screenwriting workshop at La Fémis from 1999 to 2000, Delaporte worked as a reporter and cameraperson at the CAPA Agency and collaborated on a number of television shows. In 2006, her short film How Do You Brake Going Downhill? (Comment on freine dans une descente ?) was screened at the 63rd Venice International Film Festival, where it won the Silver Lion for Best Short Film. In 2012, her debut feature film Angel & Tony earned three nominations at the 37th César Awards and won newcomer awards for lead actors Clotilde Hesme and Grégory Gadebois. Her next film, The Last Hammer Blow, played in competition at the 71st Venice International Film Festival. Romain Paul, who played the son of Clothilde Hesme and Grégory Gadebois' characters, won the Marcello Mastroianni Award for his performance in the film.

In 2015, she was part of the jury for the Horizons section of the 72nd Venice International Film Festival.

== Filmography ==
Year	Title	Credited as		Notes
Year	Title	Director	Screenwriter	Notes
2001	Comme dans un rêve	Yes		Documentary film
2003	The Trap	Yes	Yes	Short film
2004	Lea Parker		Yes	TV series
2004	Plus belle la vie		Yes	TV series
2006	How Do You Brake Going Downhill?	Yes	Yes	Short film Silver Lion for Best Short Film
2006	Zinedine Zidane - Son Parcours	Yes		Documentary film
2007	Zidane : Le Dernier Match	Yes		Documentary film
2008	Fortunes		Yes	Telefilm
2010	Angel & Tony	Yes	Yes	Deauville American Film Festival - Prix Michel d'Ornano; Nominated—César Award for Best First Feature Film
2011	Fortunes		Yes	TV series
2014	The Last Hammer Blow	Yes	Yes	71st Venice International Film Festival - Laterna Magica Prize; Nominated—71st Venice International Film Festival - Golden Lion
2023	Vivants	Yes	Yes	Drama film
