= Angel & Tony =

2010 film

- Film poster
- Directed by: Alix Delaporte
- Written by: Alix Delaporte; Alain Le Henry
- Produced by: Hélène Cases
- Starring: Clotilde Hesme; Grégory Gadebois
- Cinematography: Claire Mathon
- Edited by: Louise Decelle
- Music by: Mathieu Maestracci
- Production company: Lionceau Films
- Distributed by: Pyramide Distribution
- Release dates: September 2010 (Venice); 26 January 2011 (France)
- Running time: 83 minutes
- Country: France
- Language: French
- Budget: $1.3 million
- Box office: $2 million

Angel & Tony (French: Angèle et Tony) is a 2010 French drama film directed by Alix Delaporte. It tells the story of a young widow in a desperate situation who not only wins the respect of her employer, his family and his community but also regains her estranged son.

The film premiered in the International Critics' Week section at the 67th Venice International Film Festival. It received three César Award nominations and won two: Most Promising Actress for Clotilde Hesme and Most Promising Actor for Grégory Gadebois.

== Plot ==
Existing by petty thieving and open-air sex, the penniless Angèle answers a job ad from the taciturn Tony. He lives with his widowed mother Myriam and runs a fishing boat with his brother out of the harbour at Port-en-Bessin. Over his mother's opposition, he gives Angèle a job helping Myriam sell the catch in the fish market and a room in their house. More than once Angèle offers him immediate sex, but that is not his idea of a relationship.

Bit by bit, details of Angèle's past start emerging. She is just out from a two-year stint in prison for the death of her husband, which she claims was an accident. Her estranged son Yohan is in the custody of her in-laws, who despise her. She wants to regain him, but will have to show that she has a fixed address, a steady job and is in a stable relationship.

Slowly she gets better at her work and begins to win some respect from Tony and his family, to which sympathy is added when they learn that she has a son she wants to regain. She gets involved in community activities and during rehearsals for a children's play she and Tony have an enjoyable tumble backstage. A day is set and on the morning of the wedding she is overjoyed to find that her father-in-law has brought Yohan, who thinks he would now prefer to live with Angèle and Tony.

== Cast ==
- Clotilde Hesme as Angèle
- Grégory Gadebois as Tony
- Évelyne Didi as Myriam
- Jérôme Huguet as Ryan
- Antoine Couleau as Yohan
- Patrick Descamps as Yohan's grandfather
- Lola Dueñas as Anabel
- Corine Marienneau as Yohan's grandmother
