= Au plus près du Soleil =

- Film poster
- Directed by: Yves Angelo
- Written by: Yves Angelo; François Dupeyron; Gilles Legrand
- Produced by: Frédéric Brillion; Gilles Legrand
- Starring: Sylvie Testud; Grégory Gadebois; Mathilde Bisson; Zacharie Chasseriaud
- Cinematography: Pierre-Hugues Galien
- Edited by: Fabrice Rouaud
- Production company: Epithète Films
- Distributed by: BAC Films
- Release dates: 28 August 2015 (Angoulême); 9 September 2015 (France)
- Running time: 103 minutes
- Country: France
- Language: French
- Budget: $4.8 million
- Box office: $110.000

Au plus près du Soleil is a 2015 French drama film directed by Yves Angelo and co-written by Angelo, François Dupeyron and Gilles Legrand.

== Plot ==
Investigating magistrate Sophie learns that Juliette, a woman who she is questioning in regard to an ongoing case, is the biological mother of Léo, her adopted son. Despite her magistrate husband Olivier's disapproval, Sophie refuses to withdraw from the case so that she can continue her probe into Juliette, whilst hiding the truth from Léo. Appalled by Sophie's decision, Olivier decides to secretly approach Juliette without revealing his true identity.

== Cast ==
- Sylvie Testud as Sophie Picard
- Grégory Gadebois as Olivier Poncet
- Mathilde Bisson as Juliette Larrain
- Zacharie Chasseriaud as Léo Poncet
- John Arnold as Pierre
- Pascal Ternisien as The accused man
- Thomas Doret as The accused man's son
