= The Last Hammer Blow =

2014 film

- Film poster
- Directed by: Alix Delaporte
- Written by: Alix Delaporte; Alain Le Henry
- Produced by: Hélène Cases
- Starring: Romain Paul; Clotilde Hesme; Grégory Gadebois
- Cinematography: Claire Mathon
- Edited by: Louise Decelle
- Music by: Evgueni Galperine; Sacha Galperine
- Distributed by: Pyramide Distribution
- Release dates: 3 September 2014 (Venice); 11 March 2015 (France)
- Running time: 82 minutes
- Country: France
- Language: French
- Budget: $4.4 million
- Box office: $287.000

The Last Hammer Blow (French: Le Dernier Coup de marteau) is a 2014 French drama film directed by Alix Delaporte. It was selected to compete for the Golden Lion at the 71st Venice International Film Festival where Romain Paul won the Marcello Mastroianni Award for Best New Young Actor.

== Cast ==
- Romain Paul as Victor
- Clotilde Hesme as Nadia
- Grégory Gadebois as Samuel
- Candela Peña as Maria
- Tristán Ulloa as Fabio
- Farid Bendali as Omar
- Mireia Vilapuig as Luna
- Víctor Sánchez as Miguel

== Accolades ==
Award / Film Festival	Category	Recipients and nominees	Result
Lumière Awards	Best Cinematography	Claire Mathon	Nominated
Venice International Film Festival	Marcello Mastroianni Award for Best New Young Actor or Actress	Romain Paul	Won
Venice International Film Festival	Lanterna Magica (CGS) Award	Alix Delaporte	Won
