= Dancing with Maria =

- Film poster
- Directed by: Ivan Gergolet
- Written by: Ivan Gergolet
- Produced by: Igor Prinčič
- Starring: María Fux
- Cinematography: Ivan Gergolet, David Rubio
- Edited by: Natalie Cristiani
- Music by: Luca Ciut
- Release date: 2 September 2014 (Venice)
- Running time: 72 minutes
- Countries: Italy, Argentina, Slovenia
- Language: Spanish

Dancing with Maria is a 2014 Italian documentary film directed by Ivan Gergolet. It was presented at the International Critics' Week of 71st Venice International Film Festival.

The film is about María Fux, a 90 years old Argentinian dancer, choreographer, and dance therapist. The film shows the activities carried out by Maria in the studio arranged in her home in Buenos Aires, with people with different extraction and disabilities.

It was in the nominations for the documentary category of 28th European Film Awards in 2015.
