= Open at Night =

- Theatrical release poster
- Ouvert la nuit
- Directed by: Édouard Baer
- Written by: Édouard Baer; Benoît Graffin
- Produced by: Barka Hjij
- Starring: Édouard Baer; Sabrina Ouazani; Audrey Tautou
- Cinematography: Yves Angelo
- Edited by: Hervé de Luze
- Music by: Alain Souchon
- Production companies: Les Films en cabine Cinéfrance
- Distributed by: Le Pacte
- Release dates: 26 August 2016 (Angoulême); 11 January 2017 (France)
- Running time: 100 minutes
- Country: France
- Language: French
- Budget: $4.2 million
- Box office: $708.000

Open at Night (original title: Ouvert la nuit) is a 2016 French comedy-drama film written and directed by Édouard Baer and starring Baer, Sabrina Ouazani and Audrey Tautou. It was released on 11 January 2017.

== Cast ==
- Édouard Baer as Luigi
- Sabrina Ouazani as Faeza
- Audrey Tautou as Nawel
- Christophe Meynet as Chris
- Jean-Michel Lahmi as Théo
- Grégory Gadebois as Marcel
- Patrick Boshart as Monsieur Pat
- Marie-Ange Casta as Clara
- Alka Balbir as Karine
- Lionel Abelanski as Lolo
- Atmen Kélif as Kamel
- Christine Murillo as Madame Pelissier
- Michel Galabru as himself
- Yoshi Oida as Atsuhiko Dazai
- Michel Fau as Bar manager
- Guilaine Londez as The guardian
