= Nguyễn Hoàng Điệp =

Vietnamese filmmaker (born 1982)

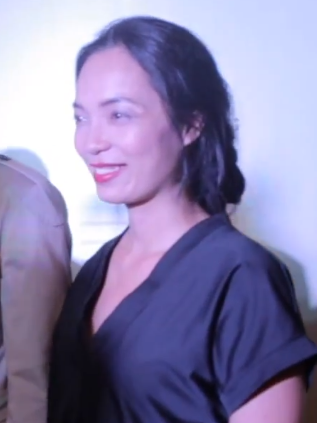
- Nguyen Hoang Diep in 2015
- Born: June 27, 1982 (age 44); Hanoi, Vietnam
- Occupations: Filmmaker; businessperson
- Notable work: Flapping in the Middle of Nowhere

Nguyễn Hoàng Điệp (born 27 June 1982) is a Vietnamese filmmaker and businesswoman. She is widely known as the director of the film Flapping in the Middle of Nowhere (2014) – a work that competed at many international film festivals such as the Venice Film Festival, AFI Film Festival, and the Three Continents Festival, and helped her win the Best Director award at the Bratislava International Film Festival. In addition to being a director, Nguyen Hoang Diep also participates in supporting independent film projects of young Vietnamese filmmakers like Bi! Don't Be Afraid (2010) and Ròm (2019).

Nguyen Hoang Diep was awarded the Order of Literature and Arts by the French government. She is also the founder of Ơ kìa Hà Nội, a creative space with the purpose of connecting art and life, artists and the public. From 2021, Nguyen Hoang Diep will take on the role of a member of the Central Council for appraisal and classification of feature films of the Vietnam Cinema Department, term 2021–2023.

== Early life ==
Nguyen Hoang Diep was born on 27 June 1982 in Hanoi. She studied literature at Hanoi – Amsterdam High School. After graduating high school, she entered the Hanoi University of Theater and Cinema and was the valedictorian of the Directing Department.

== Career ==
=== 2005–2009: First short film and teen drama ===
Nguyen Hoang Diep started her career with her first short film titled Mùa thứ 5 (2005), which was her graduation work at Hanoi University of Theater and Cinema. The script of Mùa thứ 5 won a prize in a short film script writing contest organized by TPD Movie studio, and then Nguyen Hoang Diep – the author of the script, was a senior student at the time – was funded to make the short film. The work was later selected for the competition round of the Rio de Janeiro International Short Film Festival in 2005. In 2006, the film won Third Prize at the 2005 National Short Film Competition.

In 2008, Nguyen Hoang Diep was invited to take on the role of co-director for the teen drama series Chit and Pi, with Nguyen Quang Hai as general director. The television series has 26 episodes and has been broadcast on VTC1 channel since May 2008. Remembering the experiences from Chit and Pi, she continued to take on the role of director in another short television project for teenagers, Bộ tứ 10A8, broadcast from June 2009 on VTV3 channel. The TV series received many mixed opinions from the audience.

=== 2010–present: Flapping in the Middle of Nowhere and independent film projects ===
In 2009, Nguyen Hoang Diep participated in the project Bi! Don't Be Afraid as a film producer, working directly with director Phan Dang Di. The work has been submitted to nearly 40 international film festivals and won major awards at these film festivals. The film had a limited release in Vietnam from March 18, 2011. After three days of release in Vietnam, the film attracted more than 3,000 audiences to watch.

After the Bi! Don't Be Afraid project, as a producer, Nguyen Hoang Diep began to focus on her first film project titled Flapping Wings.

== Personal life ==
Nguyen Hoang Diep has two children. She is also the founder of Ơ kìa Hà Nội, a creative space with the purpose of connecting art and life, artists and the public. From 2021, Nguyen Hoang Diep took on the role of a member of the Central Council for appraising and classifying feature films of the Vietnam Cinema Department, for the term 2021–2023. Nguyen Hoang Diep was also awarded the Order of Literature and Arts by the French government.

== Filmography ==
=== Films ===
| Year | Title | Roles | | | Note |
| Year | Title | Director | Producer | Screenplay | Note |
|---|---|---|---|---|---|
| 2005 | Mùa thứ 5 | Yes | Yes | Yes | Short film |
| 2010 | Bi! Don't Be Afraid | No | Yes | No | |
| 2012 | Hai, tư, sáu | Yes | Yes | Yes | Short film |
| 2014 | Flapping in the Middle of Nowhere | Yes | Yes | Yes | Directional debut |
| 2019 | Ròm | No | Yes | No | |

=== Series ===
| Năm | Title |
|---|---|
| 2008 | Chít và Pi |
| 2009–2010 | Bộ tứ 10A8 |
