= Valasse Cross =

Medieval reliquary processional cross

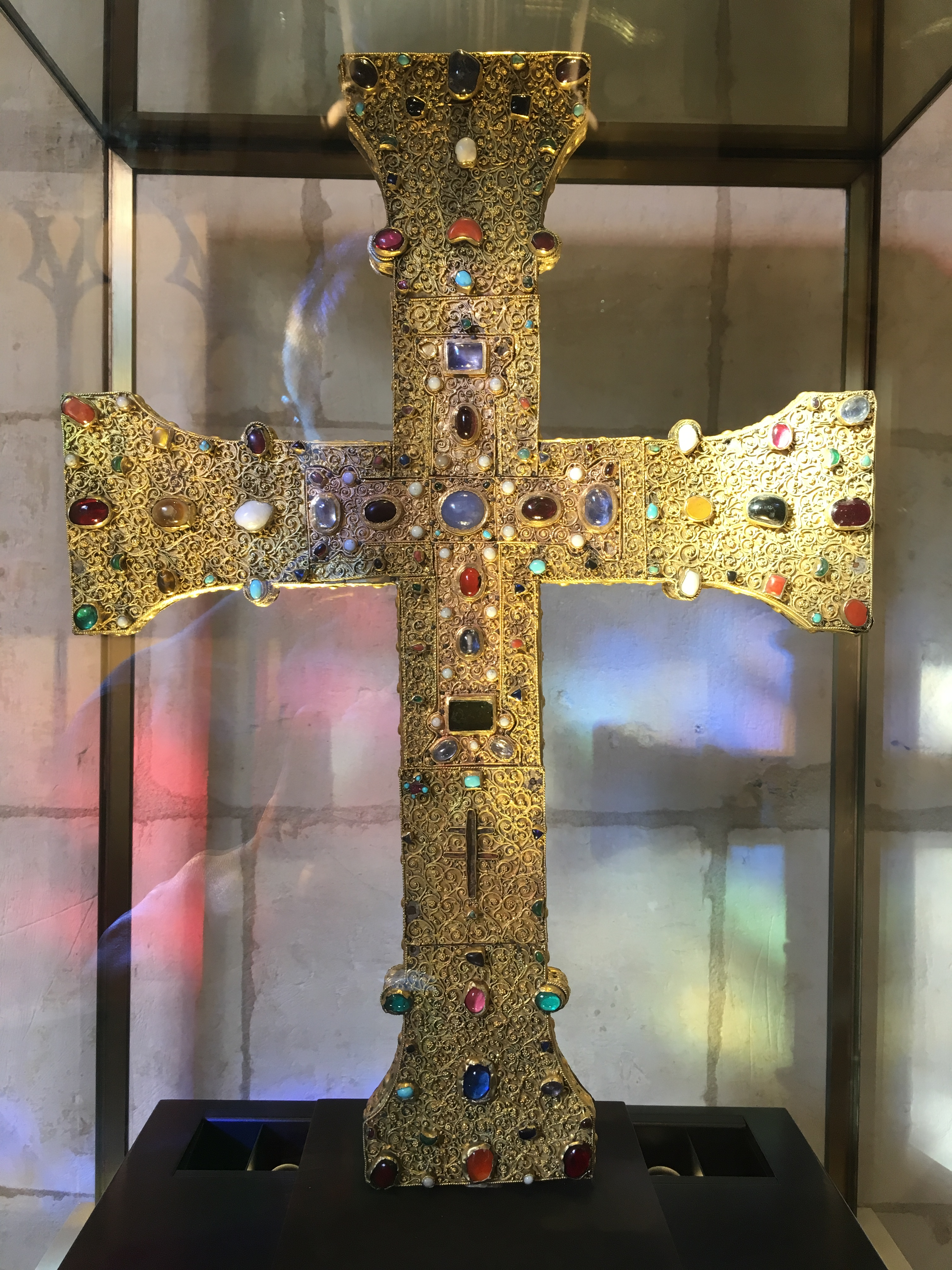
The Valasse Cross

The Valasse Cross is a Medieval gold cross reliquary, associated with the Empress Matilda. It is an Ottonian processional cross in the crux gemmata style.

== History ==
It was made in what is now Germany or Italy between the 11th-century and the start of the 12th. The cross is ornamented with precious stones from India, Iran, Egypt and the Mediterranean. It is in the form of a Latin cross with extremities enlarged, and with a cross within a cross.

The larger outer cross was made in the 1180s, and is contemporaneous with the Coronation Spoon. The smaller cross, set within the larger, is the one associated with the Empress Matilda, and has been dated to the 11th-century. The cross contains a relic of the True Cross, set in wax at the front.

The cross became the property of the Cistercian Valasse Abbey, which had been founded by the Empress Matilda in 1156/7. It is likely that Matilda’s son Henry II gave the cross to the abbey.

The cross was acquired by the Musée des Antiquités de Rouen in 1843. In 1846 Jean-Benoît Cochet wrote that the cross was not an altar cross, but rather a processional one. Jean-François Brianchon recounted that it was rescued from destruction by a parishioner who presented the cross to Jacques-François Begouën when he acquired the abbey in 1792.

== Exhibitions ==
It was displayed in 2023 at the Musée des Beaux-Arts – Musée Beauvoisine.

It is on display at St John's Chapel in the White Tower in the Tower of London from March 2025 to January 2026, on loan from the Musée des Antiquités de Rouen.
