= Claire Mathon =

French cinematographer (born 1975)

- Born: 1975 (age 50–51)
- Occupation: Cinematographer
- Years active: 1999–present

Claire Mathon (born 1975) is a French cinematographer. Her work includes The Queen of Hearts, Going South, and Stranger by the Lake. Mathon photographed Portrait of a Lady on Fire, for which she received a César Award for Best Cinematography.

== Career ==
She studied film at the École nationale supérieure Louis-Lumière and graduated in 1998. Since then, she has worked on several short films, documentaries and feature films. She was nominated for the César Award for Best Cinematography for the film Stranger by the Lake.

In 2019, Mathon won the Los Angeles Film Critics Association Award for Best Cinematography for her work on the films Atlantics and Portrait of a Lady on Fire.

Mathon also won the Lumière Award for Best Cinematography and the César Award for Best Cinematography for Portrait of a Lady on Fire.

== Filmography ==
=== Feature films ===
Year	Title	Notes
2006	Horezon	
2006	Pardonnez-moi	
2009	The Queen of Hearts	
2009	La Vie au ranch	
2009	Going South	
2010	Angel & Tony	
2010	Ich bin eine Terroristin	
2011	Iris in Bloom	
2012	Three Worlds	
2013	Stranger by the Lake	Nominated — César Award for Best Cinematography
2013	The Ugly One	
2014	The Last Hammer Blow	Nominated — Lumière Award for Best Cinematography
2015	Mon roi	Nominated — Lumière Award for Best Cinematography
2015	Two Friends	Nominated — Lumière Award for Best Cinematography
2015	The Sweet Escape	
2016	Staying Vertical	
2017	A Violent Life	
2018	Raoul Taburin	
2019	Atlantique	Los Angeles Film Critics Association Award for Best Cinematography; National Society of Film Critics Award for Best Cinematography
2019	Portrait of a Lady on Fire	Boston Society of Film Critics Award for Best Cinematography; César Award for Best Cinematography; Los Angeles Film Critics Association Award for Best Cinematography; National Society of Film Critics Award for Best Cinematography; New York Film Critics Circle Award for Best Cinematographer; Nominated — Chicago Film Critics Association Award for Best Cinematography; Nominated — Florida Film Critics Circle Award for Best Cinematography; Nominated — Georgia Film Critics Association Award for Best Cinematography; Nominated — Lumière Award for Best Cinematography; Nominated — Online Film Critics Society Award for Best Cinematography; Nominated — Phoenix Critics Circle Award for Best Cinematography; Nominated — Seattle Film Critics Society Award for Best Cinematography
2021	Petite Maman	
2021	Spencer	
2022	Saint Omer	Nominated — Lumière Award for Best Cinematography
2024	Misericordia	Nominated — Lumière Award for Best Cinematography; Nominated — César Award for Best Cinematography
2025	In the Land of Arto	

=== Short films ===
Year	Title	Notes
2000	Christmas Eve	
2001	Le Chemin de traverse	
2001	L'Impatience	
2002	La Fourmi amoureuse	
2002	Sans regrets	
2003	Leila	
2003	La Femme qui a vu l'ours	
2004	Ça fait mal à mon coeur	
2004	L'Étrangère	
2005	Moloch, les chairs vives	
2005	Saison	
2005	Le Petit chevalier	
2006	Cauchemar du perdeur de clés	
2006	Comment on freine dans une descente ?	
2007	Entracte	
2007	Tel père telle fille	
2008	Taxi wala	
2008	Les Hommes sans gravité	
2008	La Résidence Ylang Ylang	
2008	Baïnes	
2009	French Courvoisier	
2009	L'Échappée belle	
2011	La Piqûre	
2011	L'Imprésario	
2011	Exercice de fascination au milieu de la foule	Documentary short
2012	ABCDEFGHIJKLMNOP(Q)RSTUVWXYz	Documentary short
2014	T.W.E	
2014	Poisson	
2015	Standing Men	
2017	Médée	

=== Documentary films ===
Year	Title	Notes
2010	Le Chemin noir	
2010	Sheoeyin Kenna	
2012	On remuait les lèvres mais on ne disait rien	
2013	La Ligne de partage des eaux	
2015	The Foreign Son	
2016	Makhdoumin	
2017	Also Known as Jihadi	
2017	Lust for Sight	
2018	Nul homme n'est une île	

=== Television ===
Year	Title	Notes
2009	Lulô Kanda	TV short documentary
2009	Action = militantes	TV short documentary
2018	Ondes de choc	Miniseries
