= One of a Kind (film) =

2013 film

- Film poster
- Directed by: François Dupeyron
- Screenplay by: François Dupeyron
- Based on: Chacun pour soi, Dieu s'en fout by François Dupeyron
- Produced by: Paulo Branco
- Starring: Grégory Gadebois; Céline Sallette
- Cinematography: Yves Angelo
- Edited by: Dominique Faysse
- Music by: Armelle Mahé; François Maurel; Vanupié
- Distributed by: Alfama Films
- Release dates: 22 September 2013 (San Sebastián IFF); 25 September 2013 (France)
- Running time: 123 minutes
- Country: France
- Language: French
- Budget: $1.8 million
- Box office: $935,000

One of a Kind (French: Mon âme par toi guérie) is a 2013 French drama film directed by François Dupeyron. In January 2014 Grégory Gadebois received a nomination for Best Actor at the 39th César Awards.

== Plot ==
Frédi is a born healer who can save people by touching them with his hands. His mother bequeathed this gift to him. When she dies honours her by putting his aptitude to good use.

== Cast ==
- Grégory Gadebois as Frédi
- Céline Sallette as Nina
- Jean-Pierre Darroussin as The father
- Marie Payen as Josiane
- Philippe Rebbot as Nanar
- Nathalie Boutefeu as The leukemic mother
