= Anna Levanova =

Russian actress

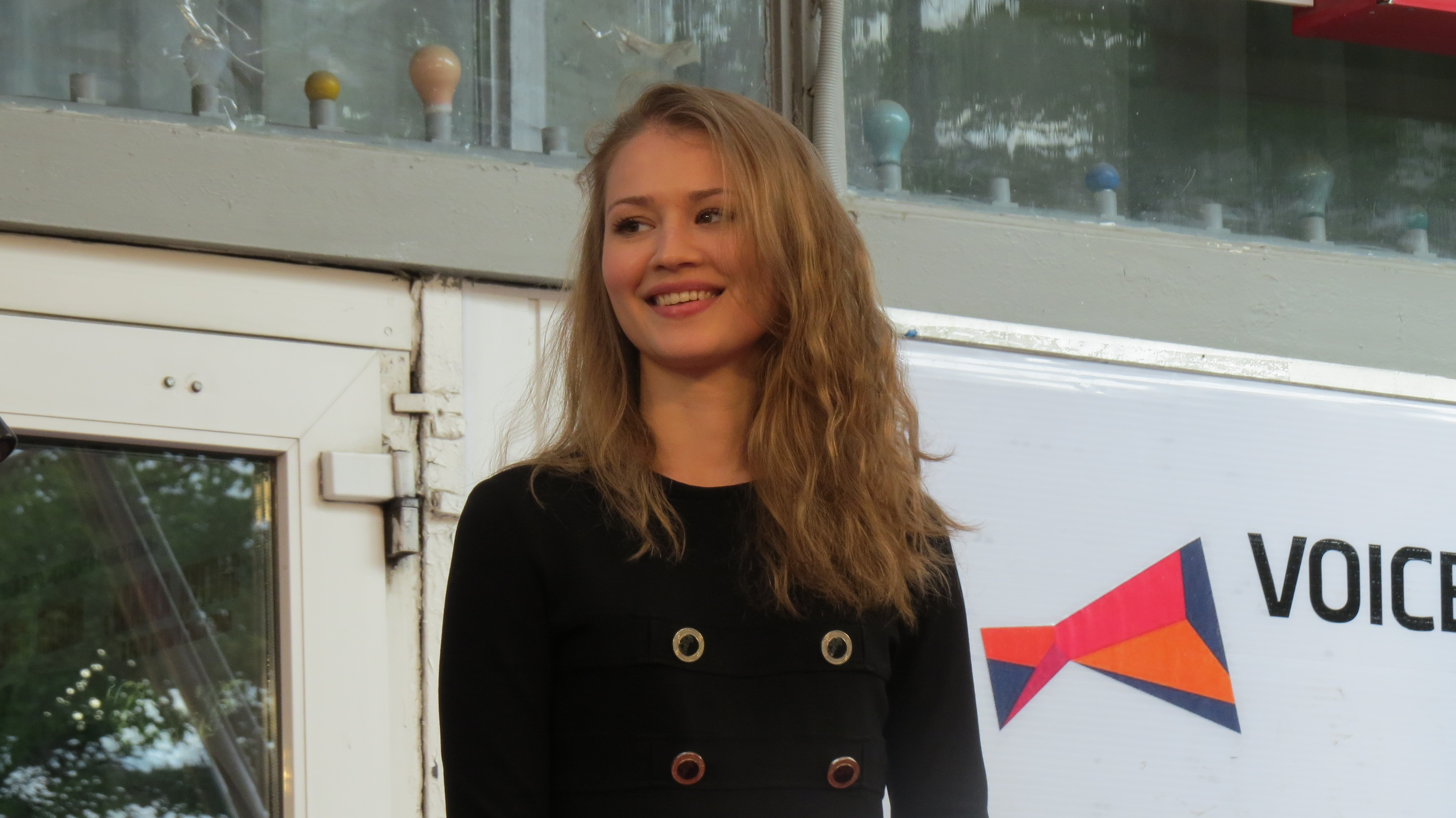
- Born: Anna Nikolayevna Bulatova; 19 December 1988 (age 37); Moscow, RSFSR, USSR
- Education: Theater of music and poetry E. Kamburova
- Occupation: Actress
- Years active: 2011–present

Anna Nikolayevna Levanova (Russian: Анна Николаевна Леванова; born 19 December 1988) is a Russian television and film actress, known for McMafia and Two Women. In 2014, she won the Yul Brynner Award of the Pacific Meridian International Film Festival of Asia Pacific Countries for her role in Two Women.

== Biography ==
Anna Levanova (née Bulatova) was born in Moscow, Russian SFSR, Soviet Union (now Russia). There were no professional actors or musicians in her family, yet home concerts and performances have always been a family tradition. According to Anna, she made her debut on the stage in a kindergarten - in the role of a fox in a matinee performance. From an early age she participated in school "skits" and went to the Children's Variety Theater. Her parents were supportive of her decision to become an actress.

But right after school she did not pass the competition for the theater high school. She submitted documents to the State Musical and Pedagogical Institute named after M. Ippolitov-Ivanov and successfully graduated from the class of folk vocals in 2010.

In the fourth year she made the fourth attempt to enter the theater, and got into the Mikhail Shchepkin Higher Theatre School in the studio of Vasily Bochkarev. She graduated from one institution and simultaneously studied in the first year of the other. She graduated from the Mikhail Shchepkin Higher Theatre School in 2013, workshop of V. Bochkarev.

In 2013-2016 she joined the troupe of the Moscow Theater "Sovremennik". Performed the role of Cinderella in the play "Cinderella" after the play by Evgeniy Schwartz, the daughter of the doctor in the "Decameron" Giovanni Boccaccio. In 2013, played in the Center V. Vysotsky, the role of Lizanka in the play "Zoyka apartment" by Mikhail Bulgakov.

== Career ==
Anna Levanova starred in the series Farewell of Slavianka (2011), Secrets of the Institute of Noble Maidens (2013), My long distance car (2013), Lermontov (2014) and others. She performed the main roles in the film-performance "Cinderella" in 2016, melodramas Wicked destiny (2016), For a better life (2016), Loneliness (2016), Choice (2017).

== Personal life ==
Levanova was married once.

== Filmography ==
=== Film ===
| Year | Title | Role | Notes |
|---|---|---|---|
| 2013 | Blizzard | Masha Vikhreva, the bride of Sergey | |
| 2014 | Two Women | Vera | |

=== Television ===
| Year | Title | Role | Notes |
|---|---|---|---|
| 2011 | Pretty boy | | episode |
| 2011 | Farewell of Slavianka | Anya | TV |
| 2013 | Secrets of the Institute of Noble Maidens | Alena Znamenskaya | |
| 2013 | My long distance car | Zoya | |
| 2013 | Once and for all | Masha Cherkasova | TV |
| 2014 | Undo all restrictions | Alisa | |
| 2014 | Lermontov | Varvara Lopukhina | TV (documentary) |
| 2014 | Love Blooms in Spring | Masha | |
| 2016 | Moscow. Central District 4 | | |
| 2016 | Wicked destiny | Anya Garina | TV |
| 2016 | For a better life | Dasha Tikhonova | mini-series |
| 2016 | Loneliness | Arina Zolotova | mini-series |
| 2017 | Vain hopes | Vera Semiplatov | mini-series |
| 2017 | Choice | Lyuda | TV |
| 2018 | McMafia | Natasha Kalyagina | |
