= Yves Angelo =

French cinematographer

- Born: 22 January 1956 (age 69); Morocco
- Occupation(s): Cinematographer, film director, screenwriter
- Years active: 1977–present

Yves Angelo (born 22 January 1956) is a French cinematographer, film director and screenwriter. Angelo has won the César Award for Best Cinematography three times: in 1990 for Nocturne indien, in 1992 for Tous les matins du monde, and in 1994 for Germinal.

== Filmography ==
Year	Title	Credited as			Notes
Year	Title	Director	Screenwriter	Cinematographer	Notes
1985	La Consultation			Yes	Short film
1989	Baxter			Yes	
1989	Nocturne Indien			Yes	César Award for Best Cinematography
1989	Chambre à part			Yes	
1990	Tumultes			Yes	
1991	Netchaïev est de retour			Yes	
1991	Un cœur qui bat			Yes	
1991	Tous les matins du monde			Yes	César Award for Best Cinematography
1992	A Heart in Winter			Yes	Nominated—César Award for Best Cinematography
1992	The Accompanist			Yes	Nominated—César Award for Best Cinematography
1993	Germinal			Yes	César Award for Best Cinematography
1994	Colonel Chabert	Yes	Yes		Cairo International Film Festival - Best Director; Nominated—César Award for Best First Feature Film
1997	An Air So Pure	Yes	Yes		
1997	Level Five			Yes	Documentary film (segment: "Laura among the animals")
1998	Stolen Life	Yes	Yes		Nominated—55th Venice International Film Festival - Golden Lion
2001	Don't Make Trouble!	Yes	Yes	Yes	Segment: "Poitiers, voiture 11"
2002	At My Finger Tips	Yes	Yes	Yes	
2003	Fear and Trembling			Yes	
2004	Malabar Princess			Yes	
2004	Inguélézi			Yes	
2005	Words in Blue			Yes	
2005	Grey Souls	Yes	Yes		
2007	The Second Wind			Yes	Nominated—César Award for Best Cinematography
2008	The Maiden and the Wolves			Yes	
2008	With a Little Help from Myself			Yes	
2010	An Ordinary Execution			Yes	
2010	Love Crime			Yes	
2011	The Kindness of Women	Yes		Yes	Telefilm
2011	You Will Be My Son			Yes	
2012	L'Oncle Charles			Yes	
2013	One of a Kind			Yes	
2014	Des fleurs pour algernon	Yes		Yes	Telefilm
2015	Au plus près du Soleil	Yes	Yes		
2015	L'Odeur de la mandarine			Yes	
2016	Open at Night			Yes	
2016	Primaire			Yes	
2017	Some Like It Veiled			Yes	
2017	Reinventing Marvin			Yes	
2018	Le collier rouge			Yes	
2018	Place publique			Yes	
2018	Deux fils			Yes	
2019	Blanche comme neige			Yes	
2019	Les éblouis			Yes	
2020	Police			Yes	
2021	Presidents			Yes	
2022	Maigret			Yes	
2022	Les volets verts			Yes	
