= Kaan Müjdeci =

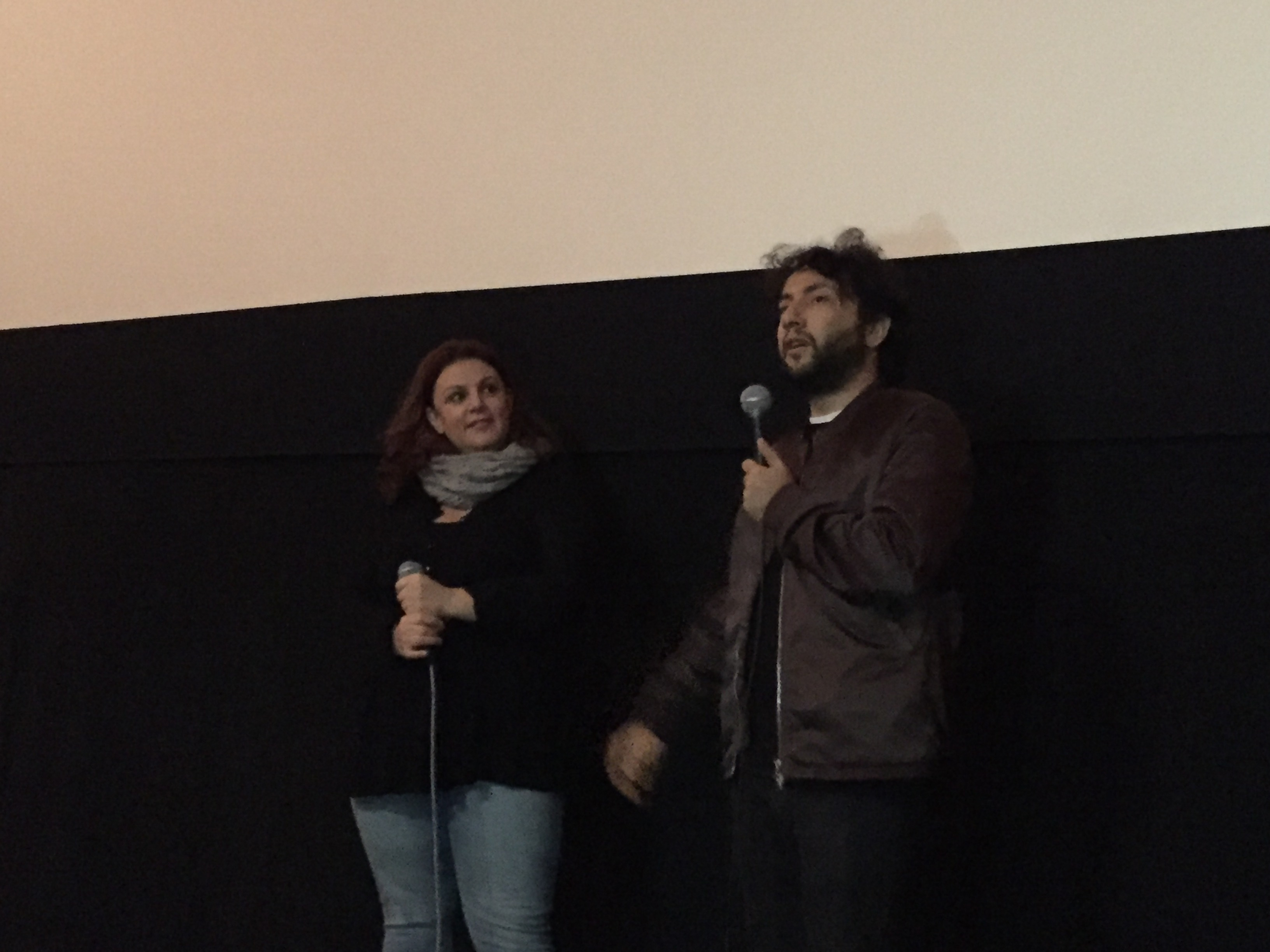
Kaan Müjdeci (right) during the question/answer session following the screening of his film, Sivas, at the Seattle Turkish Film Festival.

Kaan Müjdeci (born 24 September 1980) is a screenwriter and film director. He is the winner of Special Jury Prize at the 71st Venice International Film Festival with his debut feature Sivas in 2014.

== Career ==
Kaan Müjdeci was born on September 24, 1980, in Turkey and he currently divides his time between Istanbul and Berlin. His feature debut SIVAS premiered at the 71st Venice Film Festival in the main competition and was awarded the Special Jury Prize. In 2015, SIVAS was the official nominee from Turkey for the Best Foreign Language Film Oscar at the 88th Academy Awards. His first exhibition IGUANA TOKYO PROLOGUE opened in Tokyo Art and Space in 2017. His second feature film IGUANA TOKYO was selected to Cannes Cinefondation L'Atelier at the 69th Cannes Film Festival and later to Venice Gap-Financing Market at the 76th Venice International Film Festival. In 2021, Müjdeci wrote and directed a seven-part series, based on Shakespeare’s HAMLET. It had its world premiere at Series Mania in Lille, France.

== Films ==
Tag der Deutschen Einheit (Day of German Unity) - Müjdeci’s first short film, shot in 2010 in Berlin.

Jerry - Short Film. Müjdeci shot Jerry in New York in 2011. Jerry was screened within the scope of Berlinale Talent Campus of 61st Berlin International Film Festival in 2011.

Babalar ve Oğulları (Fathers and Sons) – Short Documentary. Müjdeci’s documentary Babalar ve Oğulları (Fathers and Sons), about dog fights in central Anatolia, served as a platform to write and direct his first feature film entitled SIVAS. Babalar ve Oğulları (Fathers and Sons) was shown in Kraków Film Festival in 2012.

SIVAS – Feature debut. Shot in 2012 in Yozgat, Yerköy SIVAS was premiered in 71st Venice Film Festival, SIVAS received the Grand Jury Prize.

Iguana Tokyo - Kaan Müjdeci’s second feature Iguana Tokyo is currently in post-production. The project was presented among others in Cannes L'Atelier of Cannes Film Festival, Meetings on the Bridge of 34th Istanbul Film Festival and Cinelink 2015 of Sarajevo Film Festival.
