= Sidi Saleh =

Indonesian film director (born 1979)

- Born: April 5, 1979 (age 47); Jakarta, Indonesia
- Occupations: Cinematographer, Film Director,
- Years active: 2000 - present

Sidi Saleh (born 1979) is an Indonesian cinematographer and film director. He is known for his work on several acclaimed short films and features like including Maryam, Fitri, Taksu, Blind Pig Who Wants to Fly and Postcard From The Zoo.

== Education ==
Sidi Saleh graduated from the Jakarta Institute of Arts.

== Career ==
Sidi began his career as a cinematographer, frequently collaborating with director Edwin. He worked on several of Edwin's short and feature films, including Kara, Anak Sebatang Pohon (2005), which won the Best Short Film award at the Indonesian Film Festival and became the first Indonesian film to be selected for the Directors' Fortnight at the Cannes Film Festival Kara Director's Fortnight (French: Quinzaine des Réalisateurs) selection at the Cannes Film Festival in 2005.., Anak Sebatang Pohon won the Best Short Film award at the 2005 Indonesian Film Festival. Their collaboration continued with Blind Pig Who Wants to Fly (2009), which received the FIPRESCI Award at the International Film Festival Rotterdam Blind Pig Who Wants to Fly won the FIPRESCI Award at the 2009 International Film Festival Rotterdam, and Postcard from the Zoo (2012), which was included in the main competition at the Berlinale Film Festival Postcard From The Zoo Berlinale Film Festival.

As a director, Sidi has helmed several short films and Features. His works include Full Moon, a segment of the anthology film Belkibolang (2010), and Fitri, which was screened at the Clermont-Ferrand International Short Film Festival. In 2014, Saleh's short film Maryam was awarded the Orizzonti Award by the international jury chaired by Ann Hui and comprising Moran Atias, Pernilla August, David Chase, Mahamat-Saleh Haroun, Roberto Minervini and Alin Taşçiyan at the 71st Venice Film Festival. This win made him the first Indonesian filmmaker to receive a trophy from the Venice Film Festival.

== Awards and honors ==
Year	Awards	Category	Works	Result
2007	Festival Film Indonesia	Best Cinematography	Merah Itu Cinta	Nominated
2010	Jogja-NETPAC Asian Film Festival (JAFF)	Golden Hanoman Award	Belkibolang (Shared with Agung Sentausa, Ifa Isfansyah, Tumpal Tampubolon, Rico Marpaung, Anggun Priambodo, Azhar Lubis, Wisnu Surya Pratama, and Edwin)	Nominated
2012	Jogja-NETPAC Asian Film Festival (JAFF)	Blencong Award	Love Me Please	Nominated
2014	Venice International Film Festival	Venice Horizons Award	Maryam	Won
2014	Tallinn Black Nights Film Festival	Sleepwalkers Jury Prize	Maryam	Nominated
2014	Festival Film Indonesia	Best Short Film	Maryam	Nominated
2014	Jogja-NETPAC Asian Film Festival (JAFF)	Blencong Award	Maryam	Nominated
