= Sivas (film) =

2014 film

- Film poster
- Directed by: Kaan Müjdeci
- Written by: Kaan Müjdeci
- Produced by: Yasin Müjdeci
- Starring: Doğan İzci
- Cinematography: Martin Solvang; Armin Dierolf
- Edited by: Yorgos Mavropsardis
- Release dates: 3 September 2014 (Venice); 31 October 2014 (Turkey)
- Running time: 97 minutes
- Countries: Turkey; Germany
- Language: Turkish

Sivas is a 2014 Turkish drama film directed by Kaan Müjdeci. It was selected to compete for the Golden Lion at the 71st Venice International Film Festival where it won the Special Jury Prize. The film was selected as the Turkish entry for the Best Foreign Language Film at the 88th Academy Awards but it was not nominated.

== Plot ==
The film follows an eleven-year-old boy named Aslan (Dogan Izci) and his relationship to a fighting dog, Sivas. The initial scenes show Aslan's life at school and home. Many of the interactions with his classmates and family members display conflict.

The teacher (Okan Avci) announces at school that there's to be a performance of Snow White and the Seven Dwarves put on by the students. Ayse (Ezgi Ergin), a girl Aslan likes, is selected to be the princess and Aslan's friend Osman (Furkan Uyar) is selected to be the prince. However, Aslan wants the role, mainly to impress Ayse. Later, Aslan tries to convince his teacher to make him the prince. His teacher does not.

Echoing the later encounter with Sivas, Aslan is charged with putting his family's old horse out to pasture. He tries to shoo away the horse with stones. One of them leads to the horse falling down, as if dead. Thinking he's killed the animal, Aslan goes to get his brother, Sahin. When they return, the horse is nowhere to be found.

Many of the men in the village gather by a secluded stream (to avoid police attention) for a dog fight. Sivas fights another dog, is wounded, and left for dead. Aslan stays back when he notices the dog isn't dead and begs his brother to let him take the dog home. When refused, Aslan stays back when Sahin leaves before night falls. He tries to befriend the dog, trying to move close to him and warm him with his coat. Sahin finally returns in search of Aslan and takes both home.

Aslan cares for Sivas as he recovers. He shows off his dog to his friends and attempts to impress Ayse. Goaded by the owner of the dog that had bested Sivas, Aslan lets him fight the other dog again. Sivas emerges victorious.

One day, Aslan arrives home to find Sivas tied up. Discovering his family wants to sell the dog, he throws a tantrum. The original owners of Sivas come to make him fight again. They all travel in a car to a large meetup of dog fighters, where Sivas once again wins.

On the way back home, Aslan declares Sivas won't fight again. He is told Sivas was meant to be a fighter, so he must.

== Cast ==
- Doğan İzci as Aslan
- Çakır as Sivas
- Hasan Özdemir as Hasan
- Ezgi Ergin as Ayşe
- Furkan Uyar as Osman
- Ozan Çelik as Şahin
- Banu Fotocan as mother
- Hasan Yazılıtılaş as father
- Okan Avcı as teacher

== Production ==
While the film features several dog fights, none were harmed during their production. A combination of audio clips collected from real dog fights, shaky camera movement, tranquilizing the dogs harmless, and fake blood were used to film them. The crew applied lotion to the dog's teeth to prevent real bites, and dosed them with alcohol-infused liquid to slow them down, preventing them from hurting one another. Moreover, the fight scenes were carefully choreographed, and make-up was layered in to create the illusion of continuity. The production company coined the idea to actually have a lot of backup dogs—up to 15, but I treated these dogs as characters with their own personalities, so I wanted to go with only one single dog on this film. When it came time to make Sivas, Müjdeci scouted close to 1,000 kids from the region, ultimately selecting his two leads just three days before filming began.

== Reception ==
Sivas was widely acclaimed by critics with a particular praise for the performance of the main actor and realistic style of the director. Sivas has an approval rating of 80% on review aggregator website Rotten Tomatoes, based on 5 reviews, and an average rating of 5.1/10. The non-judgmental stance on the world of underground dog-fighting prompted some boos at Venice 2014 but the film has already won a Jury Prize and a Best Actor Prize in the Venice Film Festival, a Best Actor and Child Protection Award in ADFF, among many others around the world. Critic Nina Rothe said, "Sivas should be watched because of the same, favorite leitmotif of mine, a reason I watch and write about films. It deals with "the Other" this figure of an individual—or a whole people as we are so fond of doing these days, group everyone together—whom we think is so very different from us, we'll never be able to meet in the middle. Instead Sivas shows this alien, this foreigner, the person we are so incredibly afraid of as a boy who plays the same games we played as children, likes hide and seek and shooting firecrackers with friends, is starting to notice girls and yearns for the company of a dog."

== Influences ==
Nina Rothe from The Huffington Post has discerned possible influences on Sivas from Orhan Pamuk's novel Snow. "I mentioned Pamuk's Snow earlier, because it is through it that I could relate more organically to Sivas. I needed an extra layer of knowledge to get, truly get the human harshness that a landscape so arduous, so politically charged and yet so poor creates within a little boy. Pamuk makes it clear, gets to the heart of this concept in a passage from his book: "In a brutal country like ours, where human life is 'cheap', it's stupid to destroy yourself for the sake of your beliefs. Beliefs? High ideas? Only people in rich countries can enjoy such luxuries."

== See also ==
- List of submissions to the 88th Academy Awards for Best Foreign Language Film
- List of Turkish submissions for the Academy Award for Best Foreign Language Film
