= Gruchet-le-Valasse =

- Commune
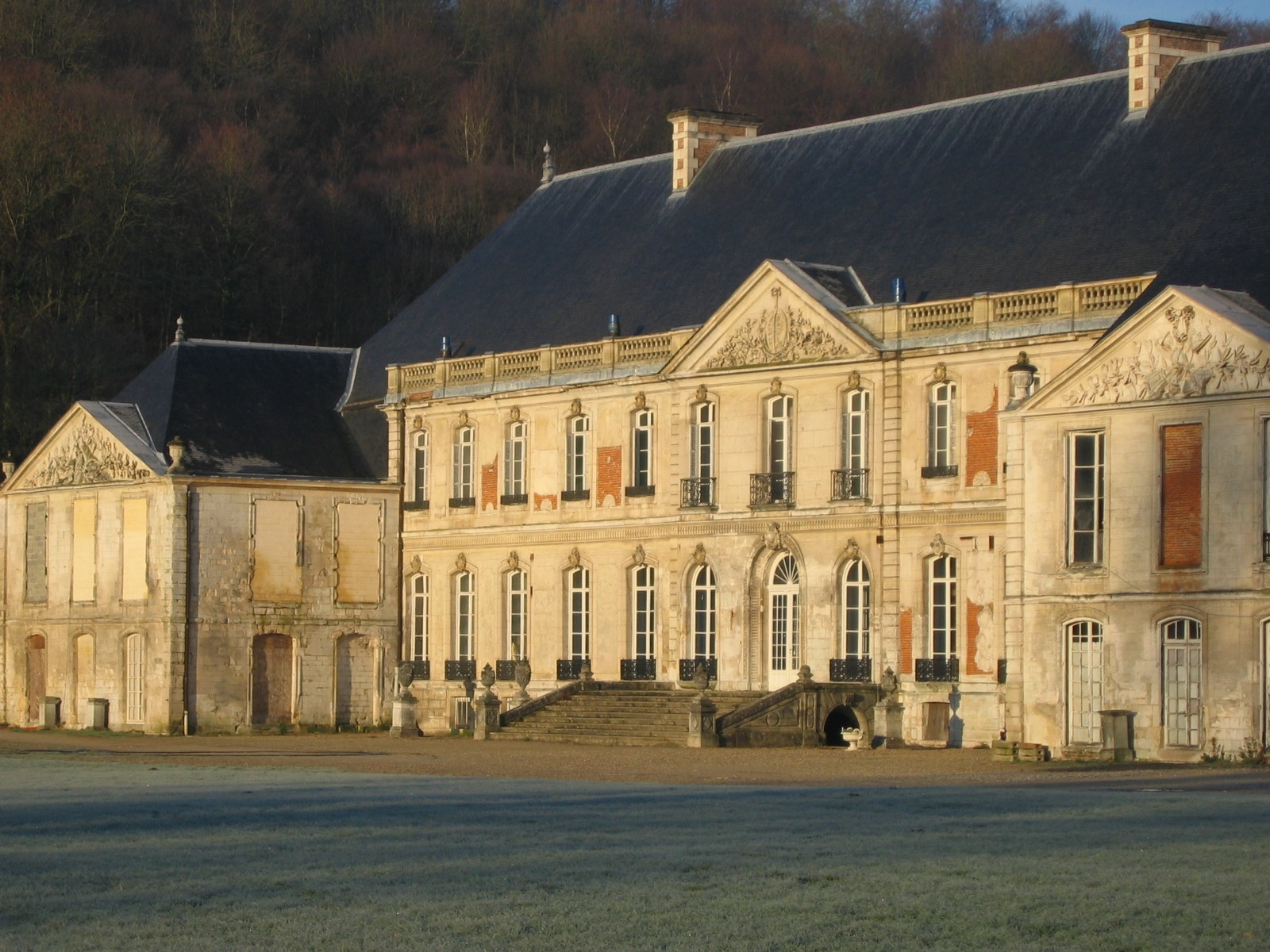
- The abbey of Valasse, in 2004

- Coat of arms
- Location of Gruchet-le-Valasse
- Location within France Location within Normandy
- Coordinates: 49°33′25″N 0°29′08″E
- Country: France
- Region: Normandy
- Department: Seine-Maritime
- Arrondissement: Le Havre
- Canton: Bolbec
- Intercommunality: Caux Seine Agglo

Government
  - Mayor (2020–2026): Didier Peralta (UDI)
- Area^{1}: 14.2 km^{2} (5.5 sq mi)
- Elevation: 30 m (98 ft)
- Highest elevation: 141 m (463 ft)
- Lowest elevation: 12 m (39 ft)
- Population (2023): 3,008
  - Density: 212/km^{2} (549/sq mi)
- Time zone: UTC+01:00 (CET)
  - Summer (DST): UTC+02:00 (CEST)
- INSEE/Postal code: 76329 /76210
- ^{1} French Land Register data, which excludes lakes, ponds, glaciers > 1 km^{2} (0.386 sq mi or 247 acres) and river estuaries.

Gruchet-le-Valasse (French pronunciation: [ɡʁyʃɛ lə valas]) is a commune in the Seine-Maritime department of the Normandy region in northern France.

== Geography ==
A village of forestry, farming and associated light industry situated in the Pays de Caux, some 15 miles (24 km) east of Le Havre, at the junction of the D173 and D9015 roads.

== Heraldry ==
Arms of Gruchet-le-Valasse	The arms of Gruchet-le-Valasse are blazoned : Gules, 3 leopards Or dimidiated with Or, a double-headed eagle crowned azure.

== Population ==
Historical population
Year	Pop.	±% p.a.
1968	1,855	—
1975	1,819	−0.28%
1982	2,317	+3.52%
1990	2,787	+2.34%
1999	2,682	−0.43%
2007	2,544	−0.66%
2012	3,077	+3.88%
2017	3,160	+0.53%
2023	3,008	−0.82%
Source: INSEE

== Places of interest ==
- Several 16th-century houses.
- The church of St Thomas, dating from the 14th century.
- The 12th-century Valasse Abbey (after which the Valasse Cross is named).
- The 19th-century Hôtel de Ville (town hall).

== See also ==
- Communes of the Seine-Maritime department
