= François Dupeyron =

French film director and screenwriter

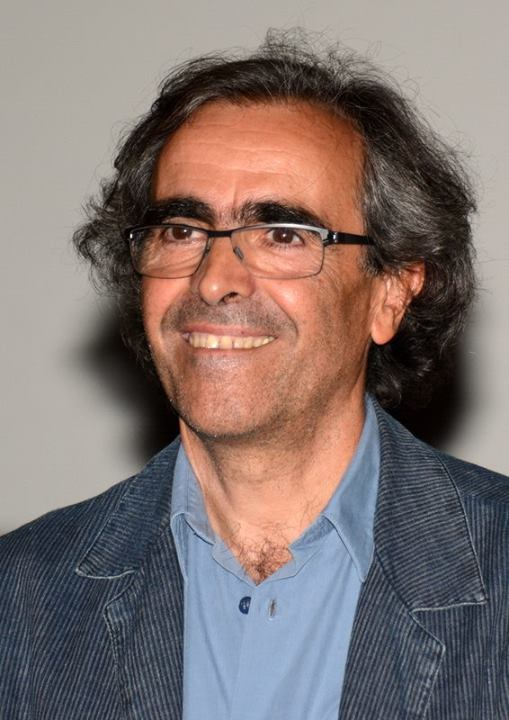
- Dupeyron in 2013
- Born: 14 August 1950; Tartas, Landes, France
- Died: 25 February 2016 (aged 65)
- Occupations: Film director Screenwriter
- Years active: 1977–2016

François Dupeyron (14 August 1950 – 25 February 2016) was a French film director and screenwriter. He directed 17 films between 1977 and 2015. His film La Chambre des officiers was entered into the 2001 Cannes Film Festival.

== Filmography ==
Short film

Year	Title	Director	Writer
1978	L'Ornière	Yes	Yes
1980	Expédition Pount	Yes	
1982	La Dragonne	Yes	Yes
1982	On est toujours trop bonne	Yes	Yes
1988	Lamento	Yes	Yes

Documentary short

Year	Title	Director	Writer	DoP	Editor
1977	La Télédétection: Un nouveau regard sur la terre	Yes			
1983	Les Récoltés du désert	Yes	Yes		
1984	Cochon de guerre	Yes	Yes	Yes	Yes
1984	La Nuit du hibou	Yes	Yes	Yes	Yes
1985	Oasis sous la mer	Yes	Yes		

Feature film

Year	Title	Director	Writer	Notes
1988	A Strange Place to Meet	Yes	Yes	
1991	Un cœur qui bat	Yes	Yes	
1994	The Machine	Yes	Yes	
1994	The Favourite Son		Yes	
1996	L'@mour est à réinventer	Yes	Yes	Segment: "Et alors ?"
1999	The Bridge		Yes	
1999	C'est quoi la vie?	Yes	Yes	
2001	Don't Make Trouble!	Yes	Yes	Segment: "Poitiers, voiture 11"
2001	The Officers' Ward	Yes	Yes	
2003	Monsieur Ibrahim	Yes	Yes	
2004	Inguélézi	Yes	Yes	
2008	With a Little Help from Myself	Yes	Yes	
2009	Trésor	Yes		Co-director
2013	One of a Kind	Yes	Yes	
2015	Au plus près du Soleil		Yes	

== Awards and nominations ==
Year	Title	Award/Nomination
1982	La Dragonne	Clermont-Ferrand International Short Film Festival - Grand Prix
1984	La Nuit du hibou	César Award for Best Short Film - Documentary
1988	Lamento	César Award for Best Short Film - Fiction; Clermont-Ferrand International Short Film Festival - Grand Prix; Clermont-Ferrand International Short Film Festival - Youth Jury Award
1988	A Strange Place to Meet	Nominated—César Award for Best First Feature Film; Nominated—César Award for Best Original Screenplay or Adaptation
1999	C'est quoi la vie?	San Sebastián International Film Festival - Golden Shell; San Sebastián International Film Festival - OCIC Award
2001	The Officers' Ward	Nominated—Cannes Film Festival - Palme d'Or; Nominated—César Award for Best Film; Nominated—César Award for Best Director; Nominated—César Award for Best Original Screenplay or Adaptation
2003	Monsieur Ibrahim	Nominated—Golden Globe Award for Best Foreign Language Film; Nominated—Goya Award for Best European Film
2004	Inguélézi	Nominated—San Sebastián International Film Festival - Golden Shell
2008	With a Little Help from Myself	Lumière Award for Best Director; Rome Film Festival - Special Mention; Tokyo International Film Festival - Best Artistic Contribution Award; Nominated—Lumière Award for Best Film
2013	One of a Kind	Nominated—Louis Delluc Prize for Best Film; Nominated—San Sebastián International Film Festival - Golden Shell
