= Jerry Gracio =

Filipino poet and political activist (born 1969)

- Born: Jerry Arcega Gracio; July 6, 1969 (age 56); Tondo, Manila, Philippines
- Occupations: Poet, screenwriter, author, activist
- Known for: Philippine literature and cinema
- Other political affiliations: Kapamilya ng Manggagawang Pilipino (2022)
- Awards: Carlos Palanca Memorial Award; S.E.A. Write Award; FAMAS Best Screenplay (2018); Makata ng Taon (2017)

Jerry B. Gracio (born July 6, 1969), also credited in his early career as Jerry Arcega-Gracio, is a Filipino poet, screenwriter, author, politician, and political activist. Recognized for his substantial contributions to contemporary Philippine literature and cinema, he is a recipient of the Carlos Palanca Memorial Award for Literature, the S.E.A. Write Award, and a FAMAS Award for Best Screenplay. He previously served as the Commissioner for the Samar-Leyte languages at the Komisyon sa Wikang Filipino (KWF) until his resignation in 2020.

== Literary and film career ==
Gracio is known for his extensive body of literary work spanning poetry and creative non-fiction. Under the name Jerry Arcega-Gracio, he won Palanca Awards in 2002 for his Filipino short story Isda and his poetry collection Sinaunang Pag-ibig sa Apoy. In 2017, the Komisyon sa Wikang Filipino honored him with the title "Makata ng Taon" (Poet of the Year).

As a screenwriter, Gracio has written for mainstream television and independent cinema. He frequently collaborated with the broadcast network ABS-CBN as a resident writer, contributing to television dramas such as The Greatest Love. In 2011, two of his written screenplays—Isda (directed by Adolfo Alix Jr.) and Ligo Na U, Lapit Na Me—were highly acclaimed entries at the Cinemalaya Philippine Independent Film Festival. His other notable screenplay credits include Santa Santita (2004), Imoral (2008), and the 2010 musical film Emir. He won the FAMAS Award for Best Screenplay in 2018.

== Government service and activism ==
Gracio was appointed as the KWF Commissioner for Samar-Leyte languages under the administration of President Rodrigo Duterte. However, following the controversial government-backed shutdown of the ABS-CBN broadcasting network, Gracio submitted his resignation in July 2020. Taking to social media, he declared that he could no longer "serve a fascist government," a statement that drew a public response from Presidential Spokesperson Harry Roque.

In August 2022, when the KWF issued a memorandum banning five "subversive" books from schools and libraries, Gracio publicly accused the KWF board of "red-tagging" their fellow academics, warning that such censorship signaled the "death of scholarship" in the country. He later ran as a party-list representative for the Kapamilya ng Manggagawang Pilipino in the 2022 elections.

== 2028 Valenzuela mayoral campaign ==
On March 20, 2026, Gracio announced his candidacy for Mayor of Valenzuela, challenging incumbent mayor Wes Gatchalian who is the brother of Senator Win Gatchalian. He framed his candidacy as a "citizen's revolt" and positioned himself as "anti-trapo" (traditional politician).

== Selected works ==
=== Bibliography ===
Gracio has authored and edited several acclaimed collections of poetry and creative non-fiction:

- Apokripos (2006)
- Aves (2009)
- Minsan Lang Sila Normal (as editor, 2012)
- Waray Hiunong Sa Gugma | Walang Tungkol sa Pag-ibig (2017)
- Hindi Bagay (2018)
- Bagay Tayo (2018)

=== Filmography ===
Selected film screenplays

- Itlog (2002)
- Santa Santita (2004)
- Imoral (2008)
- Engkwentro (2009)
- Emir (2010)
- Muli (2010)
- Isda (Fable of the Fish) (2011)
- Ligo na Ü, Lapit na Me (2011)
- Corazon: Ang Unang Aswang (2012)
- Mater Dolorosa (2012)
- Aparisyon (2012)
- Intoy Shokoy ng Kalye Marino (2012)
- Echorsis (2016)
- Balangiga: Howling Wilderness (2017)
- The Significant Other (2018)

Selected Television Writing

- The Greatest Love (2016–2017)
- A Soldier's Heart (2020)
