= Flapping in the Middle of Nowhere =

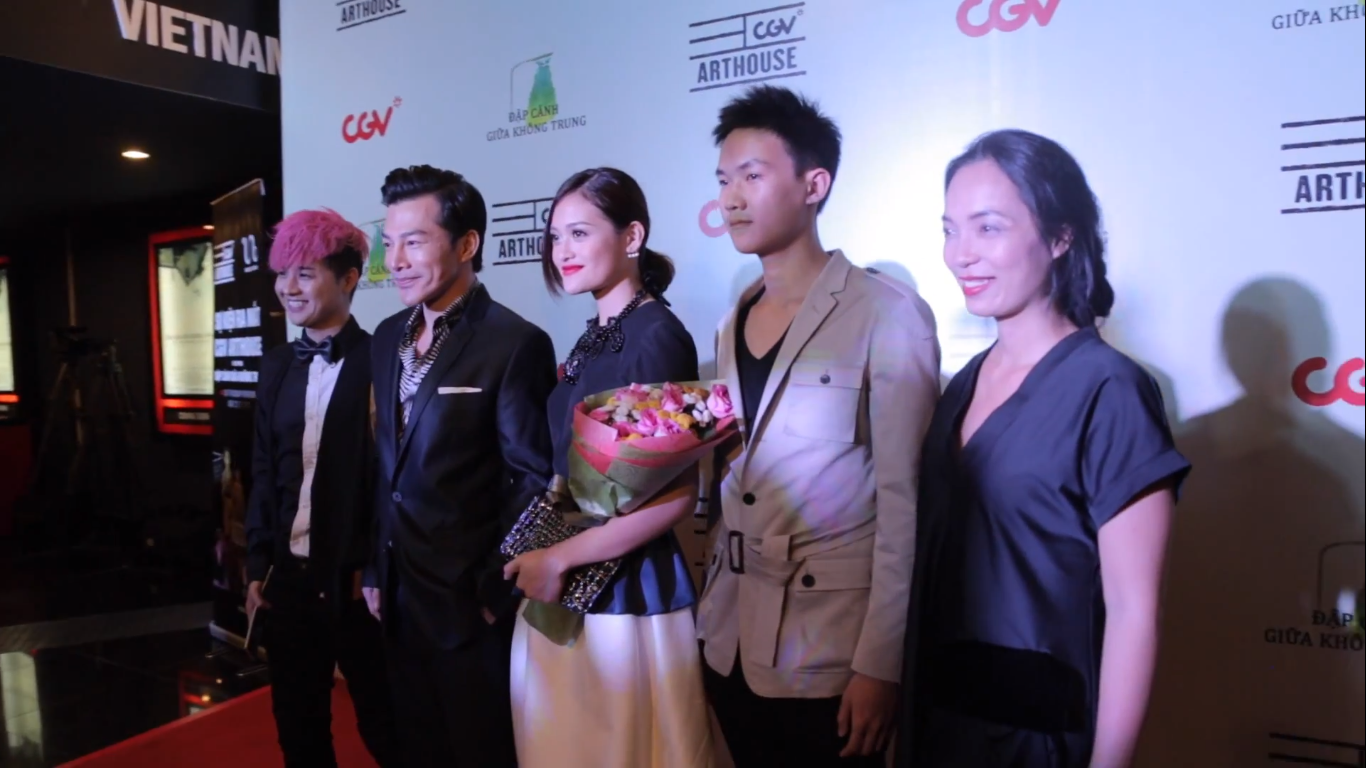
- Đập cánh giữa không trung
- Directed by: Nguyễn Hoàng Điệp
- Written by: Nguyễn Hoàng Điệp
- Produced by: Nguyễn Hoàng Điệp; Thierry Lenouvel\Alan R. Milligan; David Lindner
- Starring: Trần Bảo Sơn; Nguyễn Thùy Anh; Thanh Duy; Hoàng Hà
- Edited by: Jacques Comets; Gustavo Vasco
- Music by: Pierre Aviat
- Release date: September 2, 2014
- Running time: 99 minutes
- Country: Vietnam
- Language: Vietnamese

Flapping in the Middle of Nowhere is a 2014 internationally co-produced drama film written and directed by Nguyễn Hoàng Điệp.

== Plot ==
Huyền is a college student. Her boyfriend, Tùng, works for the city and enjoys illegal cockfighting. They live together in the capital, far away from their families. Tùng always wants to make love with Huyền, which results in Huyền's discovery of pregnancy. The couple, which never has enough money to make ends meet, decides to abort.

== Reception ==
Flapping in the Middle of Nowhere has received mostly favourable reviews from critics. Guy Lodge from Variety wrote "Vietnamese helmer Diep Hoang Nguyen's sly, sensual, politically probing debut is a knocked-up drama with a difference".

== Accolades ==
Venice International Film Festival

- FEDEORA Best Film - won

Ha Noi International Film Festival

- Jury Special Award for Length Film - won

Fribourg International Film Festival

- The Youth Jury and the Exchange Award - won
- Special Mention of International Jury - won
- The Ecumenical Jury Award - won

Three Continents Festival

- Jury Prize - won

International Film Festival Bratislava

- Best Director - won

AFI FEST

- New Auteurs - nominated

Toronto International Film Festival

- Grolsch People’s Choice Award - nominated
