= Éric Gautier =

French cinematographer (born 1961)

- Born: 2 April 1961 (age 65); Paris, France
- Occupation: Cinematographer
- Years active: 1982–present

Éric Gautier (born 2 April 1961) is a French cinematographer. He has received numerous accolades for his work, including a César Award for Those Who Love Me Can Take the Train and an Independent Spirit Award for The Motorcycle Diaries.

== Early life ==
Gautier was born and raised in Paris. He grew up in its eleventh, twelfth, nineteenth and twentieth arrondissements with his construction engineer father, mother, and younger sister. During his youth he excelled in music, and from the age of eleven played the piano and organ. He originally aspired to become a professional musician before becoming disillusioned with the field and deciding to pursue a career in cinema instead, which he felt combined many different creative pursuits. He attended the film school of the Louis Lumière College.

== Career ==
After graduating from the Louis Lumière film school in 1982, Gautier began work as an assistant camera operator director on Alain Resnais's film Life Is a Bed of Roses. He left the job soon after, however, and chose instead to work as the director of photography on short films. He shot 60 films before returning to feature film work. The first feature-length film he photographed was La Vie des morts, released in 1991 and directed by Arnaud Desplechin. He won a César Award for his cinematography on Those Who Love Me Can Take the Train (1998), and received nominations for his work on Sentimental Destinies (2000), Clean (2004), Gabrielle (2005), Private Fears in Public Places (2006), and A Christmas Tale (2008). He has worked on many other French films, collaborating most often with Resnais and the directors Olivier Assayas, Arnaud Desplechin, and Claude Berri.

Gautier began working in the international film in the early 2000s, beginning with The Motorcycle Diaries, for which he won the Independent Spirit Award for Best Cinematography and the 2004 Cannes Film Festival Technical Grand Prize, and was nominated for the BAFTA Award for Best Cinematography. After seeing The Motorcycle Diaries, American actor/filmmaker Sean Penn approached Gautier to shoot the 2007 film Into the Wild, for which he won a Lumière Award. He subsequently served as director of photography on the American films Taking Woodstock (2009) and Grace of Monaco (2014).

== Filmography ==
=== Film ===
Year	Title	Director	Note
1991	La Vie des morts	Arnaud Desplechin	
1994	The Favourite Son	Nicole Garcia	
1995	One Hundred and One Nights	Agnès Varda	
1996	Irma Vep	Olivier Assayas	
1996	Tykho Moon	Enki Bilal	
1998	Those Who Love Me Can Take the Train	Patrice Chéreau	César Award for Best Cinematography
1999	Pola X	Leos Carax	
2000	Esther Kahn	Arnaud Desplechin	
2001	Intimacy	Patrice Chéreau	
2001	Brief Crossing	Catherine Breillat	
2001	Savage Souls	Raúl Ruiz	
2003	His Brother	Patrice Chéreau	
2004	The Motorcycle Diaries	Walter Salles	Independent Spirit Award for Best Cinematography
2004	Clean	Olivier Assayas	
2004	Kings and Queen	Arnaud Desplechin	
2006	Paris, Je T’Aime	Walter Salles and Daniela Thomas; Olivier Assayas	Segments, "Loin du 16ème", "Quartier des Enfants Rouges"
2006	Noise	Olivier Assayas	Documentary
2006	A Guide to Recognizing Your Saints	Dito Montiel	
2006	Quelques veuves de Noirmoutier	Agnès Varda	Documentary
2006	Private Fears in Public Places	Alain Resnais	
2007	Into the Wild	Sean Penn	
2008	Summer Hours	Olivier Assayas	
2008	A Christmas Tale	Arnaud Desplechin	
2009	Wild Grass	Alain Resnais	
2009	Taking Woodstock	Ang Lee	
2010	Miral	Julian Schnabel	
2012	On the Road	Walter Salles	
2012	You Ain’t Seen Nothin’ Yet	Alain Resnais	
2012	Something in the Air	Olivier Assayas	
2014	Grace of Monaco	Olivier Dahan	
2015	Hitchcock/Truffaut	Kent Jones	Co-cinematographer with five others
2015	Aloha	Cameron Crowe	
2015	Rabin, the Last Day	Amos Gitai	Docudrama
2017	The Elephant and the Butterfly	Amélie van Elmbt	
2017	The Mercy	James Marsh	
2018	The Apparition	Xavier Giannoli	
2018	Ash is Purest White	Jia Zhangke	
2018	A Tramway in Jerusalem	Amos Gitai	
2019	The Truth	Hirokazu Koreeda	
2022	Both Sides of the Blade	Claire Denis	
2022	Stars at Noon	Claire Denis	

=== Short films ===
Year	Title	Director	Note
1997	Sans Titre	Leos Carax	
2014	Incident Urbain	John Lalor	

=== Television ===
Year	Title	Director	Note
1994	Personne ne m'aime	Marion Vernoux	Television film
1994	Travolta and Me	Patricia Mazuy	Television film Part of the "All the Boys and Girls of Their Age" anthology

== Personal life ==
Gautier was married until 1995, when his wife Valentine died from cancer at the age of 32. His current partner is Nathalie Boutefeu, an actress with whom he has two daughters, Suzanne and Angela.
