= Assayas =

Assayas is a Jewish surname. Notable people with the surname include:

- Michka Assayas (born 1958), French author, music journalist, and radio presenter
- Olivier Assayas (born 1955), French film director
- Jacques Rémy (writer) (1910–1981), father of Olivier and Michka
