= Delicacy (film) =

2011 film by David Foenkinos and Stéphane Foenkinos

- Theatrical release poster
- French: La Délicatesse
- Directed by: David Foenkinos; Stéphane Foenkinos
- Screenplay by: David Foenkinos
- Based on: La Délicatesse by David Foenkinos
- Produced by: Xavier Rigault; Marc-Antoine Robert
- Starring: Audrey Tautou; François Damiens; Bruno Todeschini; Mélanie Bernier; Joséphine de Meaux; Pio Marmaï; Monique Chaumette; Ariane Ascaride; Christophe Malavoy; Alexandre Pavloff; Marc Citti
- Cinematography: Rémy Chevrin
- Edited by: Virginie Bruant
- Music by: Émilie Simon
- Production companies: 2.4.7. Films; StudioCanal; France 2 Cinéma
- Distributed by: StudioCanal
- Release date: 8 November 2011
- Running time: 108 minutes
- Country: France
- Language: French
- Budget: €7 million
- Box office: $11.6 million

Delicacy (French: La Délicatesse) is a 2011 French romantic comedy-drama film directed by David and Stéphane Foenkinos in their feature directorial debut, based on the 2009 novel of the same name by David Foenkinos. Starring Audrey Tautou and François Damiens, the film follows a young Parisian woman who finds herself suddenly widowed and is subsequently courted by a Swedish co-worker.

== Plot ==
Nathalie Kerr and François are a young couple in Paris who get married and lead a happy life together. Nathalie takes a new job at the Paris office of a Swedish firm where her married boss, Charles Delamain, becomes attracted to her. One day, François is killed in a traffic accident while out jogging. Nathalie is devastated and becomes withdrawn from her parents and friends. She eventually returns to work, and for the next three years, she dedicates herself completely to her job in order to cope with her grief. To celebrate Nathalie's promotion, Charles takes her to dinner, but she rejects his advances.

One day, Markus Lundell, a member of Nathalie's work group, enters her office to discuss a case. In a trance-like state, she walks up to him and impulsively kisses him, much to his astonishment. A balding, slightly overweight and socially awkward Swede who often wears beige sweaters, Markus becomes instantly infatuated with Nathalie. The next morning, Markus goes to Nathalie's office and brings up the kiss, but she apologizes for her behavior and insists that they keep their relationship strictly professional. Disappointed, he leaves her office.

The next day, Markus enters Nathalie's office and kisses her before fleeing. She finds him on the rooftop and accepts his invitation to dinner. At a Chinese restaurant, Markus tells Nathalie that he has been living in France for 15 years, and she tells him about how she loved Pez candy when she traveled to the United States with her father as a child. After their second date, as they walk together, Markus realizes that he is falling in love with Nathalie and that she is too good for him, so he runs away, leaving Nathalie puzzled.

The following day, Markus deliberately ignores Nathalie at work. She later goes to his office and tells him she enjoyed their time together, but he reaffirms his decision to protect himself from heartbreak. Later that day, at an office birthday party for Nathalie's assistant, Nathalie confronts Markus about his attitude in front of their co-workers. In response, he gives her a Pez candy dispenser as a gift. Nathalie and Markus go on another and reconcile.

The next day at work, Charles questions Nathalie about her relationship with Markus, infuriating her. Charles then calls Markus into his office and invites him for a drink that night. At a bar, Charles concludes that Markus is exactly the type of man Nathalie needs: sensitive, kind, and poetic. After helping a drunken Charles into a taxi, Markus meets with Nathalie at a small party at her friend's apartment. When Markus privately voices his discomfort to Nathalie, feeling that other people disapprove of their relationship, she consoles him and takes him to her place, where they fall asleep.

The next day, Nathalie storms into Charles's office and slaps him for interfering in her love life. Charles reveals his plan to offer Markus a job in Stockholm with a higher salary before mentioning Nathalie's deceased husband, prompting her to leave and abandon a major project meeting that had taken three months to prepare. She drives to the countryside where she and François both grew up, though they did not know each other then. En route, she picks up Markus from the Montgeroult–Courcelles station.

Nathalie and Markus visit François's grave before going to Nathalie's grandmother's house, where they are both warmly welcomed. That night, Nathalie and Markus consummate their relationship. In the morning, she shows him the garden, where she used to play hide-and-seek, and he suggests that they play hide-and-seek. As Nathalie counts, Markus imagines her in various stages of her life in that garden, and hides amongst those different versions of her. Nathalie smiles wryly as she finishes her countdown.

== Cast ==
- Audrey Tautou as Nathalie Kerr
- François Damiens as Markus Lundell
- Bruno Todeschini as Charles Delamain, Nathalie's boss
- Mélanie Bernier as Chloé, Nathalie's assistant
- Joséphine de Meaux as Sophie, Nathalie's best friend
- Pio Marmaï as François
- Monique Chaumette as Madeleine, Nathalie's grandmother
- Marc Citti as Pierre, Sophie's boyfriend
- Alexandre Pavloff as Benoît, a member of Nathalie's work group
- Audrey Fleurot as Ingrid, Charles's secretary
- Ariane Ascaride as Nathalie's mother
- Christophe Malavoy as Nathalie's father
- Pom Klementieff as the waitress

== Production ==
Émilie Simon, who provided much of the original music for Delicacy, makes a brief cameo appearance in the film.

== Reception ==
=== Critical response ===
On the review aggregator website Rotten Tomatoes, the film holds an approval rating of 61% based on 70 reviews, with an average rating of 6/10. Metacritic, which uses a weighted average, assigned the film a score of 53 out of 100, based on 21 critics, indicating "mixed or average" reviews.

=== Accolades ===
Award	Year	Category	Recipient	Result
Sarlat Film Festival	2011	Best Actor	François Damiens	Won
César Awards	2012	Best First Feature Film	Delicacy	Nominated
César Awards	2012	César Award for Best Adaptation	David Foenkinos	Nominated
