= Sylvain Jacques =

French musician and film actor (born 1971)

Sylvain Jacques (born in Paris in 1971) is a French musician and film actor.

== Biography ==
His first role was in the theatre in 1998 in a Jean Racine play, Phèdre on the Théâtre de l'Odéon. The same year he landed a role in Ceux qui m'aiment prendront le train a film by Patrice Chéreau. He is remembered mostly for his acting role as Vincent in the award-winning Son frère (English title His Brother) also directed by Chéreau and has appeared in a number of television movies and series.

As a musician, he wrote music for a number of works like Christina Paulhofer's Täter (1999) and Macbeth (2002) and Cyrano de Bergerac (2006), but also for works for Thierry de Peretti, Michel Foucher and Renatte Jett.

In 2003, he formed the duo The Ensemble with Nicolas Baby from Fédération française de funk (FFF). The group released its album The Ensemble 2004.

He co-directed the film musical Kowalski with David Bersanetti. Other music projects he was involved in include Alice, Quartett and Face au paradis in addition to preparing sound effects of a number of films like Walking 2 Hawaï (2003), Récamier (2006), Shadow Words (2008) and others.

== Discography ==
as The Ensemble

- 2004: The Ensemble (album)

== Filmography ==
Actor in films

- 1998: Ceux qui m'aiment prendront le train, (English title Those Who Love Me Can Take the Train) - as Bruno
- 2000: Mamirolle as Manuel
- 2000: Vernissage as Antoine
- 2001: Les Fantômes de Louba as Charlie
- 2003: Son frère, (English His Brother) as Vincent
- 2004: Vendues, (English title Women for Sale) as Sacha

Shorts

- 2000: Amor as lover (short film)
- 2004: Julie Meyer as Christophe (short)
- 2008: Le courrier du parc as the young man (short)

Television

- 1999: Chambre n° 13 as Amor (TV series)
- 2001: Tania Boréalis ou l'étoile d'un été as Alain (TV film)
- 2002: C.I.D (1 episode, "Néonazis" as Marc Montero) (TV series)
- 2005: Le juge est une femme (in 1 episode "Ficelle" as Gilles Bertrand) (TV series)

== Theatre ==
- 1998: Phèdre of Jean Racine in role of Hyppolite (mise en scène by Luc Bondy)
