= Nora Hamzawi =

French humorist, comedian and columnist

- Born: 29 April 1983 (age 43); Cannes, France
- Occupations: Humorist; actress
- Website: norahamzawi.fr

Nora Hamzawi (born 29 April 1983) is a French comedian, actress, writer and columnist. She first performed on stage in the late 2000s and later became known through radio and television appearances. Since the late 2010s, she has appeared regularly in French auteur films. She has also published several books.

== Biography ==
Nora Hamzawi is of Syrian origin by her mother. She was born in Cannes and grew up in Paris. After obtaining a baccalauréat, she enrolled in law school but gave up after three weeks. She then enrolled at IUT Paris Descartes in Infocom and completed her training at CELSA, section "marketing, advertising and communication". She follows in parallel with her studies Cours Florent and Atelier Fanny Vallon.

She went on stage in 2009 with her first one-woman show. She was revealed to the public the same year by the festival Just for Laughs from Nantes. She is also writer for the series Scènes de ménages on M6.

She made a name for herself by appearing on Laurent Ruquier's On n'demande qu'à en rire on France 2 between 15 September 2011 and 19 March 2012, before being eliminated by an insufficient rating from the viewers (10/20). Jean Benguigui said of her: "She does not know how to move, she does not know how to play, she does not even know how to wear a dress!"

Between 2013 and 2015, she played the main role of Oh-Oh de Nora, a small humorous sequence integrated into Le Before du Grand Journal on Canal+. As of 2014, she is also a columnist in Le Grand Journal. After being the guest on TMC's Quotidien in October to present her show, Nora Hamzawi joins Yann Barthès' team on 1 December 2016 and hosts a column entitled "Nora a la réponse" in which she answers children's questions in a humorous way.

In parallel, she worked as a radio columnist on France Inter from 2013 to 2017, first on On va tous y passer and later on La Bande originale.

== Career ==
=== Stage work ===
- 2009: Nora One Woman Show, Théâtre Le Bout, Paris
- 2010: Le Show Inutile, Théâtre de La Loge, Paris
- 2012: Harmonie Hormonale, La Comédie des Trois Bornes, Paris
- 2013–2018: Nora Hamzawi, touring show across France

Since 2024, she has been performing a new solo show in Paris and on tour in France.

=== Filmography ===
==== Cinema ====
- 2012: Réussir sa vie – Benoît Forgeard
- 2013: La Fille du 14 juillet – Antonin Peretjatko
- 2013: L'Ex de ma vie – Dorothée Sebbagh
- 2015: Pension complète – Florent-Emilio Siri
- 2017: Boule et Bill 2 – Pascal Bourdiaux
- 2018: Doubles vies (Non-Fiction) – Olivier Assayas
- 2019: Alice et le Maire – Nicolas Pariser
- 2020: Éléonore – Amro Hamzawi
- 2021: CE2 – Jacques Doillon
- 2023: Un hiver en été – Laetitia Masson
- 2023: Le Syndrome des amours passées – Ann Sirot and Raphaël Balboni
- 2024: Le Tableau volé – Pascal Bonitzer
- 2024: Hors du temps – Olivier Assayas
- 2024: Les Pistolets en plastique – Jean-Christophe Meurisse
- 2025: Adieu Jean-Pat – Cécilia Rouaud

==== Short films ====
- 2010: L'Antivirus of Benoît Forgeard, broadcast on France 2 on 27 Jun 2010
- 2011: Coloscopia of Benoît Forgeard, broadcast on France 2
- 2011: Les Secrets de l'invisible of Antonin Peretjatko

=== Television ===
- 2009–11: writer in Scènes de ménages broadcast on M6
- 2011–12: participant at On n'demande qu'à en rire, Laurent Ruquier's show on France 2
- 2013–15: humorous sequence "Oh-Oh de Nora" in Le Before du Grand Journal on Canal+
- 2013: plays her own role in the miniseries What Ze Teuf on C8
- 2014–15: columnist in Le Grand Journal, with Antoine de Caunes on Canal+
- Since 2016: columnist in Quotidien, with Yann Barthès on TMC
- 2022 : Carla in Irma Vep on HBO

=== Radio ===
- 2013–2014: columnist on On va tous y passer, hosted by Frédéric Lopez (France Inter)
- 2014–2017: columnist on La Bande originale, hosted by Nagui (France Inter)
- 2020: Public imaginaire, original monologue broadcast on France Inter, written and performed during the COVID-19 pandemic

=== Bibliography ===
==== Books ====
- 30 ans (10 ans de thérapie), Mazarine, 2016. ISBN 978-2-86374-443-7
- 35 ans (dont 15 avant Internet), Mazarine, 2021. ISBN 978-2-86374-498-7
- Public imaginaire, Actes Sud, 2021. ISBN 978-2-330-15836-5
- Couple. Splendeurs et misères de la vie à deux, photographs by Stéphan Gladieu, Seuil, 2025. ISBN 978-2-021-56789-3

==== Press ====
- 2014–18: weekly column in Grazia: Dans la tête de Nora Hamzawi

== Distinctions ==
=== Awards ===
- 2012: Audience Award, Festival du rire de la Fontaine d’Argent, Aix-en-Provence
- 2013: SACD Prize, L'Humour en Capitales Festival
- 2017: SACEM Grand Prize for Humour
- 2019: Swann d’Or for Best Female Revelation, Cabourg Film Festival, for Doubles vies

=== Nominations ===
- 2020: César Award – Best Female Revelation, for Doubles vies
- 2020: Molière Award – Best Humour Show
- 2025: Molière Award – Best Humour Show
