= Non-Fiction (film) =

2018 film

- French film poster
- Directed by: Olivier Assayas
- Written by: Olivier Assayas
- Produced by: Charles Gillibert
- Starring: Guillaume Canet; Juliette Binoche; Vincent Macaigne; Nora Hamzawi; Christa Théret; Pascal Greggory
- Cinematography: Yorick Le Saux
- Edited by: Simon Jacquet
- Production company: CG Cinéma
- Distributed by: Ad Vitam
- Release dates: 31 August 2018 (Venice); 16 January 2019 (France)
- Running time: 108 minutes
- Country: France
- Language: French
- Box office: $3.6 million

Non-Fiction (French: Doubles vies) is a 2018 French comedy film directed by Olivier Assayas. It stars Guillaume Canet, Juliette Binoche, Vincent Macaigne, Nora Hamzawi, Christa Théret, and Pascal Greggory. It was selected to be screened in the main competition section of the 75th Venice International Film Festival in 2018. It was released in France on 16 January 2019, by Ad Vitam Distribution.

== Plot ==
Literary editor Alain refuses to publish Léonard's novel for the first time. Alain's company hires a young woman, Laure, to adapt to the digital age. Alain sleeps with Laure. Alain's wife Selena is an actress. She has been having an affair with Léonard for years. Léonard's wife Valérie is a left-wing political consultant. She does not have much interest in her husband's circumstances.

== Cast ==
- Guillaume Canet as Alain Danielson
- Juliette Binoche as Selena
- Vincent Macaigne as Léonard Spiegel
- Christa Théret as Laure
- Nora Hamzawi as Valérie
- Pascal Greggory as Marc-Antoine
- Antoine Reinartz as Blaise

== Production ==
The film's original title was E-book, but Olivier Assayas dropped it because he thought "it was a bit too technical and too cold." It took him about 2 years to finish writing the script. He stated that the film's themes would include "how we adapt or don't adapt to the way the world's changing." The film was shot in Super 16 mm. The shooting took place in Paris.

== Release ==
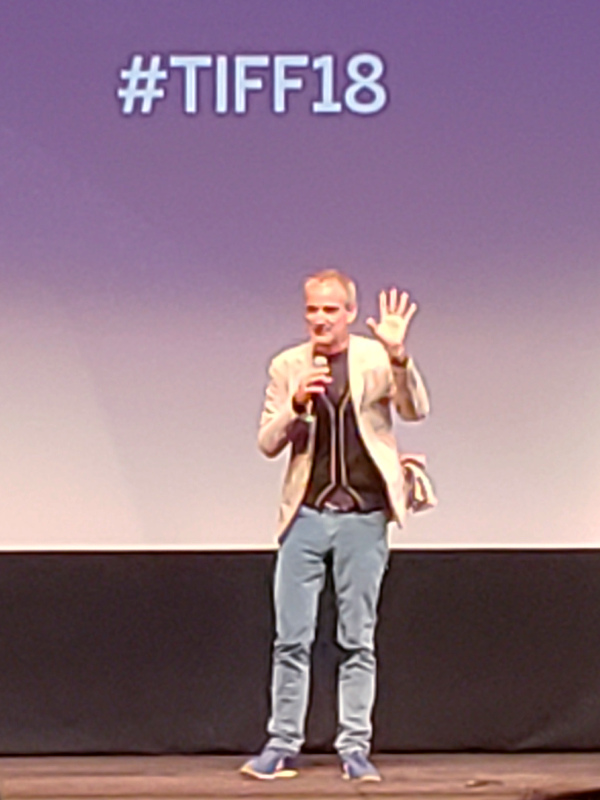
Assayas presenting Non-Fiction at the 2018 Toronto International Film Festival.

The film had its world premiere at the Venice Film Festival on 31 August 2018. Prior to the premiere, Sundance Selects acquired U.S. distribution rights to the film. It also screened at the Toronto International Film Festival on 11 September 2018 and the New York Film Festival on 2 October 2018. It was released in France on 16 January 2019.

== Reception ==
On Rotten Tomatoes, the film has an approval rating of 87% based on 149 reviews, and an average rating of 7.2/10. The website's critical consensus reads: "Well-acted and sharply written, Non-Fiction finds writer-director Olivier Assayas working in a comedic vein that channels classic forebears while remaining utterly fresh." On Metacritic the film has a weighted average score of 79 out of 100, based on 27 critics, indicating "generally favorable reviews".

David Ehrlich of IndieWire gave the film a grade of B+, stating that "this breezy and cautiously optimistic bit of late-career reflection finds Assayas interrogating how we ascribe meaning to things (and value to people) in a world that seems to be remodeling itself faster each day." He described it as "an anxious — but strangely calming! — reminder that change is the only true constant, and that steering the current is a lot easier than fighting it." Jon Frosch of The Hollywood Reporter wrote: "The filmmaker's interest in the forces of globalization — a thematic through-line in a body of work that runs the spectrum from freaky genre exercises to classy period pieces — indeed proves very much present in this witty, resonant, richly perceptive portrait of people caught in the throes of a fast-changing country." Jay Weissberg of Variety praised "the increasing lightness of tone".
