= Bruno Todeschini =

French Swiss actor

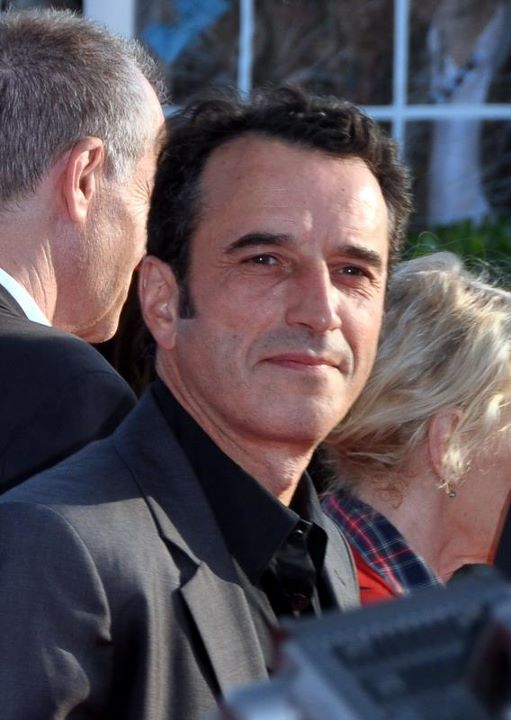
- Bruno Todeschini in 2011
- Born: 19 September 1962 (age 62); Neuchâtel, Switzerland
- Occupation: Actor
- Years active: 1987–present
- Spouse: Sophie Broustal

Bruno Todeschini (born 19 September 1962) is a Franco-Swiss actor.

== Life and career ==
Todeschini studied at L'école supérieure d'art dramatique in Genève and after graduating in 1986, he joined the Théâtre Nanterre-Amandiers, directed by Patrice Chéreau.

He has since then been appearing on television (Les Rois maudits, 2005) and in films, many directed by Chéreau.

== Personal life ==
Todeschini has a child from a previous relationship, a son named Romain, born in 1997. He is married to actress Sophie Broustal, with whom he has a daughter, Paloma, born in August 2003.

He is fluent in French and Italian.

== Selected filmography ==
- 1987 – Hôtel de France
- 1992 – The Sentinel
- 1994 – Coming to Terms with the Dead
- 1995 – Up, Down, Fragile
- 1995 – El pasajero clandestino
- 1997 – Comanche Territory
- 1998 – Those Who Love Me Can Take the Train
- 2000 – Le Libertin
- 2002 – A Private Affair
- 2003 – His Brother
- 2004 – Olgas Sommer
- 2004 – Secret Agents
- 2004 – The Last Day
- 2005 – A Love to Hide (TV)
- 2005 – Les Rois maudits (TV)
- 2005 – La Petite Jérusalem
- 2005 – Good Girl
- 2006 – 7 Years
- 2007 – Fallen Heroes
- 2008 – This Night
- 2009 – Lourdes
- 2010 – Orly
- 2011 – Delicacy
- 2011 – The Bird
- 2013 – Mary Queen of Scots
- 2014 – The Connection
- 2015 – Papa lumière
- 2016 – Capitaine Marleau (1 Episode)
- 2016 – The Next Skin
- 2017 – Jalouse
- 2022 – One Year, One Night
