= Pascal Greggory =

French actor (born 1954)

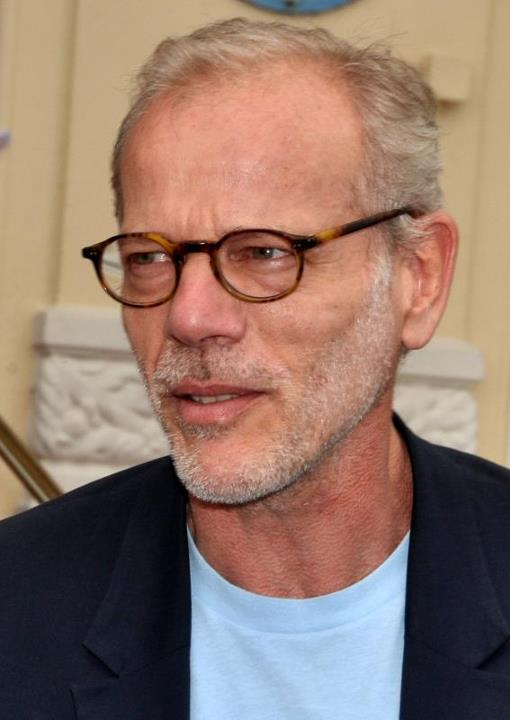
- Greggory at the 2012 Cabourg Film Festival
- Born: 8 September 1954 (age 72); Paris, France
- Occupation: Actor
- Years active: 1976–present

Pascal Greggory (born 8 September 1954) is a French actor.

== Personal life ==
Greggory is openly gay. He had long-term relationships with Patrice Chéreau and François-Marie Banier.

== Filmography ==
- Les Sœurs Brontë (1979) by André Téchiné
- Catherine de Heilbronn (1980, TV) by Éric Rohmer
- Le crime d'amour (1983) by Guy Gilles
- Pauline à la plage (1983) by Éric Rohmer
- Le trio en si bémol (1988, TV) by Éric Rohmer
- L'Arbre, le maire et la médiathèque (1993) by Éric Rohmer
- La Soif de l'or (1993) by Gérard Oury
- La Reine Margot (1994) by Patrice Chéreau
- La Rivière Espérance (1995, TV) by Josée Dayan
- Ceux qui m'aiment prendront le train (1998) by Patrice Chéreau
- Zonzon (1998) by Laurent Bouhnik
- Le Temps retrouvé (1999) by Raoul Ruiz
- The Messenger: The Story of Joan of Arc (1999) by Luc Besson
- La Confusion des Genres (2000) by Ilan Duran Cohen
- La Fidélité (2000) by Andrzej Żuławski
- La vie promise (2002) by Olivier Dahan
- Son frère (2003) by Patrice Chéreau (cameo)
- Arsène Lupin (2004) by Jean-Paul Salomé
- Gabrielle (2005) by Patrice Chéreau
- La Tourneuse De Pages (2006) by Denis Dercourt
- La Vie en Rose (2007) by Olivier Dahan
- La France (2008) by Serge Bozon
- Geliebte Clara (2008) by Helma Sanders-Brahms
- The Ball of the Actresses (2009) by Maïwenn
- Walled In (2009) by Gilles Paquet-Brenner
- Rebecca H. (Return to the Dogs) (2010)
- A Distant Neighborhood (2010) by Sam Garbarski
- Bye Bye Blondie (2012)
- Portrait of the Artist (2014)
- Tout de suite maintenant (2016)
- The Frozen Dead (2017, TV)
- Three Adventures of Brooke (2018)
- Frankie (2019)
- Our Lady of the Nile (2019)
- Irma Vep (2022, TV) by Olivier Assayas
- One Fine Morning (2022)
- Jeanne du Barry (2023)
- Melpomene (2025) by Charlotte Dauphin
- The Illusion (2025) by Roberto Andò
