= Intimacy (novel) =

Book by Hanif Kureishi

- First edition (publ. Faber & Faber)
- Author: Hanif Kureishi
- Language: English
- Publisher: Faber & Faber
- Publication date: 1998

Intimacy is a 1998 novel by Hanif Kureishi. The novel explores the inner thoughts of a middle-aged man contemplating leaving his wife and two young sons.

== Plot summary ==
Set in contemporary London, the story tells why the protagonist wants to leave his family. The events of the novel unfold over approximately 24 hours.

He has lived with his partner for six years and has known her for ten. He is unhappy in his relationship and has had several affairs. His young lover one day says to him, "If you want me, I'm here". He spends 24 hours reflecting on his relationships with his wife, sons, friends and lover.

== Film adaptation ==
Intimacy was adapted into a 2001 film of the same name directed by Patrice Chéreau, starring Mark Rylance and Kerry Fox.
