= Irma Vep (miniseries) =

2022 television miniseries by Olivier Assayas

- Genre: Comedy drama
- Created by: Olivier Assayas
- Based on: Irma Vep by Olivier Assayas
- Written by: Olivier Assayas
- Directed by: Olivier Assayas
- Starring: Alicia Vikander; Vincent Macaigne
- Composer: Thurston Moore
- Countries of origin: United States; France
- Original languages: English; French
- No. of episodes: 8

Production
- Executive producers: Olivier Assayas; Alicia Vikander; Ravi Nandan; Hallie Sekoff; Stuart Manashil; Kevin Turen; Ashley Levinson; Sam Levinson; Sylvie Barthet; Daniel Delume
- Producer: Jes Anderson
- Production locations: Île-de-France, France
- Cinematography: Yorick Le Saux; Denis Lenoir
- Editors: Marion Monnier; François Gédigier; Simon Jacquet
- Camera setup: Single-camera
- Running time: 46–58 minutes
- Production companies: A24; Vortex Sutra; The Reasonable Bunch; Tiny Goat

Original release
- Network: HBO (United States); OCS City (France)
- Release: June 6 – July 25, 2022

Irma Vep is a comedy drama television miniseries created, written and directed by Olivier Assayas for HBO. Based on Assayas's 1996 film, the series premiered at the 2022 Cannes Film Festival on May 22. It debuted on June 6, 2022, and concluded on July 25, consisting of eight episodes.

It stars Alicia Vikander as Mira, an American movie star who comes to France to star as Irma Vep in a television series adaptation of the French silent film serial Les Vampires, and Vincent Macaigne as René, the director of the adaptation. It also features an ensemble supporting cast, including Adria Arjona, Byron Bowers, Jeanne Balibar, Vincent Lacoste, Nora Hamzawi, Hippolyte Girardot, Devon Ross, Alex Descas, Antoine Reinartz, and Lars Eidinger.

Irma Vep received highly positive reviews from critics, who praised Vikander's performance and Assayas's direction.

== Premise ==
Irma Vep revolves around Mira, an American movie star disillusioned by her career and a recent breakup, who comes to France to star as Irma Vep in a television series adaptation of the French silent film serial Les Vampires. Set against the backdrop of a lurid crime thriller, Mira struggles as the distinctions between herself and the character she plays begin to blur and merge.

== Cast ==
=== Starring ===
- Alicia Vikander as Mira Harberg, a Swedish-born American actress keen to change the direction of her career and shake off a recent tabloid scandal.
  - Vikander also portrays Musidora during flashback scenes.
- Vincent Macaigne as René Vidal, the director of the television series whose history of anxiety disorders, incoherent artistic vision, and constant clashes with the cast, crew and producers all threaten to derail the project.
  - Macaigne also portrays Louis Feuillade during flashback scenes.

=== Recurring co-stars ===
- Adria Arjona as Laurie, Mira's ex-assistant and ex-girlfriend. After things did not end well with Mira, she married Herman.
- Byron Bowers as Herman Ray, a Hollywood filmmaker who is in Paris to promote his latest film
- Jeanne Balibar as Zoe, a costume designer. She supplies drugs to Gottfried and is attracted to Mira.
- Vincent Lacoste as Edmond Lagrange, a French actor hired to play Philippe Guérande
- Nora Hamzawi as Carla, assistant director.
  - Hamzawi also portrays Feuillade's assistant during flashback scenes.
- Hippolyte Girardot as Robert Danjou, a French actor hired to play the Grand Vampire.
  - Girardot also portrays Jean Ayme during a flashback scene in the fifth episode.
- Devon Ross as Regina, a cinephile and Mira's assistant
- Alex Descas as Grégory Desormeaux, a producer. Descas is reprising his role from the 1996 movie.
- Antoine Reinartz as Jérémie, a camera operator
- Carrie Brownstein as Zelda, Mira's agent. She is not interested in the Vampires project and does not accept that Mira is uninterested in playing the girlfriend in the upcoming "Silver Surfer" movie, despite Mira's repeated refusal of the role.
- Lars Eidinger as Gottfried, a drug-addicted German actor hired to play Juan-José Moréno.
  - Eidinger also portrays Fernand Herrmann during a flashback scene in the sixth episode.
- Tom Sturridge as Eamonn, Mira's ex-boyfriend. He's in Paris for a movie, and they have not seen each other since they broke up.
- Fala Chen as Cynthia Keng, a rising star from Hong Kong hired by René Vidal to play Irma Vep's provocative accomplice and part of the Vampires' plans.
- Pascal Greggory as Gautier Parcheminerie, a man who is financing the series so that Mira agrees to work on a campaign for his cosmetics brand
- Dominique Reymond as René's therapist
- Dancer Angelin Preljocaj as choreographer Volodia.

=== Other co-stars ===
- Sigrid Bouaziz as Séverine, a French actress hired to play Marfa Koutiloff, and Edmond's ex-girlfriend
- Vivian Wu as Jade Lee, René's ex-wife who played Irma Vep in its previous remake. Archival footage of Maggie Cheung from the 1996 movie is used when Jade appears as Irma.
- Lou Lampros as Galatée, an aspiring actress hired to play Jeanne Brémontier.
  - Lampros also portrays Louise Lagrange during a flashback scene in the eighth episode.

Additionally, Valérie Bonneton portrays Mira's French PR, Élizabeth Mazev appears as Musidora in an interview from 1947, while Jean-Luc Vincent portrays the host. Denis Podalydès appears as the Police Prefect during a flashback scene, Maya Persaud plays Sandra, a member of the production, and Jérôme Commandeur portrays Angus, a production executive. Alexandre Steiger plays Jules, an actor portraying Mazamette, while Stefan Bohne appears as Thor, a bondage consultant on the series, Mélodie Richard as Aurélia, an actress portraying Augustine, and Maud Wyler as Rebekah, an actress portraying Mme D'Alba.

Also appearing are Nathalie Richard as Ondine, Calypso Valois as Edmond's Girlfriend, Maya Sansa as Grégory's wife, Jess Liaudin as the actor portraying Satanas, Bertrand Pazos as Sacha Guitry, and Laurent Papot as Albert Willemetz. French comic Panayotis Pascot cameo as a young executive, and Aude Pépin as the voice of René's wife. Kristen Stewart appears in the eighth episode as Lianna, a famous pop star and Eamonn's girlfriend who recently suffered a miscarriage.

== Episodes ==
No.	Title	Directed by	Written by	Original release date	U.S. viewers (millions)
1	"The Severed Head"	Olivier Assayas	Olivier Assayas	June 6, 2022	0.071
2	"The Ring that Kills"	Olivier Assayas	Olivier Assayas	June 13, 2022	0.046
3	"Dead Man's Escape"	Olivier Assayas	Olivier Assayas	June 20, 2022	0.049
4	"The Poisoner"	Olivier Assayas	Olivier Assayas	June 27, 2022	0.042
5	"Hypnotic Eyes"	Olivier Assayas	Olivier Assayas	July 4, 2022	0.039
6	"The Thunder Master"	Olivier Assayas	Olivier Assayas	July 11, 2022	0.031
7	"The Spectre"	Olivier Assayas	Olivier Assayas	July 18, 2022	0.045
8	"The Terrible Wedding"	Olivier Assayas	Olivier Assayas	July 25, 2022	0.073

== Production ==
Assayas started developing the miniseries in May 2020 as a loose adaptation of the film, with it being officially ordered by HBO in December 2020 and to be written and directed by Assayas.

=== Casting ===
In December 2020, Alicia Vikander was announced to have been cast in the leading role. In July 2021, Adria Arjona, Carrie Brownstein, Jerrod Carmichael, Fala Chen and Devon Ross were cast. In August, Byron Bowers and Tom Sturridge were cast, with Sturridge replacing Carmichael who had to depart the project due to scheduling conflicts. In November, several new roles were announced, including Vincent Macaigne, Jeanne Balibar, Lars Eidinger, Vincent Lacoste, Hippolyte Girardot, Alex Descas, Nora Hamzawi and Antoine Reinartz, with Macaigne cast as the director of the film and the rest of the announced as cast and crew. In an interview with The New Yorker, Kristen Stewart revealed that she was cast in a small part.

=== Filming ===
Principal photography began on June 14, 2021 in Île-de-France, mostly in Paris and its suburbs, and took place over one hundred days. Some of the locations used by the production include the Opéra-Comique, the Champs-Élysées, Montmartre, the Gare du Nord, and the Charles de Gaulle Airport.

=== Music ===
The song playing during the opening credits is Mdou Moctar's "Ya Habibti". Additional music throughout the first episode is from Jonny Easton's "Follow The Light" album.

=== Costumes ===
Jürgen Doering created the costumes for the series while Louis Vuitton's creative director Nicolas Ghesquière is the designer behind Irma Vep's costume.

== Release ==
The series premiered on June 6, 2022, on HBO in the United States. It also streams on HBO Max. In France, episodes premiere on OCS's streaming service the morning after the American broadcast then aired on OCS City on the evening.

Unlike many series that alternate dialogue in French and in another language, the production decided to not dub the English-language scenes in French for the French broadcast. A version with the English dialogues dubbed was later produced when the series was added on HBO Max in France.

== Reception ==
Irma Vep was met with critical acclaim upon release, with praise towards Vikander's performance. On the review aggregator website Rotten Tomatoes, the series holds an approval rating of 95%, based on 57 reviews with an average rating of 7.8/10. The site's critical consensus reads: "Catnip for cinephiles and a welcome spotlight for the spellbinding Alicia Vikander, Irma Vep is a worthwhile expansion of writer-director Olivier Assayas' cinematic opus". On Metacritic, it has a score of 84 out of 100, based on 21 reviews, indicating "universal acclaim".

Following its premiere at the 75th Cannes Film Festival, Daniel Fienberg of The Hollywood Reporter described the series as "loose and intellectually loopy, broad and jokey one moment and wallowing in sad self-absorption the next" and found Vikander's performance "wonderfully light and open".

In his review for Variety, Daniel D'Addario commended Vikander's performance, concluding: "If big-budget moviemaking is a prison, then Vikander-as-Mira, sylphlike and darting, is going to wiggle out between the bars." David Cote of The A.V. Club graded it with an "A" and praised Assayas's direction, writing "It's a masterful handling of visual vocabularies, arguably the most sophisticated serial moviemaking HBO has ever produced". RogerEbert.com's Brian Tallerico called it a "smart, twisting look behind-the-scenes, and a reminder that Olivier Assayas is one of the best alive today in the filmmaking business, and apparently TV too". In his review for The Ringer, Adam Nayman wrote, "The pleasures of a show like Irma Vep lie in its relentless cleverness and post-modern sophistication—the way it flaunts its own intelligence and frame of reference", praising the characters and direction.
