= Bono: In Conversation with Michka Assayas =

- Author: Michka Assayas; Bono
- Genre: Biography
- Publisher: Riverhead Books
- Publication date: 2005
- Pages: 326
- ISBN: 1-57322-309-3

Bono: In Conversation with Michka Assayas (also known as Bono on Bono) is a 2005 book by music journalist Michka Assayas. The format is an extended interview that Assayas had with Bono over a period of several years. Bono discusses his upbringing, U2's beginnings, his bandmates, his personal life, his faith and the effects of his celebrity status.

== Chapters ==
1. Stories to tell that are not songs
2. Never trust a performer
3. Everybody gets out of here alive
4. Who's the Elvis here?
5. The shortest chapter in the book
6. The tattooist (El tatuador)
7. At the bottom of the glass
8. The occasional missing leg
9. Thou shalt not go to America
10. My life as a disaster groupie
11. Add eternity to that
12. The girl with the beard
13. 5 Thirteen is an unlucky number
14. I am never going to fit Tutankhamon's Coffin
15. From the tents of Amhara to sleeping in Brezhnev's bed
16. Faith versus luck
17. Tidying my room
