= 7 Years (film) =

- Theatrical release poster
- French: 7 ans
- Directed by: Jean-Pascal Hattu
- Written by: Jean-Pascal Hattu
- Screenplay by: Jean-Pascal Hattu; Gilles Taurand; Guillaume Daporta
- Produced by: Justin Taurand
- Starring: Valérie Donzelli; Cyril Troley; Bruno Todeschini
- Cinematography: Pascal Poucet
- Edited by: Anne Klotz
- Music by: Franck Delabre
- Production company: Les Films du Bélier
- Distributed by: Pyramide Distribution
- Release dates: September 3, 2006 (Venice Film Festival); February 21, 2007 (France)
- Running time: 86 minutes
- Country: France
- Language: French

7 Years (French: 7 ans) is a 2006 French drama film starring Bruno Todeschini, Valerie Donzelli and Cyril Troley. It is written and directed by Jean-Pascal Hattu. The film explores the sexual tension between a wife and a husband serving a long jail sentence. Valerie Donzelli's performance in the film won her awards at the Seattle International Film Festival and at the Valencia Festival of Mediterranean Cinema

== Plot ==
Maïté (Valerie Donzelli) is the devoted young wife of Vincent (Bruno Todeschini), who is serving 7 years in prison for an unspecified crime. She brings Vincent clean clothes, and puts money in his canteen account. She and Vincent obviously still need each other sexually, and it is difficult for both of them to be separated.

One day Maïté is approached by a young man named Jean (Cyril Troley), who says his brother is also incarcerated for 7 years. They quickly embark on a sexual relationship, but Maïté is cold and unresponsive.

She has a good relationship with her neighbour, Djamila, who has a small son, Julien. Maïté looks after him frequently whilst Djamila is at work, and the two are close. Eventually Maïté discovers that Jean is in fact a guard at her husband's prison. The affair takes a turn when Vincent finds out; instead of stopping them, he insists Jean tape their meetings. He advises Jean how to move Maïté emotionally and sexually, however, Jean tells him "she is empty".

As Jean falls in love with Maïté, she tries to distance herself from both of them. However, as Jean leaves to take up a post in Lille, Vincent attempts suicide and in final scene she is seen walking confidently into the prison to visit him once again.

== Cast ==
- Valérie Donzelli as Maïté
- Cyril Troley as Jean
- Bruno Todeschini as Vincent
- Pablo de la Torre as Julien
- Nadia Kaci as Djamila

== Awards ==
- New Director's Showcase Special Jury Prize - Seattle International Film Festival 2007 - Won
- Best Actress - Valencia Festival of Mediterranean Cinema 2007 - Won
