= Those Who Love Me Can Take the Train =

- French: Ceux qui m'aiment prendront le train
- Directed by: Patrice Chéreau
- Written by: Danièle Thompson; Patrice Chéreau; Pierre Trividic
- Produced by: Charles Gassot; Jacques Hinstin
- Starring: Pascal Greggory
- Cinematography: Eric Gautier
- Edited by: François Gédigier
- Music by: Éric Neveux
- Distributed by: BAC Films
- Release date: 15 May 1998
- Running time: 122 minutes
- Country: France
- Language: French
- Budget: $8.5 million
- Box office: $3.8 million

Those Who Love Me Can Take the Train (French: Ceux qui m'aiment prendront le train) is a 1998 French drama film directed by Patrice Chéreau and written by Chéreau, Danièle Thompson and Pierre Trividic. It stars Pascal Greggory, Vincent Perez, Charles Berling and Dominique Blanc.

== Plot ==
The film follows the friends of a recently deceased minor painter, Jean-Baptiste Emmerich, as they take a train from Paris to Limoges, where he is to be buried, attend his funeral, then gather at the home of his twin brother, Lucien. The mourners include François, who spends the journey listening to a series of taped conversations with the painter; Jean-Marie and Claire, a couple whose marriage has broken down; Emmerich's former lover Lucie; Louis, a close friend of François; and Bruno, a young man with whom he has fallen in love. As the train heads south, the travelers watch the car carrying Emmerich's coffin being driven recklessly alongside the train by their friend Thierry.

At the funeral Jean-Marie makes a speech condemning family life, and declares, to Claire's anger, that he will never become a father. At the gathering after the funeral the guests argue about which of them was closest to Emmerich. Claire discovers that a young woman present, Viviane, was actually Emmerich's son Frédéric, who has become a woman.

== Background and filming ==
The inspiration for the film, and its title, came from a request the documentary filmmaker François Reichenbach made to those attending his funeral.

The sequences on the train were filmed over 14 days in two carriages on trains running between Paris and Mulhouse. Chereau said: "You cannot really fabricate the movement of a train in a studio - the actors and the camera moving at the same time. We needed to have the real energy of that journey". Reviewing the film for Sight & Sound, Chris Darke wrote: "the journey to Limoges is a triumph both of exposition and choreography.....Gautier's use of handheld 'Scope cinematography gives the feeling of both buffeting movement and swooping detail."

== Cast ==
- Pascal Greggory as François
- Valeria Bruni Tedeschi as Claire (as Valeria Bruni-Tedeschi)
- Charles Berling as Jean-Marie
- Jean-Louis Trintignant – Lucien Emmerich / Jean-Baptiste Emmerich
- Bruno Todeschini as Louis
- Sylvain Jacques as Bruno
- Vincent Perez as Viviane
- Roschdy Zem as Thierry
- Dominique Blanc as Catherine
- Delphine Schiltz as Elodie
- Nathan Kogen as Sami (as Nathan Cogan)
- Marie Daëms as Lucie
- Chantal Neuwirth as Geneviève
- Thierry de Peretti as Dominique
- Olivier Gourmet as Bernard

== Awards and nominations ==
- British Independent Film Awards (UK)
  - Nominated: Best Foreign Language Film
- 1998 Cannes Film Festival (France)
  - Nominated: Golden Palm (Patrice Chéreau)
- 24th César Awards (France)
  - Won: Best Actress – Supporting Role (Dominique Blanc)
  - Won: Best Cinematography (Eric Gautier)
  - Won: Best Director (Patrice Chéreau)
  - Nominated: Best Actor – Leading Role (Pascal Greggory)
  - Nominated: Best Actor – Supporting Role (Vincent Perez)
  - Nominated: Best Actor – Supporting Role (Jean-Louis Trintignant)
  - Nominated: Best Editing (François Gédigier)
  - Nominated: Best Film
  - Nominated: Best Production Design (Sylvain Chauvelot and Richard Peduzzi)
  - Nominated: Best Sound (Guillaume Sciama and Jean-Pierre Laforce)
  - Nominated: César Award for Best Original Screenplay or Adaptation (Patrice Chéreau, Danièle Thompson and Pierre Trividic)
- Étoiles d'Or (France)
  - Won: Best Actor – Leading Role (Charles Berling)
  - Won: Best Director (Patrice Chéreau)
