= Clean (2004 film) =

- Film poster
- Directed by: Olivier Assayas
- Written by: Olivier Assayas; Malachy Martin; Sarah Perry
- Produced by: Niv Fichman; Xavier Giannoli; Xavier Marchand; Sarah Perry; Edouard Weil
- Starring: Maggie Cheung; Nick Nolte; Béatrice Dalle
- Cinematography: Eric Gautier
- Edited by: Luc Barnier
- Music by: David Roback; Brian Eno; Tricky
- Production companies: BFI; Arte France Cinéma; Canal+ Téléfilm Canada
- Distributed by: ARP Sélection (France); Vertigo Films (United Kingdom); TVA Films (Canada)
- Release dates: 27 March 2004 (Belfast); 1 September 2004 (France)
- Running time: 111 minutes
- Countries: France; United Kingdom; Canada
- Languages: French; English; Cantonese
- Budget: €5.34 million (~$6.2 million)
- Box office: $2,971,219

Clean is a 2004 drama film directed by French director Olivier Assayas, starring Maggie Cheung and Nick Nolte. It was jointly funded by Canada, France, and United Kingdom sources. It was released in the United States in 2006.

== Plot ==
Emily Wang (Maggie Cheung), a former video jockey, has been in a tempestuous relationship for several years with Lee Hauser (played by James Johnston of Nick Cave and the Bad Seeds), a rock musician. Lee's friends feel that Emily is bad for him, describing her as a junkie. Their young son, Jay, is living in Vancouver with Lee's parents.

As the film opens, the pair have arrived in Hamilton, Canada, to see Metric perform. Following an argument in their motel room, Emily walks out and, after taking heroin, falls asleep in her car. When she returns the following morning, she finds that Lee has died of a drug overdose, and the Ontario Provincial Police are investigating. As Emily attempts to force her way into the room, the police find heroin in her bag and she is arrested.

Emily spends six months in jail and, upon release, discovers that custody of her son has been awarded to Lee's parents. She resolves to return to Paris, where she used to live. Before leaving, she briefly meets Albrecht, Lee's father (played by Nick Nolte), who tells her that he would prefer that she not see Jay for a few years.

In Paris, Emily begins work in a Chinese restaurant owned by relatives but does not enjoy it. She has become addicted to methadone and relies on her friends for prescriptions. Meanwhile, Lee's mother, Rosemary (played by Martha Henry) falls ill and she and Albrecht travel to London with Jay for medical treatment. While they are there, Albrecht decides to take Jay to meet Emily, but the boy has been told by his grandmother that Emily was responsible for his father's death and does not want to see her.

Emily eventually decides that she must get clean in order to be able to spend time with her son. She stops taking methadone and prepares for Jay's arrival. When the boy eventually meets her, she takes him to a zoo and explains her relationship with his father and why they took drugs. Emily also has become a singer; when she is given the opportunity arising from meeting a fellow musician in prison, she must make some serious decisions about her life.

== Cast ==
- Maggie Cheung as Emily Wang
- Nick Nolte as Albrecht Hauser
- Béatrice Dalle as Elena, a friend of Emily
- Jeanne Balibar as Irene Paolini, Emily's former employer
- Emily Haines as herself
- Tricky as himself

== Production ==
Assayas and Cheung met during the making of Irma Vep in 1996. They married in 1998 and divorced in 2001. Clean was their first collaboration since the divorce and their second and currently last since Irma Vep.

== Music ==
The songs that Maggie Cheung performs in the film were written and produced by David Roback of Mazzy Star. The soundtrack also features songs by Brian Eno, Daniel Lanois, Emily Haines, Metric, The Notwist, Britta Phillips and Tricky.

1. Brian Eno — "An Ending"
2. Maggie Cheung — "Strawberry Stain"
3. Brian Eno — "Third Uncle"
4. Tricky & Liz Densmore — "Breakaway"
5. Maggie Cheung — "Down in the Light"
6. Metric — "Dead Disco"
7. Brian Eno — "Spider and I"
8. The Notwist — "Neon Golden"
9. Maggie Cheung — "Wait for Me"
10. Britta Phillips — "Knives from Bavaria"
11. Maggie Cheung — "She Can't Tell You"
12. Metric — "Dead Disco (Live)"

== Critical response ==
On Rotten Tomatoes, the film has a rating of 73% based on 66 reviews and an average rating of 6.64/10. The consensus statement reads, "In one of her best roles, Cheung gives a believable and arresting performance as a recovering addict." On Metacritic, the film has a score of 75 out of 100 based on 28 reviews, indicating "generally favorable reviews".

== Accolades ==
| Award / Film Festival | Category | Recipients and nominees | Result |
|---|---|---|---|
| Cannes Film Festival | Palme d'Or | Olivier Assayas | Nominated |
| Cannes Film Festival | Best Actress | Maggie Cheung | Won |
| Cannes Film Festival | Technical Grand Prize | Eric Gautier | Won |
| César Awards | Best Actress | Maggie Cheung | Nominated |
| César Awards | Best Cinematography | Eric Gautier | Nominated |
