= Intimacy (2001 film) =

Erotic drama film by Patrice Chéreau

- French theatrical release poster
- Directed by: Patrice Chéreau
- Screenplay by: Anne-Louise Trividic; Patrice Chéreau
- Based on: Intimacy by Hanif Kureishi
- Produced by: Patrick Cassavetti; Jacques Hinstin
- Starring: Kerry Fox; Mark Rylance; Timothy Spall; Philippe Calvario; Alastair Galbraith; Marianne Faithfull
- Cinematography: Eric Gautier
- Edited by: François Gédigier
- Music by: Éric Neveux
- Production companies: Téléma; StudioCanal; Arte France Cinéma; France 2 Cinéma; WDR/Arte; Mikado Film; Azor Films
- Distributed by: BAC Films (France); Pathé Distribution (United Kingdom); Prokino Filmverleih (Germany); Mikado Film (Italy)
- Release dates: 20 January 2001 (Sundance); 28 March 2001 (France); 4 May 2001 (Italy); 7 June 2001 (Germany); 27 July 2001 (United Kingdom)
- Running time: 107 minutes; 119 minutes (France)
- Countries: France; United Kingdom; Germany; Italy
- Language: English
- Box office: $2.7 million

Intimacy is a 2001 erotic drama film directed by Patrice Chéreau from a screenplay he co-wrote with Anne-Louise Trividic, based on stories by Hanif Kureishi (who also wrote a novel of the same title). It stars Kerry Fox and Mark Rylance. The film is an international co-production between France, the United Kingdom, Germany and Italy, featuring a soundtrack of pop songs from the 1970s and 1980s. Intimacy contains an unsimulated fellatio scene by Fox on Rylance. A French-dubbed version features voice actors Jean-Hugues Anglade and Nathalie Richard.

The film has been associated with the New French Extremity.

== Plot ==
Jay is a bartender who abandoned his family because his wife lost interest in him and their relationship. Now living alone in a decrepit house in London, he has intense sex every Wednesday with a woman whose name he does not know. At first, their relationship is purely physical, but he develops an emotional attachment to her.

Jay is frustrated at work when his boss employs a junior barman, Ian, without consulting him, but later takes Ian under his wing.

Wanting to know more about the woman, Jay follows her across the streets of London to the grey suburbs where she lives. He then follows her to a pub theatre where she is working as an actress in the evenings. Jay learns that her name is Claire, and she has a husband, Andy, a black cab driver, and a son, Leo. Jay befriends Andy and Leo, but Claire remains unaware that they are in contact.

Jay's deadbeat friend Victor arrives unexpectedly to stay with Jay. Jay reluctantly allows him to stay but then throws him out on Wednesday before Claire is due to arrive. However, Claire does not come. Sometime later, Jay and Ian go to a squat to rescue Victor, as he has apparently fallen into drug abuse. Victor accuses Jay of being heartless. With Victor's encouragement, Jay has sex with a woman he meets there, but abruptly leaves in the morning.

Jay confides in Andy about his failed marriage and that he is having an affair with a mystery woman who he sees every Wednesday. Andy introduces Jay to Claire after a play, and makes a point of mentioning Jay's affair to her. Andy and Claire later argue. Andy claims he doesn't care about the affair but that she is a bad actress who will never get anywhere, and that her persisting with it infuriates him. She tells him she's not going to leave him.

Andy visits Jay's bar and obliquely makes it apparent that he knows about the affair. The next Wednesday, Claire arrives at Jay's house while Ian and Victor are helping him to clear it. She makes it clear to Jay that she will not leave her family, and won't see him anymore. They have sex one final time, then Claire leaves without looking back.

== Cast ==
- Kerry Fox as Claire
- Mark Rylance as Jay
- Susannah Harker as Susan, Jay's Wife
- Alastair Galbraith as Victor
- Philippe Calvario as Ian
- Timothy Spall as Andy, Claire's Husband
- Marianne Faithfull as Betty
- Fraser Ayres as Dave
- Michael Fitzgerald as Bar Owner
- Robert Addie as Bar Owner
- Rebecca Palmer as Pam, Girl In Squat

== Reception ==
Intimacy was placed at 91 on Slant Magazine's best films of the 2000s.

In a 2001 lengthy column for The Guardian, Alexander Linklater described the jealousy he experienced when his partner Kerry Fox took the real-sex role in this movie. Linklater concludes that he accepted the unsimulated oral scene, but he insists that the sexual intercourse is an illusion. Nevertheless, critics have declared its realist tendencies. Linda Williams, for instance, writes that "Intimacy opens with urgent, hurried and explicit penetrative sex" and Tanya Krzywinska writes that in this first scene "the spectator is left in little doubt that penetration has occurred".

On the review aggregator website Rotten Tomatoes, 66% of 71 critics' reviews are positive. The website's consensus reads: "Acted out with both physical and psychological nakedness by its two leads, Intimacy is an unflinchingly honest look at alienation." Metacritic, which uses a weighted average, assigned the film a score of 69 out of 100, based on 23 critics, indicating "generally favorable" reviews.

In a 2015 interview with The Wall Street Journal, Mark Rylance spoke of his experience on the film. At the time of the film's release, talk of the film's unsimulated sex scenes in tabloids added stress on his marriage. Rylance commented, "It soured me on my life two months. It’s my mistake, but I felt Patrice [Chéreau] put undue pressure on me on set to do that. And at that point I didn’t have the confidence as a film actor to say no. Now I think a lot of actors that people say are difficult are actually just being sensible.”

== Awards ==
Intimacy won the Golden Bear for Best Film and the Silver Bear for Best Actress (Kerry Fox) at the Berlin Film Festival in 2001.

== See also ==
- Unsimulated sex
