= Le trio en mi bémol =

- Directed by: Éric Rohmer
- Starring: Pascal Greggory; Jessica Forde
- Release date: 1988
- Running time: 75 minutes

Le Trio en mi bémol is a brief filmed theatrical comedy directed by Éric Rohmer in 1988 starring Pascal Greggory and Jessica Forde. It runs for 75 minutes.

== Plot ==
Paul and Adèle were once lovers but are still good friends one year after being separated. The key of E-flat may be the key of true friendship, but it is Mozart that pushes them apart.
