= David Foenkinos =

French author and screenwriter

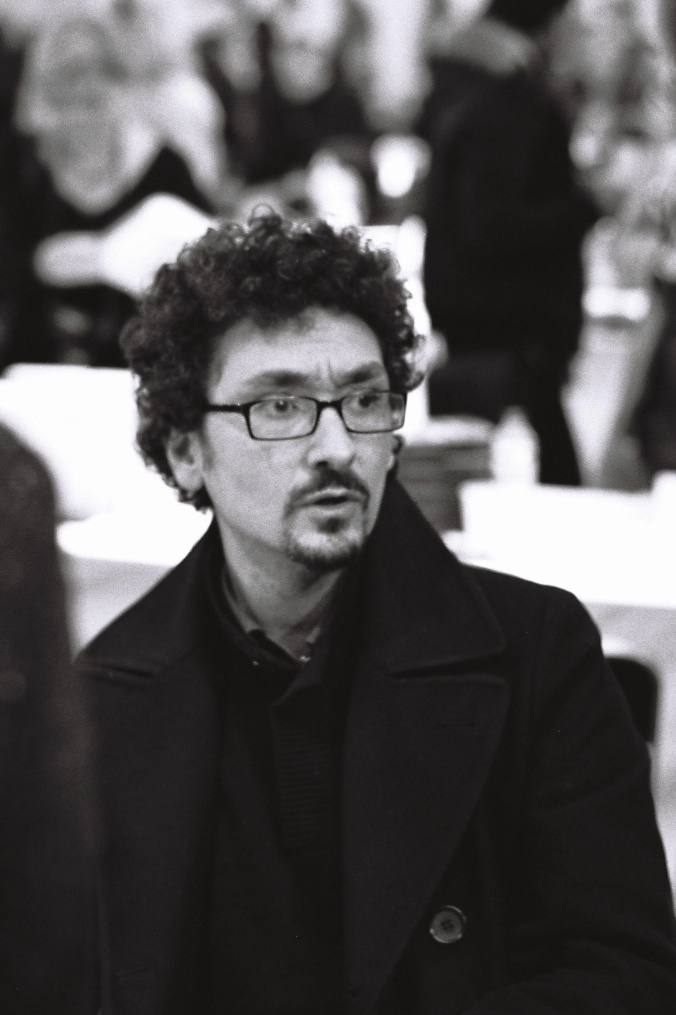
- Born: David Foenkinos; 28 October 1974 (age 52); Paris, France
- Occupations: Novelist, Screenwriter, Musician

David Foenkinos (born 28 October 1974 in Paris), is a French novelist, playwright, screenwriter and director who studied both literature and music in Paris.

His novel La délicatesse is a bestseller in France. A film based on the book was released in December 2011, with Audrey Tautou as the main character. His novels have appeared in over forty languages, and in 2014 he was awarded the Prix Renaudot for his novel Charlotte.

== Biography ==
=== Early years ===
Growing up in a home with few books and often absent parents, David Foenkinos read and wrote little during his childhood. At 16, he required emergency surgery as a result of a rare pleural infection and spent several months recuperating in hospital, where he began to devour books, learning to paint and play the guitar. From this experience, he says, he kept a drive for life, a force that he wanted to convey through his books.

=== Education and career ===
He studied literature at the Sorbonne and music in a jazz school, eventually becoming a guitar teacher. In the evenings, he was a waiter in a restaurant. After unsuccessfully trying to set up a music group, he turned his hand to writing.

After a handful of failed manuscripts, he found his style, and his first novel Inversion de l'idiotie: de l'influence de deux Polonais (“Inversion of idiocy: influenced by two Poles”), though refused by many other publishers, was published by Gallimard in 2002; the book earned him the François-Mauriac literary prize, awarded by the Académie Française.

David Foenkinos is the brother of director Stéphane Foenkinos.

== Filmography ==
- 2011 : Delicacy
- 2017 : Jalouse
- 2018 : I Feel Better
- 2019 : The Mystery of Henri Pick
- 2020 : Fantasies

== Bibliography ==
- Inversion de l'idiotie : de l'influence de deux Polonais (2001)
- Entre les oreilles (2002)
- Erotic Potential of My Wife (Le Potentiel érotique de ma femme) (2004)
- En cas de bonheur (2005)
- Les Cœurs autonomes (2006)
- Qui se souvient de David Foenkinos ? (2007)
- Nos séparations (2008)
- Delicacy (La délicatesse) (2009)
- Bernard (2010)
- Lennon (2010)
- Les Souvenirs (2011)
- Le Petit garçon qui disait toujours non (2011)
- Je vais mieux (2012)
- Charlotte (2014)
- Le Mystère Henri Pick (2016)
- Vers la beauté (2018)
- Deux sœurs (2019)
- La Famille Martin (2020)
- Numéro deux (2022)
- La Vie heureuse (2024)
- Tout le monde aime Clara (2025)
