= Jalouse (film) =

- Theatrical release poster
- Directed by: David Foenkinos; Stéphane Foenkinos
- Screenplay by: David Foenkinos; Stéphane Foenkinos
- Produced by: Éric and Nicolas Altmayer
- Starring: Karin Viard
- Cinematography: Guillaume Deffontaines
- Edited by: Virginie Bruant
- Music by: Paul-Marie Barbier; Julien Grunberg
- Production companies: Mandarin Films; StudioCanal
- Distributed by: StudioCanal
- Release date: 8 November 2017
- Running time: 102 minutes
- Country: France
- Language: French
- Box office: $6.5 million

Jalouse is a 2017 French comedy film directed by David and Stéphane Foenkinos.

== Plot ==
Almost overnight, Nathalie Pêcheux, a divorced French teacher, changes from a loving mother into a jealous monster. Her first target is her stunning 18-year-old daughter Mathilde, a ballet dancer, but her field of attack soon extends to her friends, colleagues, and even her neighbours. After the success of their film Delicacy, author and screenwriter David Foenkinos pairs up again with his brother Stéphane Foenkinos to portray a woman's radical and unexpected shift of character that oscillates between black comedy and psychological thriller.

== Cast ==
- Karin Viard – Nathalie Pécheux
- Dara Tombroff – Mathilde Pécheux
- Anne Dorval – Sophie
- Thibault de Montalembert – Jean-Pierre
- Bruno Todeschini – Sébastien Corti
- Marie-Julie Baup – Isabelle
- Corentin Fila – Félix
- Anaïs Demoustier – Mélanie Pick
- Xavier De Guillebon – Thierry
- Eva Lallier – Emma
- Thérèse Roussel – Monique Mougins
- Sreypeich Bensimon – Lin
