= Irma Vep =

1996 film by Olivier Assayas

- Theatrical release poster
- Directed by: Olivier Assayas
- Written by: Olivier Assayas
- Produced by: Georges Benayoun
- Starring: Maggie Cheung; Jean-Pierre Léaud; Nathalie Richard; Bulle Ogier; Lou Castel; Arsinée Khanjian; Antoine Basler; Nathalie Boutefeu; Alex Descas; Dominique Faysse; Bernard Nissile; Olivier Torres
- Cinematography: Éric Gautier
- Edited by: Luc Barnier
- Music by: Philippe Richard
- Production company: Dacia Films
- Distributed by: Haut et Court
- Release dates: 15 May 1996 (Cannes); 13 November 1996 (France)
- Running time: 97 minutes
- Country: France
- Languages: English; French
- Budget: €1.4 million
- Box office: $315,015

Irma Vep is a 1996 French comedy-drama film written and directed by Olivier Assayas. Hong Kong actress Maggie Cheung plays a fictionalised version of herself, as disasters result when an unstable French film director (played by Jean-Pierre Léaud) attempts to remake Louis Feuillade's classic silent film serial Les Vampires (1915–16. Irma Vep, (an anagram for the word "vampire") is a meditation on the state of the French film industry through the eyes of the fictionalized Maggie Cheung.

Irma Vep was screened in the Un Certain Regard section of the 1996 Cannes Film Festival. It was released in France on 13 November 1996.

In 2022, the film was reimagined as a miniseries for HBO, created by Assayas.

== Plot ==
In an attempt to revitalise his career, washed-up film director René Vidal resolves to remake Louis Feuillade's silent film serial Les Vampires. Maggie Cheung has been cast to play the film's heroine, Irma Vep, a burglar and a spy, who dresses in a tight, black, latex rubber catsuit. Irma Vep, it is explained, is an anagram for vampire, but she is not a literal vampire. Rather, she is the inspiration for a criminal gang named The Vampires, as in the original serial.

René, the cast and crew view the film's dailies and he angrily declares the footage terrible and soulless. After he storms out, everyone else quickly departs the facility, leaving Maggie stranded. She accepts an invitation from the costume designer, Zoé, to a group dinner with other crew members. There, Zoé confides to another woman that she is romantically interested in Maggie, which the woman then tells Maggie, embarrassing her.

After the dinner with the other crew members, Maggie visits René at a hotel in the aftermath of a violent fight with his wife. René admits that he had mainly wanted to make the film because he desired to see her in it. Later that evening, Maggie, apparently possessed by her character, dons the catsuit and steals jewelry from the hotel suite of a nude American woman, who is arguing on the phone with her boyfriend. She then flees to the rooftop and drops the jewelry off the building.

The next morning, Zoé picks an exhausted Maggie up from her hotel room. René has gone missing, and the crew attempt to film without him. At the end of the day, imperious film director José Mirano meets Maggie's co-star Laure at a bar and tells her that René has had a nervous breakdown and that he has been hired to complete the film. He firmly contends that a Chinese actress should not be playing Irma Vep, whom he sees as an icon within French culture. José tells her he intends to replace Maggie with Laure.

Zoé and Maggie take a taxi to a rave, but Maggie declines to go at the last minute and departs in the taxi. Zoé, looking disappointed, walks through the crowd at the rave.

José and the cast and crew gather at the screening facility to view the dailies that René has personally edited. Maggie is not there, however, and it is said that she has left for the United States to work on a film with Ridley Scott. The dailies have been cut into a hallucinatory montage with numerous scratches and other modifications being done to the film itself. The future of the production is not revealed.

== Cast ==
- Maggie Cheung as herself
- Jean-Pierre Léaud as René Vidal
- Nathalie Richard as Zoé
- Antoine Basler as journalist
- Nathalie Boutefeu as Laure
- Alex Descas as Desormeaux
- Dominique Faysse as Maïté
- Arsinée Khanjian as American woman
- Bernard Nissile as Markus
- Olivier Torres as Ferdinand / Moreno
- Bulle Ogier as Mireille
- Lou Castel as José Mirano
- Jacques Fieschi as Roland
- Balthazar Clémenti as Robert, assistant
- Jessica Doyle as Jessica, Roland's friend

== Allusions to French film history ==
The film refers to iconic figures in French film history: Louis Feuillade, Musidora, Arletty, François Truffaut, the Groupe SLON, Alain Delon, and Catherine Deneuve. Thematically, the film questions the place of French cinema at the time. According to Chris Darke, it is not a "mourning for cinema with the romantic nostalgia" but "more like the Mexican Day of the Dead: remembrance as an act of celebration". Furthermore, Dale Hudson of Screen wrote, "It is less a film about re-presenting the past, than it is a film about addressing the present, specifically the place of France within the global economy."

== Production ==
The idea for the film was born out of an attempted collaboration among Assayas, Claire Denis, and Atom Egoyan, who wanted to experiment with the situation of a foreigner in Paris. In the 1915 original serial, written and directed by Louis Feuillade, Irma Vep was played by French silent film actress Musidora (1889–1957). Much of the film depicts set-related incidents that echo scenes in Truffaut's 1973 film Day for Night, to which Irma Vep owes a large thematic debt.

However, Assayas publicly stated that although he considers Day for Night a great film, it is more about the fantasy of filmmaking than the reality. Assayas credits as a greater inspiration Rainer Werner Fassbinder's Beware of a Holy Whore (1971), in which Lou Castel, who plays the replacement director José Mirano in this film, plays a film director.

Assayas wrote the script in ten weeks, and the film was shot in a month, with no retakes. "Its hasty production circumstances seem perilously close to the ones that cause everyone such grief in the film."

Assayas married Cheung in 1998. They divorced in 2001. They again collaborated in 2004 on the film Clean.

== Reception ==
Irma Vep received a positive critical response. On the review aggregator website Rotten Tomatoes, the film holds an approval rating of 94% based on 49 reviews, with an average rating of 7.7/10. The website's critics consensus reads, "Starring a bewitching Maggie Cheung, Irma Vep is an evocative and reflexive satire of the filmmaking process that is bursting at the seams with an affection for cinema." Metacritic, which uses a weighted average, assigned the film a score of 80 out of 100, based on 21 critics, indicating "generally favorable" reviews.

== References in other media ==
Lettrist footage from the film, along with shots from the original Les Vampires, are used in White Ring's video for their single "IxC999".

A character in the five-comic series "Anno Dracula – 1895: Seven Days in Mayhem" by Kim Newman and Paul McCaffrey is based on Irma Vep.

== Home media ==
Irma Vep was released on Blu-ray and DVD through The Criterion Collection on 27 April 2021.

== Television adaptation ==
HBO produced a limited television series adaptation of the film that premiered at the Cannes Film Festival on 22 May 2022, and was released on 6 June 2022 on HBO. It stars Alicia Vikander, Vincent Macaigne, Adria Arjona, Byron Bowers, Devon Ross, Carrie Brownstein, Tom Sturridge and Fala Chen and was written and directed by Assayas.

== See also ==
- The Mystery of Irma Vep, a 1984 play for two characters by Charles Ludlam
- Lettrism, inspiration for some sequences of the film
