= Three Adventures of Brooke =

2018 film

- Directed by: Yuan Qing
- Screenplay by: Yuan Qing
- Starring: Fangyi Xu; Pascal Greggory
- Cinematography: Zhu Jingjing
- Edited by: Yuan Qing
- Music by: Howie B Andrew Lok
- Release date: 2018
- Language: Chinese

Three Adventures of Brooke (Chinese: 星溪的三次奇遇, romanized: Xīngxī de sān cì qí yù) is a 2018 drama film written and directed by Yuan Qing, in her feature film debut.

A co-production between China and Malaysia, the film premiered at the Giornate degli Autori section of the 75th Venice International Film Festival. It was also screened at the Pingyao International Film Festival, the Singapore International Film Festival and at the Three Continents Festival.

== Cast ==
- Fangyi Xu as Brooke
- Pascal Greggory as Pierre
- Ribbon Ooi as Ailing
- Kam Kia Kee as Fong
- Allan Toh Wei Lun as Chi Tong
- Lim Yi Xin as Captain
