= The Wounded Man (film) =

- Directed by: Patrice Chéreau
- Written by: Patrice Chéreau; Hervé Guibert
- Produced by: Claude Berri; Marie-Laure Reyre; Ariel Zeitoun
- Starring: Jean-Hugues Anglade; Vittorio Mezzogiorno
- Cinematography: Renato Berta
- Edited by: Denise de Casabianca
- Music by: Fiorenzo Carpi
- Distributed by: Gaumont Distribution
- Release date: 25 May 1983
- Running time: 109 minutes
- Country: France
- Language: French
- Budget: $2.3 million

The Wounded Man (French: L'Homme blessé) is a 1983 French erotic drama film directed by Patrice Chéreau, and written by him and Hervé Guibert. It stars Jean-Hugues Anglade and Vittorio Mezzogiorno. It won the César Award for Best Original Screenplay, and was entered in the 1983 Cannes Film Festival.

The film was initially inspired by Jean Genet's autobiographical novel The Thief's Journal, but kept only the basic idea of a gay relationship with an age gap.

== Synopsis ==
Henri, a young and timid gay man, lives with his parents in their cramped flat. He hangs around the train station, a popular cruising ground. He meets Jean, a rough trade hustler about a decade older, and becomes fascinated with him.

== Cast ==
- Jean-Hugues Anglade - Henri
- Vittorio Mezzogiorno (Note: Dubbed into French by Gérard Depardieu.) - Jean Lerman
- Roland Bertin - Bosmans
- Lisa Kreuzer - Elisabeth
- Claude Berri - Client
- Armin Mueller-Stahl - Henri's father
- Annick Alane - Henri's mother
- Sophie Edmond - Henri's sister
- Hammou Graïa - Man at the station
- Gérard Desarthe - Crying man
- Denis Lavant
- Maria Verdi
- Suzanne Chavance
- Roland Chalosse
- Eddy Roos
- Charly Chemouny
