= Gabrielle (2005 film) =

2005 film directed by Patrice Chéreau

- Promotional movie poster
- Directed by: Patrice Chéreau
- Screenplay by: Patrice Chéreau; Anne-Louise Trividic
- Based on: The Return by Joseph Conrad
- Produced by: Joseph Strub; Serge Catoire; Ferdinanda Frangipane
- Starring: Isabelle Huppert; Pascal Greggory; Claudia Coli
- Cinematography: Éric Gautier
- Music by: Fabio Vacchi
- Distributed by: Mars Distribution
- Release date: 28 September 2005
- Running time: 90 minutes
- Country: France
- Language: French
- Box office: $2,775,311

Gabrielle is a 2005 French film directed by Patrice Chéreau. It is a screen adaptation of Joseph Conrad's short story The Return.

== Plot ==
Jean Harvey and his wife Gabrielle are renowned within Paris's haute bourgeoisie for the salons they host each Thursday evening.

Jean and Gabrielle live a comfortable yet regimented life in a well-appointed Paris mansion, assisted by a retinue of devoted servants. Yet their marriage is more of a contract than a relationship. Jean confides to the audience that he loves Gabrielle "as a collector loves his most prized object."

On their 10th anniversary, Jean comes home to find a note from Gabrielle in which she writes that within the hour she will have left to meet her lover.

Jean spends several minutes digesting the meaning of the note. Gabrielle returns shortly, though, and Jean and Gabrielle reflect on their marriage for the remainder of the film.

== Notes ==
Gabrielle opened in the United States on 14 July 2006 at the Lincoln Plaza Cinemas and the IFC Center in Manhattan. It was also available that weekend to many home cable subscribers throughout the U.S. via video on demand through IFC. Subsequent release dates were July 28, 2006 in Boston and 4 August 2006 in Los Angeles.

== Cast ==
- Isabelle Huppert as Gabrielle Hervey
- Pascal Greggory as Jean Hervey
- Claudia Coli as Yvonne, Gabrielle's maid
- Chantal Neuwirth as Madeleine
- Thierry Hancisse as Editor in Chief of Jean's financial publication
- Jeanne Herry as The maid
- Raina Kabaivanska as a singer and pianist

== Reception ==
On review aggregator Rotten Tomatoes, Gabrielle holds an approval rating of 74%, based on 54 reviews, and an average rating of 6.7/10. Its consensus reads, "Patrice Chéreau's exquisite rendering of Joseph Conrad's The Return brings underlying passions to surface in a long-suffering marriage". On Metacritic, the film has a weighted average score of 79 out of 100, based on 20 critics, indicating "Generally favorable reviews". Gabrielle was placed at 89 on Slant Magazine's best films of the 2000s.

== Accolades ==
- 2006 César Awards
  - Won: Best Costume Design (Caroline de Vivaise)
  - Won: Best Production Design (Olivier Radot)
  - Nominated: Best Actress – Leading Role (Isabelle Huppert)
  - Nominated: Best Cinematography (Eric Gautier)
  - Nominated: Best Sound (Olivier Dô Hùu, Benoît Hillebrant and Guillaume Sciama)
  - Nominated: Best Adaptation (Patrice Chéreau and Anne-Louise Trividic)
- 2005 Venice Film Festival
  - Nominated: Golden Lion (Patrice Chéreau)
