= Son frère (film) =

His Brother (Son frère)
- Theatrical release poster
- Directed by: Patrice Chéreau
- Produced by: Pierre Chevalier (producer); Joseph Strub (exec. producer)
- Starring: Bruno Todeschini; Eric Caravaca; Nathalie Boutefeu
- Cinematography: Eric Gautier
- Edited by: François Gédigier
- Music by: Marianne Faithfull; Franc McGuiness; Angelo Badalamenti
- Distributed by: Pyramide Distribution
- Release date: 2003
- Running time: 87 minutes
- Country: France
- Language: French
- Box office: $316.000

Son frère (English: His Brother) is a 2003 French film directed by Patrice Chéreau. It was based on the 2001 Philippe Besson novel Son frère (His Brother). The screenplay was written by Chéreau and Anne-Louise Trividic.

== Synopsis ==
Brothers Thomas (Bruno Todeschini) and Luc (Eric Caravaca) have an estranged relationship. One day, Thomas comes to Luc's apartment explaining that he is ill and asks if Luc will accompany him to the hospital. Thomas has an undetermined platelet disorder which is treated with cortisone and splenectomy—neither help. Luc, who is gay, and is in a relationship with Vincent (Sylvain Jacques), is viewed by their father as the stronger of the two and wishes it was Luc that were ill, as he could beat the illness.

Thomas's girlfriend, Claire (Nathalie Boutefeu), leaves Thomas when she realizes he only wants his brother Luc around. Luc's relationship with Vincent is also strained as Luc takes Thomas to the family home in Brittany. The film jumps forward in time to allow about 18 months to be covered during the course of the film. By the end of the film, the brothers reconcile.

== Cast ==
- Bruno Todeschini as Thomas
- Eric Caravaca as Luc
- Nathalie Boutefeu as Claire
- Sylvain Jacques as Vincent
- Maurice Garrel as the old man
- Catherine Ferran as Head Doctor
- Antoinette Moya as the mother
- Fred Ulysse as the father
- Robinson Stévenin as Manuel

== Awards and nominations ==
- Berlin Film Festival (Germany)
  - Won: Silver Bear - Best Director (Patrice Chéreau)
  - Nominated: Golden Bear (Patrice Chéreau)
- César Awards (France)
  - Nominated: Best Actor – Leading Role (Bruno Todeschini)
- European Film Awards
  - Nominated: Best Actor – Leading Role (Bruno Todeschini)
- Lumiere Awards (France)
  - Won: Best Actor – Leading Role (Bruno Todeschini)
