= Kerry Fox =

New Zealand actress (born 1966)

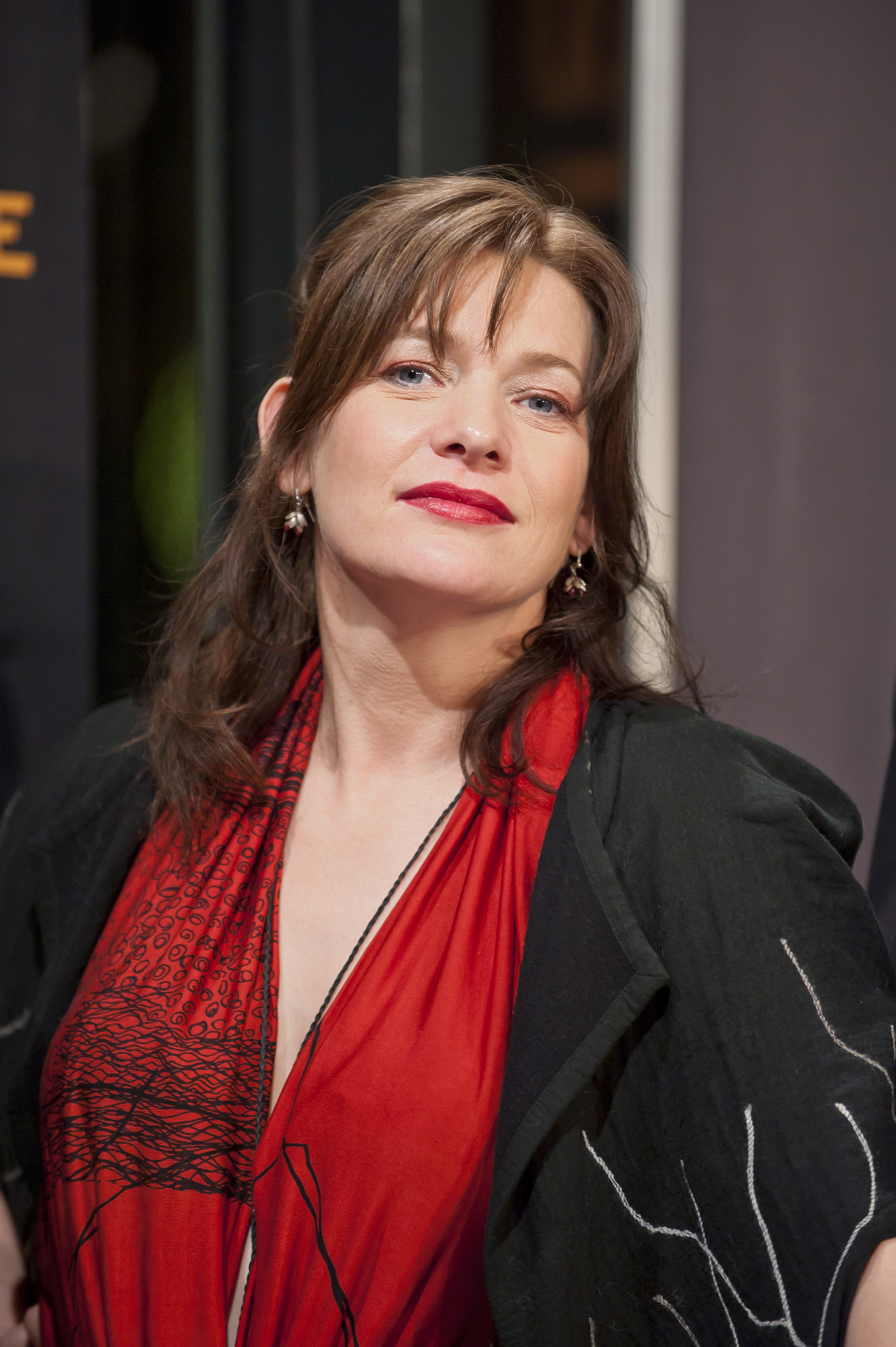
- Fox at the 59th Berlin International Film Festival in 2009
- Born: Kerry Lauren Fox; 30 July 1966 (age 60); Lower Hutt, Wellington, New Zealand
- Occupation: Actress
- Years active: 1989–present
- Spouse: Alexander Linklater
- Children: 2

Kerry Lauren Fox (born 30 July 1966) is a New Zealand actress. She came to prominence playing author Janet Frame in the movie An Angel at My Table directed by Jane Campion, which gained her a Best Actress Award from the New Zealand Film and Television Awards.

== Early life ==
Fox was born in Lower Hutt, Wellington. She graduated from Toi Whakaari: New Zealand Drama School in 1987 with a Diploma in Acting.

== Career ==
Fox has had an international career, working in independent films and on television. She received praise and a nomination for the Australian Film Institute Awards for her leading role in Country Life, starred in Danny Boyle's breakout British hit Shallow Grave, and was nominated for the Canadian Genie Award for her supporting role in The Hanging Garden.

For her role as Claire in Intimacy (2001), directed by Patrice Chéreau, she won the Silver Bear for Best Actress at the Berlin Film Festival. In this film she performed unsimulated fellatio. Her husband, Alexander Linklater, wrote about the experience of watching her perform this act on another man.

In 2009 she appeared alongside John Simm, Lucy Cohu and Ian Hart in the Duke of York's Theatre production of Andrew Bovell's play Speaking in Tongues. In 2011 she played Oriel Lamb in the television adaptation of Tim Winton's novel Cloudstreet.

Fox starred as criminal matriarch Frankie in the ABC series Bay Of Fires for two seasons between 2023 - 2025.

== Personal life ==
Fox is married to journalist Alexander Linklater. They have two sons.

== Filmography ==
=== Film ===
Year	Title	Role	Notes
1990	An Angel at My Table	Janet Frame	
1992	The Last Days of Chez Nous	Vicki	
1993	Friends	Sophie Gordon	
1994	The Last Tattoo	Kelly Towne	
1994	Country Life	Sally Voysey	
1994	A Village Affair	Clodagh Unwin	
1994	Shallow Grave	Juliet Miller	
1995	Saigon Baby	Kate Cooper	
1995	The Affair	Maggie Leyland	
1997	Welcome to Sarajevo	Jane Carson	
1997	The Hanging Garden	Rosemary	
1998	The Sound of One Hand Clapping	Sonja Buloh	
1998	The Wisdom of Crocodiles	Maria Vaughan	a.k.a. Immortality
1999	To Walk with Lions	Lucy Jackson	
1999	The Darkest Light	Sue	
1999	Thinking About Sleep	Police Woman	Short film
1999	Fanny and Elvis	Katherine Fanny 'Kate' Dickson	
2001	Intimacy	Claire	
2001	The Point Men	Maddy Hope	
2002	Black and White	Helen Devaney	
2003	The Gathering	Marion Kirkman	
2003	So Close to Home	Maggie	
2004	Niceland (Population. 1.000.002)	Mary	
2004	Bob the Builder: Snowed Under	Charlene (voice)	Direct-to-video
2005	Rag Tale	Peach James Taylor	
2007	The Ferryman	Suze	
2007	Intervention	Kate	
2007	He Said	Julie	Short film
2008	Inconceivable	Kay Stephenson	
2009	Storm	Hannah Maynard	
2009	Bright Star	Mrs. Brawne	
2010	Morning Echo	Christine Moffatt	Short film
2011	Burning Man	Sally	
2011	Intruders	Dr. Rachel	
2012	Mental	Nancy	
2012	Mr. Pip	June Watts	
2013	Trap for Cinderella	Julia	
2014	Patrick's Day	Maura Fitzgerald	
2014	War Book	Maria	
2015	Holding the Man	Mary Gert Conigrave	
2015	Downriver	Paige Levy	
2015	The Dressmaker	Beulah Harridiene	
2016	The Rehearsal	Hannah	
2017	Mayhem	Irene Smythe	
2019	Top End Wedding	Hampton	
2019	Little Joe	Bella	
2019	Rare Beasts	Marion	
2021	The Colour Room	Ann Cliff	

=== Television ===
Year	Title	Role	Notes
1989	Night of the Red Hunter	Police Officer	TV series
1993	Rocky Star	Dianna Moore	TV series
1993	Mr. Wroe's Virgins	Hannah	TV miniseries
1993	The Rainbow Warrior	Andrea Joyce	TV film
1995	A Village Affair	Clodagh Unwin	TV film
1995	The Affair	Maggie Leyland	TV film
1996	Tales from the Crypt	Dolores	"Last Respects"
1999	Shockers: Deja Vu	Jessica	TV film
2003	40	Maggie	TV miniseries
2004	Waking the Dead	Elsbeth Varley	"Anger Management: Part 1"
2005	The Murder Room	Muriel Godby	TV miniseries
2005	Footprints in the Snow	Claire	TV film
2005	Cold Blood	Jan	TV film
2006	Nostradamus	Catherine de' Medici	TV film
2007	The Whistleblowers	Polly Lewington	"Pandemic"
2008	Trial & Retribution	DI Moyra Lynch	"The Box: Part 1"
2008	The Shooting of Thomas Hurndall	Jocelyn Hurndall	TV film
2011	Vera	Patricia Carmichael	"Little Lazarus"
2011	Cloudstreet	Oriel Lamb	TV miniseries
2012	Midsomer Murders	Betty DeQuetteville	"The Dark Rider"
2012	New Tricks	Jane Ross	"Part of a Whole"
2012	Falcón	Manuela Falcón	"The Blind Man of Seville", "The Silent and the Damned"
2013–2015	Sex & Violence	Brenda Shaw	Recurring role
2014	The Crimson Field	Sister Margaret Quayle	TV miniseries
2014	Glue	Jackie Warwick	TV miniseries
2016	National Treasure	Zoe Darwin	TV miniseries
2017	Death in Paradise	Linda Taylor	Series 6 Episode 3 The Impossible Murder
2018	The Split	Judge Joyce Aspen	TV miniseries
2018	Medusa's Ankles	Susannah	Short TV film
2020	Last Tango in Halifax	Nadine	TV series
2022	Conversations with Friends	Valerie Taylor-Gates	TV miniseries; 2 episodes
2023	Bay of Fires	Frankie McLeish	TV series
2025	The Stolen Girl	Deborah Stanton	TV miniseries; 2 episodes
