= Nathalie Boutefeu =

French actress, film director and screenwriter

- Born: 1968 (age 57–58); Dijon, France
- Occupations: Actress, film director, screenwriter
- Years active: 1990–present

Nathalie Boutefeu (born 1968) is a French actress, film director and screenwriter. She has appeared in 40 films since 1990. She starred in the film The Butterfly's Dream, which was screened in the Un Certain Regard section at the 1994 Cannes Film Festival.

== Selected filmography ==
- The Butterfly's Dream (1994)
- Irma Vep (1996)
- Port Djema (1997)
- Sachs' Disease (1999)
- Pau and His Brother (2001)
- Savage Souls (2001)
- A+ Pollux (2002)
- His Brother (2003)
- Kings and Queen (2004)
- A Secret (2007)
- Loving Without Reason (2012)
- Candice Renoir (2015)
- A Couple (2022)
