= Courcelles-sur-Viosne =

- Commune
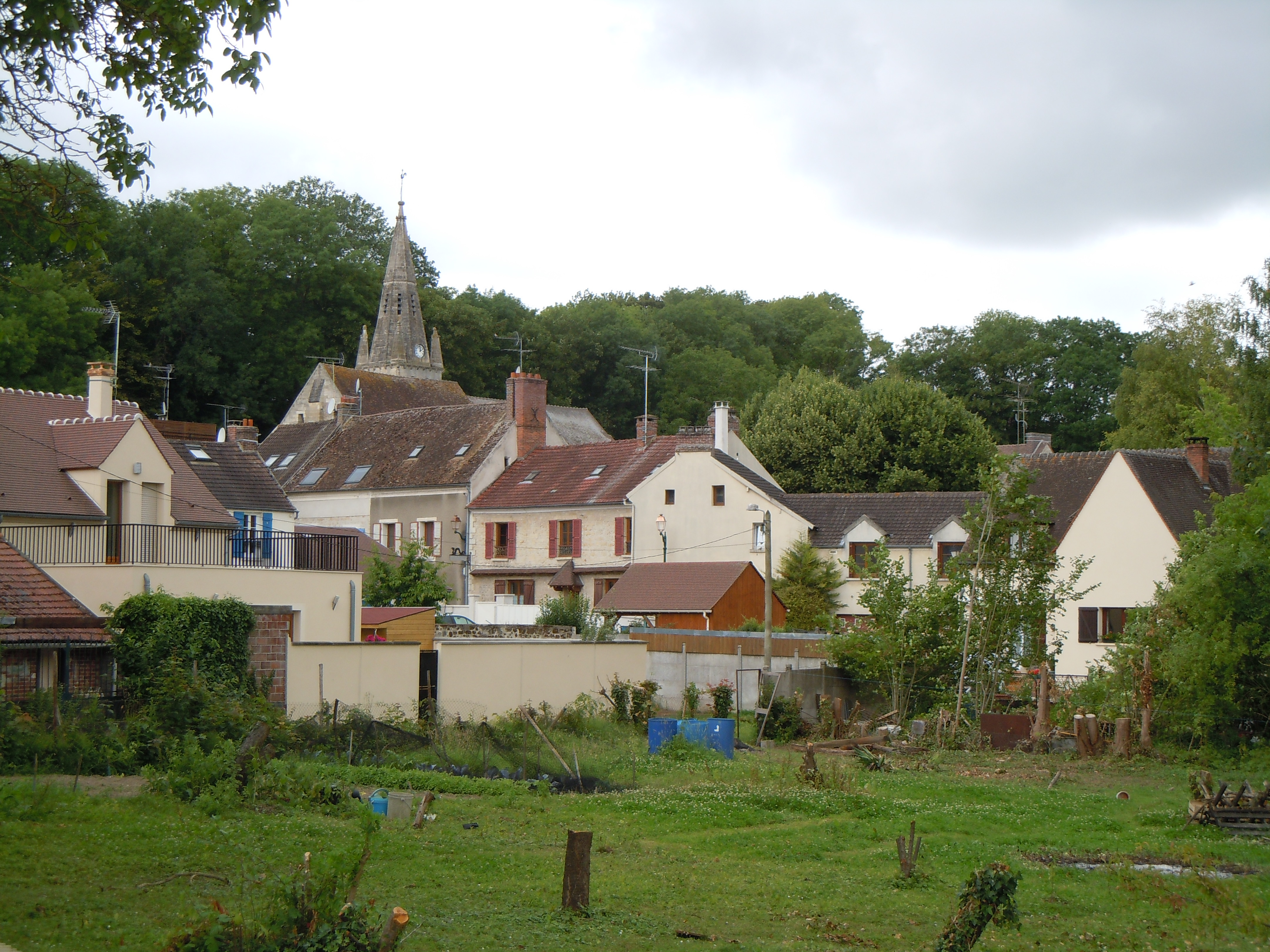
- A general view of Courcelles-sur-Viosne

- Coat of arms
- Location of Courcelles-sur-Viosne
- Location within France Location within Île-de-France (region)
- Coordinates: 49°04′43″N 2°00′08″E
- Country: France
- Region: Île-de-France
- Department: Val-d'Oise
- Arrondissement: Pontoise
- Canton: Pontoise
- Intercommunality: CC Vexin Centre

Government
  - Mayor (2020–2026): Christophe Roche
- Area^{1}: 3.61 km^{2} (1.39 sq mi)
- Highest elevation: 108 m (354 ft)
- Lowest elevation: 42 m (138 ft)
- Population (2023): 310
  - Density: 86/km^{2} (220/sq mi)
- Demonym: Courcellois
- Time zone: UTC+01:00 (CET)
  - Summer (DST): UTC+02:00 (CEST)
- INSEE/Postal code: 95181 /95650
- Website: www.courcelles-sur-viosne.fr
- ^{1} French Land Register data, which excludes lakes, ponds, glaciers > 1 km^{2} (0.386 sq mi or 247 acres) and river estuaries.

Courcelles-sur-Viosne (French pronunciation: [kuʁsɛl syʁ vjɔn]; lit. 'Courcelles-on-Viosne') is a rural commune in the Val-d'Oise department in Île-de-France in northern France.

== Transport ==
Courcelles-sur-Viosne lends its name to Montgeroult–Courcelles station on the Saint-Denis–Dieppe railway in the neighbouring commune of Montgeroult.

== See also ==
- Communes of the Val-d'Oise department
