= Michka Assayas =

French journalist, writer and screenwriter (born 1958)

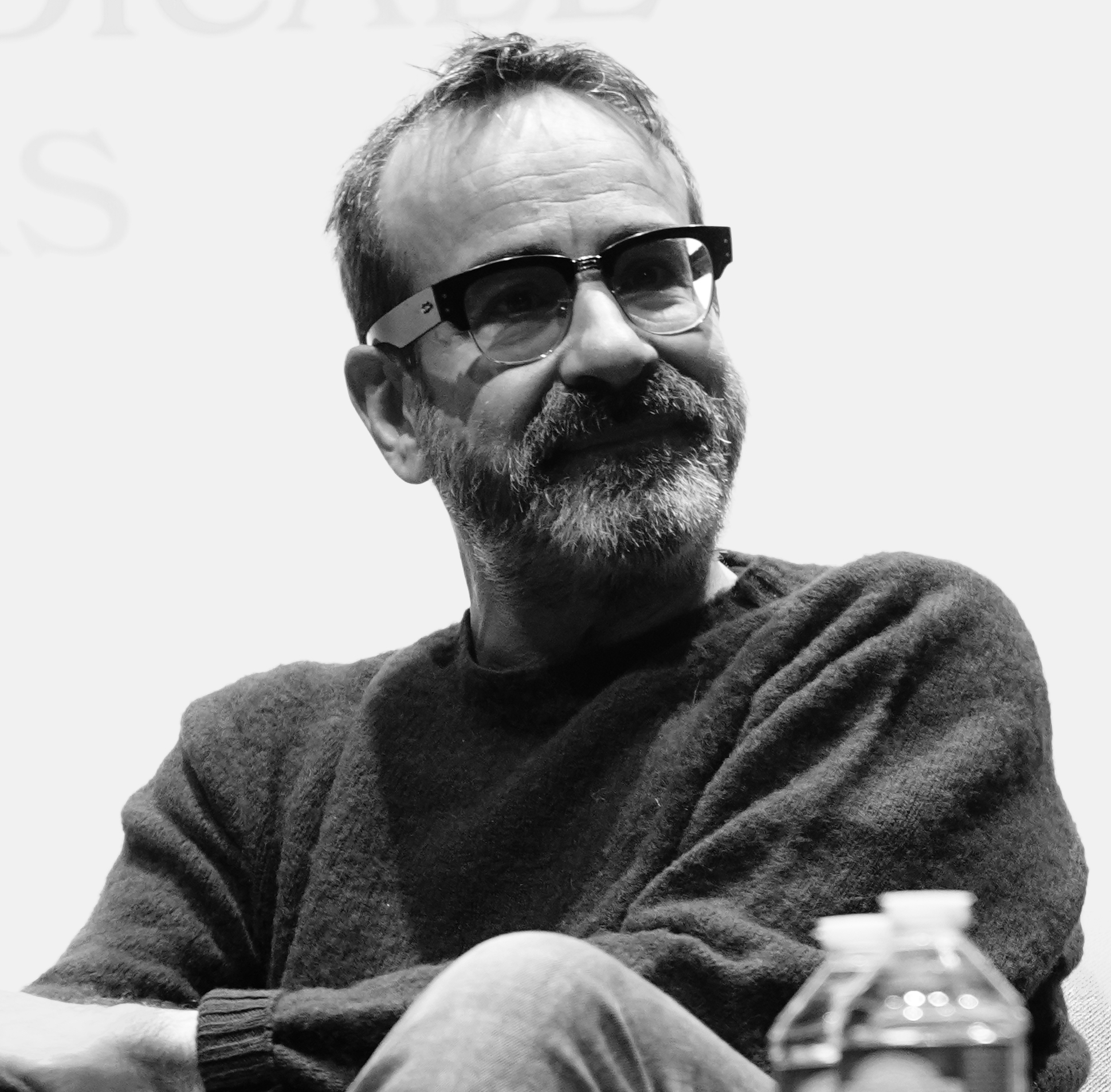
- Michka Assayas in 2024
- Born: 2 November 1958 (age 67); France
- Education: Ecole Normale Superieure de Fontenay-Saint-Cloud
- Occupations: Author and music journalist
- Writing career
- Language: English and French

Michka Assayas (born 2 November 1958 in Paris) is a French author, music journalist and radio presenter. In France, he is known for his rock reviews and the Dictionnaire du rock published in 2000 and his radio show on radio France Inter.

For his novel Exhibition, which also appeared in a German translation, he received the Prix Découverte Figaro Magazine Fouquet's in 2002 and the Prix des Deux Magots in 2003. The novel is a tribute to the rock and punk of the 1970s and 1980s. Additionally, Assayas wrote Bono On Bono: Conversations With Michka Assayas in 2005. It is an intimate look at Grammy Award winning Paul David Hewson, better known as Bono, lead vocalist of the Irish rock band U2.

== Early life ==
Michka Assayas was born in France on 2 November 1958. He is the son of Raymond Assayas, otherwise known as Jacques Rémy, a screenwriter/writer of Turkish-Jewish origin and Catherine de Karolyi, a Hungarian fashion designer. He is the brother of French film director and screenwriter Olivier Assayas.

== Education and writing career ==
A former student of the Ecole Normale Superieure de Fontenay-Saint-Cloud, he worked in the early 80's for Rock & Folk where he ardently defended some post-punk bands like Joy Division in 1981, and New Order in 1983.

Assayas also worked for Libération. He was also a columnist in the first version of the magazine Les Inrockuptibles and has written for VSD, 7 à Paris, Actuel, and Le Monde de la musique. He was the prime contractor for the "Dictionnaire du rock" (3 volumes, 2650 pages) which was published in 2000 by Éditions Robert Laffont, and was a columnist time in issuing Bernard Lenoir on France Inter.

He is a longtime friend of the singer Bono of U2, whom he first met him in 1980 while working as a music reporter for the magazine Le Monde de la musique. Assayas finally convinced him to write a book of interviews. The final result, Bono on Bono: In Conversations with Michka Assayas, was published in 2005.

From September 2008 to June 2012, he hosted a weekly show on Sunday at 22 pm on the history of rock, 21 Subjective on France Musique.

=== Novels ===
- Empty years (1990)
- In her skin (1994)
- Exhibition, Prix des Deux Magots (2002)
- Solo (2009)
- Without identity (2011)

=== Chronicles ===
- Backfire (1991)

=== About rock ===
- The Beatles and the Sixties (W5 Series) (with Claudius) (1997)
- Dictionary of rock (as editor) (2000)
- Bono on Bono: Conversations with Michka Assayas (2005)
- John Lennon: Unfinished Music (with Claude Chastagner, Emma Lavigne and Grazia Caroni) (2005)
- New Wave, Photo-Journal from 1977 to 1983 (with Pierre René Worms) (2009)

=== Screenplays ===
- Sushi Sushi movie by Laurent Perrin (1991)
- Sam enough movie by Virginia Thevenet (1992)

=== Prefaces ===
- Fire in the life of Jean-René Huguenin (1987)
- Syd Barrett: The lost genius of Pink Floyd Tim Willis (2004)
- 1001 albums that must be listened to in his life: Rock, Hip Hop, Soul, Dance, World Music, Pop, Techno (2006)
