= Jacques Rémy (writer) =

French film director and screenwriter (1911–1981)

- Born: Rémy Assayas; 21 June 1911; Constantinople, Ottoman Empire
- Died: 1 December 1981 (aged 70); Paris, France
- Other name: Raymond Assayas
- Occupation: Screenwriter
- Years active: 1947–1981
- Children: Olivier Assayas and Michka Assayas

Jacques Rémy (21 June 1911 – 1 December 1981) is the pen name of Rémy Assayas or Raymond Assayas, a Turkish-born French screenwriter.

Rémy was the father of film director and critic Olivier Assayas and writer Michka Assayas.

== Selected filmography ==
- Le moulin des Andes (also: Le fruit mordu) (1945)
- The Damned (1947)
- The Secret of Mayerling (1949)
- The Fighting Men (1950)
- The Big Meeting (1950)
- Paris Vice Squad (1951)
- Passion (1951)
- Paris Is Always Paris (1951)
- Matrimonial Agency (1952)
- The House on the Dune (1952)
- Cavallina storna (1953)
- Passionate Song (1953)
- Follow That Man (1953)
- Beatrice Cenci (1956)
- If All the Guys in the World (1956)
- Engaged to Death (1957)
- The Night Heaven Fell (1958)
- The Cat (1958)
- The Cat Shows Her Claws (1960)
- Between Love and Duty (1960)
- All the Gold in the World (1961)
- Casablanca, Nest of Spies (1963)
- The Dirty Game (1965)

== Bibliography ==
- Dayna Oscherwitz & MaryEllen Higgins. The A to Z of French Cinema. Scarecrow Press, 2009.
