= Montgeroult =

- Commune
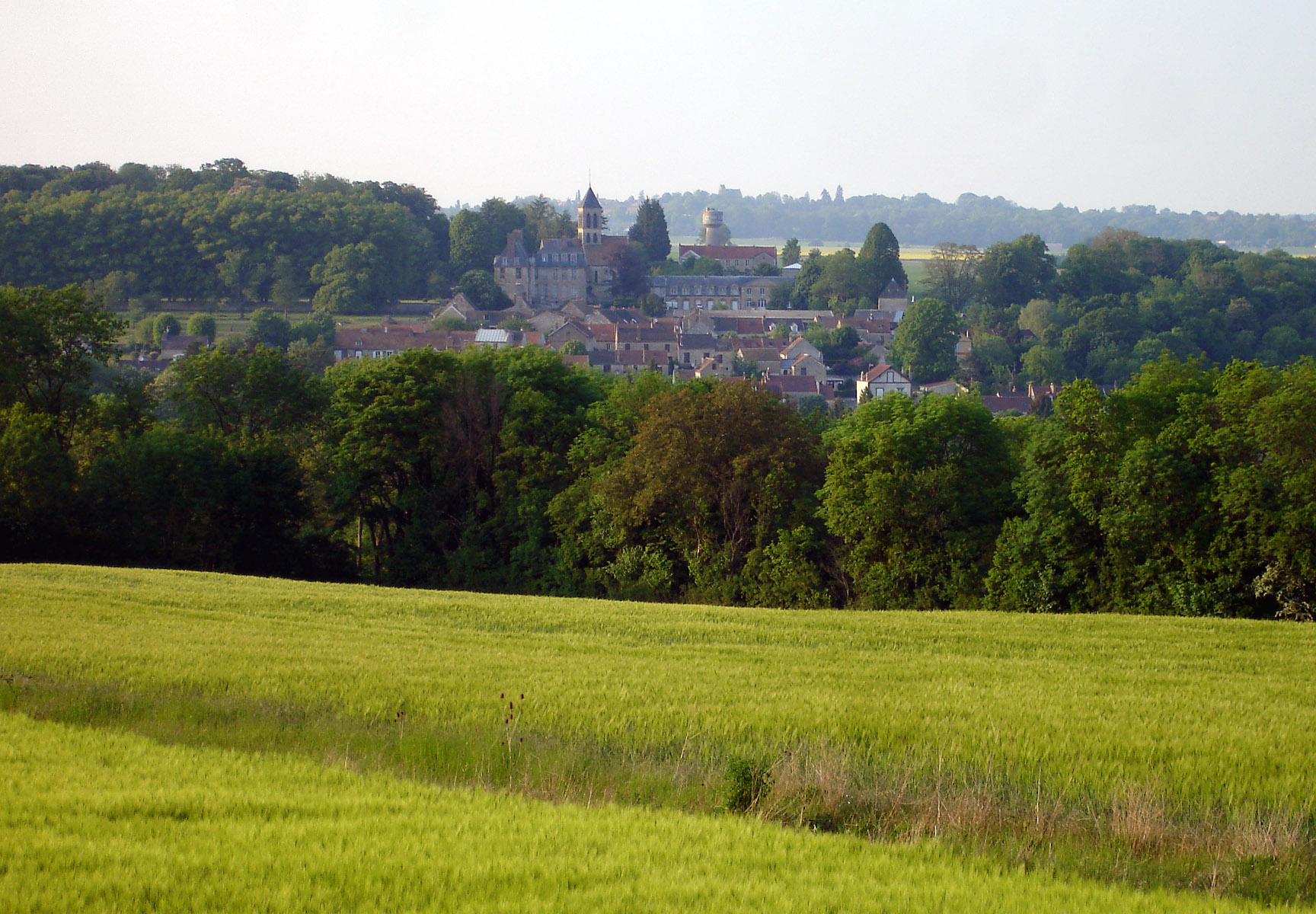
- A view of the village from the Chaussée Jules César, in Courcelles-sur-Viosne

- Coat of arms
- Location of Montgeroult
- Location within France Location within Île-de-France (region)
- Coordinates: 49°04′58″N 2°00′17″E
- Country: France
- Region: Île-de-France
- Department: Val-d'Oise
- Arrondissement: Pontoise
- Canton: Pontoise

Government
  - Mayor (2020–2026): Alain Mateos
- Area^{1}: 4.97 km^{2} (1.92 sq mi)
- Highest elevation: 101 m (331 ft)
- Lowest elevation: 40 m (130 ft)
- Population (2023): 361
  - Density: 72.6/km^{2} (188/sq mi)
- Time zone: UTC+01:00 (CET)
  - Summer (DST): UTC+02:00 (CEST)
- INSEE/Postal code: 95422 /95650
- ^{1} French Land Register data, which excludes lakes, ponds, glaciers > 1 km^{2} (0.386 sq mi or 247 acres) and river estuaries.

Montgeroult (French pronunciation: [mɔ̃ʒ(ə)ʁu]) is a commune in the Val-d'Oise department in Île-de-France in northern France.

== See also ==
- Communes of the Val-d'Oise department
