= Patrice Chéreau =

French opera and theatre director

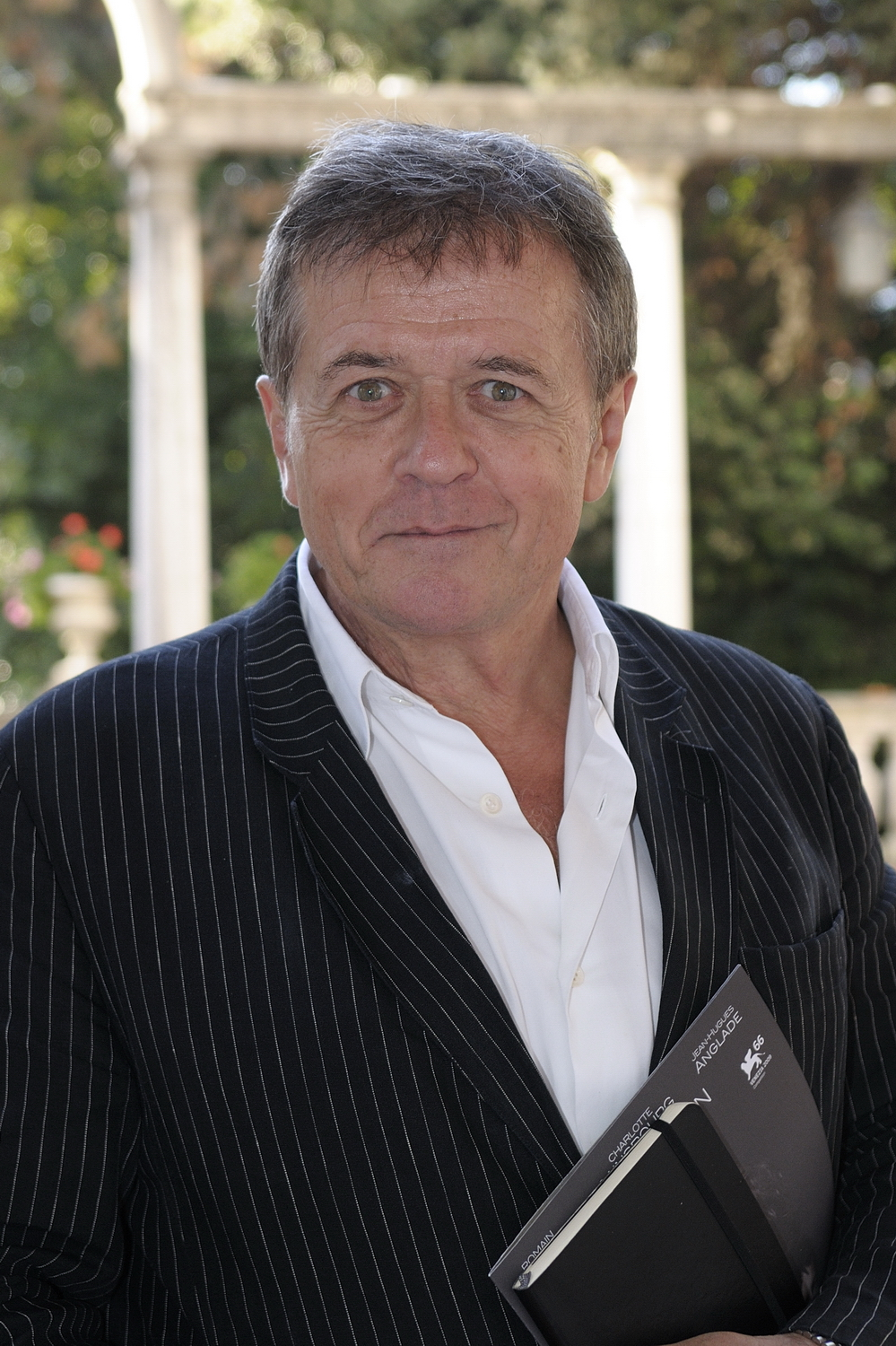
- Chéreau in 2009
- Born: 2 November 1944; Lézigné, France
- Died: 7 October 2013 (aged 68); Clichy, France
- Occupations: Theatre director; opera director; film director; actor; screenwriter; television producer
- Years active: 1966–2013
- Awards: César Award for Best Original Screenplay (1984); Cannes Jury Prize (1994); César Award for Best Director (1998); Golden Berlin Bear (2001); Silver Berlin Bear for Best Director (2003); Europe Theatre Prize (2008)

Patrice Chéreau (/ʃəˈroʊ/; French: [patʁis ʃeʁo]; 2 November 1944 – 7 October 2013) was a French opera and theatre director, filmmaker, actor and producer. In France he is best known for his work for the theatre, internationally for his films La Reine Margot and Intimacy, and for his staging of the Jahrhundertring, the centenary Ring Cycle at the Bayreuth Festival in 1976. Winner of almost twenty movie awards, including the Cannes Jury Prize and the Golden Berlin Bear, Chéreau served as president of the jury at the 2003 Cannes festival.

From 1966, he was artistic director of the Public-Theatre in the Parisian suburb of Sartrouville, where in his team were stage designer Richard Peduzzi, costume designer Jacques Schmidt and lighting designer André Diot, with whom he collaborated in many later productions. From 1982, he was director of "his own stage" at the Théâtre Nanterre-Amandiers at Nanterre where he staged plays by Jean Racine, Marivaux and Shakespeare as well as works by Jean Genet, Heiner Müller and Bernard-Marie Koltès.

He accepted selected opera productions, such as: the first performance of the three-act version of Alban Berg's Lulu, completed by Friedrich Cerha, at the Paris Opera in 1979; Berg's Wozzeck at the Staatsoper Berlin in 1994; Wagner's Tristan und Isolde at La Scala in 2007; Janáček's From the House of the Dead, shown at several festivals and the Metropolitan Opera; and, as his last staging, Elektra by Richard Strauss, first performed at the Aix-en-Provence Festival in July 2013. He was awarded the Europe Theatre Prize in 2008.

== Life and career ==
=== Early life ===
Chéreau was born in Lézigné, Maine-et-Loire, on 2 November 1944. His father, Jean-Baptiste Chéreau, was a painter, and his mother, Marguerite Pelicier, was a graphic designer. He attended school in Paris. Early on he was taken to the Louvre and became interested in the arts, cinema, theatre and music. At age 12, he designed stage sets for plays. He became well known to Parisian critics as director, actor, and stage manager of his high-school theatre (lycée Louis-le-Grand). At 15, he was enthusiastically celebrated as a theatre prodigy. In 1964, at the age of 19, he began directing for the professional theatre. While studying at the Sorbonne, he professionally staged Victor Hugo's L'Intervention, and subsequently dropped out of the university.

=== 1966: Sartrouville ===
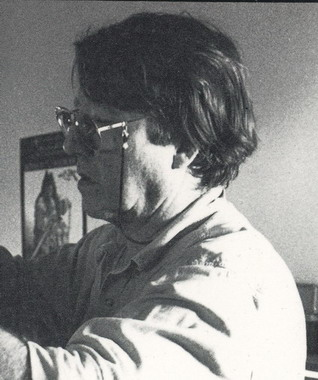
Jacques Schmidt, costume designer

In 1966, Chéreau was appointed artistic director of the Public-Theatre in the Parisian suburb of Sartrouville. With "idealism and inventiveness", he made the theatre a "municipal commodity", presenting not only theatre but also "cinema, concerts, poetry productions, lectures and debates about everything from politics to pot". His theatrical team included costume designer Jacques Schmidt, stage designer Richard Peduzzi and lighting designer André Diot, with all of whom he collaborated in many later productions.

In 1968, he directed The Soldiers by Jakob Michael Reinhold Lenz at the Festival of Youth Theatre in Nancy. In 1969, he staged his first opera production, Rossini's L'italiana in Algeri for the Spoleto Festival, again with his Sartrouville team. The following year he established a close artistic relationship with the leadership of the Piccolo Teatro in Milan, Paolo Grassi and Giorgio Strehler. There, he staged Pablo Neruda's "revolutionary oratorio" The Splendour and Death of Joaquin Murieta. In 1970, he directed Shakespeare's Richard II at the Théâtre de France. His first staging for the Paris Opera was in 1974 Offenbach's Les contes d'Hoffmann. He showed Hoffmann, sung by Nicolai Gedda, as a "sensitive poet for whom love is beyond reach, ... a drunken loser". In 1975, he worked in Germany for the first time directing Edward Bond's Lear, set in an "industrial landscape strewn with piles of slag, with Lear as a Baron Krupp in evening dress and top hat". He commented on the "macabre" production: "Just as some people feed on hope, I feed on despair. For me it is a spur to action." Also in 1975, his directorial debut film was the thriller La Chair de l'orchidée, based on James Hadley Chase's 1948 novel The Flesh of the Orchid, sequel to No Orchids for Miss Blandish (1939). The film assembled a starry cast including Edwige Feuillère, Simone Signoret, Alida Valli and Charlotte Rampling "in the [Miss Blandish] role giving a performance of extraordinary intensity. It was an almost operatic version of the misunderstood 1948 British film."

=== 1976: Bayreuth ===
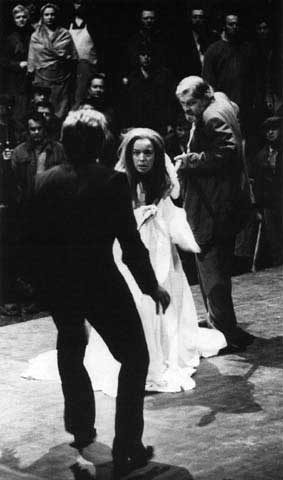
A scene from Götterdämmerung in the 1976 centenary Ring Cycle at the Bayreuth Festival, with Gwyneth Jones as Brünnhilde with Hermann Becht as Hagen standing behind

In 1976, Chéreau staged Wagner's Der Ring des Nibelungen at the Bayreuth Festival to celebrate the festival's centenary, termed the Jahrhundertring. The production, celebrating 100 years after Wagner's work had been performed for the first time as a cycle at the first Bayreuth Festival, became known as the Jahrhundertring (Centenary Ring). Chéreau collaborated with conductor Pierre Boulez, who had recommended him to the festival direction. The French team revolutionised the understanding of Wagner in Germany, as music critic Eleonore Büning wrote in her obituary in the Frankfurter Allgemeine Zeitung. Chéreau set the scene in the time of the composition, with a critical view of the time's capitalism, industrialism and spiritual background. As Büning and others pointed out, the staging left a standard for productions of the Ring Cycle to follow. Gerhard R. Koch mentioned in his obituary that the unity of direction, scene and light was new for Bayreuth and suggested a critical view on capitalism heading towards fascism.

In 1977, when heldentenor René Kollo had broken his leg, Chereau acted the role of Siegfried on stage while Kollo sang from the wings.

The Ring production, filmed for television in 1980, initially provoked controversy, but was celebrated after its final performance in 1980 with a 45-minute standing ovation. Chéreau disliked grand opera, but said: "After Bayreuth, I felt the need to work on a theatrical project of some breadth ... I have never put on little things. I am interested only in spectacles that rise above themselves". He first considered Goethe's Faust but then directed in 1981 Henrik Ibsen's Peer Gynt for Villeurbane and Paris, aiming at "an incandescence of theatrical experience, a global spectacle".

=== 1979: Paris ===
Chéreau directed the first performance of the three-act version of Alban Berg's Lulu, completed by Friedrich Cerha, at the Paris Opera on 24 February 1979, again conducted by Boulez and with sets by Peduzzi, with Teresa Stratas singing the title role. The scene is set in the time of the composition, around 1930. Koch observes frequent topics of hunt, and love colder than death (Verfolger und Verfolgte, und Liebe ... kälter als der Tod). Dr. Schön, a powerful newspaper manager, is reminiscent of supporters of Hitler.

=== 1982: Amandiers ===
From 1982, Chéreau was director of "his own stage" at the Théâtre Nanterre-Amandiers at Nanterre. In 1981 already he staged there Ibsen's Peer Gynt. He was the first to show several plays by Bernard-Marie Koltès, including Combat de nègre et de chiens and Quai Ouest (1985), Dans la solitude des champs de coton (1986) and Le Retour au désert (1988). He directed Marivaux' La Fausse suivante in 1985 and Shakespeare's Hamlet in 1989, also works by Jean Genet, Heiner Müller and Jean Racine. He staged Mozart's Lucio Silla in 1984, for Amandiers, but also for La Monnaie and La Scala.

At the Odéon he staged in 1992 Le Temps et la Chambre by Botho Strauss. He directed Dans la solitude des champs de coton again in 1995, shown at Ivry, the Wiener Festwochen and the Brooklyn Academy of Music. He staged in 2011 Jon Fosse's Je suis le vent in an English version, I Am the Wind, by Simon Stephens at the Young Vic Theatre, with Tom Brooke and Jack Laskey.

=== 1983: more films ===
In 1983, Chéreau directed the film The Wounded Man (L'Homme Blessé), a more personal project for him. He and his co-writer, Hervé Guibert, worked for six years on the scenario, which tells of a love affair between an older man involved in prostitution and a teenage boy, a dark view in the context of HIV/AIDS. His 1994 film was La Reine Margot, based on the 1845 historical novel of the same name by Alexandre Dumas. It won the Jury Prize and Best Actress Award (Virna Lisi) at Cannes, as well as five César Awards. Set in the 16th century, depicting the conflict between Catholics and Protestants in France, it shows battles and the St Bartholomew's day massacre. A scene of the queen with the head of her lover is reminiscent of the opera Salome, uniting cult and obsession ("Einheit von Kult und Obsession"), as Koch remarks. The film was Chéreau's longest, most expensive production, and his greatest financial success. "[I]t was erotic and violent, and offers poured in from Hollywood," but, he said, "I was always being offered films based in the Renaissance and involving a massacre. I even had an offer from the UK to do a film about Guy Fawkes." He refused similar offers: "It's useless to repeat something you already did." In 1992, in a rare acting role, he appeared as General Montcalm in Michael Mann's The Last of the Mohicans.

=== 1993: opera internationally ===
Chéreau's staging of Berg's Wozzeck was shown from 1993 to 1999 at the Théâtre du Châtelet and the Staatsoper Berlin, conducted by Daniel Barenboim, with Franz Grundheber in the title role and Waltraud Meier as Marie. It was filmed in 1994. A review notes the "presentation of even the smallest roles as deeply-considered characters". His staging of Mozart's Don Giovanni was shown from 1994 to 1996 at the Salzburg Festival.

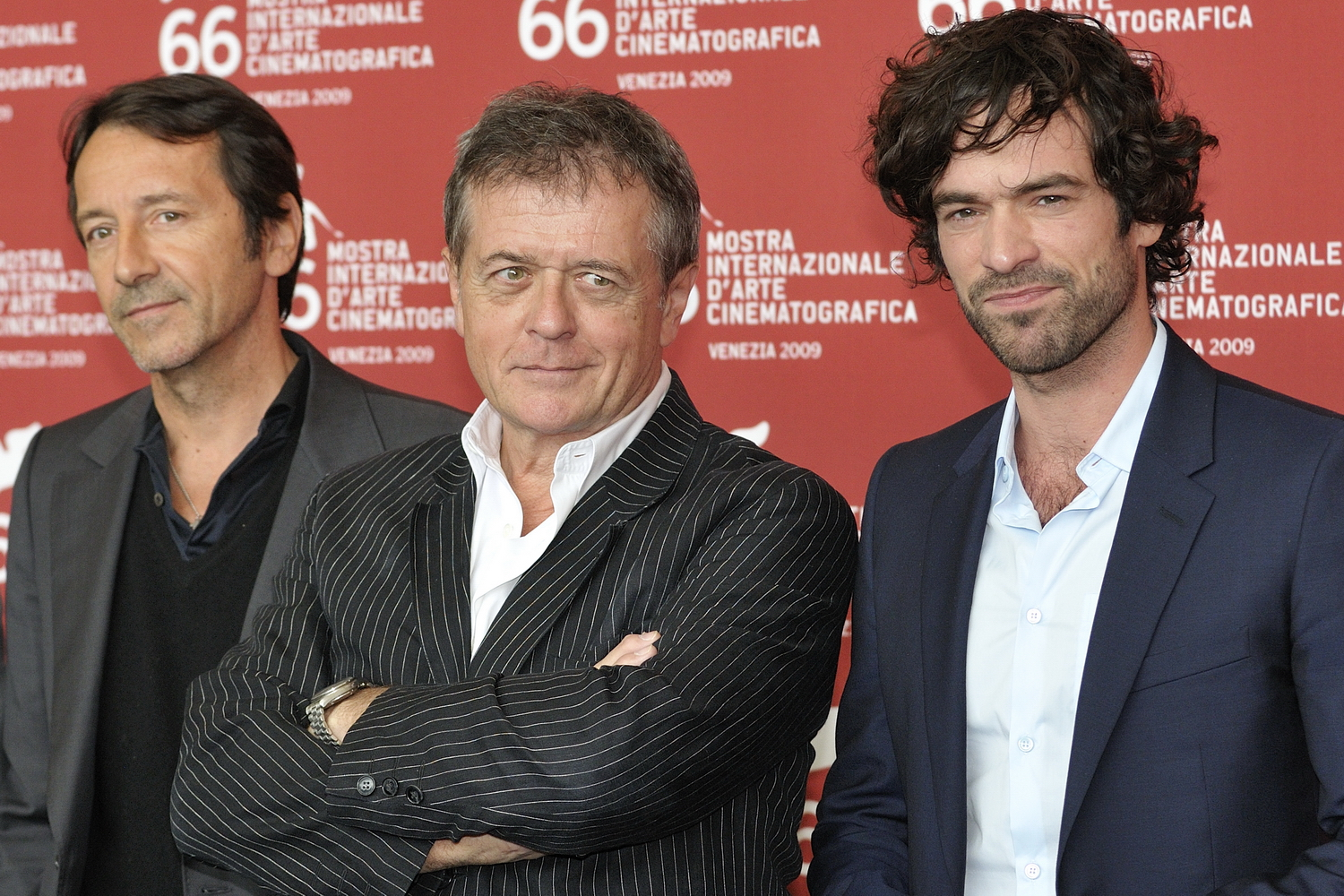
Jean-Hugues Anglade, Chéreau and Romain Duris at the Venice Film Festival, 2009

In 1998, he directed the film Those Who Love Me Can Take the Train, a "melodramatic, sentimental and emptily wordy ... about the interplay of assorted characters on their way to the funeral of a misanthropic, bisexual minor painter (Jean-Louis Trintignant)." The final scene reflects the cemetery of Limoges to the music of Mahler's Tenth Symphony.

Chéreau's only English-language film, Intimacy (2001), was based on short stories by Hanif Kureishi (who also wrote the eponymous novel in 1998). The cast includes Kerry Fox, Mark Rylance, Timothy Spall and Marianne Faithfull. The film deals with "the possessiveness of a musician from London who regularly meets a woman for sexual encounters". It "was a tale of sexual obsession which sparked a debate about unsimulated sex on screen. But, Chéreau said, 'It is not like a porno film, not at all erotic sometimes, but it is beautiful because it is life.'"

In 2003, he directed His Brother (Son frère), centred "on the relationship between two estranged brothers, one gay, the other straight. They come together when the latter suffers from a potentially fatal blood disease. The hospital processes are shot unflinchingly, without sentimentality, which makes this meditation on mortality even more moving." Koch notes the similarity of a scene when the moribund is shaved for a last futile surgery he lies on a table similar to Mantegna's Dead Christ. In 2003 Chéreau served at Cannes as president of the jury.

His staging of Mozart's Così fan tutte was shown in 2005 and 2006 in Aix-en-Provence, the Opéra National de Paris and the Wiener Festwochen. In 2007, he staged Wagner's Tristan und Isolde at La Scala, conducted by Daniel Barenboim. He had stayed away from the opera because he regarded it as "predominantly a musical rather than a theatrical work", but his "sombre, subtle direction – with Waltraud Meier an acutely vulnerable Isolde – was intensely moving".

He directed Leoš Janáček's From the House of the Dead, again conducted by Boulez, first shown at the Vienna Festival in 2007, and later at the Holland Festival, the Aix-en-Provence Festival, the Metropolitan Opera (his debut there in 2009) and La Scala. Chéreau's last film was Persécution (2009), "a gloomy, episodic film" about a man who is "haunted by a love-hate relationship with his girlfriend". His last production was Elektra by Richard Strauss, conducted by Esa-Pekka Salonen, shown at the Aix-en-Provence Festival in July 2013 and scheduled for the MET's 2015–16 season. A review noted: "The clichés of Fascist brutality and expressionist exaggeration are astutely avoided: this is a situation that involves human beings, not caricatures, in a visually neutral environment of bare walls, windows and doors (designed by Richard Peduzzi) which is also blackly portentous in atmosphere."

=== Personal life ===
Chéreau was in a long-term relationship with his lover and favorite actor Pascal Greggory. He was not interested in gay topics, saying: "I never wanted to specialise in gay stories, and gay newspapers have criticised me for that. Everywhere love stories are exactly the same. The game of desire, and how you live with desire, are the same." Chéreau died in Paris on 7 October 2013 from lung cancer. He was 68 years old.

In 2009, Chéreau signed a petition in support of director Roman Polanski, who had been detained while traveling to a film festival in relation to his 1977 sexual abuse charges, which the petition argued would undermine the tradition of film festivals as a place for works to be shown "freely and safely", and that arresting filmmakers traveling to neutral countries could open the door "for actions of which no-one can know the effects."

Chéreau was portrayed by Louis Garrel in the 2022 French-Italian film Forever Young.

== Europe Theatre Prize ==
Chéreau was awarded the Europe Theatre Prize in 2008, in the Edition XII of the prize. The "Reason for award" noted:

A natural-born artist with a clear calling, Patrice Chéreau is one of those rare examples of a person who manages to succeed in all the expressive arts. ... Patrice Chéreau is an actor himself with the indispensable support of a team of creative collaborators, including the great set designer Richard Peduzzi, costume designer Jacques Schmidt and lighting designer André Diot. Drawn through his analysis of Brecht towards a correct naturalism, Chéreau has discovered and revived a number of little known texts, not least thanks to the many languages he has mastered. His extraordinary critical interpretation of Marivaux broke through the playwright's sunny surface to reveal him as a forward-looking, harsh social critic. ... Meanwhile, Chéreau shifted from theatre to opera, ... a scandalous reinterpretation of Wagner's Ring at Bayreuth ... He reached the height of his career during his many years at the Théâtre des Amandiers in Nanterre, where he developed a new model of expression, discovered and launched one of the great dramatists of our time, Bernard Marie Koltès, whose major works he directed, including Combat de nègre et de chiens and Solitude des champs de coton, as well as Shakespeare, Peer Gynt, Heiner Müller, and the historic revival of Les paravents by Genet. Chéreau eventually turned to cinema, which he found more expressive of the truth of life that he so values.

== Filmography ==
=== Director ===
- La Chair de l'orchidée (1975)
- Judith Therpauve (1978)
- L'Homme blessé (1983)
- Hôtel de France (1986)
- Contre l'oubli (1991)
- Queen Margot (1994)
- Dans la solitude des champs de coton (1996, TV version)
- Those Who Love Me Can Take the Train (1998)
- Intimacy (2001)
- His Brother (2003)
- Gabrielle (2005)
- Persécution (2009)

=== Producer ===
(for his company "Azor Films")

- L'Homme blessé (1983)
- Chéreau – L'envers du théâtre (1986, TV documentary)
- Patrice Chéreau, Pascal Greggory, une autre solitude (1995, TV documentary)
- Intimacy (2001)
- Son frère (2003)
- Gabrielle (2005)
- Così fan tutte (2005, TV)

=== Actor ===
- Trotsky (1967, by Jacques Kébadian)
- Danton (1982, by Andrzej Wajda) as Camille Desmoulins
- Adieu Bonaparte (1985, by Youssef Chahine) as Napoléon Bonaparte
- The Last of the Mohicans (1992, by Michael Mann) as General Montcalm
- Bête de scène (1994, Short, by Bernard Nissille) as Le metteur en scène
- Dans la solitude des champs de coton (1996, TV version) as Le dealer
- Lucie Aubrac (1997, by Claude Berri) as Max
- Time Regained (1999, by Raoul Ruiz) as Marcel Proust (voice)
- Nearest to Heaven (2002, by Tonie Marshall) as Pierre
- Time of the Wolf (2003, by Michael Haneke) as Thomas Brandt (final film role)

=== Himself ===
- Chéreau – L'envers du théâtre (1986)
- Il était une fois dix neuf acteurs (1987, TV)
- Patrice Chéreau, Pascal Greggory, une autre solitude (1995, TV)
- Freedom to speak (2004)

=== TV guest appearances ===
- Bleu, blanc, rose (2002, TV)
- Claude Berri, le dernier nabab (2003, TV)
- Thé ou café 14 September 2003

== Film awards and nominations ==
Year	Award	Category	Title	Result
2003	7 d'Or	Screenwriting (shared with Anne-Louise Trividic)	His Brother (2003)	Nominated
1996	BAFTA Awards	BAFTA Award for Best Film Not in the English Language (shared with Pierre Grunstein)	Queen Margot (1994)	Nominated
2003	Berlin International Film Festival	Golden Bear	His Brother (2003)	Nominated
2003	Berlin International Film Festival	Silver Bear for Best Director	His Brother (2003)	Won
2001	Berlin International Film Festival	Golden Bear	Intimacy (2001)	Won
2001	Berlin International Film Festival	Silver Bear for Best Actress (Kerry Fox)	Intimacy (2001)	Won
2001	Berlin International Film Festival	Blue Angel	Intimacy (2001)	Won
1998	Cannes Film Festival	Palme d'Or	Those Who Love Me Can Take the Train (1998)	Nominated
1994	Cannes Film Festival	Jury Prize	Queen Margot (1994)	Won
1994	Cannes Film Festival	Best Actress Award (Virna Lisi)	Queen Margot (1994)	Won
1994	Cannes Film Festival	Palme d'Or	Queen Margot (1994)	Nominated
1983	Cannes Film Festival	Palme d'Or	The Wounded Man (1983)	Nominated
2006	César Awards	Best Adaptation (shared with Anne-Louise Trividic)	Gabrielle (2005)	Nominated
2002	César Awards	Best Director	Intimacy (2001)	Nominated
1999	César Awards	César Award for Best Director	Those Who Love Me Can Take the Train (1998)	Won
1999	César Awards	Best Original Screenplay or Adaptation (shared with Danièle Thompson and Pierre Trividic)	Those Who Love Me Can Take the Train (1998)	Nominated
1995	César Awards	Best Film	Queen Margot (1994)	Nominated
1995	César Awards	Best Director	Queen Margot (1994)	Nominated
1995	César Awards	Best Original Screenplay or Adaptation (shared with Danièle Thompson)	Queen Margot (1994)	Nominated
1995	César Awards	Best Actress (Isabelle Adjani)	Queen Margot (1994)	Won
1995	César Awards	Best Cinematography	Queen Margot (1994)	Won
1995	César Awards	Best Costume Design	Queen Margot (1994)	Won
1995	César Awards	Best Actor in a Supporting Role (Jean-Hugues Anglade)	Queen Margot (1994)	Won
1995	César Awards	Best Actress in a Supporting Role (Virna Lisi)	Queen Margot (1994)	Won
1995	César Awards	Best Editing	Queen Margot (1994)	Nominated
1995	César Awards	Best Music Written for a Film	Queen Margot (1994)	Nominated
1995	César Awards	Best Production Design	Queen Margot (1994)	Nominated
1995	César Awards	Best Actress in a Supporting Role (Dominique Blanc)	Queen Margot (1994)	Nominated
1984	César Awards	Best Original Screenplay (shared with Hervé Guibert)	The Wounded Man (1983)	Won
2009	Chicago International Film Festival	Career Achievement Award		Won
2005	Chicago International Film Festival	Gold Hugo	Gabrielle (2005)	Nominated
1998	Chicago International Film Festival	Gold Hugo	Those Who Love Me Can Take the Train (1998)	Nominated
1983	Chicago International Film Festival	Gold Hugo	The Wounded Man (1983)	Nominated
1999	Étoiles d'Or	Étoiles d'Or for Best Director	Those Who Love Me Can Take the Train (1998)	Won
2001	European Film Awards	Audience Award for Best Director	Intimacy (2001)	Nominated
2001	Louis Delluc Prize	Prix Louis-Delluc	Intimacy (2001)	Won
2002	Lumière Awards	Best Director	Intimacy (2001)	Won
2001	Rio de Janeiro International Film Festival	FIPRESCI Prize for Best European Film	Intimacy (2001)	Won
2008	SACD Awards			Won
2009	Venice Film Festival	Golden Lion	Persécution (2009)	Nominated
2005	Venice Film Festival	Golden Lion	Gabrielle (2005)	Nominated

Main sources

- Patrice Chéreau. Awards at the Internet Movie Database.
- Patrice Chéreau. Awards at Allmovie.
