= Olivier Assayas =

French film director, screenwriter and film critic

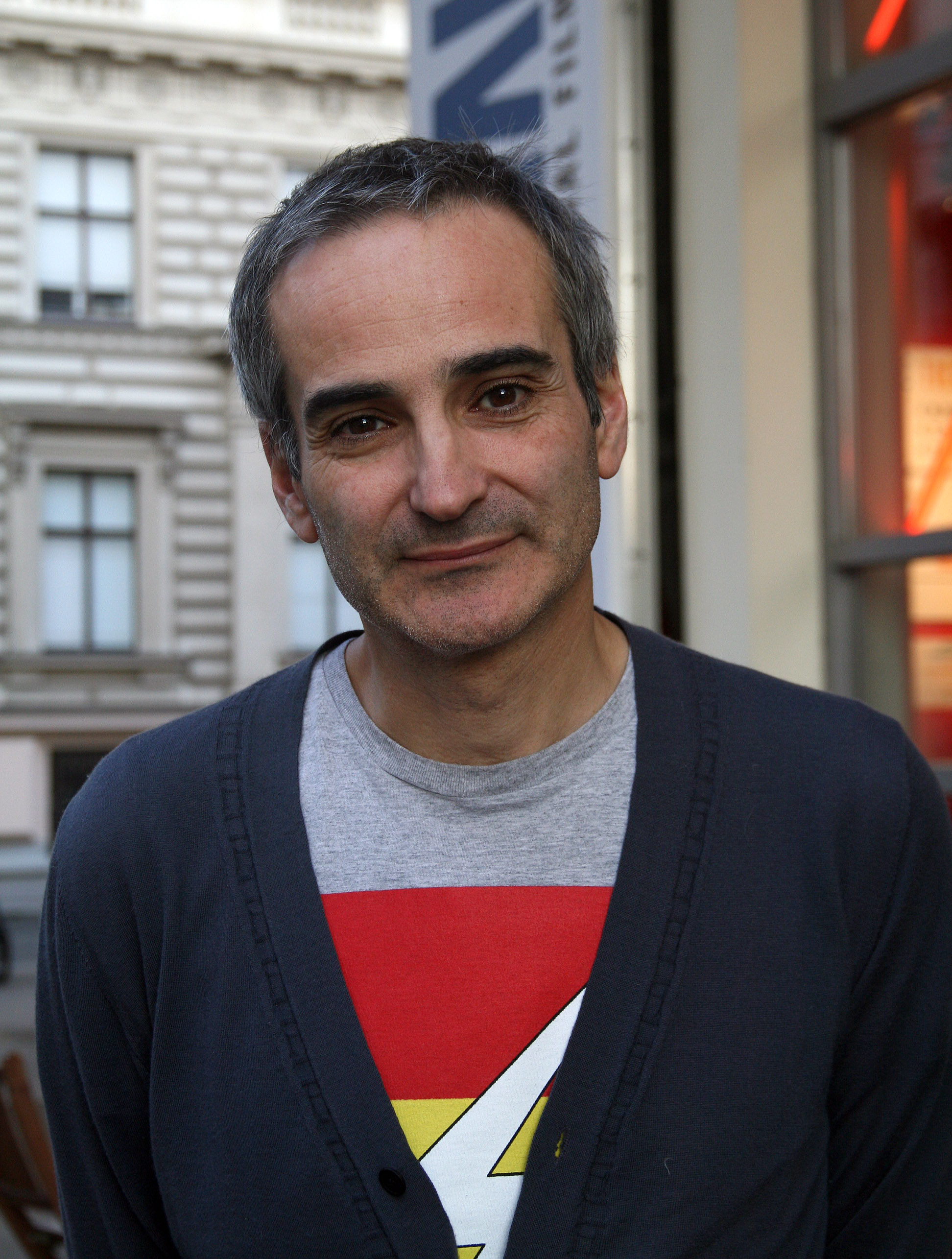
- Assayas in 2010
- Born: 25 January 1955 (age 71); Paris, France
- Occupations: Film director, screenwriter, film critic
- Years active: 1977–present
- Spouse: Maggie Cheung (m. 1998; div. 2001)
- Partner: Mia Hansen-Løve (2002–2017)
- Children: 1
- Parent(s): Raymond Assayas and Catherine de Károlyi
- Relatives: Michka Assayas (brother)

Olivier Assayas (French: [ɔlivje asajas]; born 25 January 1955) is a French film director, screenwriter and film critic. Assayas is known for his eclectic filmography, consisting of slow-burning period pieces, psychological thrillers, neo-noirs, and comedies. He has directed French, Spanish, and English-language films with international casts. The son of filmmaker Jacques Rémy, Assayas began his career as a critic for Cahiers du Cinéma. There he wrote about world cinema and its film auteurs, who later influenced his work. Assayas made several short films, and made his feature debut with Disorder in 1986.

He continued directing feature films, with Cold Water (1994) considered a breakthrough film in his career. It was his first film to screen at the Cannes Film Festival in the Un Certain Regard section. His followup film, Irma Vep (1996), also screened at Cannes, while Sentimental Destinies (2000), Demonlover (2002), and Clean (2004) all officially competed for the Palme d'Or. In 2006, he contributed a short film to the anthology film Paris, je t'aime (2006).

Assayas gained acclaim for his dramas Summer Hours (2008), Clouds of Sils Maria (2014), and Personal Shopper (2016); the latter won him the Cannes Film Festival Award for Best Director. He also directed the comedy Non-Fiction (2018) and the spy thriller Wasp Network (2019).

== Life and career ==
Assayas was born in Paris, France, the son of French director/screenwriter Raymond Assayas, alias Jacques Rémy, and Catherine de Károlyi, a fashion designer. His father was of Turkish-Jewish origin and had settled in Italy before France. His mother was Protestant and of Hungarian origin.

Assayas started his career in the industry by helping his father, ghost-writing episodes for television shows his father was working on when his health failed. In a 2010 interview, Assayas said his main political influences when growing up were Guy Debord and George Orwell. Of the 1968 May uprising to overthrow Charles de Gaulle, Assayas said: "I was defined by the politics of May '68, but for me May '68 was an anti-totalitarian uprising. People seemed to forget that at the occupied Odéon theater, you had crossed flags-black and red, and I was on the side of the black element."

Assayas's biggest hit to date is Irma Vep, starring Maggie Cheung. It is a tribute to both French director Louis Feuillade and Hong Kong cinema.

While working at Cahiers du cinéma, Assayas wrote lovingly about both European and Asian film directors he admired. He has made a documentary, HHH: A Portrait of Hou Hsiao-hsien, about Taiwanese filmmaker Hou Hsiao-hsien.

Assayas married Cheung in 1998. They divorced in 2001, but their relationship remained amicable. In 2004, she starred in his film Clean.

He met actress-director Mia Hansen-Løve when Hansen-Løve, 17 at the time, starred in Assayas's 1998 feature Late August, Early September. He has said they "didn't get together until [she] was 20". They separated in 2017.

In 2009 and 2010, Assayas signed two petitions in support of director Roman Polanski, who had been detained in Switzerland while traveling to a film festival in relation to his 1977 sexual abuse charges in the United States and had long been in exile from the United States. The first petition argued that the detention would undermine the tradition of film festivals as a place for works to be shown "freely and safely". It said that arresting filmmakers traveling to neutral countries could open the door "for actions of which no-one can know the effects".

Assayas directed and co-wrote the 2010 French television miniseries Carlos, about the life of the terrorist Ilich Ramírez Sánchez. Venezuelan actor Édgar Ramírez won the César Award for Most Promising Actor in 2011 for his performance as Carlos.

In April 2011, it was announced that Assayas would be a member of the jury for the main competition at the 2011 Cannes Film Festival.

Assayas's 2012 film Something in the Air was selected to compete for the Golden Lion at the 69th Venice International Film Festival. Assayas won the Osella for Best Screenplay at Venice. His 2014 film Clouds of Sils Maria was selected to compete for the Palme d'Or in the main competition section at the 2014 Cannes Film Festival.

Sils Maria won the Louis Delluc Prize and garnered six César Award nominations, including Best Film, Best Director, and Best Original Screenplay. Kristen Stewart won a César Award for Best Supporting Actress.

In 2016, Assayas won Best Director Award (Cannes Film Festival) for Personal Shopper, which also starred Stewart.

In June 2017, it was announced that Assayas would preside over the 2017 Locarno Film Festival.

== Style and influences ==
In an interview with Nick Pinkerton of Reverse Shot, Assayas talked about his influences:

That radicality in cinema involved just being outside of the world of modern images, and the key to it was the work of Robert Bresson, who has been by far the most important influence in my work, and intellectually it's been the influence of Guy Debord—basically, you know, it's been Debord–Bresson, Bresson–Debord, the things that've always defined my framework, the way I look at the world.

In the 2012 Sight & Sound directors' poll, Assayas listed his ten favorite films as 2001: A Space Odyssey, The Gospel According to St. Matthew, Ludwig, A Man Escaped, Mirror, Napoléon, Playtime, The Rules of the Game, The Tree of Life, and Van Gogh.

== Filmography ==
=== Film ===
Year	Title	Director	Screenwriter	Distribution
1986	Disorder	Yes	Yes	Forum Distribution
1989	Winter's Child	Yes	Yes	Ciné Classic
1991	Paris Awakens	Yes	Yes	Pan-Européenne
1993	A New Life	Yes	Yes	Pyramide Distribution
1994	Cold Water	Yes	Yes	Pan-Européenne
1996	Irma Vep	Yes	Yes	Haut et Court
1998	Late August, Early September	Yes	Yes	PolyGram Film Distribution
2000	Sentimental Destinies	Yes	Yes	Pathé Distribution
2002	Demonlover	Yes	Yes	SND Films
2004	Clean	Yes	Yes	ARP Sélection
2006	Paris, je t'aime	Yes	Yes	Segment: "Quartier des Enfants Rouges"; La Fabrique de Films
2007	Boarding Gate	Yes	Yes	ARP Sélection
2008	Summer Hours	Yes	Yes	MK2 Films
2012	Something in the Air	Yes	Yes	MK2 Films
2014	Clouds of Sils Maria	Yes	Yes	Les Films du Losange
2016	Personal Shopper	Yes	Yes	Les Films du Losange
2018	Non-Fiction	Yes	Yes	Ad Vitam Distribution
2019	Wasp Network	Yes	Yes	Netflix
2024	Suspended Time	Yes	Yes	
2025	The Wizard of the Kremlin	Yes	Yes	

As a writer only

- Passage secret (1985)
- Rendez-vous (1985)
- L'Unique (1986)
- Scene of the Crime (1986)
- Avril brisé (1987)
- Filha da Mãe (1990)
- Alice and Martin (1998)
- Based on a True Story (2017) - Co-written with Roman Polanski

=== Television ===
Year	Title	Director	Screenwriter	Notes
1982	Étoiles et toiles		Yes	Documentary
1994	Tous les garçons et les filles de leur âge...	Yes	Yes	TV series
1997	Cinéma, de notre temps	Yes	Yes	Episode: HHH - Un portrait de Hou Hsiao-hsien
2006	Noise	Yes		Documentary
2007	To Each His Own Cinema	Yes	Yes	Segment: "Recrudescence"
2007	Stockhausen / Preljocaj Dialogue	Yes		Documentary
2008	Eldorado	Yes		Documentary
2010	Carlos	Yes	Yes	miniseries
2022	Irma Vep	Yes	Yes	miniseries

=== Short films ===
Year	Title	Director	Screenwriter	Notes
1978	Nuit féline		Yes	Short film
1979	Copyright	Yes		Short film
1980	Rectangle - Deux chansons de Jacno	Yes		Short film
1980	Scopitone	Yes	Yes	Short film
1982	Laissé inachevé à Tokyo	Yes	Yes	Short film
1984	Winston Tong en studio	Yes		Short documentary
1998	Man Yuk: A Portrait of Maggie Cheung	Yes		Short documentary

== Awards and nominations ==
Year	Award	Category	Project	Result
1991	Prix Jean Vigo		Paris Awakens	Won
2000	Cannes Film Festival	Palme d'Or	Sentimental Destinies	Nominated
2002	Cannes Film Festival	Palme d'Or	Demonlover	Nominated
2004	Cannes Film Festival	Palme d'Or	Clean	Nominated
2008	Boston Society of Film Critics	Best Foreign Language Film	Summer Hours	Won
2008	Los Angeles Film Critics Association	Best Foreign Language Film	Summer Hours	Won
2008	National Society of Film Critics Award	Best Foreign Language Film	Summer Hours	Won
2008	New York Film Critics Circle Award	Best Foreign Language Film	Summer Hours	Won
2008	Toronto Film Critics Association	Best Foreign Language Film	Summer Hours	Won
2010	Primetime Emmy Award	Outstanding Directing for a Limited Series	Carlos	Nominated
2010	César Award	Best Director	Carlos	Nominated
2010	European Film Award	Best Director	Carlos	Nominated
2010	Lumière Awards	Best Film	Carlos	Nominated
2010	Lumière Awards	Best Director	Carlos	Nominated
2010	Los Angeles Film Critics Association	Best Director	Carlos	Won
2010	Globes de Cristal Award	Best Television Film or Television Series	Carlos	Won
2012	Venice International Film Festival	Golden Osella for Best Original Screenplay	Something in the Air	Won
2012	Venice International Film Festival	Fondazione Mimmo Rotella Award	Something in the Air	Won
2012	Venice International Film Festival	Golden Lion	Something in the Air	Nominated
2014	Louis Delluc Prize		Clouds of Sils Maria	Won
2014	Cannes Film Festival	Palme d'Or	Clouds of Sils Maria	Nominated
2014	César Award	Best Film	Clouds of Sils Maria	Nominated
2014	César Award	Best Director	Clouds of Sils Maria	Nominated
2014	César Award	Best Original Screenplay	Clouds of Sils Maria	Nominated
2016	Cannes Film Festival	Best Director	Personal Shopper	Won
2016	Zurich Film Festival	A Tribute To... Award	Lifetime Achievement	Won
