= List of French films of 2020 =

A list of French-produced films scheduled for release in 2020.

== Films ==
Title	Director	Cast	Notes	Release date	Ref.
Atarrabi and Mikelats (Atarrabi et Mikelats)	Eugène Green				
The Big Hit (Un triomphe)	Emmanuel Courcol				
Bye Bye Morons (Adieu les cons)	Albert Dupontel	Virginie Efira, Albert Dupontel, Nicolas Marié			
DNA (ADN)	Maïwenn	Maïwenn, Louis Garrel, Marine Vacth, Fanny Ardant, Dylan Robert		October 28, 2020	
Dustin	Naïla Guiguet	Dustin Muchwitz, Félix Maritaud			
Gaza mon amour	Tarzan Nasser, Arab Nasser	Salim Daw, Hiam Abbass			
A Good Man	Marie-Castille Mention-Schaar	Noémie Merlant, Alysson Paradis			
How to Be a Good Wife (La Bonne épouse)	Martin Provost	Juliette Binoche, Yolande Moreau, Noémie Lvovsky		March 11, 2020	
If It Were Love (Si c'était de l'amour)	Patric Chiha				
Jumbo	Zoé Wittock	Noémie Merlant, Emmanuelle Bercot, Bastien Bouillon, Sam Louwyck			
Lost Bullet (Balle Perdue)	Guilamme Pierret	Alban Lenoir, Nicolas Duvauchelle, Ramzy Bedia		June 19, 2020	
My Best Part (Garçon chiffon)	Nicolas Maury	Nicolas Maury, Nathalie Baye, Arnaud Valois			
Night of the Kings (La Nuit des rois)	Philippe Lacôte	Bakary Koné, Isaka Sawadogo, Steve Tientcheu, Laetitia Ky			
Simply Black (Tout simplement noir)	Jean-Pascal Zadi	Jean-Pascal Zadi, Caroline Anglade, Fary		July 8, 2020	
The Man Who Sold His Skin	Kaouther Ben Hania	Yahya Mahayni, Dea Liane, Koen De Bouw, Monica Bellucci		October 7, 2020	
The Rose Maker (La fine fleur)	Pierre Pinaud	Fatsah Bouyahmed, Catherine Frot, Melan Omerta		October 7, 2020	
The Salt of Tears (Le Sel des larmes)	Philippe Garrel	Logann Antuofermo, Oulaya Amamra			
A Son (Bik Eneich: Un fils)	Mehdi Barsaoui	Najla Ben Abdallah, Sami Bouajila, Youssef Khemiri		August 30, 2019	
Spring Blossom (Seize printemps)	Suzanne Lindon	Suzanne Lindon, Arnaud Valois, Frédéric Pierrot, Dominique Besnehard		August 2020	
Summer of 85 (Été 85)	François Ozon	Félix Lefebvre, Valeria Bruni Tedeschi		July 14, 2020	
