= 2nd Magritte Awards =

2012 Belgian film awards ceremony

- Official poster
- Date: February 4, 2012
- Site: Square; Mont des Arts, Brussels, Belgium
- Hosted by: Helena Noguerra
- Produced by: José Bouquiaux
- Directed by: Vincent J. Gustin

Highlights
- Best Film: The Giants
- Most awards: The Giants (5)
- Most nominations: The Giants (12)

Television coverage
- Network: BeTV

The 2nd Magritte Awards ceremony, presented by the Académie André Delvaux, honored the best films of 2011 in Belgium and took place on February 4, 2012, at the Square in the historic site of Mont des Arts, Brussels beginning at 7:45 p.m. CET. During the ceremony, the Académie André Delvaux presented Magritte Awards in 21 categories. The ceremony was televised in Belgium by BeTV. Film director Bertrand Tavernier presided the ceremony, while actress Helena Noguerra hosted the show for the second time.

The nominees for the 2nd Magritte Awards were announced on January 10, 2012. Films with the most nominations were The Giants with twelve, followed by Bullhead with nine and The Kid with a Bike with eight. The winners were announced during the awards ceremony on February 4, 2012. The Giants won five awards, including Best Film and Best Director for Bouli Lanners. Other multiple winners were Bullhead with four awards, and The Fairy with two.

== Winners and nominees ==
=== Best Film ===
- The Giants (Les Géants)
  - Beyond the Steppes
  - The Fairy (La Fée)
  - The Kid with a Bike (Le Gamin au vélo)

=== Best Director ===
- Bouli Lanners – The Giants (Les Géants)
  - Dominique Abel and Fiona Gordon – The Fairy (La Fée)
  - Jean-Pierre and Luc Dardenne – The Kid with a Bike (Le Gamin au vélo)
  - Sam Garbarski – A Distant Neighborhood (Quartier lointain)

=== Best Flemish Film in Coproduction ===
- Bullhead (Rundskop)
  - 22nd of May (22 mei)
  - Come as You Are (Hasta la Vista)
  - Madly in Love (Smoorverliefd)
  - Pulsar

=== Best Foreign Film in Coproduction ===
- Romantics Anonymous (Les Émotifs anonymes)
  - A Screaming Man (Un homme qui crie)
  - Potiche
  - Route Irish

=== Best Screenplay ===
- Bullhead (Rundskop) – Michael R. Roskam
  - The Giants (Les Géants) – Bouli Lanners and Elise Ancion
  - The Kid with a Bike (Le Gamin au vélo) – Jean-Pierre and Luc Dardenne
  - Romantics Anonymous (Les Émotifs anonymes) – Philippe Blasband

=== Best Actor ===
- Matthias Schoenaerts – Bullhead (Rundskop)
  - Dominique Abel – The Fairy (La Fée)
  - Benoît Poelvoorde – Romantics Anonymous (Les Émotifs anonymes)
  - Jonathan Zaccaï – A Distant Neighborhood (Quartier lointain)

=== Best Actress ===
- Lubna Azabal – Incendies
  - Cécile de France – The Kid with a Bike (Le Gamin au vélo)
  - Isabelle De Hertogh – Come as You Are (Hasta la Vista)
  - Yolande Moreau – The Long Falling (Où va la nuit)

=== Best Supporting Actor ===
- Jérémie Renier – Potiche
  - Laurent Capelluto – The Long Falling (Où va la nuit)
  - Bouli Lanners – Kill Me Please
  - Didier Toupy – The Giants (Les Géants)

=== Best Supporting Actress ===
- Gwen Berrou – The Giants (Les Géants)
  - Virginie Efira – Kill Me Please
  - Tania Garbarski – A Distant Neighborhood (Quartier lointain)
  - Marie Kremer – Final Balance (Légitime Défense)

=== Most Promising Actor ===
- Thomas Doret – The Kid with a Bike (Le Gamin au vélo)
  - Romain David – Black Ocean (Noir océan)
  - David Murgia – Bullhead (Rundskop)
  - Martin Nissen – The Giants (Les Géants)

=== Most Promising Actress ===
- Erika Sainte – She's Not Crying, She's Singing (Elle ne pleure pas, elle chante)
  - Stéphanie Crayencour – Les Mythos
  - Jeanne Dandoy – Bullhead (Rundskop)
  - Hande Kodja – Marieke, Marieke

=== Best Cinematography ===
- The Giants (Les Géants) – Jean-Paul De Zaeytijd
  - Bullhead (Rundskop) – Nicolas Karakatsanis
  - The Kid with a Bike (Le Gamin au vélo) – Alain Marcoen

=== Best Sound ===
- The Fairy (La Fée) – Emmanuel de Boissieu, Fred Meert and Hélène Lamy-Au-Rousseau
  - Bullhead (Rundskop) – Benoît De Clerck, Yves De Mey, Quentin Collette, Christine Verschorren and Benoît Biral
  - The Giants (Les Géants) – Marc Bastien and Thomas Gauder

=== Best Production Design ===
- A Distant Neighborhood (Quartier lointain) – Véronique Sacrez
  - The Giants (Les Géants) – Paul Rouschop
  - The Kid with a Bike (Le Gamin au vélo) – Igor Gabriel
  - The Pack (La Meute) – Eugénie Collet and Florence Vercheval

=== Best Costume Design ===
- The Fairy (La Fée) – Claire Dubien
  - A Distant Neighborhood (Quartier lointain) – Florence Scholtes
  - The Giants (Les Géants) – Elise Ancion

=== Best Original Score ===
- The Giants (Les Géants) – Bram Van Parys
  - Bullhead (Rundskop) – Raf Keunen
  - Trader Games (Krach) – Frédéric Vercheval

=== Best Editing ===
- Bullhead (Rundskop) – Alain Dessauvage
  - The Giants (Les Géants) – Ewin Ryckaert
  - The Kid with a Bike (Le Gamin au vélo) – Marie-Hélène Dozo

=== Best Short Film ===
- Sundays (Dimanches)
  - Back Against the Wall (Dos au mur)
  - Bad Moon (Mauvaise lune)
  - The Wolf's Version (La Version du loup)

=== Best Documentary ===
- LoveMEATender
  - Fritkot
  - In Their Hands (Sous la main de l'autre)
  - Summer of Giacomo (L'estate di Giacomo)

=== Honorary Magritte Award ===
- Nathalie Baye

=== Audience Award ===
- Virginie Efira

== Films with multiple nominations and awards ==
The following ten films received multiple nominations.

- Twelve: The Giants
- Nine: Bullhead
- Eight: The Kid with a Bike
- Five: A Distant Neighborhood and The Fairy
- Three: Romantics Anonymous
- Two: Come as You Are, The Long Falling, Kill Me Please, and Potiche

The following three films received multiple awards.

- Five: The Giants
- Four: Bullhead
- Two: The Fairy

== See also ==
- 37th César Awards
- 17th Lumières Awards
- 2011 in film
