= Charlie Dupont =

Belgian actor

- Born: 23 May 1971 (age 55); Tournai, Belgium
- Occupations: Actor, screenwriter, film director
- Years active: 1997–present
- Spouse: Tania Garbarski (2001–present)
- Children: 2

Charlie Dupont (born 23 May 1971) is a Belgian actor who has appeared in film, television and theatre.

Charlie Dupont was born in Tournai, Belgium. His acting credits include Hard (2008), Largo Winch II (2011), Let My People Go! (2011), Métal Hurlant Chronicles (2012), Les Petits Meurtres d'Agatha Christie (2013), and Le Dernier Diamant (2014). On November 18, 2014, it was announced that Dupont would host the 5th Magritte Awards.

== Personal life ==
He has been married to actress Tania Garbarski since 2001. They have two children.

== Filmography ==
Year	Title	Role	Director	Notes
1997	Faux Contact	Danny Verbeek	Michael Havenith	TV series (1 episode)
2001	Mauvais genres	Courtois	Francis Girod	
2002	Tous les chagrins se ressemblent	The photograph	Luc Béraud	TV movie
2002	La torpille	Damien	Luc Boland	TV movie
2003	Dédales	Charly	René Manzor	
2003	Le tango des Rashevski	Barman	Sam Garbarski	
2004	Le grand rôle	Grichenberg's driver	Steve Suissa	
2004	3 garçons, 1 fille, 2 mariages	Robert	Stéphane Clavier	TV movie
2004	François le célibataire et ses amis formidables	Writer	Ivan Goldschmidt	TV series (1 episode)
2005	Bunker paradise	Charles	Stefan Liberski	
2005	Petit homme	Nicolas	Benoît d'Aubert	TV movie
2005	Nom de code : DP	The guardian	Patrick Dewolf	TV movie
2006	Pom, le poulain	Michiels	Olivier Ringer	
2006	Un ami parfait		Francis Girod (2)	
2006	Anna ne sait pas	Alex	Nicole Palo	Short
2006	Septième ciel Belgique	Nicolas	Luc Boland (2)	TV series (1 episode)
2007	Notable donc coupable	Pascal	Dominique Baron & Francis Girod (3)	TV movie
2007	P.J.	Fauvel	Claire de la Rochefoucauld	TV series (1 episode)
2008	Chez Maupassant	Bonnat	Philippe Monnier	TV series (1 episode)
2008	Le juge est une femme	Doctor	René Manzor (2)	TV series (1 episode)
2008	Melting Pot Café	Alexandre	Jean-Marc Vervoort	TV series (2 episodes)
2008-09	Seconde chance	Vincent Valberg	Vincent Giovanni, Philippe Dajoux, ...	TV series (151 episodes)
2008–present	Hard	Corrado	Cathy Verney, Benoît Pétré, ...	TV series (30 episodes)
2009	Tellement proches	The pottery teacher	Éric Toledano and Olivier Nakache	
2009	Cinéman	The late scholar	Yann Moix	
2009	Comme le temps passe	Jean-Phi	Cathy Verney (2)	Short
2009	Magritte, le jour et la nuit	René Magritte	Henri de Gerlache	TV movie
2009	Panique !	Patrick	Benoît d'Aubert (2)	TV movie
2010	Les meilleurs amis du monde	Jean-Claude's colleague	Julien Rambaldi	
2010	A Distant Neighborhood	The controller	Sam Garbarski (2)	
2010	Le grand jeu	Alexandre	Sylvestre Sbille	Short
2010	Vidocq	Dumont	Alain Choquart	TV series (1 episode)
2010	Melting Pot Café	The photograph	Jean-Marc Vervoort (2)	TV series (1 episode)
2011	Largo Winch II	Podolsky's assistant	Jérôme Salle	
2011	Let My People Go !	Hervé	Mikael Buch	
2011	Les Mythos	Frédéric de Tournon	Denis Thybaud	
2011	BXL/USA	Ruddy	Gaëtan Bevernaege	TV movie
2011	Victor Sauvage	Gabriel St Lazare	Alain Choquart (2)	TV series (1 episode)
2012	Il était une fois, une fois	Serge Luyperts	Christian Merret-Palmair	
2012	La planète des cons		Charlie Dupont & Gilles Galud	TV movie
2012	Metal Hurlant Chronicles	Kull	Guillaume Lubrano	TV series (1 episode)
2013	Joséphine	Julien	Agnès Obadia	
2013	Les Petits Meurtres d'Agatha Christie	Roland Delavallée	Marc Angelo	TV series (1 episode)
2014	Le Dernier Diamant	Michael Wurst	Éric Barbier	
2014	Le Père Noël	The robbed	Alexandre Coffre	
2014	Belle comme la femme d'un autre	Charles de Gâtines	Catherine Castel	
2014	Fais pas ci, fais pas ça	Loïc Leguédec	Michel Leclerc & Cathy Verney (3)	TV series (2 episodes)
2015	Deux au carré	William	Philippe Dajoux (2)	Also Writer
2015	Aquabike	Aquaman	Jean Baptiste Saurel	Short
2015	Presque comme les autres	Michel	Renaud Bertrand	TV movie
2016	Odd Job	Jeff	Pascal Chaumeil	Nominated – Magritte Award for Best Supporting Actor
2017	Don't Tell Her	Jonathan Levi	Solange Cicurel	
2017	Baby Bump(S)	Romain	Noémie Saglio	
2018	Brillantissime		Michèle Laroque	

== Theater ==
Year	Title	Author	Director	Notes
2013	Promenade de santé	Nicolas Bedos	Hélène Theunissen	Théâtre Le Public
2014	Lapin blanc, lapin rouge	Nassim Soleimanpour	Nassim Soleimanpour	Théâtre Le Public
2015	Tuyauterie	Philippe Basband	Philippe Basband	Théâtre du Chêne Noir
