= Charles Gillibert =

French film producer (born 1977)

- Born: 14 September 1977 (age 49); Tassin-la-Demi-Lune
- Occupations: Film producer Founder of CG Cinéma

Charles Gillibert (born 14 September 1977) is a French film producer. Since 2021, he has served as the president of Les Films du Losange.

== Life and career ==
Gillibert was born in Tassin-la-Demi-Lune. His parents were Michel Gillibert and Françoise Barquin; he is the brother of the actress Violaine Gillibert and Emmanuel Gillibert, the head of Eggs publicity agency.

In 1995 Gillibert and Nathanaël Karmitz founded the film production company NADA as well as the Kieslowski Award, producing around a hundred short films, art videos and documentaries, many of which were awarded in most of international film festivals.

In 2002, NADA merged with the MK2 group and Charles Gillibert launched MK2 Music, a label in the heart of the connection between music and moving images, facing new creative formats, giving rise to the first cinemix performances. MK2 Music has also produced modern dance performance films with artists such as William Forsythe directed by Thierry de Mey (One Flat Thing Reproduced), Merce Cunningham directed by Charles Atlas (Biped/Pondway) and Angelin Preljocaj by Olivier Assayas (Sonntags Abschied).

Beginning from 2006, Gillibert produced feature films for MK2 on an international scale, he produced more than fifteen feature films until 2013 within MK2 with authors/directors such as Gus Van Sant, Abbas Kiarostami, Walter Salles, Xavier Dolan, Olivier Assayas and Abdellatif Kechiche. Between 2010 and 2013 Charles Gillibert was a member of the MK2 management board . In January 2013, he created CG CINEMA, his own film production company internationally oriented and focused on directors development.

In 2013, Gillibert collaborated in the creation of the investment company Cinémaphore with Julie Gayet and François Pinault before being called by Centre National de la Cinématographie to sit at the Commission for reflection on the new French film financing models.

In 2014, CG CINEMA introduced its first production Clouds of Sils Maria by Olivier Assayas selected at the Cannes Film Festival, then Eden by Mia Hansen-Løve selected at the Toronto International Film Festival and the company co-produced Desierto by Jonás Cuarón with Alfonso Cuarón.

As of July 2021, Gillibert has served as president of the French film studio Les Films du Losange alongside managing director Alexis Dantec. They purchased the company from its longtime manager Margaret Ménégoz.

== Selected filmography ==
Year	Title	Director	Notes
2007	Paranoid Park	Gus Van Sant	In Competition – 2007 Cannes Film Festival
2007	Summer Hours	Olivier Assayas	
2010	Black Venus	Abdellatif Kechiche	In Competition – 2010 Venice Film Festival
2010	Certified Copy	Abbas Kiarostami	In Competition – 2010 Cannes Film Festival
2011	Stretch	Charles de Meaux	
2011	The Fairy	Dominique Abel, Fiona Gordon and Bruno Romy	Directors' Fortnight – 2011 Cannes Film Festival
2012	On the Road	Walter Salles	In Competition – 2012 Cannes Film Festival
2012	Like Someone in Love	Abbas Kiarostami	In Competition – 2012 Cannes Film Festival
2012	Laurence Anyways	Xavier Dolan	Un Certain Regard – 2012 Cannes Film Festival
2012	Something in the Air	Olivier Assayas	In Competition – 2012 Venice Film Festival; Golden Osella for Best Screenplay
2014	Clouds of Sils Maria	Olivier Assayas	In Competition – 2014 Cannes Film Festival
2015	Mustang	Deniz Gamze Ergüven	Directors' Fortnight – 2015 Cannes Film Festival; Nominated – Academy Award for Best Foreign Language Film
2016	Things to Come	Mia Hansen-Løve	
2016	Rosalie Blum	Julien Rappeneau	
2016	Personal Shopper	Olivier Assayas	In Competition – 2016 Cannes Film Festival
2016	Lost in Paris	Dominique Abel and Fiona Gordon	
2017	Kings	Deniz Gamze Ergüven	
2017	24 Frames	Abbas Kiarostami	
2018	Knife + Heart	Yann Gonzalez	In Competition – 2018 Cannes Film Festival
2018	Non-Fiction	Olivier Assayas	In Competition – 2018 Venice Film Festival
2020	My Best Part	Nicolas Maury	
2021	Bergman Island	Mia Hansen-Løve	In Competition – 2021 Cannes Film Festival
2021	Annette	Leos Carax	In Competition – 2021 Cannes Film Festival
2022	Nobody's Hero	Alain Guiraudie	
2022	Scarlet	Pietro Marcello	Directors' Fortnight – 2022 Cannes Film Festival
2022	Rodeo	Lola Quivoron	Un Certain Regard – 2022 Cannes Film Festival
2023	A Silence	Joachim Lafosse	
2024	It's Not Me	Leos Carax	Cannes Premiere – 2024 Cannes Film Festival
2024	Misericordia	Alain Guiraudie	Cannes Premiere – 2024 Cannes Film Festival
2024	Filmlovers!	Arnaud Desplechin	Special Screenings – 2024 Cannes Film Festival
2025	The Chronology of Water	Kristen Stewart	
2026	Minotaur	Andrey Zvyagintsev	In Competition – 2026 Cannes Film Festival
TBA	Couture	Alice Winocour	Post-production
