= ZFF =

ZFF may refer to:

- Zagreb Film Festival, a Croatian film festival
- Zurich Film Festival, a Swiss film festival
