= Julie Duclos =

French actress and director

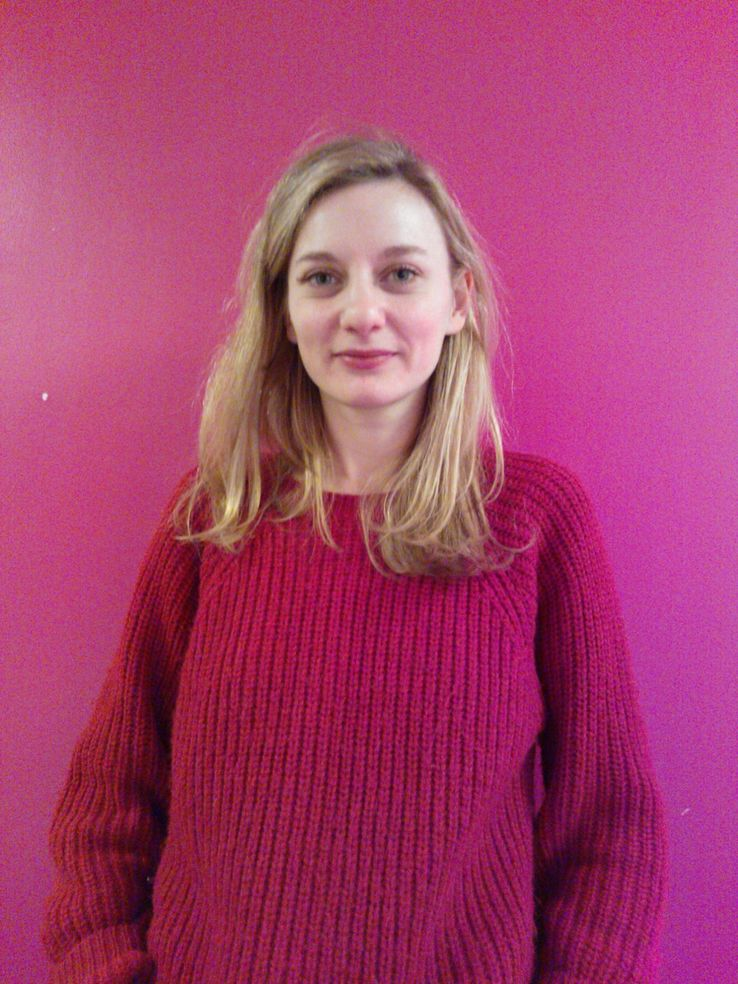
- Occupations: Actress, director
- Years active: 2001–present
- Parent: Philippe Duclos

Julie Duclos is a French director and actress, founder of the theater company L'In-quarto. She is the daughter of an actor Philippe Duclos.

== Career ==
Duclos attended at the National Academy of Dramatic Arts (CNSAD) in Paris (2010 promotion) with Dominique Valadié and Alain Françon. She created her first show there in 2009, A Lover's Discourse: Fragments, adapted from the essay by Roland Barthes, which was then resumed at La Loge (Paris) in 2011, then at the MESS Festival in Sarajevo in 2012.

With the same group of actors from CNSAD, in 2012 Duclos created the show Masculin/Féminin, a laboratory of theatrical creation between reality and fiction then Nos Serments at the Théâtre national de la Colline, in collaboration with Guy-Patrick Sainderichin, very freely inspired by the film The Mother and the Whore of Jean Eustache. This show is adapted as part of a radio fiction about France Culture, entitled A force de rêve tout bas.

She again collaborates with the Théâtre national de la Colline for MayDay, a play by Dorothée Zumstein, inspired by the news story Mary Bell, found guilty of the murder of 2 young children at the age of 10.

As part of the Avignon Festival 2019, Duclos stages Pelléas et Mélisande by Maeterlinck at la Fabrica. The modern set design and the subtle use of the video include critically acclaimed, as well as the acting Alix Riemer, Matthew Sampeur, Philippe Duclos and Vincent Dissez.

Julie Duclos is currently associated with the National Theater of Brittany (TNB) directed by Arthur Nauzyciel and is part of the teaching team of the school of TNB.

Actress of theater and cinema, she plays in particular in By the Grace of God by François Ozon.

== Theater ==
- A Lover's Discourse: Fragments (2009), after Roland Barthes
- Masculin/Féminin (2012), by Julie Duclos
- Nos Serments (2015), by Guy-Patrick Sainderichin and Julie Duclos
- MayDay (2016), by Dorothée Zumstein
- Pelléas et Mélisande (2019), by Maurice Maeterlinck

== Filmography ==
=== Film ===
- Les fantômes de Louba (2001) as girl #1
- Les deux vies du serpent (2006) as the bourgeois girl
- The Sword and the Rose (2010) as Julie
- Crime d'État (2013 television film) as Fabienne Boulin
- By the Grace of God (2018) as Aline Debord

=== Television ===
- P.J. (2006) as Nathnaelle
- Famille d'accueil (2008) as Olivia
- Julie Lescaut (2009) as Roxane Dupuy
- Les Dames (2010) as Diane
- Les limiers (2013) as Ester Monin
- Dr Blanche's Clinic (2014 television film) as Félicie
- Good People (Des gens bien, 2022) as Sylvie Martin
