= Berrou =

Berrou is a surname. Notable people with the surname include

- Claude Berrou (born 1951), French professor in electrical engineering
- Gwen Berrou, Belgian actress
- Jean Maxence Berrou (born 1985), French modern pentathlete
