= Don't Tell Her =

- Directed by: Solange Cicurel
- Written by: Solange Cicurel; Jacques Akchoti
- Produced by: Diana Elbaum; Olivier Albou; Laurence Schonberg; Tanguy Dekeyser; Sébastien Delloye; François Touwaide; Arlette Zylberberg
- Starring: Jenifer; Camille Chamoux; Tania Garbarski; Stéphanie Crayencour; Brigitte Fossey
- Cinematography: Hichame Alaouié
- Edited by: Yannick Leroy
- Music by: Emilie Gassin; Benjamin Violet
- Production company: Entre Chien et Loup
- Distributed by: Sony Pictures Releasing
- Release dates: 29 November 2016 (Lyon premiere); 4 January 2017
- Running time: 96 minutes
- Countries: France, Belgium
- Language: French
- Box office: $776.000

Don't Tell Her (or Faut pas lui dire) is a 2016 French-Belgian comedy film directed and written by Solange Cicurel. It received two nominations at the 8th Magritte Awards, winning Best First Feature Film.

== Plot ==
Laura, Eve, Anouk and Yael are cousins and have one thing in common, they lie but always out of love! When the first three discover a few weeks before the wedding of Yael that her perfect fiancé is cheating on her, they vote in unison "Don't Tell Her".

== Cast ==
- Jenifer as Laura Brunel
- Camille Chamoux as Eve Brunel
- Tania Garbarski as Anouch
- Stéphanie Crayencour as Yaël
- Arié Elmaleh as Maxime Leclercq
- Laurent Capelluto as Daniel Kantarian
- Fabrizio Rongione as Alain Grégoire
- Charlie Dupont as Jonathan Levi
- Clément Manuel as Stéphane Jonet
- Benjamin Bellecour as Ben
- Stéphane Debac as David
- Brigitte Fossey as Violette
