= Zagreb Film Festival =

Annual film festival in Croatia

Coordinates: 45°48′N 15°58′E

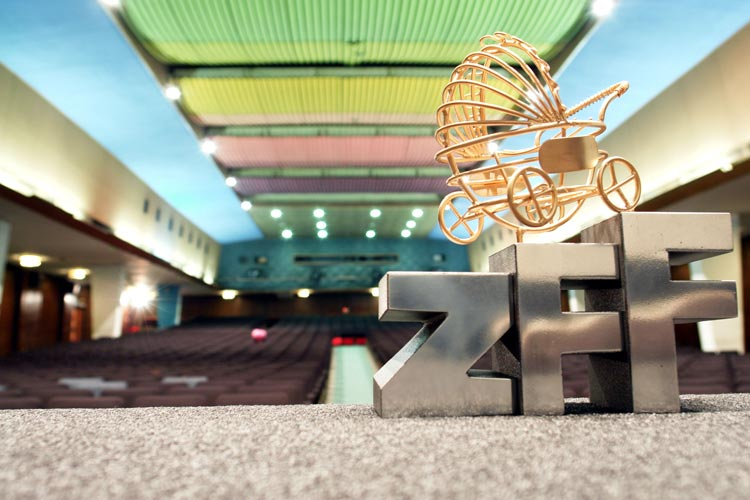
- Location: Zagreb, Croatia
- Founded: 2003
- Most recent: 2024
- Awards: Golden Pram award
- Directors: Boris T. Matić
- Artistic director: Selma Mehadžić
- Festival date: Opening: 10 November 2025; Closing: 16 November 2025
- Language: International
- Website: zff.hr/en/

Current: 22nd
- 23rd 21st

Zagreb Film Festival (ZFF) is an annual film festival held since 2003 in Zagreb, Croatia. Focusing on promoting young and upcoming filmmaker, the festival is widely considered to be one of the most important and influential cultural events in Croatia. It also regularly features several international programmes for the filmmaker's first or second films made.

Each festival edition usually features three international competition programs (for feature films, short films, and documentary films), and one short film competition program for Croatian filmmakers. In addition, the festival often hosts non-competitive screenings, such as selections of children's films or screenings of debut works made by established film directors.

Since 2006 the festival's main award is called Golden Pram. From 2003 to 2005 the main award was called Golden Bib. The 22nd edition of the Festival took place from 4 to 10 November 2024, while the 23rd edition of the festival took place from 10 to 16 November 2025.

== Awards ==
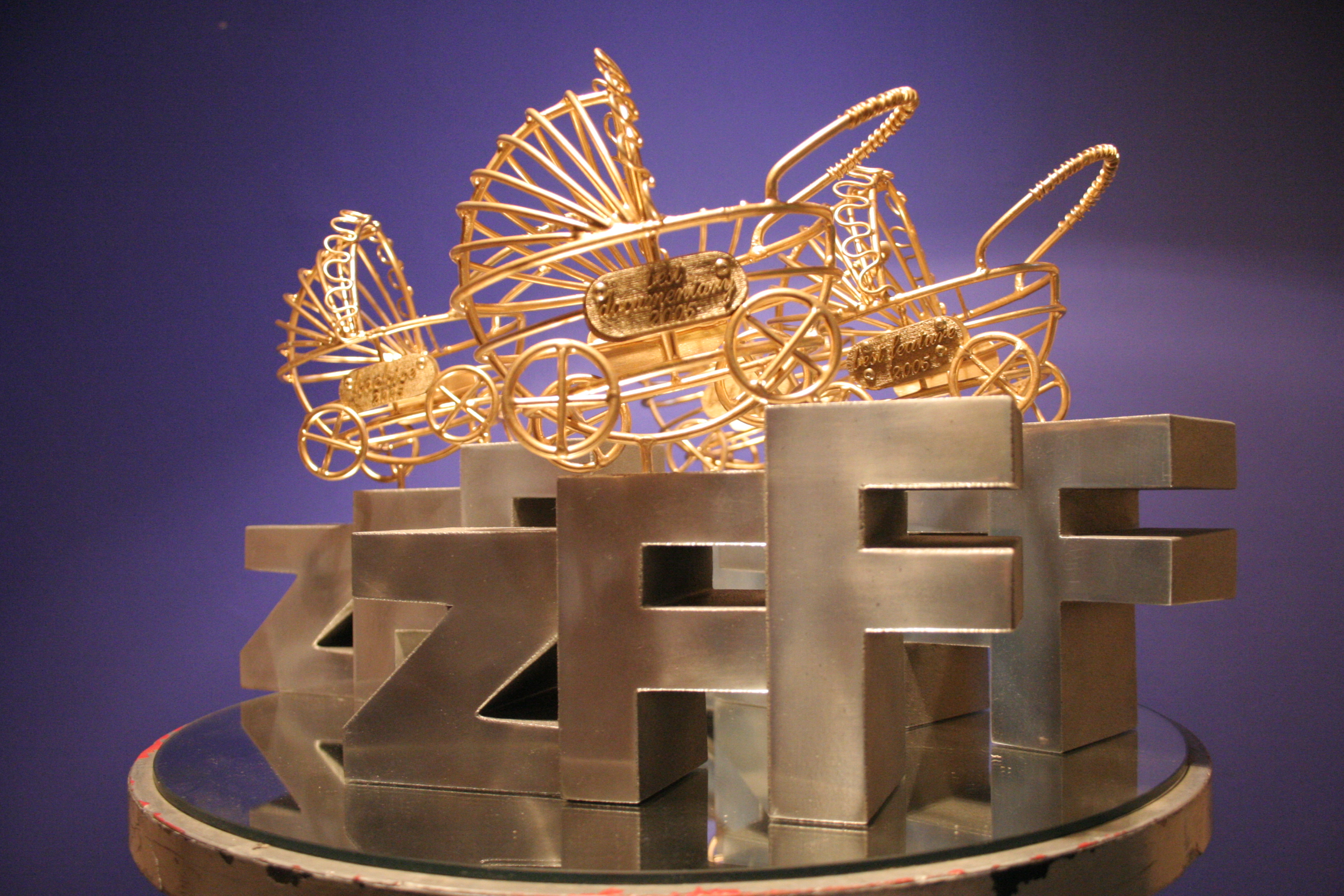
Golden Pram award

Prizes are awarded in the following categories:

- The Zlatna kolica (Golden Pram) (called Golden Bib until 2005) award is given in the following categories:
  - Best Feature Film in the international selection
  - Best Short Film in the international selection
  - Best Documentary Film in the international selection
  - Best Short Film by a Croatian author (introduced in 2005)
- The VIP Audience Award for best film overall, as voted by audience (introduced in 2005)

== Award winners ==
=== Best Feature Film ===
Year	International title	Director(s)	Country
2003 (1st)	The Return	Andrey Zvyagintsev	Russia
2004 (2nd)	Blind Shaft	Li Yang	China
2005 (3rd)	Iceberg	Dominique Abel, Fiona Gordon, Bruno Romy	Belgium
2006 (4th)	The Lives of Others	Florian Henckel von Donnersmarck	Germany
2007 (5th)	The Banishment	Andrey Zvyagintsev	Russia
2008 (6th)	Rumba	Dominique Abel, Fiona Gordon, Bruno Romy	Belgium
2009 (7th)	I Killed My Mother	Xavier Dolan	Canada
2010 (8th)	The Robber	Benjamin Heisenberg	Germany
2011 (9th)	Michael	Markus Schleinzer	Austria
2012 (10th)	Everybody in Our Family	Radu Jude	Romania
2013 (11th)	The Lunchbox	Ritesh Batra	India
2014 (12th)	Blind Dates	Levan Koguashvili	Georgia
2015 (13th)	Son of Saul	László Nemes	Hungary
2016 (14th)	Clash	Mohamed Diab	Egypt
2017 (15th)	Men Don’t Cry	Alen Drljević	Bosnia and Herzegovina
2018 (16th)	The Load	Ognjen Glavonić	Serbia
2019 (17th)	Ivana the Terrible	Ivana Mladenović	Serbia
2020 (18th)	Oasis	Ivan Ikić	Serbia
2021 (19th)	Great Freedom	Sebastian Meise	Austria
2022 (20th)	Joyland	Saim Sadiq	Pakistan
2023 (21st)	How to Have Sex	Molly Manning Walker	United Kingdom

=== Best Documentary Film ===
Year	English title	Original title	Director(s)	Country
2003	Son's Job		Jade D'Cruz	United Kingdom
2004	Checkpoint	Machssomim	Yoav Shamir	Israel
2005	First on the Moon	Pervye na Lune	Aleksey Fedorchenko	Russia
2006	I, Soldier		Köken Ergun	Turkey
2007	The Alpha Diaries	Shalom Pluga Aleph	Yaniv Berman	Israel
2008	The Red Race		Gan Chao	China
2009	La vida loca		Christian Poveda	France
2010	Me, My Gipsy Family and Woody Allen	Io, la mia famiglia rom e Woody Allen	Laura Halilovic	Italy
2011	At the Edge of Russia	Koniec Rosji	Michal Marczak	Poland
2012	Slaughter Nick for President		Rob Stewart	Canada
2013	The Captain and His Pirate		Andy Wolff	Germany
2014	Karpotrotter	Karpopotnik	Matjaž Ivanišin	Slovenia

=== The Golden Pram for Best Croatian Film ===
Year	Title	Director
2012	Terarij	Hana Jušić
2013	Ko da to nisi ti	Ivan Sikavica
2014	Tlo pod nogama	Sonja Tarokić
2015	Zvjerka	Daina Oniunas-Pusić
2016	Mliječni zub	Saša Ban
2017	Čistačica	Matija Vukšić
2018	Bila soba	Mladen Stanić
2019	Druker	Rino Barbir
2020	U šumi	Sara Grgurić
2021		
