= Emmanuelle Riva =

French actress (1927–2017)

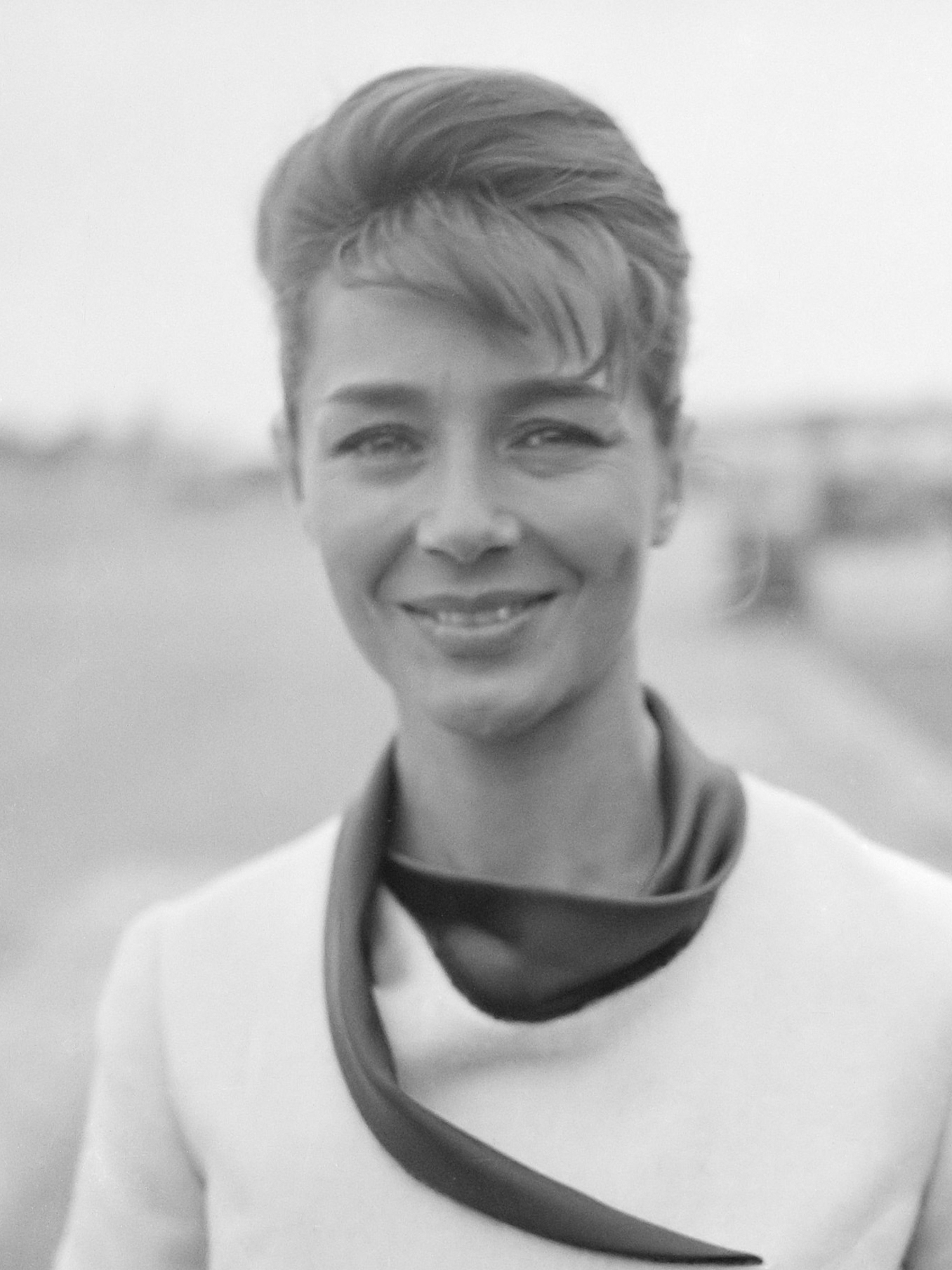
- Riva in 1962
- Born: Paulette Germaine Riva; 24 February 1927; Cheniménil, France
- Died: 27 January 2017 (aged 89); Paris, France
- Resting place: Cimetière de Charonne, Paris
- Occupations: Actress; poet; photographer; artist; chanteuse
- Years active: 1956–2017

Emmanuelle Riva (French pronunciation: [ɛmanɥɛl ʁiva]; 24 February 1927 – 27 January 2017) was a French actress, best known for her roles in the films Hiroshima mon amour (1959) and Amour (2012).

Riva was nominated for a BAFTA Award for her role in Hiroshima mon amour, and won Best Actress at the Venice Film Festival for Thérèse Desqueyroux (1962). For her lead role in Michael Haneke's Amour, she won a BAFTA Award and the César Award, and was nominated for an Academy Award.

== Early life ==
Riva was born Paulette Germaine Riva on 24 February 1927 in Cheniménil, France, the daughter of Jeanne Fernande (née Nourdin), a seamstress, and René Alfred Riva, a sign painter.

Growing up in Remiremont, Riva showed an early passion for acting, performing in plays at her local theatre, but worked for several years as a seamstress. After seeing an advertisement on a local newspaper, Riva applied to an acting school in Paris.

At 26, she moved to Paris to pursue acting despite her family's objections. In 1954, she performed her first role on stage in a Paris production of George Bernard Shaw's Arms and the Man. In 1957, Riva made her onscreen acting debut in the TV series Énigmes de l'histoire.

== Career ==
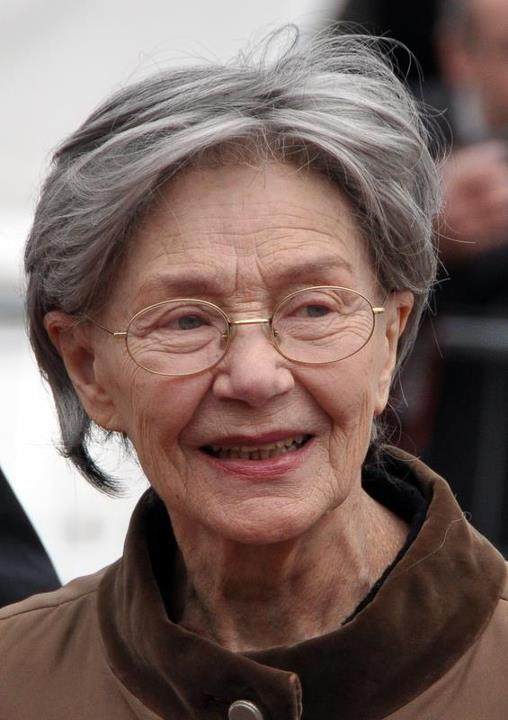
Emmanuelle Riva at the 2012 Cannes Film Festival

=== Film ===
Riva was cast as one of the leads in Hiroshima mon amour (1959), a film directed by Alain Resnais and written by Marguerite Duras, in which she played a French actress having an affair with a Japanese architect (Eiji Okada) in Hiroshima. Her performance was nominated for a BAFTA Award for Best Foreign Actress in 1960. She next appeared in Gillo Pontecorvo's Kapò (1960), Jean-Pierre Melville's Léon Morin, Priest (1961) and Georges Franju's Thérèse Desqueyroux (1962), for which she won the Volpi Cup for Best Actress at the 23rd Venice International Film Festival. Riva also appeared in Krzysztof Kieślowski's Three Colors: Blue (1993), Tonie Marshall's Venus Beauty Institute (1999), Julie Delpy's Skylab (2011) and Fiona Gordon & Dominique Abel 's Lost in Paris (2016).

Riva starred in Michael Haneke's film Amour (2012) with Jean-Louis Trintignant, playing an elderly music teacher being cared for by her husband after a series of debilitating strokes. She won the BAFTA Award for Best Actress in a Leading Role in 2013 for her performance, and was nominated for the Academy Award for Best Actress. Riva traveled to the 85th Academy Awards ceremony, which was held on her 86th birthday, but Jennifer Lawrence won for Silver Linings Playbook instead. At 85, when she was nominated, Riva was the oldest ever Best Actress nominee and the second-oldest acting nominee after Gloria Stuart, who was 87 when she was nominated for Titanic (1997).

=== Other works ===
Riva had an extensive theatre career in Paris. In 2001, she performed in Medea at the Festival d'Avignon. She appeared occasionally on French television. Riva returned to the Paris stage in February 2014, co-starring with Anne Consigny in the Marguerite Duras play Savannah Bay at the Théâtre de l'Atelier.

While filming Hiroshima mon amour, Riva photographed Hiroshima; a half-century later these photographs were exhibited at the Nikon Salon and issued in book form in France and Japan. Riva was a published poet.

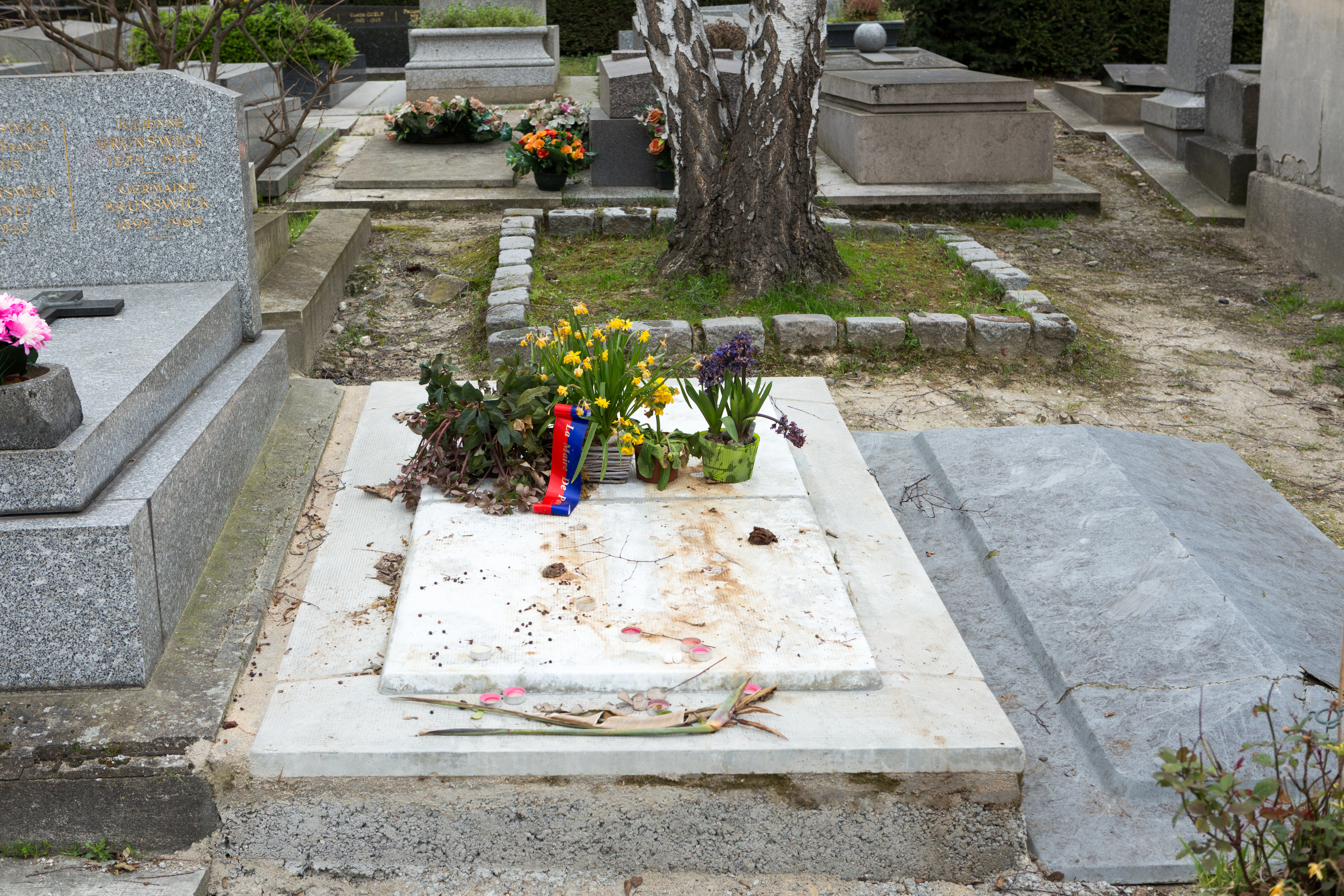
Riva's final resting place in Paris

== Personal life ==
Riva led a private life, never married and did not have children. She had a partner, who died in 1999. Riva owned a fourth-floor walk-up apartment in the Latin Quarter of Paris, and lived there for more than half a century.

== Death ==
Riva died from cancer on 27 January 2017 in Paris, four weeks before her 90th birthday. A memorial service was held on 4 February 2017 at Saint-Germain de Charonne church in the 20th arrondissement of Paris; she was then buried in Charonne cemetery.

== Selected filmography ==
Year	Title	Director	Notes
1959	Hiroshima mon amour	Alain Resnais	Nominated—BAFTA Award for Best Foreign Actress
1959	Kapò	Gillo Pontecorvo	
1960	The Eighth Day	Marcel Hanoun	
1960	Adua and Friends	Antonio Pietrangeli	
1960	Recourse in Grace	Laslo Benedek	
1961	Léon Morin, Priest	Jean-Pierre Melville	
1962	Thérèse Desqueyroux	Georges Franju	Volpi Cup for Best Actress
1962	Climats	Stellio Lorenzi	
1963	The Hours of Love	Luciano Salce	
1963	Le gros coup	Jean Valère	
1965	Thomas the Impostor	Georges Franju	
1967	Les risques du métier	André Cayatte	
1972	The Gates of Fire	Claude Bernard-Aubert	
1973	I Will Walk Like a Crazy Horse	Fernando Arrabal	
1982	The Eyes, the Mouth	Marco Bellocchio	
1983	Liberté, la nuit	Philippe Garrel	
1993	Three Colors: Blue	Krzysztof Kieślowski	
1999	Venus Beauty Institute	Tonie Marshall	
2001	Médée	Don Kent	
2009	A Man and His Dog	Francis Huster	
2011	Le Skylab	Julie Delpy	
2012	Amour	Michael Haneke	BAFTA Award for Best Actress in a Leading Role; Boston Society of Film Critics Award for Best Actress; César Award for Best Actress; Dublin Film Critics' Circle Award for Best Actress; European Film Award for Best Actress; International Cinephile Society Award for Best Actress; London Film Critics' Circle Award for Actress of the Year; Los Angeles Film Critics Association Award for Best Actress (tied with Jennifer Lawrence for Silver Linings Playbook); Lumière Award for Best Actress; National Society of Film Critics Award for Best Actress; New York Film Critics Online Award for Best Actress; Premio Cinema Ludus for Best European Actress (tied with Marion Cotillard for Rust and Bone); San Francisco Film Critics Circle Award for Best Actress; Nominated—Academy Award for Best Actress; Nominated—AACTA International Award for Best Actress; Nominated—Alliance of Women Film Journalists Award for Best Actress; Nominated—Broadcast Film Critics Association Award for Best Actress; Nominated—Chicago Film Critics Association Award for Best Actress; Nominated—Dallas-Fort Worth Film Critics Association Award for Best Actress; Nominated—Dorian Award for Best Actress; Nominated—Houston Film Critics Society for Best Actress; Nominated—Irish Film & Television Awards – Best International Actress; Nominated—Online Film Critics Society Award for Best Actress; Nominated—New York Film Critics Circle Award for Best Actress; Nominated—Satellite Award for Best Actress – Motion Picture Drama; Nominated—Toronto Film Critics Association Award for Best Actress; Nominated—Washington D.C. Area Film Critics Association Award for Best Actress; Días de Cine Awards for Best Actress
2016	Marie and the Misfits	Sébastien Betbeder	
2016	Lost in Paris	Dominique Abel and Fiona Gordon	
2017	La Sainte Famille	Marion Sarraut	

== Bibliography ==
- Riva, Emmanuelle (1975). Le Feu des miroirs (in French). Paris: Éditions Saint-Germain-des-Prés.
- Riva, Emmanuelle (1976). Juste derrière le sifflet des trains (in French). Paris: Éditions Saint-Germain-des-Prés. ISBN 2-243-00380-5.
- Riva, Emmanuelle (1982). L'otage du désir (in French). Paris: Nouvelles Éditions latines. ISBN 2-7233-0184-2.
- Riva, Emmanuelle (2008). Hiroshima 1958 (in Japanese). Tokyo: Inscript. ISBN 978-4-900997-22-6.
- Riva, Emmanuelle (2009). Tu n'as rien vu à Hiroshima (in French). Paris: Gallimard. ISBN 978-2-07-012298-1.

== See also ==
- List of oldest and youngest Academy Award winners and nominees
