= Bérangère McNeese =

Belgian and American actress, screenwriter and filmmaker (born 1989)

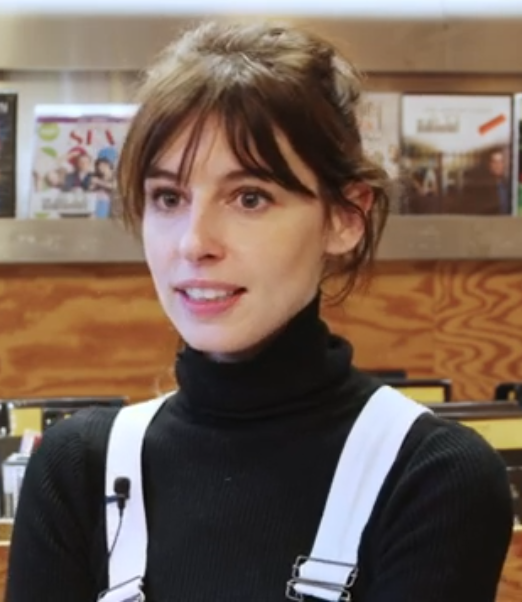
- In a 2023 interview
- Born: March 15, 1989 (age 37); Brussels, Belgium
- Citizenship: Belgium, United States
- Occupations: Actress, film director
- Years active: 2007–present

Bérangère McNeese (born March 15, 1989) is a Belgian and American actress, screenwriter, and filmmaker.

== Biography ==
Bérangère McNeese was born in Brussels to a Belgian mother and an American father. As she says in interviews, she spent half of her childhood in Kentucky and absorbed both cultures. She studied acting in Paris and journalism both in Paris and Brussels.

She started acting as a child, some of her early roles include Danny Boon's daughter in Eyjafjallajokull and Zabou Breitman’s daughter in Belle comme la femme d’un autre. She then starts appearing onscreen more and more, starring in Alain Tasma's TV series The Rape and played in various TV projects such as Le roi de la vanne (Canal+), or Like Moi (France Televisions). In 2022, she undertook the lead role of Linda in TV series, Good People (Des gens bien) on Arte, which won the Grand Prix for best series at the Festival TV de Luchon in 2023. She stars in the show Ganglands on Netflix, and is also one of the lead characters in the Canal+ series Terminal in 2024. She is the current voice of Smurfette in the rebooted series The Smurfs, and plays Daphné Forestier in the hit series HPI, which has broken audience records in France and been adapted in numerous countries since its first season launch in 2021.

In 2024, she is nominated for a Magritte Award for Best Promising actress, for her role in Ailleurs si j'y suis, directed by Francois Pirot.

Her first directing experience, a short film Le Sommeil des Amazones (The sleep of the amazons), was shot and released in 2015. It was followed by Pure Bodies, co-created with Guillaume de Ginestel. In 2019, she released her third short, Matriochkas. The movie was well received by critics and won numerous awards, including the Best Fiction Short Award at the 10th Magritte Awards. three prizes at the Brussels Short Film Festival, the Grand Prix in Palm Springs, best director at Rhode Island International Film Festival, etc. It was broadcast by Arte, TV5Monde and RTBF.

Her upcoming feature film, Les filles du ciel, is scheduled for release in 2025. The feature is produced by Paprika Films and Kwassa Films with the support of Creative Europe Media.
