= Good People (Belgian TV series) =

Belgian television crime drama series

- Series poster
- Genre: Crime drama, comedy
- Created by: Stéphane Bergmans; Matthieu Donck; Benjamin d'Aoust
- Written by: Stéphane Bergmans; Matthieu Donck; Benjamin d'Aoust
- Directed by: Stéphane Bergmans; Matthieu Donck; Benjamin d'Aoust
- Starring: Lucas Meister; Bérangère McNeese; Peter Van Den Begin; Jean-François Gallotte; Gwen Berrou; Dominique Pinon; India Hair; Julie Duclos
- Music by: Eloi Ragot
- Countries of origin: Belgium, France
- Original language: French
- No. of seasons: 1
- No. of episodes: 6

Production
- Cinematography: Florian Berutti
- Running time: 52 min
- Production companies: Helicotronc; RTBF; Arte; Unité; Proximus

Original release
- Network: La Une
- Release: 23 October 2022

Good People (French: Des gens bien) is a 2022 Belgian television crime drama, comedy series. Its six episodes were broadcast from 23 October 2022 on La Une. It was created, written and directed by Stéphane Bergmans, Matthieu Donck and Benjamin d'Aoust. It was produced by Helicotronc, RTBF, Arte, Unité and Proximus. Action is set in mid-2022 in the fictitious border towns of Juvin (Belgium) and Ressac (France), and the surrounding areas. Good People stars Lucas Meister as a policeman, Tom who stages a car accident, which supposedly killed his wife, Linda (Bérangère McNeese). It was broadcast in France via Arte and streamed in Australia on SBS-TV's On Demand from 13 April 2023. The series won the Grand Prix for TV series at the Luchon TV Festival 2023. In late April 2023 series creators Donck, Bergmans and d'Aoust confirmed that a second season was being prepared.

== Premise ==
Tom and Linda live in the small Belgian town of Juvin. Tom's a policeman and Linda runs a tanning salon. They struggle financially and have missed loan repayments. Linda wants to improve her business. While drunk, Linda practices archery and inadvertently kills Carole, an apparently homeless woman, with an arrow. To dispose of Carole's corpse and solve their financial worries, Tom and Linda stage a single vehicle collision. They choose a dangerous stretch of road in France's nearby Ressac region. The couple enlist Linda's criminal cousin, Serge to assist. Carole's corpse is placed in their car's front passenger seat, Tom pushes it down a ravine and then sets it alight. Linda hides out in Tom's sister, Corinne's cabin. Meanwhile Tom deceives people into believing that Linda accidentally died.

Tom waits to collect Linda's life insurance payout. His most ardent supporters are Ressac's police major, Roger and evangelical church leader, Pastor Bruno. Linda's former lover, Phillippe becomes suspicious of Tom, but cannot convince his colleague Stéphane or their boss Roger that Tom killed Linda. Tom's colleague Joseph hungers for an exciting case instead of mundane speed cameras. Local wastrel and drug-user Pierrot reports his girlfriend, Carole's kidnapping by "snake man". Initially, Joseph dismisses Pierrot's claims as drug-related delusions. Roger determines "Linda"'s death was accidental – no autopsy. Tom has the corpse quickly cremated. Phillippe follows Tom to the cabin, where he sees Linda alive, but Phillippe has a heart attack and dies. Serge discovers Phillippe's corpse and shifts it into the man's car, placing heart pills next to it.

== Cast and characters ==
- Lucas Meister as Tom Leroy: Juvin policeman, Linda's husband
- Bérangère McNeese as Linda Vandersteen Leroy: Juvin resident, beautician, Tom's wife, archery enthusiast
- Peter Van Den Begin as Serge Vandersteen: Linda's cousin; paroled criminal
- Jean-François Gallotte as Pasteur Bruno (English: Pastor Bruno): Ressac's Evangelical Protestant Church's priest
- Gwen Berrou as Corinne Leroy: Tom's widowed sister, evangelical Christian
- Dominique Pinon as Roger Rabet: Ressac police Major, Tom's supporter
- India Hair as Stéphane Foumara: Ressac policewoman, Phillippe's partner, Roger's subordinate, Cathy's former lover
- Julie Duclos as Sylvie Martin: Philippe's pregnant wife
- Marie-Luc Adam as Paroissienne 1 (English: "Parishioner 1"): Corinne's fellow evangelist
- Mona Lederman as Carole d'Acoz: Pierrot's girlfriend, worships Anubis, drug-user, arsonist, Queen Mathilde's cousin
- Michaël Abiteboul as Philippe Blanquart: Ressac policeman, Sylvie's husband, Stéphane's colleague, archery enthusiast, Linda's lover
- Nicolas Buysse as Joseph Gobelet: Juvin policeman, Tom's colleague
- Eline Schumacher as Patricia Gamas: Ressac policewoman, Tom's former lover
- Ferdinand Niquet-Rioux as Pierrot: wastrel, drug-user, worships Anubis, drug-user, arsonist, Carole's boyfriend
- Catherine Decrolier as Paroisienne 2 (English: "Parishioner 2"): Corinne's fellow evangelist
- Jérémy Zagba as Hervé: Ressac policeman, expert in innovative questioning device
- Lucile Vignolles as Cathy Mansard: insurance assessor, Sylvie's cousin, Stéphane's former lover
- Corinne Masiero as Cheffe de gare (English: "Station Master"): Juvin train station master

== Episode guide ==
| No. in season | Title | Directed by | Written by | Original release date |
|---|---|---|---|---|
| 1 | "Episode 1" (Épisode 1) | Stéphane Bergmans, Matthieu Donck, Benjamin d'Aoust | Stéphane Bergmans, Matthieu Donck, Benjamin d'Aoust | 23 October 2022 |
Tom pushes car downhill; woman in passenger seat. He enters car, stages head wound. Tom's breathalsed. Tom: avoiding wild boar caused collision. Flashback: Tom starts fire. Present: Roger concludes Linda died accidentally; no autopsy. Stéphane describes car accident to Phillippe. At hospital, they have Tom sign his statement. Nurse changes Tom's bandages. Phillippe puzzled by Tom's emotionless responses. Phillippe views corpse. Roger disparages Hervé's questioning device. Roger dismisses Phillippe's concern over Tom's anomalous burns: only on palms. Roger assigns burned farm case to Phillippe, Stéphane. Tom phones accomplice. Stéphane to farmer: contact Belgian police, not French. Phillippe to Stéphane: he slept with Linda. Stéphane: do not investigate further; care for Sylvie. Sylvie lunches with Cathy. Tom asks to see manager. Phillippe to Roger: passenger did not wear seat belt; must reopen case. Stéphane reveals Phillippe's affair. Roger puts Phillippe on leave. Tom scrubs floor. Phillippe visualises Tom burning Linda, alive. Phillippe asks coroner to prepare autopsy, but corpse already released. Stéphane refuses to assist Phillippe stop funeral. Phillippe attends funeral; corpse cremated. Phillippe overhears Tom and Serge argue over payment. Phillippe follows Tom, who leaves church with ashes. Tom travels to forest cabin; Linda greets Tom. Phillippe has heart attack, dies.
| 2 | "Episode 2" (Épisode 2) | Stéphane Bergmans, Matthieu Donck, Benjamin d'Aoust | Stéphane Bergmans, Matthieu Donck, Benjamin d'Aoust | 23 October 2022 |
Month earlier: Tom and Linda attend church when Corinne's baptised by Bruno. Linda promotes her salon; Tom uncomfortable with church members. Drunken Linda causes embarrassment with impromptu speech. Tom shepherds Linda offstage; Linda vomits. Tom and Joseph have lunch alongside speed camera. Linda's salon loses money. Serge asks for job; claims to be clean. Linda's defaulted on loan payments, but asks for another load. Banker refuses, initiates enforced recovery to sell their assets. Linda practices archery while railing against Banker. They are financially desperate. Tom convinces Corinne to ask church members to invest in Linda's salon. Tom and Linda attend church function to pitch their proposal to parishioners. Linda, Corinne pray for success. Pierrot and Carole start fire in farmer's field. Tom, Joseph ignore fire report. Linda uses investments to purchase tanning beds. Parishioners arrive as salon customers. Serge pressures Linda for work. Tom, Linda celebrate salon's improved turnover. Tom and Linda have sex in car. Bank impounds Linda's new beds. Linda meets Phillippe. Pierrot, Carole light another fire. Farmer shoots rifle over their heads, they runoff and are separated. Linda gets drunk; Tom sleeps. Linda shoots arrows at tree target. Linda misses target, arrow hits Carole, who dies.
| 3 | "Episode 3" (Épisode 3) | Stéphane Bergmans, Matthieu Donck, Benjamin d'Aoust | Stéphane Bergmans, Matthieu Donck, Benjamin d'Aoust | 30 October 2022 |
Corpse in garage, Linda cannot remove arrow. Linda: insurance scam for €400,000. Linda displays Carole's corpse to Tom. Rather than lose parole, Serge claims to work for Linda. Serge sees corpse. Serge attacks Tom until Linda divulges scam. Joseph collects Tom for work. Serge looks for Carole's missing shoe. Pierrot wakes; finds Carole's shoe; phones her. Serge discovers Carole's phone; hears Pierrot calling. Serge knocks Pierrot out and takes shoe. Joseph, Tom set up speed camera. Linda reviews Roger's accident report. Linda devises accident plan: use same place Roger's wife died. Flashback: Doctor: Linda cannot have child. Two Days Before Accident: Tom to Serge: abandon Carole's phone on train. Serge speeds past Joseph. Serge questions "Station Master". Serge enters train, then leaves. Patricia observes Tom scouting crash scene. Next day: While shopping for supplies Tom, Linda encounter Corinne, Bruno. Tom, Linda stock Corinne's cabin ahead of Linda's stay. Accident day: Tom, Linda attend church. Serge places Carole's corpse in car boot. Tom, Linda celebrate anniversary at French restaurant. At ravine, Tom, Serge transfer corpse to Tom's car. Serge drives Linda away. Tom stages accident; pushes car down ravine. Pierrot reports Carole's kidnapping to Joseph. Tom sets car alight.
| 4 | "Episode 4" (Épisode 4) | Stéphane Bergmans, Matthieu Donck, Benjamin d'Aoust | Stéphane Bergmans, Matthieu Donck, Benjamin d'Aoust | 30 October 2022 |
Serge discovers Phillippe's corpse; drags it away. Female jogger finds corpse in car. Corinne surmises Tom's drinking excessively; Tom should attend church. Serge wants to hideout at cabin. Stéphane attends Phillippe's corpse, recalls Tom's collision. Stéphane shows Phillippe's pills to Roger. Stéphane informs Sylvie: Phillippe's dead. Sylvie: Phillippe irregularly took medication. Stéphane to Cathy: pathologist confirms heart attack. At work, Tom steals passports. Joseph to Tom: Pierrot's girlfriend, Carole vanished near Tom's place. Pierrot reported "snake man" kidnapped Carole. Tom delays processing Carole's case. Tom videophones Linda: Carole's missing; berates Linda for allowing Serge to stay. Tom books tickets to Thailand. Patricia asks Tom to resume sexual relationship. Cathy consoles Sylvie; reads police file on Tom. Corinne and Bruno to Tom: use Linda's death to get ravine road fixed; prevent similar accidents. Tom breaks into Linda's workplace, collects hidden money. Tom to Cathy: unsure whether to sell. Cathy asks boss for Tom's claim file. Cathy to Stéphane: Phillippe was right, Tom killed Linda. Stéphane: Phillippe had affair with Linda. At Tom's, Corinne overhears Patricia profess her love for Tom; sees Patricia enter. Superintendent Gobert orders Joseph: find Carole before press learn. Patricia tries seducing Tom. Joseph to Tom: Carole's Queen's cousin.
| 5 | "Episode 5" (Épisode 5) | Stéphane Bergmans, Matthieu Donck, Benjamin d'Aoust | Stéphane Bergmans, Matthieu Donck, Benjamin d'Aoust | 6 November 2022 |
Patricia sleeps on Tom's couch. He orders Patricia to leave. Joseph to Tom: promoted if we find Carole. Tom, Joseph meet "Carole's father", search must be kept discreet. Stéphane, Cathy meet former accident assessor, Michel, at ravine. Using Stéphane's van, Michel tries recreating Tom's accident. Michel: situation does not fit testimony. Pierrot leads Joseph, Tom along path. Patricia trawls through Tom's place. Serge doubts Tom's loyalty. Pierrot recalls "snake man" taking Carole's shoe, phone. Joseph finds "snake man"'s button. Tom phones Linda: Carole's queen's cousin; warns: keep Serge quiet. Serge drives off. Pierrot testimony generates "snake man" identikit. Tom interviews "Station Master". Tom lies: she saw Carole board train. Michel analyses car wreck: vehicle was pushed. Joseph: Carole's phone pinged at Maastricht. Tom fills his car; sees Serge drive past. Patricia posts sexy selfies to Tom. Serge sees Patricia in lingerie at Tom's home. Roger campaigns for ravine guardrail. Cathy uses area map to show Tom's timeline has gap. Patricia: Tom scouted ravine road before accident. Stéphane, Cathy present timeline anomaly to Roger. Serge to Linda: Tom's screwing another woman. Linda accuses Tom of having lover. Tom promises Linda: he's on his way. Roger brings Tom in for questioning.
| 6 | "Episode 1" (Épisode 1) | Stéphane Bergmans, Matthieu Donck, Benjamin d'Aoust | Stéphane Bergmans, Matthieu Donck, Benjamin d'Aoust | 6 November 2022 |
Linda tries calling Tom. Tom denies insurance fraud. Roger: car was pushed into ravine, set alight. Tom asserts it was accidental. Tom agrees to submit to Hervé's questioning device. Parishioner tells Bruno: Tom arrested. News reporter: Tom questioned over Linda's death. Sylvie's waters break. Hervé connects Tom, who displays emotional readings even telling truth. Tom relates details of accident night; his readings are wild. Joseph arrests Pierrot for arson. Pierrot points to "snake man" in Serge's speed camera photo. Stéphane accuses Tom of killing Phillippe. Tom: knew about affair, but did not kill Linda. Questioning device: Tom told truth. Serge, Linda arrive at home: Tom's gone. Bruno, parishioners at police station. Policeman refuses their entry. Tom explains time gap: they had sex in carpark. Serge goes off after Tom. Patricia: saw Tom's car that night. Sylvie has baby. Bruno, parishioners cheer Tom's release. Corinne sees Patricia's policewoman. Patricia threatens to reveal Tom. At home, Tom argues with Linda. Corinne arrives, accuses Tom of killing Linda. Corinne sees Linda. Corinne falls backwards on coat spike, dies. Tom runs off. Stéphane to Cathy: Tom has alibi. Joseph learns Serge's identity: convicted murderer, who's related to Linda, Tom's wife. Linda wails for Tom.
