= Bye Bye Germany =

2017 film by Sam Garbarski

- Directed by: Sam Garbarski
- Starring: Moritz Bleibtreu; Antje Traue
- Distributed by: X Verleih AG (though Warner Bros.) (Germany)
- Release date: 10 February 2017 (BIFF)
- Running time: 102 minutes
- Countries: Germany; Belgium; Luxembourg
- Languages: German; English

Bye Bye Germany (German: Es war einmal in Deutschland...) is a 2017 internationally co-produced comedy film directed by Sam Garbarski.

== Cast ==
- Moritz Bleibtreu as David Bermann
- Antje Traue as Special Agent Sara Simon
- Tim Seyfi as Fajnbrot
- Mark Ivanir as Holzmann
- Anatole Taubman as Fränkel
- Hans Löw as Verständig
- Pál Mácsai as Szoros
- Tania Garbarski as Sonia

== Plot ==
Having survived the war and everything the Third Reich wanted to throw at them, David Bermann and his friends have only one plan in mind: to get to the States as soon as possible. But for that, they need money. Just when this design seems almost within his grasp, David gets fleeced of all his savings —and, all the dodgy shenanigans in his past finally catch up with him!

== Reception ==
On review aggregator website Rotten Tomatoes, the film holds an approval rating of 90%, based on 21 reviews, and an average rating of 7.5/10. On Metacritic, the film has a weighted average rating of 65 out of 100, based on 7 critics, indicating "generally favorable reviews".

== Accolades ==
Award / Film Festival	Category	Recipients and nominees	Result
Magritte Awards	Best Screenplay	Sam Garbarski	Nominated
Magritte Awards	Best Supporting Actress	Tania Garbarski	Nominated
Magritte Awards	Best Production Design	Véronique Sacrez	Nominated
Magritte Awards	Best Costume Design	Nathalie Leborgne	Won
Norwegian International Film Festival	Best Film		Won
RiverRun International Film Festival	Audience Award		Won
