= Eldorado (2008 film) =

2008 Belgian film by Bouli Lanners

- Theatrical release poster
- Directed by: Bouli Lanners
- Written by: Bouli Lanners
- Produced by: Jacques-Henri Bronckart
- Starring: Bouli Lanners; Fabrice Adde; Philippe Nahon
- Cinematography: Jean-Paul De Zaeytijd
- Edited by: Ewin Ryckaert
- Music by: Koen Gisen; Renaud Mayeur; An Pierlé
- Release dates: 18 May 2008 (Cannes Film Festival); 4 June 2008 (Belgium); 18 June 2008 (France)
- Running time: 80 minutes
- Country: Belgium
- Language: French
- Box office: $1.1 million

Eldorado is a 2008 Belgian absurdist road tragicomedy film directed by Bouli Lanners and selected for the Directors’ Fortnight (40th anniversary) 61st Cannes Film Festival 2008. The film received the André Cavens Award for Best Film by the Belgian Film Critics Association (UCC). It was the official entry from Belgium for the 81st Academy Awards, but was not chosen as one of the films to be nominated during the ceremony.

It was filmed in Wallonia.

It had the working title California Carwash and was based on an incident from Lanners's past.

== Plot ==
Yvan (Bouli Lanners), a used car salesman, comes home late one evening to his house in the Belgian countryside. He discovers that a burglar (Fabrice) has just broken into his house and is hiding under his bed. When the burglar tries to escape, Yvan knocks him over by throwing a metal pipe at him. Upon confronting him, he discovers that the burglar is a young man in need of money to fuel his drug addiction. Yvan decides to help this young man, who says his names is Elie, by not turning him over to the police and by giving him a little money for the road. Finally, out of pity and remembering his own brother who had died of an overdose, Yvan decides to drive Elie, at his request, to the home of his parents in southern Belgium. Thus begins a journey across Wallonia, on which they face unsettling encounters with random people and humorous situations.

== Cast ==
- Bouli Lanners : Yvan
- Fabrice Adde : Elie/Didier
- Philippe Nahon : The collector
- Françoise Chichéry : Elie's mother
- Didier Toupy : The naturist Alain Delon
- Stefan Liberski : A mechanic
- Baptiste Isaïa : Another mechanic
- Jean-Jacques Rausin : A biker
- Renaud Rutten : Another biker
- Jean-Luc Meekers : The car distributor

== Reception ==
On the review aggregator website Rotten Tomatoes, 69% of 16 critics' reviews are positive, with an average rating of 6.2/10.

=== Analysis ===
Eldorado is a burlesque and melancholic road movie in the tradition of the absurd and Belgian surrealism, which depicts (Bouli Lanners was a painter before making films), through saturated colors, CinemaScope format images, a modern western using many lateral tracking shots and situational gags depicting an intense relationship between two men lost in their respective lives and doomed to an inevitably dark end.

== Accolades ==
=== Won ===
Belgian Film Critics Association (UCC)

- Best Film

Cannes Film Festival

- Label Europe Cinemas
- Regards Jeune prize
- FIPRESCI prize

=== Nominated ===
Gijón International Film Festival

- Best Film

Filmfest Hamburg

- Art Cinema award
- Young Talent award

César Awards

- Best Foreign Film (lost to Waltz with Bashir)

Filmfare Awards

- Best Foreign film

Cannes Film Festival

- C.I.C.A.E. award
