= Médée (2001 film) =

2001 film

- Based on: Medea play by Euripides
- Written by: Myrto Gondicas (translation); Pierre Judet de la Combe (translation)
- Directed by: Don Kent
- Starring: Isabelle Huppert
- Country of origin: France
- Original language: French

Original release
- Release: 20 February 2001

Médée is a 2001 French television tragedy film directed by Don Kent. The film stars Isabelle Huppert with Emmanuelle Riva as chorus. It is based upon the play, Medea, by Euripides.

Huppert had already played Medea on stage, in Avignon and Paris, and would go on to play the role again in Tonino de Bernardi's modern version of the myth, Medea Miracle.

== Cast ==
- Isabelle Huppert as Médée
- Pierre Barrat as Créon
- Jean-Quentin Châtelain as Jason
- Jean-Philippe Puymartin as Egée
- Emmanuelle Riva as The chorus
- Anne Benoît as The nanny
- Michel Peyrelon as The pedagogue
- Pascal Tokatlian as The servant
