= Bony King =

Belgian singer-songwriter

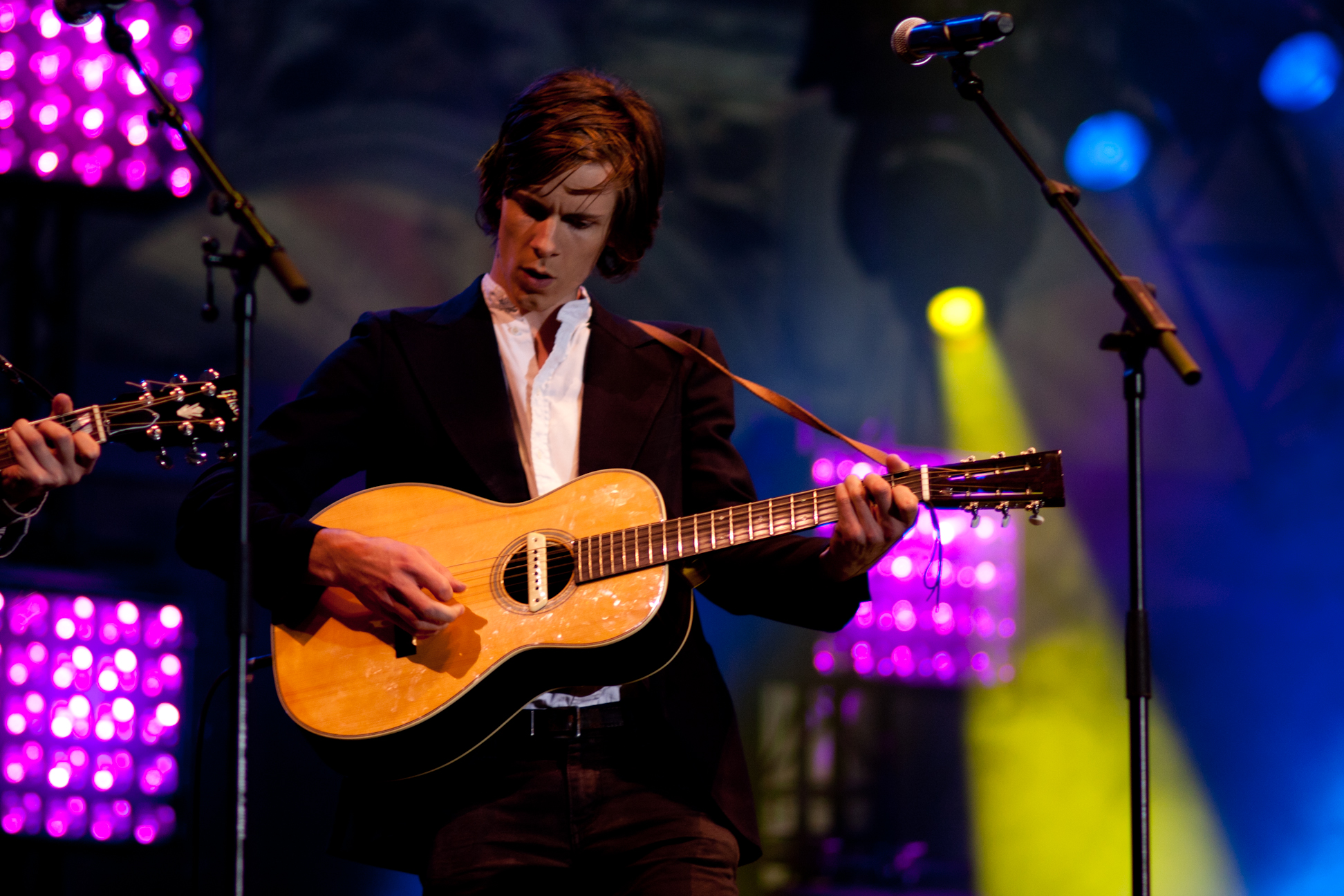

Background information
- Birth name: Bram Vanparys
- Origin: Ghent, Belgium
- Genres: Pop
- Occupation(s): Singer-songwriter, musician
- Instrument(s): Vocals, guitar

Bram Vanparys, known by his stage name Bony King or The Bony King of Nowhere, is a Belgian singer-songwriter.

== Biography ==
Vanparys made his debut under the nickname The Bony King of Nowhere, possibly a reference to either the Radiohead song There, There (from their 2003 album Hail to the Thief) or the children's program Bagpuss. He featured twice at Pukkelpop, and once at Folk Dranouter. He wrote the title track for the film 22 mei by Koen Mortier and the film music for The Giants by Bouli Lanners. In 2015 he simplified his nickname to Bony King. That year he also brought out the album Wild Flowers.

== Discography ==
=== Albums ===
Album(s) with hits in the Flemish Ultratop 50	Date of appearance	Date of entrance	Highest position	Number of weeks	Remarks
Alas my love	23 February 2009	28 February 2009	9	17	as The Bony King of Nowhere
Eleonore	11 February 2011	19 February 2011	10	14	as The Bony King of Nowhere
The Bony King of Nowhere	22 October 2012	27 October 2012	19	19	as The Bony King of Nowhere
Wild flowers	16 March 2015	28 March 2015	28	24	
Silent Days	21 September 2018	--	--	--	as The Bony King of Nowhere
Everybody Knows	02 Fevrier 2024	--	--	--	as The Bony King of Nowhere

=== Singles ===
Single(s) with hits in the Flemish Ultratop 50	Date of appearance	Date of entrance	Highest position	Number of weeks	Remarks
Taxidream	2009	13 June 2009	tip23	-	as The Bony King of Nowhere
Eleonore	31 January 2011	5 March 2011	tip22	-	as The Bony King of Nowhere
Girl from the play	30 January 2012	18 February 2012	tip60	-	as The Bony King of Nowhere
Travelling man	2012	27 October 2012	tip64	-	as The Bony King of Nowhere
