= Let My People Go! (2011 film) =

- Directed by: Mikael Buch
- Produced by: Philippe Martin; Geraldine Michelot
- Starring: Nicolas Maury; Carmen Maura
- Cinematography: Celine Bozon
- Edited by: Simon Jacquet
- Production company: Les Films Pelleas
- Distributed by: Les Films du Losange and Zeitgeist Films
- Release dates: 22 August 2011 (Montreal World Film Festival); 28 December 2011 (France)
- Running time: 86 minutes
- Countries: Finland; France
- Language: French

Let My People Go! is a 2011 film directed by Mikael Buch. It premiered at the 2011 Montreal World Film Festival and was released in December 2011 in France. It was released in the United States in 2013 by Zeitgeist Films and grossed $18,529 domestically.

== Synopsis ==
Ruben is a French-Jewish gay mailman who lives in fairytale Finland (where he got his MA in "Comparative Sauna Cultures") with his gorgeous Nordic boyfriend, Teemu. Just before Passover, a series of mishaps and a lovers' quarrel exile the heartbroken Ruben back to Paris and his zany family.

== Main cast ==
- Nicolas Maury as Ruben
- Carmen Maura as Rachel
- Jean-François Stévenin as Nathan
- Amira Casar as Irène
- Clément Sibony as Samuel
- Jarkko Niemi as Teemu
- Jean-Luc Bideau as Maurice
- Didier Flamand as André
- Kari Väänänen as Monsieur Tilikainen
- Olavi Uusivirta as Fredrik
- Aurore Clément as Françoise
- Michaël Abiteboul as Ézechiel
- Charlie Dupont as Hervé

== Awards ==
- 2012: Philadelphia QFest: Best Comedic Film
- 2012: Asheville QFest: Best Cinematography

== Reception ==
"A fairy-tale romance whose title acknowledges both a saturation in and longing to be free of Jewish cultural baggage, Mikael Buch's Let My People Go! cross-breeds cultures that are rarely paired onscreen. International box-office prospects are fair in urban arthouses, where the presence of Almodóvar collaborator Carmen Maura may tip moviegoers off to the pop-inflected, comic semi-scandals in store." -John DeFore, The Hollywood Reporter
