= The Giants (2011 film) =

- Theatrical release poster
- French: Les géants
- Directed by: Bouli Lanners
- Written by: Bouli Lanners; Elise Ancion
- Produced by: Jacques-Henri Bronckart; Jani Thiltges
- Starring: Zacharie Chasseriaud; Martin Nissen; Paul Bartel
- Cinematography: Jean-Paul De Zaeytijd
- Edited by: Ewin Ryckaert
- Music by: Bram Van Parys
- Distributed by: O'Brother Distribution
- Release dates: 20 May 2011 (Cannes Film Festival); 12 October 2011 (Belgium)
- Running time: 84 minutes
- Country: Belgium
- Language: French

The Giants (French: Les géants) is a 2011 Belgian drama film directed by Bouli Lanners, written by Lanners and Elise Ancion, starring Zacharie Chasseriaud, Martin Nissen, Paul Bartel, Didier Toupy, Karim Leklou, Marthe Keller and Gwen Berrou. Shot in the Ardennes in Belgium and Luxembourg, produced by Jacques-Henri Bronckart and Jani Thiltges for Versus Production, it was released in Belgium on 12 October 2011.

The Giants had its world premiere in the Directors' Fortnight at the 2011 Cannes Film Festival on May 20, where it won the SACD Prize and the Art Cinema Award. It has received high praise from film critics and is considered one of the best Belgian films of that year, winning five Magritte Awards, including Best Film and Best Director.

== Plot ==
Abandoned at their late grandfather's house for the summer, teenage brothers Zak and Seth are left to their own devices. With the endless possibilities of summer fun and adventure to be had in the idyllic Belgian countryside, they feel the world is their oyster. But when money runs short and with no help in sight, the boys scheme to support themselves by renting their deceased grandfather's house to a local drug dealer, but things don't go exactly as planned.

== Cast ==
- Zacharie Chasseriaud as Zak
- Martin Nissen as Seth
- Paul Bartel as Danny
- Didier Toupy as the dealer
- Karim Leklou as Angel
- Marthe Keller as Rosa
- Gwen Berrou as Marth

== Release ==
The film premiered on 20 May in the Directors' Fortnight at the 2011 Cannes Film Festival. The film was subsequently screened at various film festivals, including Festival International du Film Francophone de Namur and BFI London Film Festival, and premiered in the United States at the Santa Barbara International Film Festival on January 27 2011. The Belgian regular release was on 12 October 2011 through O'Brother Distribution. Haut et Court bought the distribution rights for France and Eye Film Instituut bought the Dutch distribution. The film was released in France on 2 November 2011 and in the Netherlands on 26 January 2012. As of November 6, 2011, The Giants has grossed $211,657 in Belgium and $119,816 in France. Following its wins at the 2nd Magritte Awards, it was announced O’Brother Distribution would re-release the film in Belgium on 8 February 2012.

The Giants was released on DVD on 7 March 2012 in France. The home edition contains a making-of and a music video for the theme song "The Bony King of Nowhere" by Bram Vanparys.

== Accolades ==
Award	Category	Recipient(s)	Result	Ref.
Angoulême Francophone Film Fest	Best Film	Bouli Lanners	Nominated	
Angoulême Francophone Film Fest	Valois Magelis	Bouli Lanners	Nominated	
Cannes Film Festival	SACD Prize	Bouli Lanners	Won	
Cannes Film Festival	Label Europa Cinemas Prize	Bouli Lanners	Nominated	
Cannes Film Festival	Art Cinema Award	Bouli Lanners	Won	
Châtenay-Malabry Film Festival	Best Film	Bouli Lanners	Nominated	
Châtenay-Malabry Film Festival	Prix du Développement Durable	Bouli Lanners	Nominated	
Châtenay-Malabry Film Festival	Award of the Youth	Bouli Lanners	Won	
Châtenay-Malabry Film Festival	Audience Award	Bouli Lanners	Nominated	
Chicago International Film Festival	Best Film	Bouli Lanners	Nominated	
Dieppe International Film Festival	Best Film	Bouli Lanners	Won	
Festival International du Film Francophone de Namur	Best Film	Bouli Lanners	Nominated	
Festival International du Film Francophone de Namur	Best Cinematography	Jean-Paul De Zaeytijd	Won	
Festival International du Film Francophone de Namur	Best Actor	Zacharie Chasseriaud, Martin Nissen, Paul Bartel	Won	
Festival International du Film Francophone de Namur	Best Actress	Marthe Keller	Nominated	
Lumière Awards	Best French-Language Film	Bouli Lanners	Nominated	
Magritte Award	Best Film	Bouli Lanners	Won	
Magritte Award	Best Director	Bouli Lanners	Won	
Magritte Award	Best Screenplay	Bouli Lanners, Elise Ancion	Nominated	
Magritte Award	Best Supporting Actor	Didier Toupy	Nominated	
Magritte Award	Best Supporting Actress	Gwen Berrou	Won	
Magritte Award	Most Promising Actor	Martin Nissen	Nominated	
Magritte Award	Best Cinematography	Jean-Paul De Zaeytijd	Won	
Magritte Award	Best Sound	Marc Bastien, Thomas Gauder	Nominated	
Magritte Award	Best Production Design	Paul Rouschop	Nominated	
Magritte Award	Best Costume Design	Elise Ancion	Nominated	
Magritte Award	Best Original Score	Bram Van Parys	Won	
Magritte Award	Best Editing	Ewin Ryckaert	Nominated	
