= Lost in Paris =

- Theatrical release poster
- Paris pieds nus
- Directed by: Dominique Abel; Fiona Gordon
- Written by: Dominique Abel; Fiona Gordon
- Produced by: Dominique Abel; Fiona Gordon; Christie Molia; Charles Gillibert
- Starring: Dominique Abel; Fiona Gordon; Emmanuelle Riva; Pierre Richard
- Cinematography: Claire Childéric; Jean-Christophe Leforestier
- Edited by: Sandrine Deegen
- Production companies: Courage mon amour Moteur S'il Vous Plaît Production; CG Cinéma
- Distributed by: Potemkine Films (France)
- Release dates: 2 September 2016 (Telluride); 8 March 2017 (France); 15 March 2017 (Belgium)
- Running time: 83 minutes
- Countries: France; Belgium
- Languages: French; English

Lost in Paris (original title: Paris pieds nus) is a 2016 French-Belgian comedy film written, directed and co-produced by Dominique Abel and Fiona Gordon, starring Gordon as a Canadian librarian who meets a homeless man (played by Abel) in Paris. The film also features Emmanuelle Riva and Pierre Richard. The film had its world premiere at the Telluride Film Festival on 2 September 2016. It received three nominations at the 8th Magritte Awards, including Best Film, and won Best Editing for Sandrine Deegen.

== Plot ==
When she is a little girl Fiona's (Fiona Gordon) aunt Martha moves from a little village in Canada to Paris.

Years later, Fiona receives a letter from her aunt Martha which asks her to come to Paris to help her since she is about to be forced into an old age home since she is 88.

Fiona arrives in Paris only to find her aunt missing. Posing for a photo near the Eiffel Tower she falls into the Seine and loses her backpack and belongings. The backpack is found by Dom (Dominique Abel) who lives in a tent by the river. He uses Fiona's money to treat himself to dinner at an expensive restaurant where he runs into Fiona. The two dance and he offers to walk her home. While he is paying Fiona notices that he is wearing her purse and confronts him. He runs away from her and she falls in the Seine a second time.

Dom realizes he is in love with Fiona and returns her backpack to the Canadian embassy where she retrieves it. She goes in search of her aunt, but is told she is dead and the funeral is happening that day. She goes to the funeral, Dom following behind. When they arrive they are asked to give a eulogy and Dom does, despite not knowing aunt Martha, at first saying generic pleasantries before giving an impassioned speech that Martha was a secret racist who hated badly dressed people as well as the homeless. During the reception Fiona realizes that she is at the funeral of Marthe, her aunt's friend. Going to the coffin to check on the body, Dom accidentally gets his tie caught in the coffin lid, and Fiona gets her nose stuck in the elevator trying to help him. When she is revived she is handed an urn containing the remains of Marthe, which she thinks also includes Dom's ashes. In reality Dom is fine, though when Fiona learns this she slaps him angrily.

Meanwhile, Martha has been on the run from nurses from a retirement home that keep visiting her, hoping to persuade her to move in. She crosses paths with Dom several times and nearly crosses paths with Fiona. After Fiona slaps him Dom goes home to his tent and gets drunk, running into Martha who is hiding out in that location. He offers her some of his champagne.

Later that night Fiona falls asleep in Martha's apartment, while Dom falls asleep in his tent with Martha. Dom and Fiona have an erotic dream about each other, leading Dom to have sex with Martha. Afterwards, Martha goes outside and retrieves Fiona's phone from a garbage bin. The two call each other and briefly connect, with Martha saying she has been drinking champagne in New York while sleeping with an attractive man. Fiona puts the clues together to find that Martha is on Île aux Cygnes near the replica of the Statue of Liberty. Arriving and seeing Dom, she realizes that he and her aunt had sex, but asks him to help her find her aunt. He has his dog pick up her scent which leads them to the Eiffel Tower.

Fiona and Dom climb up the Eiffel Tower where they find Martha asleep in a satellite dish. The three pause and admire the view of the city before Martha dies.

After her cremation a small ceremony with Fiona and Dom is held at Île aux Cygnes before they throw her ashes in the Seine. Fiona then reveals that she always intended to learn French and asks Dom if he will help her. He agrees.

== Cast ==
- Fiona Gordon as Fiona
  - Emmy Boissard Paumelle as young Fiona
- Dominique Abel as Dom
- Emmanuelle Riva as Martha
  - Céline Laurentie as young Martha
- Pierre Richard as Norman
- Charlotte Dubery as the reader
- Frédéric Meert as Bob the Mountie
- Philippe Martz as Martin
- Isabelle de Hertogh as The laundery lover
- Olivier Parenty as Embassy employee

== Reception ==
=== Critical reception ===
On review aggregator website Rotten Tomatoes, the film holds an approval rating of 87% based on 61 reviews, and an average rating of 6.8/10. The website's critical consensus reads, "Lost in Paris is whimsical to a fault, but its fanciful light-heartedness earns the audience's indulgence with charming performances and an infectious absurdity." On Metacritic, the film has a weighted average score of 74 out of 100, based on 14 critics, indicating "generally favorable reviews".

=== Accolades ===
Award / Film Festival	Category	Recipients and nominees	Result
Denver Film Festival	Rare Pearl Award	Lost in Paris	Won
Magritte Award	Best Film	Lost in Paris	Nominated
Magritte Award	Best Actress	Fiona Gordon	Nominated
Magritte Award	Best Editing	Sandrine Deegen	Won
Mill Valley Film Festival	Audience Award (Mind The Gap - Narrative)	Lost in Paris	Won
