= Odd Job (film) =

- Theatrical release poster
- Un petit boulot
- Directed by: Pascal Chaumeil
- Screenplay by: Michel Blanc
- Based on: Since the Layoffs by Iain Levison
- Produced by: Yann Arnaud; Genevieve Lemal
- Starring: Romain Duris; Michel Blanc
- Cinematography: Manuel Dacosse
- Edited by: Sylvie Landra
- Music by: Mathieu Lamboley
- Production companies: Gaumont; Scope Pictures
- Distributed by: Gaumont
- Release dates: 1 August 2016 (Fantasia); 31 August 2016 (France)
- Running time: 100 minutes
- Country: France
- Language: French
- Budget: $8.8 million
- Box office: $3 million

Odd Job (French: Un petit boulot) is a 2016 French comedy film directed by Pascal Chaumeil.

== Plot ==
Jacques lives in a small town where all the inhabitants were put on straw stock following a dismissal. The factory closed, his girlfriend is gone and debts accumulate. So when the Mafia bookmaker corner him, asking him to kill his wife, Jacques gladly accepts.

== Cast ==
- Romain Duris as Jacques
- Michel Blanc as Gardot
- Alice Belaïdi as Anita
- Gustave Kervern as Tom
- Alex Lutz as Brecht
- Charlie Dupont as Jeff
- Patrick Descamps as Walter
- Philippe Grand'Henry as Carl
- Iván Marcos as Jaime
- Thomas Mustin as Mulot
- Gael Soudron as Pierrot
- Carole Trevoux as Katie

== Production ==
This is the last film Pascal Chaumeil directed, before he died on 27 August 2015.
