= Léo Legrand =

French actor

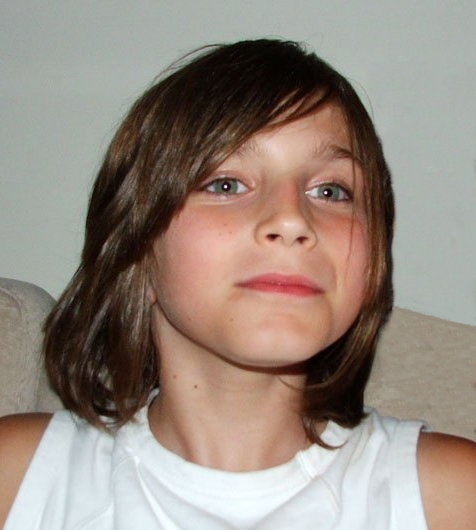
- Léo Legrand in 2008
- Born: 1995 (age 30–31)
- Occupation: Actor

Léo Legrand is a French actor. He is best known for playing the role of Jacquou in Jacquou Le Croquant, Thomas in Trouble at Timpetill and playing the role of Thomas Verniaz in A Distant Neighborhood. The latter film earned him a Young Artist Award nomination in the category of Best Young Performer.

== Filmography ==
=== Film ===
- Tout pour plaire (2005)
- Saison (2005)
- Les Yeux bandés (2006)
- Jacquou le Croquant (2006) as Jacquou
- Trouble at Timpetill (2007) as Thomas
- La Robe du soir (2010) as Antoine
- A Distant Neighborhood (2010) as Thomas
- Mon arbre (2011)
- Cookie (2013) as Benjamin

=== Television ===
- Une famille formidable (2007)
- Adriana et moi (2007)
- Emma (2012) as Vincent
- Disparue (2014) as Romain
- King & Conqueror (2025) as Odo
