= Arnaud Valois =

French actor (born 1984)

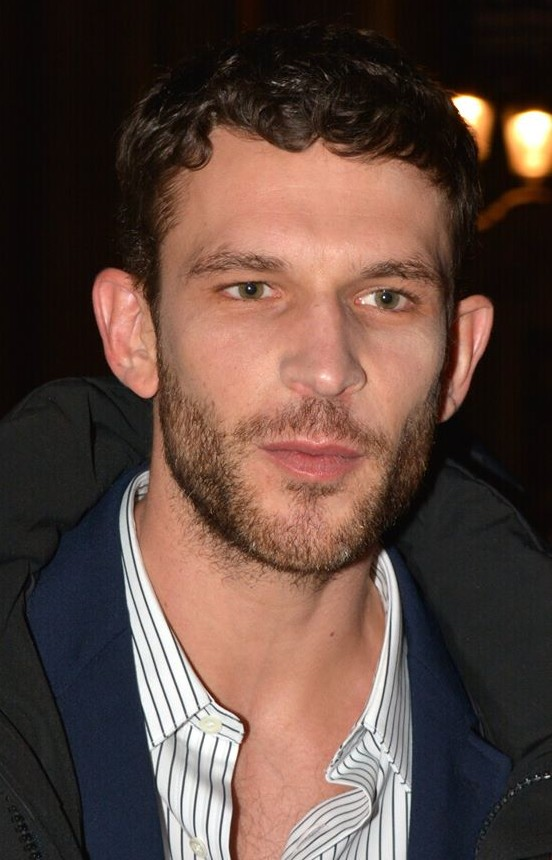
- Born: 29 February 1984 (age 42); Lyon, France
- Occupation: Actor
- Years active: 2004–present

Arnaud Valois (born 29 February 1984) is a French actor who was born in Lyon. He began his career in 2006. He played the protagonist Nathan, in the 2017 film BPM (Beats per Minute) (120 battements par minute).

== Career ==
Valois ceased studies at law school and began to study acting at the Cours Florent drama school for two years. After a series of rejections as an actor, Valois left France and studied massage at Wat Pho in Bangkok and worked as a massage therapist in Thailand for six years. He returned to Paris to open a massage studio. He was invited to act in 120 BPM after Robin Campillo read his Facebook profile.

In 2017, with the international release of 120 BPM, the film's campaign for the 2018 Oscars nominations, and his ability to speak English, he became known internationally. Vanity Fair ranked him as the eleventh most influential French person in the world in 2017.

== Personal life ==
Valois is gay.

== Filmography ==
=== Cinema ===
Year	Title	Role	Director(s)	Notes
2004	Plutôt d'accord	The mute	Christophe & Stephane Botti	Short
2006	Charlie Says	Adrien	Nicole Garcia	
2007	L'application des peines	Hugo	Cyprien Vial	Short
2008	A French Gigolo	Sylvain	Josiane Balasko	
2009	The Girl on the Train	Gabi	André Téchiné	
2011	Eyes Find Eyes	Thomas	Jean-Manuel Fernandez; Sean Price Williams	
2017	BPM (Beats per Minute)	Nathan	Robin Campillo	Lumière Award for Best Male Revelation; Nominated - César Award for Most Promising Actor; Nominated - International Cinephile Society - Best Supporting Actor
2018	Le ciel est clair	Jérémy	Marie Rosselet-Ruiz	Short
2018	Étienne Daho - L'Etincelle	The man	Romain Winkler	Music video
2019	Sweetheart	Mehdi	Lisa Azuelos	
2019	Paradise Hills	Son	Alice Waddington	
2020	My Best Part	Albert	Nicolas Maury	
2021	Si demain	Alex	Fabienne Godet	
2021	Spring Blossom	Raphaël Frei	Suzanne Lindon	
2022	Méduse	Guillaume	Sophie Lévy	
2023	Good Grief	Theo	Dan Levy	

=== Television ===
Year	Title	Role	Director(s)	Notes
2020	Moloch	Tom	Arnaud Malherbe	TV mini-series
2023	LT-21	Gabriel Lemazec	Melisa Godet	TV mini-series
2024	Becoming Karl Lagerfeld	Yves Saint Laurent	Jérôme Salle; Audrey Estrougo	TV mini-series
2025	The Morning Show	Arnaud Dumont	Various	TV series

=== Filmmaker ===
Year	Title	Notes
2021	Le nouveau moi	Short

== Theater ==
Year	Title	Author	Director
2020	Jardin d’hiver	Laurence Tardieu	Richard Brunel
2020-22	The Ugly Duckling	Hans Christian Andersen	Sandra Gaudin
