= The Long Falling =

- Film poster
- French: Où va la nuit
- Directed by: Martin Provost
- Screenplay by: Martin Provost; Marc Abdelnour
- Based on: The Long Falling by Keith Ridgway
- Produced by: Christophe Jeauffroy; Julie Salvador; Patrick Quinet; Jean-Louis Livi
- Starring: Yolande Moreau
- Cinematography: Agnès Godard
- Edited by: Ludo Troch
- Music by: Hugues Tabar-Nouval
- Distributed by: Diaphana Films (France)
- Release date: 4 May 2011 (France)
- Running time: 105 minutes
- Countries: France; Belgium
- Language: French
- Budget: $4.8 million
- Box office: $903.000

The Long Falling (French: Où va la nuit; lit. 'Where does the night go') is a 2011 French-Belgian drama film written and directed by Martin Provost.

== Plot ==
Long a victim of her violent and alcoholic husband, Rose Mayer decides to choose her own destiny, and kills him by crushing him with their car after leaving prison (for having crushed a girl with the same car). She leaves the Walloon countryside and joins her homosexual son in Brussels, who left the family hell on the day of his 16th birthday. But freedom does not erase guilt and family stories are not without contradictions. Will Rose find her place in his new life?

== Cast ==
- Yolande Moreau as Rose Mayer
- Pierre Moure as Thomas Mayer
- Édith Scob as Madame Talbot
- Jan Hammenecker as Inspector Nols
- Laurent Capelluto as Denis
- Eric Godon as Debacker
- Loïc Pichon as The husband
- Servane Ducorps as Marina
- Valentijn Dhaenens as Vincent

== Accolades ==
Award	Category	Recipients and nominees	Result
Magritte Awards	Best Actress	Yolande Moreau	Nominated
Magritte Awards	Best Supporting Actor	Laurent Capelluto	Nominated
