= Cheniménil =

- Commune
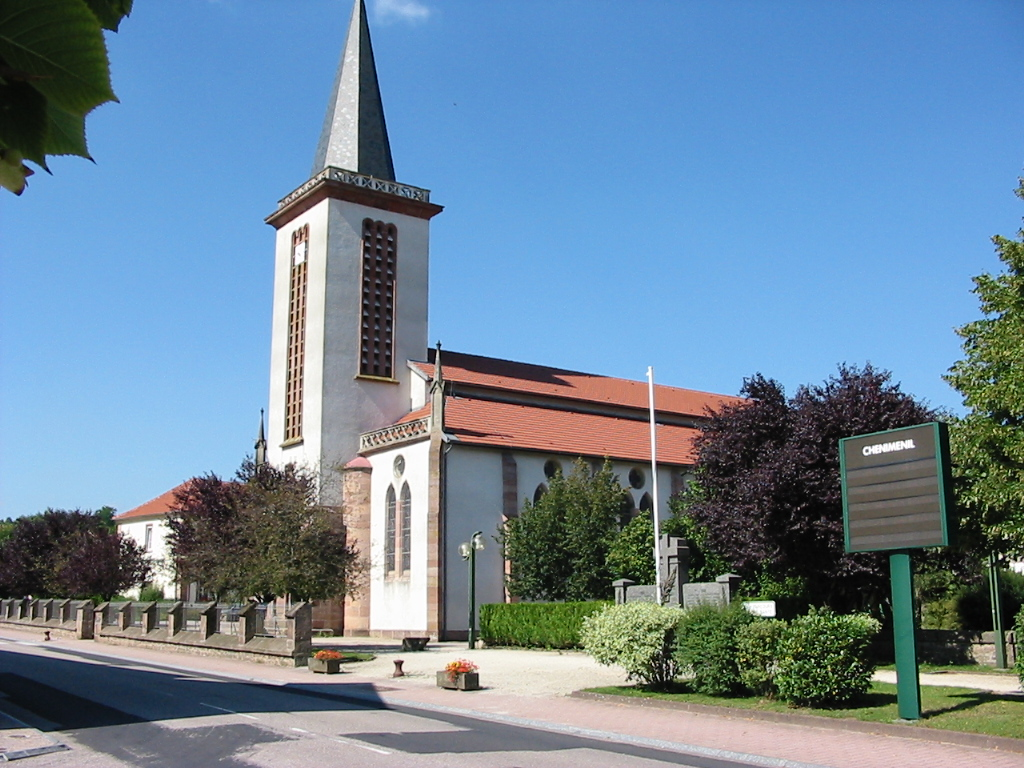
- The church in Cheniménil

- Coat of arms
- Location of Cheniménil
- Location within France Location within Grand Est
- Coordinates: 48°08′20″N 6°36′18″E
- Country: France
- Region: Grand Est
- Department: Vosges
- Arrondissement: Saint-Dié-des-Vosges
- Canton: Bruyères
- Intercommunality: CC Bruyères - Vallons des Vosges

Government
  - Mayor (2020–2026): Joël Mangel
- Area^{1}: 9.28 km^{2} (3.58 sq mi)
- Highest elevation: 617 m (2,024 ft)
- Lowest elevation: 362 m (1,188 ft)
- Population (2023): 1,210
  - Density: 130/km^{2} (338/sq mi)
- Time zone: UTC+01:00 (CET)
  - Summer (DST): UTC+02:00 (CEST)
- INSEE/Postal code: 88101 /88460
- Website: pagesperso-orange.fr/chenimenil
- ^{1} French Land Register data, which excludes lakes, ponds, glaciers > 1 km^{2} (0.386 sq mi or 247 acres) and river estuaries.

Cheniménil (French pronunciation: [ʃənimenil]) is a commune in the Vosges department in Grand Est in northeastern France.

== History ==
The name Chinumasnil is attested as early as 1156 in a document preserved in the Meurthe-et-Moselle archives under reference H 333. Cheniménil was part of the bailiwick of Bruyères. Within its territory were three lordships: Saint-Pierre, Raigecourt (or Rachecourt), and Parois. At the time of the French Revolution, these were united and belonged to the lord of the village. In addition to rural fines, he collected one-third of the rents from leased and rented communal lands.

The church was an annex of Docelles.

Cheniménil was part of the canton of Docelles until 19 Vendémiaire year X (October 11, 1801).

During the World War II, Cheniménil was captured by Nazi Germany, resulting of extensively heavy damage until the Allied Powers arrived cir. 1944 - 1945.

== Notable people ==
- Emmanuelle Riva (1927-2017), French actress, born in Cheniménil

== See also ==
- Communes of the Vosges department
