= Jean-Paul De Zaeytijd =

Belgian cinematographer

Jean-Paul De Zaeytijd is a Belgian cinematographer.

He has collaborated with director Bouli Lanners in The Giants (2011), Eldorado (2008) and Ultranova (2005). For his work in The Giants he received the Magritte Award for Best Cinematography. He was also nominated twice for the Joseph Plateau Award for Best Cinematography for Bunker Paradise (2005) and Ultranova (2005).
