= Rumba (2008 film) =

- Directed by: Dominique Abel; Fiona Gordon
- Starring: Dominique Abel; Fiona Gordon; Bruno Romy
- Distributed by: Filmoption International
- Release date: 2008
- Running time: 77 minutes
- Countries: Belgium; France
- Language: French

Rumba is a 2008 comedy film starring Dominique Abel and Fiona Gordon as a married couple who love Latin dancing, and Bruno Romy as a depressed man trying to commit suicide. It was an entry in the International Critics' Week during the 2008 Cannes Film Festival.

== Critical reception ==
With its semi-silent style, the movie was generally well received by the critics. It has a fresh (86%) rating on Rotten Tomatoes.
