= Spring Blossom =

2020 French drama film

- Theatrical film poster
- French: Seize printemps
- Directed by: Suzanne Lindon
- Written by: Suzanne Lindon
- Produced by: Caroline Bonmarchand
- Starring: Suzanne Lindon; Arnaud Valois
- Cinematography: Jérémie Attard
- Edited by: Pascale Chavance
- Music by: Vincent Delerm
- Production company: Avenue B Productions
- Distributed by: Paname Distribution
- Release date: September 1, 2020 (Angoulême)
- Running time: 73 minutes
- Country: France
- Language: French

Spring Blossom (French: Seize printemps) is a 2020 French drama film directed by Suzanne Lindon. The film stars Lindon as Suzanne, a teenage girl who is disenchanted with her peer group, and develops a relationship with Raphaël (Arnaud Valois), an older actor she meets outside a theatre.

The film was named as an Official Selection of the 2020 Cannes Film Festival, although it was not able to screen at Cannes due to the cancellation of the festival in light of the COVID-19 pandemic in France. It screened at the Angoulême Francophone Film Festival, and at the 2020 Toronto International Film Festival. It was also screened at the 51st International Film Festival of India in the World panorama section. It received mixed to positive reviews from critics and audiences.

== Cast ==
- Suzanne Lindon as Suzanne
- Arnaud Valois as Raphaël Frei
- Frédéric Pierrot as Suzanne's father
- Florence Viala as Suzanne's mother
- Rebecca Marder as Marie
- Arthur Giusi as Léonard
- Pauline Rugo as Murielle
- Dominique Besnehard as Gérard Beaumann

== Production ==
The screenplay for Spring Blossom was written by Suzanne Lindon (who is also its director) at the age of 15. The director cast herself in the film at the age of 20.

== Reception ==
On review aggregator website Rotten Tomatoes, the film has an approval rating of 93% based on 45 critics, with an average rating of 6.6/10. The site's critical consensus reads, "An enchanting debut for writer-director-star Suzanne Lindon, Spring Blossom captures first love with fittingly delicate beauty."

Katie Walsh of the Los Angeles Times wrote "Such a confident and self-assured debut would be remarkable for a filmmaker of any age, as Spring Blossom is a finely wrought, sensitively felt and artistically bold work".

Jake Cole of Slant Magazine praised the director and her debut film for "[painting] a concise and truthful portrait of her protagonist's feelings of estrangement", while Tim Robey of The Daily Telegraph called it "tender, amiable and sweetly played".

Jordan Mintzer of The Hollywood Reporter called Spring Blossom as "Provocative and original, if a bit slight".

According to Steve Rose of The Guardian, "[the film] is a fleeting affair in every sense".

The international press was also positive in regard to the film's premise and release. Writing for The Indian Express, a daily newspaper in India, Shubhra Gupta said "The connection between [Suzanne Lindon and Arnaud Valois] is tenuous, but tangible: you get the feeling that it may not last too long, as teenage passions are wont to, but it may leave a stamp on both. In spring, things blossom".
