= Suzanne Lindon =

French actress and filmmaker (born 2000)

- Lindon in 2026
- Born: 13 April 2000 (age 26); Paris, France
- Education: Lycée Henri-IV; École des Arts Décoratifs
- Occupations: Actress; filmmaker
- Years active: 2016–present
- Parents: Vincent Lindon (father); Sandrine Kiberlain (mother)

Suzanne Lindon (born 13 April 2000) is a French actress and filmmaker. In 2020, she made her directorial debut with Spring Blossom, which she also wrote.

== Early life ==
Lindon was born in Paris on 13 April 2000, the daughter of César-winning actress Sandrine Kiberlain and actor Vincent Lindon, recipient of the 2015 Cannes Film Festival Award for Best Actor. Through her father, she is the great-granddaughter of Raymond Lindon, who served as the magistrate and mayor of Étretat between 1929 and 1959, and the great niece of Jérôme Lindon, director of Les Éditions de Minuit. Through her father, she is also the great-great-granddaughter of Fernande Citroën, who was the older sister of André Citroën and the wife of Alfred Lindon (born Abner Lindenbaum), a Jewish jeweler and modern art collector originally from Kraków, Poland. Through her paternal grandmother, Alix Dufaure, a journalist for Marie Claire, she is also a descendant of French Prime minister Jules Dufaure and Marshal Rémy Joseph Isidore Exelmans.

In 2015, Lindon entered the elite Lycée Henri-IV in Paris, where she earned a baccalauréat L (littéraire) with highest honors (mention très bien). After a one-year preparatory course in drawing, Lindon entered the École nationale supérieure des arts décoratifs.

== Career ==
Lindon was largely kept out of the spotlight that surrounded her parents, who wanted her to have a private childhood. She made her first film appearance in 2016, as an extra in the short film Bonne figure (Smile), directed by her mother and starring Chiara Mastroianni as a famous actress who attends a cocktail party held in her honour. The film was presented as one of the closing films of Critics' Week at the 2016 Cannes Film Festival.

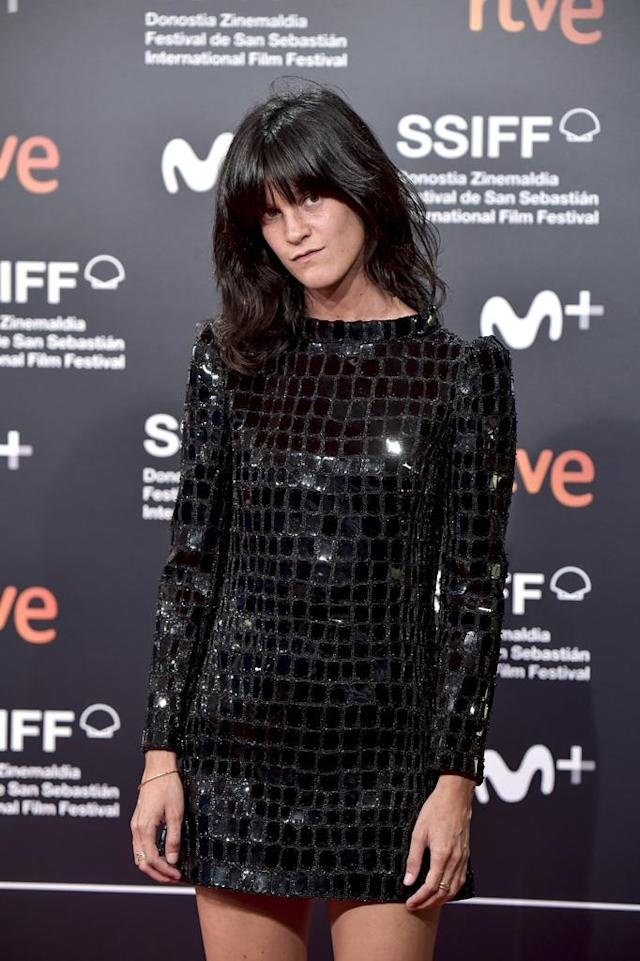
Suzanne Lindon at the 69th San Sebastian International Film Festival in 2021

In 2020, Suzanne Lindon directed her first feature film, Spring Blossom (Seize Printemps), in which she starred in the lead role opposite Arnaud Valois. Selected in the First Features section of the official selection of the 2020 Cannes Film Festival, the film was however not presented at Cannes after the festival was cancelled due to the global COVID-19 pandemic. The film tells the story of a bored 16-year-old French teenager who passes in front of the same theatre each day and comes to meet there a 35-year-old actor (played by Valois) for whom she falls head over heels in love. Lindon wrote the screenplay when she was 15, in the summer before she entered Lycée Henri-IV. She shot the film immediately after completing her baccalaureate exams at the age of 18. She was motivated to prove herself as an actress on her own merit. The soundtrack of the film, which features original music by Vincent Delerm, includes a title track sung by Lindon. The film received praise from critics.

In 2022, she joined the cast of season 2 of the drama television series In Therapy (En thérapie), alongside Frédéric Pierrot, Charlotte Gainsbourg, Jacques Weber, and Eye Haïdara. Lindon starred in the role of Lydia, a young architecture student with cancer who stubbornly refuses treatment. Lindon's seven episodes were directed by the César-winning director Arnaud Desplechin.

Alongside her acting career, Lindon has been active in fashion. In 2017, while she was still a high school student, the magazine Vogue Italia devoted several pages to her where she was interviewed and featured in a series of photographs taken by Paolo Roversi. In 2020, when she was 20 years old, the designer Hedi Slimane chose her as the face of the fashion house Celine, of which he was the artistic director, seduced by her androgynous appearance and "eminently Parisian style".

== Filmography ==
=== Film ===
Year	Title	Role	Notes
2016	Bonne figure		Short film
2021	Spring Blossom	Suzanne	Also director and writer
2022	Forever Young	The Waitress	
2025	Colours of Time	Adèle	
2025	The Fence	—N/a	Only writer
2027	L’Équipe	—N/a	Only director and writer; post-production

=== Television ===
Year	Title	Role	Notes
2022	In Therapy	Lydia	7 episodes

== Accolades ==
Award	Date of ceremony	Category	Film	Result	Ref.
San Sebastián International Film Festival	26 September 2020	New Directors Award	Spring Blossom	Nominated	
São Paulo International Film Festival	4 November 2020	New Directors Competition	Spring Blossom	Nominated	
Mar del Plata International Film Festival	29 November 2020	SIGNIS Award - Special Mention	Spring Blossom	Won	
Macau International Movie Festival	8 December 2020	Best Director	Spring Blossom	Won	
