= Pascal Chaumeil =

French director and screenwriter

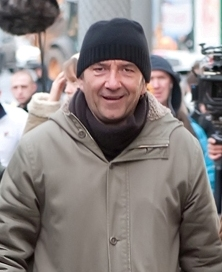
- Pascal Chaumeil in 2011
- Born: 9 February 1961; Paris, France
- Died: 27 August 2015 (aged 54); Paris, France
- Occupations: Director, screenwriter
- Years active: 1982–2015

Pascal Chaumeil (9 February 1961 – 27 August 2015) was a French director and screenwriter. He started out as an assistant director in the 1980s, working with directors such as Pierre Tchernia and Luc Besson. He was nominated for two César Awards, both for the film Heartbreaker (2010). He died in 2015.

== Filmography ==
Year	Title	Notes
1995	Des hommes avec des bas	Short film (also as screenwriter); Festival du Film Policier de Cognac - Best Short
1998	Sands of Eden	Telefilm (uncredited)
2001–2002	Avocats et Associés	TV series
2000–2003	Blague à part	TV series
2003	Clémence	Telefilm
2005–2006	Spiral	TV series
2006	Mer belle à agitée	Telefilm
2006	L'État de Grace	TV Mini-Series
2007–2014	Fais pas ci, fais pas ça	TV series (also as actor)
2009	Duel en ville	Telefilm
2010	Heartbreaker	Globes de Cristal Award for Best Film; Nominated—César Award for Best Film; Nominated—César Award for Best First Feature Film
2012	A Perfect Plan	Newport Beach Film Festival - Jury Award for Best Director
2014	A Long Way Down	
2015	Spotless	TV series
2016	Odd Job	
