= The Fairy =

2011 film

- Film poster
- Directed by: Dominique Abel; Fiona Gordon; Bruno Romy
- Written by: Dominique Abel; Fiona Gordon; Bruno Romy
- Starring: Dominique Abel; Fiona Gordon; Bruno Romy
- Release date: 12 May 2011 (Cannes)
- Running time: 93 minutes
- Countries: Belgium; France
- Language: French

The Fairy (French: La Fée) is a 2011 French-Belgian comedy film written and directed by Dominique Abel, Fiona Gordon and Bruno Romy. It won several prizes at the 2nd Magritte Awards.

== Cast ==
- Dominique Abel as Dom
- Fiona Gordon as Fiona, the titular fairy
- Philippe Martz as John
- Bruno Romy as the owner of l'Amour Flou
- Vladimir Zongo as the first illegal immigrant
- Destiné M'Bikula Mayemba as the second illegal immigrant
- Willson Goma as the third illegal immigrant
- Didier Armbruster as the flying man
- Anaïs Lemarchand as the singer
- Lenny Martz as Jimmy
