= Dominique Abel and Fiona Gordon =

Belgian directors

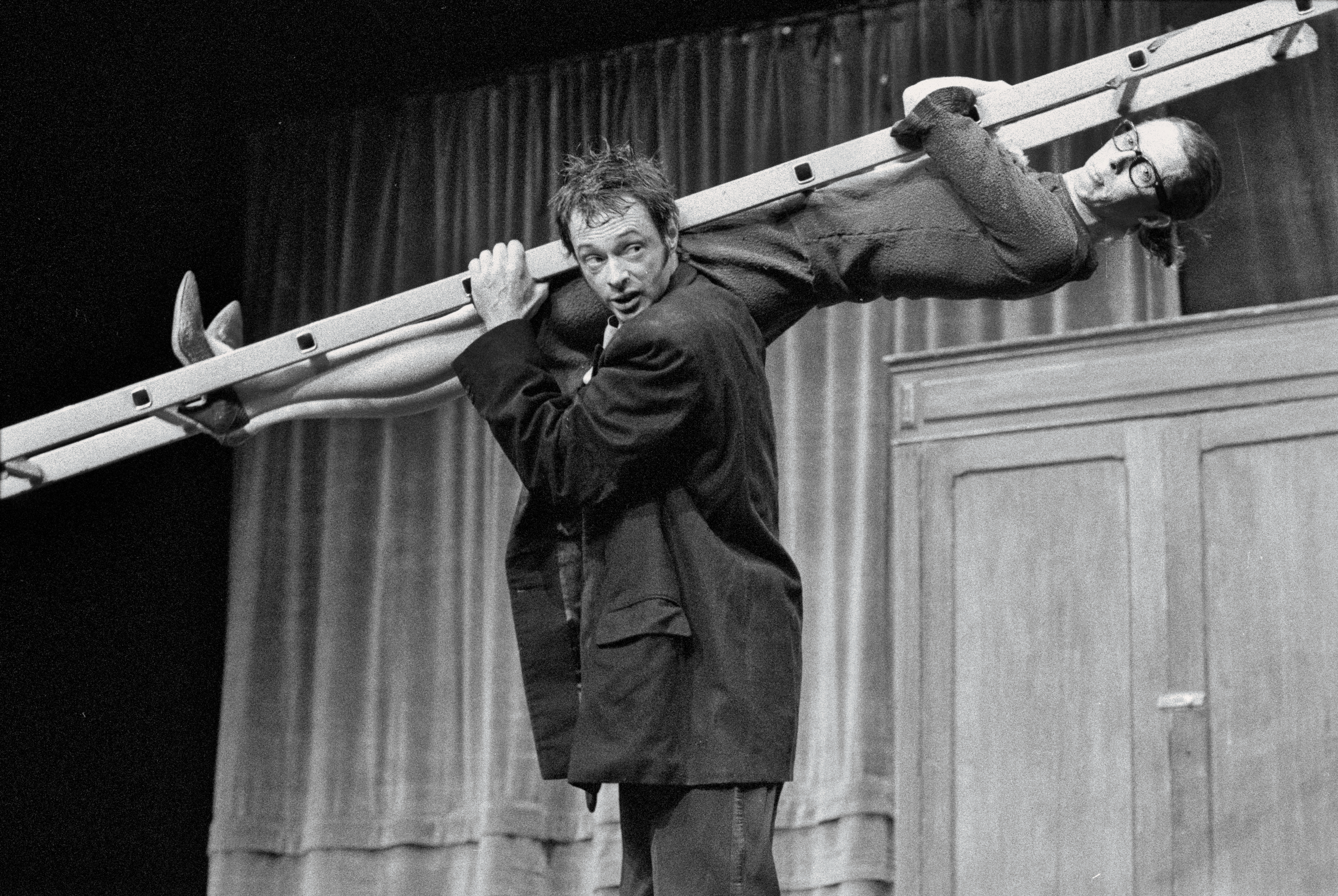
- Born: Dominique Abel: 1957 (age 68–69); Thuin, Belgium Fiona Gordon: 1957 (age 68–69); Melbourne, Australia
- Education: L'École Internationale de Théâtre Jacques Lecoq; École Philippe Gaulier
- Occupations: Directors; writers; actors; producers
- Years active: 1992–present

Dominique Abel and Fiona Gordon are Belgian film and stage directors, writers and actors. Their films have received numerous Magritte Awards, nominations for the Lumière Award for Best French Language Film and the Saturn Award for Best International Film, as well as award recognition from film festivals with premieres at the Telluride Film Festival and the Cannes Film Festival.

Abel and Gordon's films include Rumba, The Fairy, and Lost in Paris, which also starred Pierre Richard and Emanuelle Riva, in one of her final screen appearances.

Prior to their work in film, Gordon co-founded the Théâtre de Complicité in London. Both Abel and Gordon have extensive careers in the European theater and circus.

== Career ==
After both training under Philippe Gaulier at École Philippe Gaulier and Jacques Lecoq at École Internationale de Théâtre Jacques Lecoq in France, Dominique Abel and Fiona Gordon have worked as a writing and directing team through most of their professional careers.

Initially, Gordon was a founding member of the Théâtre de Complicité in London. Complicité received multiple Olivier Awards, the Perrier Comedy Award, Evening Standard Awards, the Europe Theatre Prize, and nominations for the Tony Award and Drama Desk Award.

After performing in London, Gordon joined Abel in Belgium where they formed their own company, Courage mon amour. They made their directing debut in 2005 with L'iceberg, which was co-directed with Bruno Romy. L'iceberg won Best Film at the Bogota Film Festival and Best Actress for Gordon at the Seattle International Film Festival, as well as nominations from the Marrakech International Film Festival and Taipei Film Festival.

Their follow-up, Rumba, was screened in the International Critics' Week during the 2008 Cannes Film Festival and released to critical acclaim, with critics praising the film's semi-silent style. The film won Best Film from the Zagreb Film Festival, and was nominated for the Bronze Horse at the Stockholm International Film Festival, and won the Audience Award from the Athens International Film Festival.

Abel and Gordon then directed The Fairy (2011): at the 2nd Magritte Awards, the film received five nominations, including Best Film, Best Director, and Best Actor, winning two. The film was nominated for the C.I.C.A.E. Award at the Cannes Film Festival and the Saturn Award for Best International Film. Additionally, the film won Best Narrative at the Hamptons International Film Festival and received nominations from the Hawai'i International Film Festival, Stockholm International Film Festival, and the St. Louis Film Critics Association.

Their next film, Lost in Paris (2016), earned Abel and Gordon their second nomination for the Magritte Award for Best Film, a nomination Magritte Award for Best Actress, and won the Magritte Award for Best Editing. The film was nominated for the Lumière Award for Best French-Language Film. Additionally, the film won the Rare Pearl Award from the Denver Film Festival and won the Audience Award from the Mill Valley Film Festival.

In The Falling Star (2023) Abel and Gordon worked again with Bruno Romy. The film received critical acclaim from Variety and The New York Times. The film was nominated for the Prix du Public at the Locarno Film Festival.

== Filmography ==
Year	Title	Functioned as			Notes
Year	Title	Directors	Writers	Producers	Notes
2005	L'iceberg	Yes	Yes	Executive	Co-directed with Bruno Romy
2008	Rumba	Yes	Yes	Executive	Co-directed with Bruno Romy
2011	The Fairy	Yes	Yes	No	Co-directed with Bruno Romy
2016	Lost in Paris	Yes	Yes	Yes	
2023	The falling star	Yes	Yes		
