= Tania Garbarski =

Belgian actress

Tania Garbarski is a Belgian actress who has appeared in film, television and theatre. She is the daughter of filmmaker Sam Garbarski.

After developing an interest in acting, Garbarski enrolled at the INSAS Film School in Brussels. She began working in theatre at an early age and appeared in productions by directors such as Deborah Warner, Olivier Py and Ariane Mnouchkine. She also appears in films – her credits include La Chance de ma vie (2009), Don't Tell Her (2016) and Bye Bye Germany (2017). For her work in A Distant Neighborhood (2010), Garbarski received a Magritte Award nomination in the category of Best Supporting Actress.

Garbarski has been married to actor Charlie Dupont since 2001. They have two daughters, Lily and Emma.
