= My Best Part =

2020 film

- Film poster
- French: Garçon chiffon
- Directed by: Nicolas Maury
- Written by: Nicolas Maury; Sophie Fillières; Maud Ameline
- Produced by: Charles Gillibert
- Starring: Nicolas Maury; Nathalie Baye
- Cinematography: Raphaël Vandenbussche
- Edited by: Louise Jaillette
- Production company: CG Cinéma
- Distributed by: Les Films du Losange
- Release date: August 28, 2020 (Angoulême)
- Running time: 108 minutes
- Country: France
- Language: French

My Best Part (French: Garçon chiffon) is a 2020 French comedy-drama film, directed by Nicolas Maury. The film stars Maury as Jérémie, an actor who moves back home to live with his mother Bernadette (Nathalie Baye) after setbacks in his career and his romantic life with his boyfriend Albert (Arnaud Valois).

The film was named as an official selection of the 2020 Cannes Film Festival, although it was not screened at that time due to the COVID-19 pandemic in France; it instead had its theatrical premiere on August 28 at the Angoulême Francophone Film Festival. It was screened for distributors in the Industry Selects program at the 2020 Toronto International Film Festival, and had its commercial premiere on October 28.

== Cast ==
- Nicolas Maury as Jérémie Meyer
- Nathalie Baye as Bernadette Meyer
- Arnaud Valois as Albert
- Théo Christine as Kévin
- Laure Calamy as Sylvie
- Jean-Marc Barr as The director
- Laurent Capelluto as Jean-François
- Dominique Reymond as The therapist
- Carole Franck
