= A Distant Neighborhood (film) =

2010 film directed by Sam Garbarski

- Theatrical release poster
- French: Quartier Lointain
- Directed by: Sam Garbarski
- Written by: Sam Garbarski; Jérôme Tonnerre; Philippe Blasband
- Based on: A Distant Neighborhood by Jiro Taniguchi
- Starring: Pascal Greggory; Jonathan Zaccaï; Alexandra Maria Lara; Léo Legrand
- Cinematography: Jeanne Lapoirie
- Edited by: Ludo Troch
- Music by: Air
- Distributed by: Wild Bunch Distribution (France); X Verleih AG (through Warner Bros.) (Germany)
- Release dates: 20 May 2010 (Germany); 24 November 2010 (France)
- Running time: 98 minutes
- Countries: Belgium; France; Germany; Luxembourg
- Language: French

A Distant Neighborhood (French: Quartier Lointain) is a 2010 internationally co-produced fantasy film directed by Sam Garbarski. The screenplay, written by Garbarski alongside Jérôme Tonnerre and Philippe Blasband, was based on the manga series A Distant Neighborhood by Jiro Taniguchi. The film stars Pascal Greggory, Jonathan Zaccaï, Alexandra Maria Lara and Léo Legrand, with Évelyne Didi, Lionel Abelanski and Tania Garbarski in supporting roles.

The film tells the story of Thomas Verniaz, a middle-aged family man who accidentally takes a train ride back to his old hometown and visits his mother's grave. Thomas is then transported back in time, and discovers that he's a teenager again, but with all of his adult memories intact.

A Distant Neighborhood was met with mostly positive reviews, with critics commending its faithfulness to the source material and the performances of its cast, particularly Zaccaï and Legrand. It received five nominations at the 2011 Magritte Awards, including Best Director for Garbarski, and went on to win Best Production Design for Véronique Sacrez.

== Plot ==
Thomas Verniaz is a comic book artist in his fifties, suffering from a creative block and trapped in an unhappy home life. Returning to Paris from a professional convention, he boards the wrong train and ends up in his hometown in rural France. With several hours to kill before the next train, he wanders through familiar spots, visits his long-abandoned childhood home with an old friend, and then heads to the cemetery where his mother is buried. Through his reflections, the backstory emerges: in 1967, his father Bruno — a tailor — abandoned the family without explanation and was never heard from again. His mother Anna never recovered from the loss and died of grief a few years later. Overcome by the heat at the cemetery, Thomas faints.

When he comes to, he notices something strange about his body and clothes. Catching his reflection in a shop window, he realizes he has traveled back in time and is a teenager once more. Shaken and emotional, he is reunited with his father, mother, little sister, friends, and dog. Convinced it is all a dream, he goes to bed certain that by morning everything will be back to normal.

He wakes up still in 1967, fourteen years old. He attends school, reconnects with old friends, and crosses paths again with Sylvie Dumontel, a girl he was secretly in love with but never had the courage to approach. Armed with knowledge of everything yet to come, Thomas tries to change things: he pays closer attention to his mother, makes efforts to bond with his father, and pursues his feelings for Sylvie. Observing his family more carefully, however, he realizes his parents' marriage was never as happy as he had believed. Through his grandmother, he learns that his mother had once been engaged to Bruno's best friend, who died in World War II — a loss that had brought his parents together. Unable to reach his father openly, Thomas senses a deep anguish in him and begins investigating on his own. Following Bruno on his delivery rounds, he discovers his father has been secretly visiting a woman gravely ill in a sanatorium. She dies shortly after speaking with Thomas, deepening the mystery.

The night after her death, Bruno visits Thomas's room and speaks a few words heavy with bitterness and uncertainty. The next day is Bruno's fortieth birthday — the very moment, Thomas knows, when his father disappeared. He watches his father anxiously all day, but loses track of him for just a moment that evening. Bruno is gone. Thomas races to the train station, where his father is found about to board a train to Paris. He pleads with him to stay, describing what lies ahead: the collapse of the tailor shop, his mother's grief and death, his own lifelong pain. But Bruno's mind is made up. He says he should have left long ago, that the situation is unbearable, and that the weight on his chest is too great to bear. He boards the train and is gone.

Thomas returns home, where his mother tries to explain away her husband's absence as a night out with friends. Thomas tells her that his father is not coming back, and begs her not to wait for him or torment herself — his attempt to spare her the grief that will one day kill her.

In the final scene, Thomas walks to the cemetery, where the family grave is still empty. He faints once more and wakes in the present, finding his mother's gravestone unchanged, bearing the same date of death. He boards the train back to Paris, and while walking through the city, notices an elderly man who bears a striking resemblance to his father. They pass each other without a word, but Thomas is left wondering. He arrives home to find his wife and daughters setting the table for dinner.

== Cast ==
- Pascal Greggory as Thomas Verniaz
- Jonathan Zaccaï as Bruno Verniaz
- Alexandra Maria Lara as Anna Verniaz (née Zorn)
- Léo Legrand as young Thomas Verniaz
- Évelyne Didi as Yvette
- Lionel Abelanski as Godin
- Sophie Duez as Catherine
- Tania Garbarski as Nelly

== Accolades ==
Award / Film Festival	Category	Recipients and nominees	Result
Festival du Film Francophone	Views of the Present	Sam Garbarski	Nominated
Magritte Award	Best Director	Sam Garbarski	Nominated
Magritte Award	Best Actor	Jonathan Zaccaï	Nominated
Magritte Award	Best Supporting Actress	Tania Garbarski	Nominated
Magritte Award	Best Production Design	Véronique Sacrez	Won
Magritte Award	Best Costume Design	Claire Dubien	Nominated
Rome Film Festival	Alice in the City Prize		Nominated
Transatlantyk Festival	Audience Award		Nominated
Young Artist Award	Best Young Performer	Léo Legrand	Nominated
