= Guy-Patrick Sainderichin =

French screenwriter and actor (1950–2025)

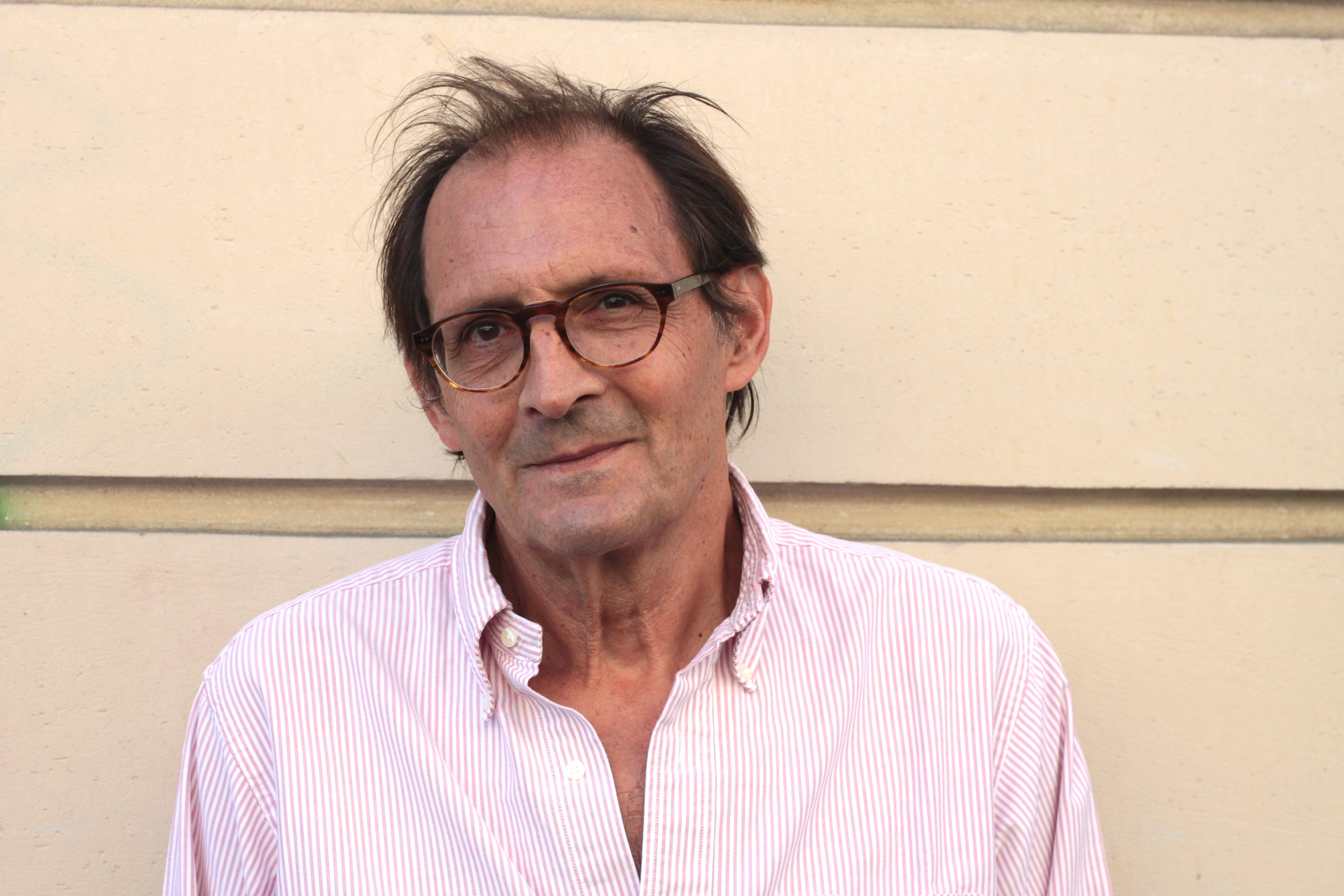
- Sainderichin in 2014
- Born: 9 July 1950; Piégut-Pluviers, France
- Died: 18 August 2025 (aged 75); Paris, France
- Education: Institut des hautes études cinématographiques
- Occupations: Screenwriter; actor

Guy-Patrick Sainderichin (9 July 1950 – 18 August 2025) was a French screenwriter and actor.

== Life and career ==
Born in Piégut-Pluviers on 9 July 1950, Sainderichin was the son of journalists Pierre and Ginette Sainderichin. He graduated from the Institut des hautes études cinématographiques in 1975. As a student, he organized the far-left film school organization Collectif Cinélutte in the wake of the May 68 protests. He wrote scripts for numerous films and TV series, namely Maigret and Spiral. He also acted in three films directed by Mia Hansen-Løve. In 2022, he published the novel Société Monte-Cristo, which told the story of a secret society of avengers.

Sainderichin died in Paris on 18 August 2025, at the age of 75.

== Filmography ==
=== Screenwriter ===
- L'Homme aux yeux d'argent (1985)
- Buisson ardent (1987)
- À corps et à cris (1989)
- Mort d'un gardien de la paix (1994)
- La Bavure (1994)
- Maigret (1996)
- Spiral (2005)

=== Actor ===
- Father of My Children (2009)
- Goodbye First Love (2011)
- Things to Come (2016)
