= Philippe Dajoux =

French actor and film director

Philippe Dajoux (born 23 March 1968 in Marseille) is a French actor and film director.

== Biography ==
After training as an actor, he made film clips, short and long features. He has worked in television since 2006, notably making 277 episodes of the series Plus belle la vie and 24 episodes of Seconde Chance.

== Filmography ==
- 1997 : Gueules d'amour
- 1999 : Les Collègues
- 2001 : La Grande Vie !
- 2005 : Une belle histoire
- 2006 : Plus belle la vie (TV series)
- 2008 : Seconde Chance (TV series)
- 2015 : Deux au carré
