= Sam Garbarski =

Belgian film director and screenwriter (born 1948)

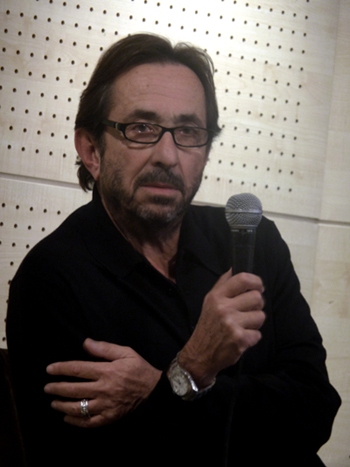
- Garbarski in 2010
- Born: 13 February 1948 (age 78); Planegg, Germany
- Years active: 1998–present

Sam Garbarski (born 13 February 1948) is a Belgian film director and screenwriter. His film Irina Palm (2007) was awarded Best European Film at the 53rd David di Donatello Awards. He then directed A Distant Neighborhood (2010), a fantasy film based on the manga of the same name by Jiro Taniguchi. Garbarski co-wrote its screenplay with Jérôme Tonnerre and Philippe Blasband. The film earned him a Magritte Award nomination in the category of Best Director.

His film Bye Bye Germany was released in 2017 to critical acclaim. He grew up as child of two Holocaust survivors and left West-Germany for Belgium in 1970. He is the father of actress Tania Garbarski.
