= Gwen Berrou =

Belgian actress

Gwen Berrou is a Belgian actress. She is best known for playing Marth in Bouli Lanners drama The Giants (2011). For her role, she received a Magritte Award for Best Supporting Actress.

== Selected filmography ==
- Henri, directed by Yolande Moreau (2013)
- Good People (2022), TV series
