= Nicolas Maury =

French actor and filmmaker

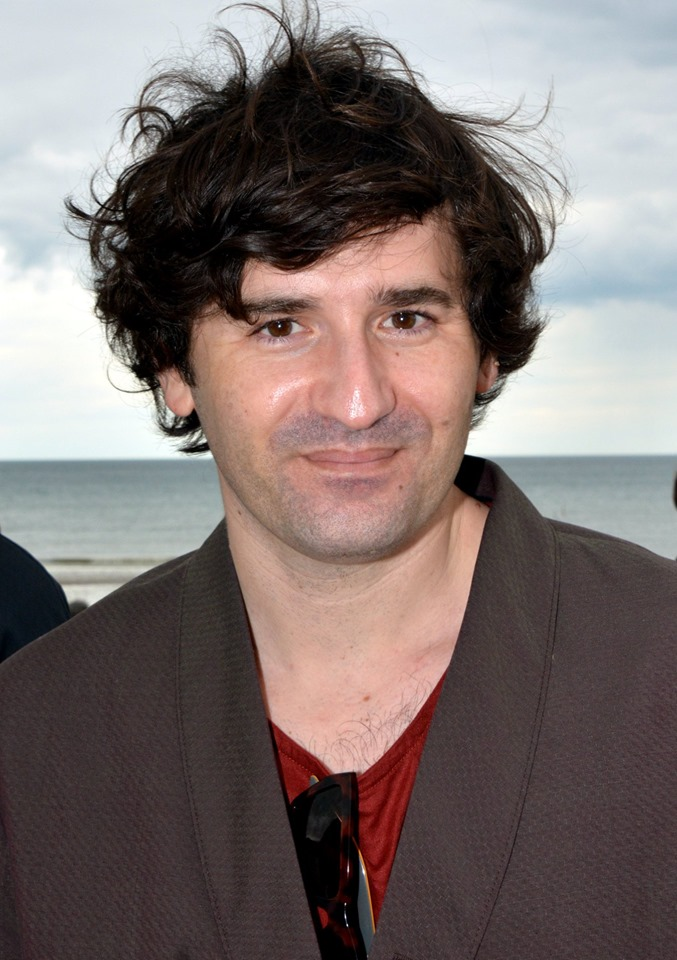
- Born: October 18, 1980 (age 45); Saint-Yrieix-la-Perche, Haute-Vienne, Nouvelle-Aquitaine, France
- Occupations: Actor, film director
- Years active: 1990s-present
- Notable work: Call My Agent!, My Best Part

Nicolas Maury (born 14 October 1980) is a French actor and filmmaker. He is most noted for his regular role as Hervé in the television series Call My Agent! (Dix pour cent), and his directorial debut film My Best Part (Garçon chiffon), which was a César Award nominee for Best First Feature Film at the 46th César Awards in 2021.

Maury had his first acting role in Patrice Chéreau's 1998 film Those Who Love Me Can Take the Train (Ceux qui m'aiment prendront le train).

He is out as gay. He served as the president of the Queer Palm jury at the 2021 Cannes Film Festival, and stated his support for the program becoming an official festival award.

== Filmography ==
Year	Title	Role	Notes
1998	Those Who Love Me Can Take the Train (Ceux qui m'aiment prendront le train)		
2005	Regular Lovers (Les Amants réguliers)	Gauthier	
2005	Backstage	a fan	
2006	Paris, je t'aime	Jeff	segment Quartier des Enfants-Rouges
2007	Heartbeat Detector (La Question humaine)	Tavera	
2007	Let's Dance (Faut que ça danse !)	le chargé de clientèle	
2009	The French Kissers (Les Beaux Gosses)	the French professor	
2010	Dear Prudence (Belle Épine)	Daniel Cohen	
2011	My Little Princess	Louis	
2011	Let My People Go!	Ruben	
2012	I'm Not Dead (Je ne suis pas mort)	Antoine Deloÿs	
2013	A Castle in Italy (Un château en Italie)	the director	
2013	You and the Night (Les Rencontres d'après minuit)	Udo	
2014	Jacky in Women's Kingdom (Jacky au royaume des filles)	Second speaker	
2015	Portrait of the Artist (Le Dos rouge)	Young Journalist	
2015-2020	Call My Agent! (Dix pour cent)	Hervé	Series regular
2016	La folle histoire de Max et Léon	Eugène	
2018	The Magic Tuche (Les Tuche 3)	Barna Bé	
2018	Knife+Heart (Un couteau dans le cœur)	Archibald Langevin	
2019	Perdrix	Julien Perdrix	
2019	Spellbound (Les Envoûtés)	Sylvain	
2020	My Best Part (Garçon chiffon)	Jérémie Meyer	also director
2020	C'est la vie	Dr Antoine Moretti	
