= Digitas Health =

- Company type: Subsidiary
- Industry: Marketing (Health care)
- Predecessor: Medical Broadcasting Corporation
- Founded: 1990; 36 years ago
- Headquarters: Philadelphia, Pennsylvania, United States
- Key people: Brian Lefkowitz (President)
- Services: Marketing agency
- Number of employees: 600 (2014)
- Parent: Publicis
- Website: www.digitashealth.com

Digitas Health is an American interactive marketing agency catering exclusively to healthcare and pharmaceutical companies.

== History ==
The company was founded in 1990 as Medical Broadcasting Corporation and became a unit of Digitas in 2006 as Digitas Health. In 2011, the agency became independent of Digitas, and integrated into the Publicis Healthcare Communications Group (PHCG), the world’s largest healthcare communications network. PHCG is part of Paris-based Publicis Groupe the world’s third-largest communications group, second-largest media counsel and buying group, and in digital and healthcare communications.

In 2014, Digitas Health was re-branded as Digitas Health LifeBrands with more than 600 employees working in Philadelphia, New York, San Francisco, London, and Mumbai.
