= Spark Foundry =

Advertising agency

- Industry: advertising agency
- Founded: 2017
- Headquarters: Chicago
- Area served: Worldwide
- Key people: Sarah Kramer (CEO)
- Services: media selection
- Number of employees: 2,000+
- Parent: Publicis Groupe
- Subsidiaries: Connect
- Website: https://www.sparkfoundryww.com/

Spark Foundry, established in 2017, is an advertising agency that provides media selection services. It is based in Chicago, with offices also in Detroit, New York City, Seattle, Los Angeles, San Francisco as well as other locations world wide. The agency currently has over 2,000 employees.

Spark Foundry, part of the Publicis Media operating system, is a subsidiary of Publicis Groupe, a Paris-based holding company which is the world's third largest communications group, the world's second largest media counsel and media buying group, and active in digital and healthcare communications. Spark Foundry's sister agencies include Digitas, Starcom, Performics, and Zenith.

== History ==
Spark Foundry's roots began in 1929 with the foundation of Benton & Bowles, the first agency to consolidate media and programming in a single media management organization. Benton & Bowles became DMB&B (D'Arcy, Masius, Benton & Bowles) after a merger in 1986. TeleVest, a subsidiary of DMB&B, was created in late 1993 as the national broadcast operation of the company. Then, in 1999, the media planning division of D'Arcy consolidated with TeleVest to form MediaVest, one of the original unbundled, full-service media service companies.

In 2016, MediaVest merged with sister agency Spark to form Mediavest | Spark. In 2017, Mediavest | Spark was renamed Spark Foundry. In 2019, Spark Foundry announced a strategic alliance with sister agency Blue 449, consolidating a number of Blue 449's international branches under the Spark Foundry name while retaining the Blue 449 brand in the US, the UK, and France.

== Capabilities ==
Spark Foundry specializes in:

- Media planning
- Media buying(local and national)
- Branded content/product integration
- Digital media
- Research, data analytics
- Search (SEO/SEM)
- Multicultural media
- Print investment
- Out-Of-Home programs
- Advanced TV
- Social media marketing
- Communications planning
- Local & national TV
- Consumer insights
- Shopper marketing
- Cross Athletes (media buyers who are trained across media platforms)

== Awards and recognition ==
Spark Foundry has received several industry awards and recognition for its work in the advertising/media space.

- 2004: Media Agency of the Year award by Adweek Magazine
- 2005: Gold Medal Award from the IRTS Foundation, Inc.
- 2007 and 2008: Media Agency of the Year by Media Magazine.
- 2009: USA Agency of the Year 2009: Best Buying and Planning. by OMMA Magazine
- December 2009: AdWeekMedia Best of thedia Agency of the Decade by Adweek

== Company mission ==
At the end of 2019, Blue 449 merged with Spark Foundry and the agency underwent a thorough workshop training scheme, in which employees were trained on Spark Foundry's planning process and approach to business. Their company motto is 'We bring heat to brands', with heat standing for 'Higher Engagement, Affininty and Transactions' Spark identify their heat framework as a holistic approach for clientele development as well as rich investment into data, measurement and optimisation.
