= Arthur Sadoun =

French businessman (born 1971)

- Born: 23 May 1971 (age 55)
- Education: European Business School Paris; INSEAD
- Title: Chairman and CEO, Publicis Groupe
- Term: June 2017-
- Predecessor: Maurice Lévy
- Spouse: Anne-Sophie Lapix

Arthur Sadoun (born 23 May 1971) is a French businessman. He is the chairman and CEO of Publicis Groupe, the world's third largest advertising and PR group.

== Early life and education ==
Sadoun was born in Dourdan, France, on 23 May 1971, to a well-off family of industrialists. He received his secondary education from the École alsacienne, a private school in Paris and graduated from European Business School Paris in 1992. He later obtained an MBA from INSEAD in 1997.

== Career ==
In 1992, after graduating in France, Sadoun went to Chile where he founded his own advertising agency Z Group, which he sold to BBDO in 1997.

Soon after returning to France in 1997 he joined TBWA in 1999 as Head of International Strategic Planning and Head of Development before he became managing director in 2000 and CEO in 2003.

In December 2006, Sadoun became CEO of Publicis Conseil, the flagship agency of Publicis Groupe founded by Marcel Bleustein-Blanchet and previously led by Maurice Lévy. His initial focus was on development, leading to the acquisition of key clients for the agency.

In January 2009, Maurice Lévy appointed Arthur Sadoun as CEO of Publicis Worldwide France, a network of 21 agencies including Publicis Conseil, Publicis Dialog, Marcel as well as a regional network across France.

In April 2011, Sadoun was appointed managing director of Publicis Worldwide, the global network of the Publicis creative agencies, before becoming its CEO in October 2013.

In December 2015, Sadoun was named CEO of Publicis Communications, Publicis Groupe's creative hub composed of Leo Burnett, Saatchi & Saatchi, Publicis Worldwide, BBH, MSLGROUP and Prodigious networks, totalling nearly 30,000 employees. His appointment as Chairman & CEO of Publicis Groupe was announced in January 2017. Sadoun officially took on this role on 1 June 2017, making him the 3rd leader of Publicis Groupe in its 91 years of existence after the founder Marcel Bleustein-Blanchet and Maurice Lévy.

== Personal life ==
Sadoun is married to the French journalist and television presenter Anne-Sophie Lapix. Sadoun was diagnosed with Cancer in 2022 and successfully treated. Since returning, he has led initiatives to build support for people working with cancer and eliminate cancer stigma in the workplace.

== Honours ==
Sadoun was made Chevalier of the French National Order of Merit in 2014.

== Accolades ==
In 2016, Sadoun was named "Agency Executive of the Year" by AdAge, and as "Personality of Year" during the 37th French Grand Prix des Agences de l'Année.
