= Charlotte Dauphin =

French filmmaker, fine artist and designer

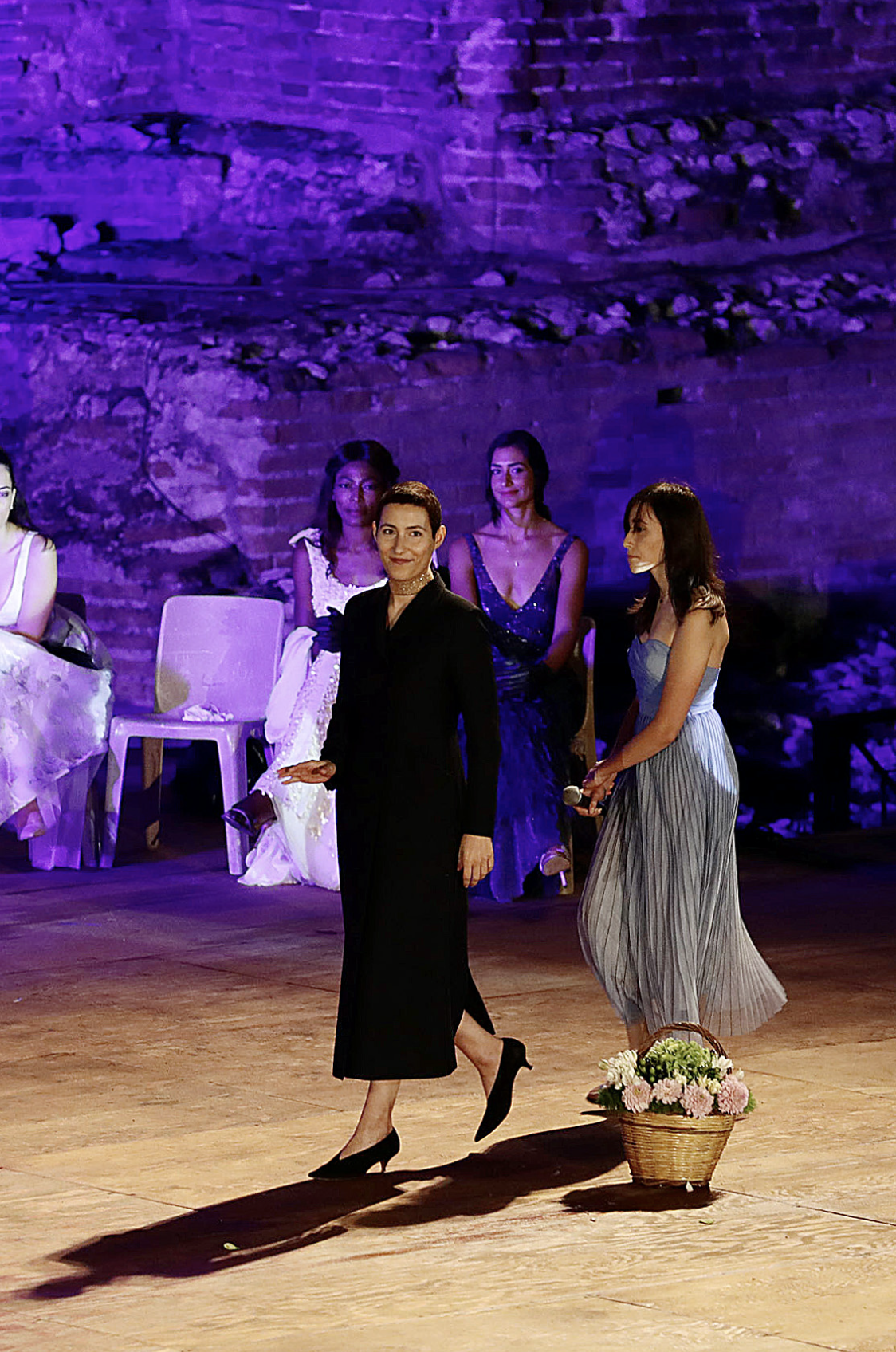
- Charlotte Dauphin at the 2020 Taormina Film Fest
- Born: 1987 (age 38–39); Paris, France
- Education: EDHEC; Royal Academy of Dramatic Arts; University of London; University of Southern California
- Occupations: director; producer; screenwriter; actress; designer
- Years active: 2010–present
- Spouse: Charles-Henri de La Rochefoucauld (m. 2012)
- Relatives: Jacques Dauphin (grandfather)
- Website: charlottedauphin.world

Charlotte Dauphin (born 1987) is a French filmmaker, performance artist, visual artist, and designer.

== Early life and education ==
Dauphin was born in Paris, France in 1987. She trained as a ballet dancer before her dance career was cut short by injury and she subsequently decided to focus on her studies. She graduated from EDHEC, University of London (Courtauld Institute of Art) and the Royal Academy of Dramatic Arts. Later, Dauphin studied filmmaking at the University of Southern California.

She is the daughter of Chantal Lajous and Laurent Dauphin. Following her father's suicide, she became the only grandchild and heir to Jacques Dauphin and Dauphin O.T.A., one of the oldest European media houses in poster art and billboard advertising.

== Career ==
=== Film career ===
Dauphin is the founder and artistic director of Dauphin Studio, home to her art practice and portfolio of works across genres including performance, visual arts, film, and design. Her work has been exhibited in film festivals around the world and in cultural institutions, such as at the Palais de Tokyo in Paris and the Serpentine Galleries in London. It is also part of the permanent collections of the MAD Museum of Paris.

In January 2020, she released her first feature film, L'Autre (The Other). It received a Best Actress Award for Àstrid Bergès-Frisbey at the Taormina Film Fest. She then performed alongside French ballet star Marie-Agnès Gillot in her short experimental film Barre and in Architect.

In 2023 she joins the international cast of Dear Paris, Marjane Satrapi’s cinematic ode to the French city. She reunites with Marie-Agnès Gillot to perform a unique representation of the experimental piece The Future of Statues at Musée de l’Orangerie.

In 2025, she directs and is the lead actress of Melpomene, her second feature film starring as Marthe opposite Marisa Berenson, Pascal Greggory, Finnegan Oldfield and Andie MacDowell.

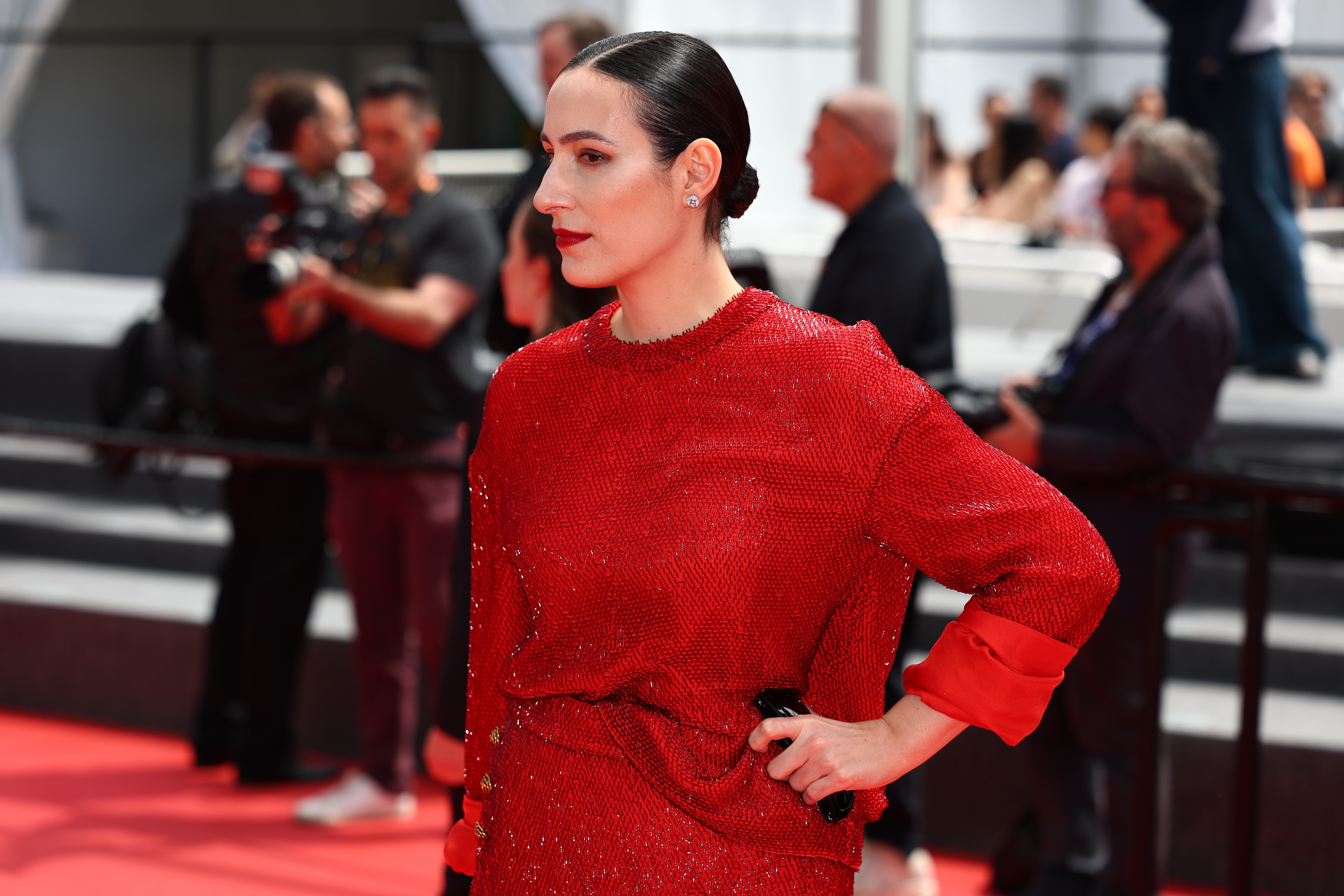
Charlotte Dauphin at the 2026 Cannes Film Festival

As a producer, she focuses on independent features and auteurs. The first feature she worked on was Dark Inclusion by Arthur Harari. It won the Louis Delluc Prize for Best Film as well as several accolades at the César Awards. Dauphin has also produced films for Mia Hansen-Løve including Bergman Island, which was an official selection of the 2021 Cannes Film Festival. She also works with filmmakers Marjane Satrapi or Scarlett Johansson for her directorial debut Eleanor the Great. In 2026, Dauphin co-produces Ryusuke Hamaguchi’s film All of A Sudden that earned the Prix d’Interprétation at the 2026 Cannes Film Festival.

=== Art and design ===
Dauphin is also internationally known for her work as a designer. Her creations are referred to as minimal and poetic with influences from dance, technology, architecture and sculpture. It has appeared on leading figures such as Billie Eilish, Susan Sarandon, Oprah Winfrey, Alicia Vikander or Juliette Binoche.

== Personal life ==
Dauphin is a member of the La Rochefoucauld family through her marriage to Charles de La Rochefoucauld. They married in a private ceremony at The Invalides on 17 March 2012.

She is a niece of fashion designer Óscar de la Renta through his wife Annette.

== Filmography ==
=== Film ===
Year	Title	Credited as				Notes
Year	Title	Director	Screenwriter	Producer	Actress	Notes
2010	An Attempt to Know More	Yes	Yes	Yes	Yes	Woman / The narrator
2015	The Matter of Time		Yes	Yes		
2016	Diamant Noir			Yes		
2018	Maya			Yes		
2020	L'Autre	Yes	Yes	Yes	Yes	Character of The Mother
2021	Bergman Island			Yes		
2022	Architect	Yes	Yes	Yes	Yes	The woman
2022	One Fine Morning			Yes		
2023	Barre	Yes	Yes	Yes	Yes	Woman in black and white
2024	Dear Paris				Yes	Christine
2024	The Future of Statues				Yes	Self
2025	Eleanor the Great			Yes		
2025	& Sons				Yes	Lucy
2025	Yakushima’s Illusion			Yes		
2026	Melpomene	Yes	Yes		Yes	Marthe
2026	Rose’s Baby			Yes	Yes	
2026	All of A Sudden			Yes		

=== Music video ===
Year	Song	Artist	Notes	Refs.
2023	"Unisex"	Mirwais	Director & Performer	

== Exhibitions ==
- The Future of Statues, Musée de l'Orangerie, Paris (2024)
