= Lauren W. Wilson =

American entrepreneur and communicator

- Born: Chesterfield, Missouri
- Known for: ColorComm

Lauren Wesley Wilson is an American entrepreneur and communicator. She is the founder and President of ColorComm.

== Early life and education ==
Wilson was born in Chesterfield, Missouri. She grew up in the suburbs of St. Louis, Missouri. Wilson is a graduate of Spelman College. She holds a Bachelor of Arts degree in Political Science with a concentration in International Relations. While at Spelman, she studied at the University of KwaZulu-Natal in Durban, South Africa. She continued her studies in Washington, D.C, where she earned a master's degree in Communications from Georgetown University. Wilson interned at D.C. agencies, Edelman and Ketchum.

== Career ==
Wilson started working at the age of 16, as a hostess at Chevy's Mexican Grill in St. Louis. Later, she worked at Hill & Knowlton, a P.R. firm, where she started ColorComm, in 2011, after seeing no diversity in leadership. Wilson went on to work at Qorvis/MSLGROUP, where she served as a Communications Strategist for several years. She left Qorvis/MSLGROUP in 2015 to lead ColorComm, Inc as CEO.

She also worked on Capitol Hill, serving as the Communications Director for Congresswoman Eddie Bernice Johnson (D-TX), and in the 2012 re-election campaign of Barack Obama at the Florida Campaign Headquarters as a Media Booker. Wilson is also a Contributor at Forbes and has a column that covers women of color in business. She also served as a juror on the Cannes Lions Jury in 2017.

=== ColorComm ===
In 2011, Wilson launched ColorComm, a national platform to advance women of color in business. She originally envisioned ColorComm as an informal group that would help each other and connect over lunches. The first-ever ColorComm Luncheon brought in 34 media professionals, all women of color, to a restaurant in Washington, D.C.

As president, Wilson oversees more than 50 partners, including The Coca-Cola Company, Toyota, AT&T, Facebook and ColorComm Media Group, the DivergeNow.com online communications industry magazine, and offices in Washington, D.C., and New York. As of 2020, ColorComm has a community of more than 40,000 professionals.

=== Awards and recognitions ===
Wilson has been listed in PR Week 40 Under 40, 93.9 WKYS 30 under 30, and P.R. Week as one of the 50 Most Powerful in P.R, Ad Age ‘Women to Watch’, The Root 100 and more. She has also featured in The Washington Post, Cosmopolitan, Forbes, Girlboss, Black Enterprise, EBONY, and more. Wilson has also been recognized by the Washington Women in P.R.’s Emerging Leader Award.

=== Bibliography ===
- What Do You Need? How Women of Color Can Take Ownership of Their Careers to Accelerate Their Path to Success (2024) ISBN 1401974899
