= Tubeuf =

Tubeuf may refer to:

== People ==
- André Tubeuf (1930–2021), French writer
- Karl von Tubeuf (1862–1941), German forestry scientist

== Other uses ==
- Hôtel Tubeuf, hotel in Paris
