= Fondation Marcel Bleustein-Blanchet =

French foundation

The Fondation Marcel Bleustein-Blanchet pour la vocation is a foundation in France that was founded in 1960, as La Fondation de la Vocation, by Marcel Bleustein-Blanchet (then president of Publicis). He had the idea to create the Foundation for Vocation, and could not doubt that it would become a veritable institution.

The Foundation is a private organization recognized public utility, intended to encourage all vocations, helping young people who (for lack of material support) are hampered in their efforts to be accomplished in a chosen profession.

Over 1,200 people have received the Foundation's prizes. Over the years, selection juries have included teachers, scientists, Nobel Prize laureates in medicine, professors at the Collège de France and the Faculty of Medicine, and members of the French Academy and the institute.

The first phase of selection consists of specialised juries according to different fields of specialisation (18 fields, in total).

Out of approximately 5,000 candidates each year, 20 scholars are awarded a Prize for Vocation.
