= Abraham Moles =

French professor (1920–1992)

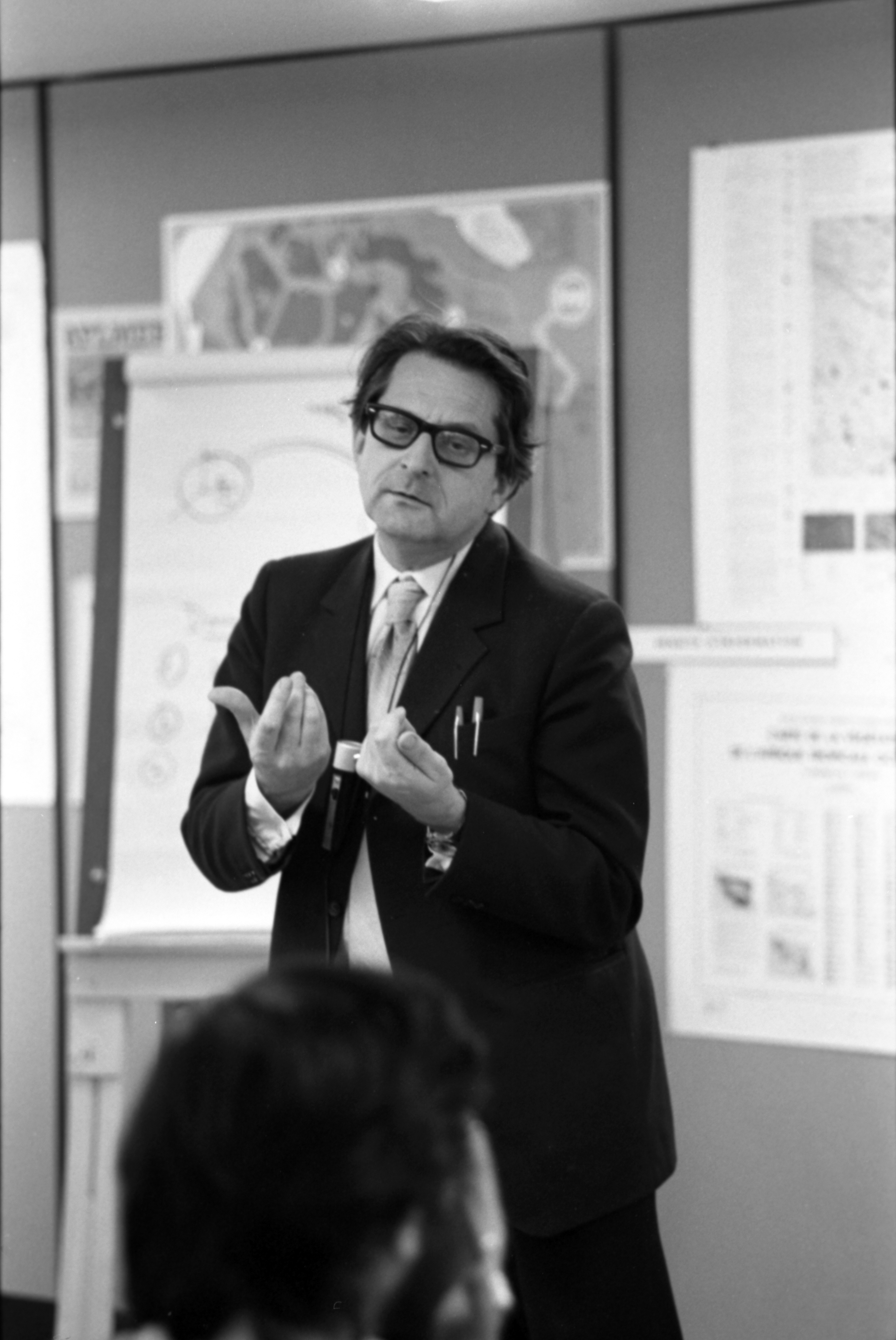
- Moles in 1972
- Born: 19 August 1920; Touzac
- Died: 22 May 1992 (aged 71); Strasbourg, France

Abraham Moles (19 August 1920 – 22 May 1992) was a pioneer in information science and communication studies in France, He was a professor at Ulm school of design and University of Strasbourg. He is known for his work on kitsch.

== Biography ==
Moles studied electrical and acoustics engineering at the University of Grenoble while preparing a bachelor in sciences of nature. He became a research assistant at the Laboratory of metal physics, under the direction of Félix Esclangon, then of Louis Néel. There he learned techniques of metal work, then electric and electronic tools. He wrote reports on material properties or technical analysis. At the end of the Second World War, he was hired by the French National Centre for Scientific Research in the Laboratory of acoustics and vibrations of Marseille, and at the CRSIM (Centre de recherche scientifique industriel et maritime).

In 1952, he obtained a PhD in physics for a thesis titled 'La structure physique du signal musical et phonétique' (under the direction of René Lucas, Edmond Bauer, Henri Pieron and the physiologist Alexandre Monnier). He then participated to the works of the Centre d’études de la radio-télévision (directed by Jean Tardieu), and was a member of Pierre Schaeffer's team. But due to his financial precarity, he accepted two grants of the Rockefeller Foundation, in order to work at Columbia University (Music Department headed by Vladimir Ussachevsky).

In 1954, he defended a second PhD, in philosophy, under the title "La création scientifique", under the direction of Bachelard.

From 1954 to 1960, Abraham Moles was the director of the Laboratoire d’électroacoustique Scherchen, in Gravesano, Switzerland. It was directed by Hermann Scherchen, one of the pioneers of Radio Berlin, who had discovered composers as famous as Luciano Berio, Iannis Xenakis, Bruno Maderna, Luigi Nono. At the same time, Abraham Moles was teaching at the University of Stuttgart (with Max Bense), of Bonn, of Berlin and of Utrecht. He was finally appointed as a full professor at the Ulm School of Design.

After 1966, he taught in Strasbourg (in the department created by Henri Lefebvre), first in sociology, then in social psychology. He created there an Institute for social psychology of communications, usually called École de Strasbourg. He developed an article "Art et ordinateur" (1970) into the book Art et ordinateur (1971), transposing the theories of Shannon to aesthetics.

His 1973 book, Théorie de l'information et perception esthétique (Information Theory and Esthetic Perception) expanded on his 1952 PhD work with music to show how an aesthetic work such as a piece of composed music was structurally made up of nested and increasingly fine sub-components which, upon auditioning, are then grouped perceptually to make a whole phrase, passage and composition. His work of this period was influential in that it allowed a link to be made between physicalist and semiotic approaches to information theory.

He is a founding member of L’Académie nationale des arts de la rue (ANAR) created in 1975 with Marcel Bleustein-Blanchet, Jacques Dauphin, Paul Delouvrier, Georges Elgozy, Roger Excoffon, Maurice Cazeneuve, and André Parinaud.

He was the president of the French Society of Cybernetics, founded by Louis Couffignal.

== Selected work ==
- Physique et technique du bruit, Paris, Dunod, 1952
- La Création scientifique, Genève, Kister, 1957
- Musiques expérimentales, Zurich, Cercle d'art, 1961
- Communications et langages, (en collaboration avec B. Vallancien), Paris, Gauthier-Villars, 1963
- Phonétique et phonation, (en collaboration avec B. Vallancien) Paris, Masson, 1966
- L'affiche dans la société urbaine, Paris, Dunod, 1969
- Créativité et méthodes d'innovation, Paris, Fayard, 1970
- Art et ordinateur, Paris, Casterman, 1971
- Psychologie du Kitsch, Paris, Denoël, 1971
- Théorie des objets, Paris, Ed. Universitaires, 1972
- Psychologie de l'espace, (En collaboration avec Élisabeth Rohmer), Paris, Casterman, 1972
- Théorie de l'information et perception esthétique, Paris, Denoël, 1973 (Information Theory and aesthetical perception)
- Sociodynamique de la culture, Paris, Mouton, 1973
- La Communication, Paris, Marabout, 1973
- Micropsychologie et vie quotidienne, (En collaboration avec Élisabeth Rohmer), Paris, Denoël, 1976
- Théorie des actes, (En collaboration avec Élisabeth Rohmer), Paris, Casterman, 1977
- L'image, communication fonctionnelle, Paris, Casterman, 1981
- Labyrinthes du vécu, Paris, Klincksieck, 1982
- Théorie structurale de la communication et société, Paris, Masson, 1986
- Les sciences de l'imprécis, (En collaboration avec Élisabeth Rohmer), Paris, Seuil, 1990
- Psychosociologie de l'espace, (En collaboration avec Élisabeth Rohmer), textes rassemblés, mis en forme et présentés par Victor Schwach, Paris, L'Harmattan, 1998

== Online texts ==
- 1992. « Vilem Flusser, un philosophe des Sudètes » [archive]. Communication et langages, nº91, p. 112-114.
- 1990 (avec Claude Lefèvre). El paisaje urbano como fuente de conocimiento [archive] (Le paysage urbain comme source de connaissances). Barcelona : Paidós.
- 1989. « Una novedad museográfica : El Museo de Antropología de Xalapa » [archive]. Graffiti, nº1
- 1988. « Dire le monde et le transcrire » [archive].Communication et langages, nº76, p. 68-77.
- 1988. « El concepte funcionalista del Bauhaus en la societat del miracle econòmic, la Hochschule für Gestaltung d'Ulm 1 » [archive]. Temes de disseny, ISSN 0213-6023, nº2 (« Diseño, Comunicación, Cultura »)
- 1986. « Livre simple, livre complexe, où se situe la fonction éditoriale ? » [archive]. Communication et langages, nº67, p. 89-104.
- 1980. « Le livre et les éditeurs » [archive]. Communication et langages, nº45, p. 82-96.
- 1979. « Quelques axiomes communicationnels de la société de masse » [archive].Communication et langages, nº41-42, p. 170-171.
- 1979. « Petite analyse du contenu des articles de Communication et langages » [archive]. Communication et langages, nº41-42, p. 7-9.
- 1978. « Biblioteca pessoal; biblioteca universal » [archive]. Revista de Biblioteconomia de Brasília, Vol. 6, nº1.
- 1978. « Structuralisme et miniature persane » [archive]. Communication et langages, nº40, p. 7-13.
- 1978. « Du sein féminin ». Senologia, vol. 3, nº2, p. 35-37
- 1978. « L'image et le texte » [archive]. Communication et langages, nº38, p. 17-29.
- 1972. « Notes pour une typologie des événements » [archive]. Communications, nº18 (« L'événement »), p. 90-96.
- 1971. « Qu'est-ce que le Kitsch ? » [archive]. Communication et langages, nº9, 1971. p. 74-87.
- 1970. « Art et ordinateur » [archive]. Communication et langages, nº7, p. 24-33.
- 1969. « Sociodynamique et politique d'équipement culturel dans la société urbaine » [archive]. Communications, nº14 (« La politique culturelle »), p. 137-149.
- 1969. « La situation sociale de l'affiche » [archive]. Communication et langages, nº4, p. 73-82.
- 1969. « Objet et communication » [archive]. Communications, nº13 (« Les objets »), p. 1-21.
- 1969. « Théorie de la complexité et civilisation industrielle » [archive]. Communications, nº13 (« Les objets »), p. 51-63.
- 1969. « Kitsch et objet » [archive]. Communications, nº13 (« Les objets »), p. 105-129.
- 1966. « La radio-télévision au service de la promotion socio-culturelle » [archive]. Communications, nº7 (« Radio-télévision : réflexions et recherches »). p. 1-10.
- 1966. « Liberté principale, liberté marginale, liberté interstitielle » [archive]. Revue française de sociologie, vol. 7, nº2. p. 229-232.
- 1965. « Produkte: ihre funktionelle und strukturelle Komplexität » [archive]. Allgemeine Designtheorie. paru en 1961 en français « La notion de quantité en cybernétique ». Les études philosophiques. Nº2 (avril-juin).

== Conference ==
- 1986. « L'expérience du Bauhaus après la Deuxième Guerre Mondiale: l'École d'Ulm » [archive]. Conférence donnée à la VII^{e} Setmana Cultural de l'ETSAB (10-13 février 1986). Malgré les problèmes techniques. En français, avec traduction espagnole.

== Other works ==
- 1952. Physique et technique du bruit, Paris, Dunod
- 1957. La création scientifique, Genève, Kister
- 1961. Musiques expérimentales, Zurich, Cercle d'art
- 1963. Communications et langages (en collaboration avec B. Vallancien), Paris, Gauthier-Villars
- 1966. Phonétique et phonation (en collaboration avec B. Vallancien) Paris, Masson
- 1969. L'affiche dans la société urbaine, Paris, Dunod
- 1970. Créativité et méthodes d'innovation, Paris, Fayard
- 1971. Art et ordinateur, Paris, Casterman
- 1971. La communication, Les dictionnaires du savoir moderne (ouvrage collectif sous la direccion d'Abraham Moles et Claude Zeltmann), Paris
- 1972. Théorie des objets, Paris, Éditions universitaires
- 1972. Psychologie de l'espace (en collaboration avec Élisabeth Rohmer), Paris, Casterman
- 1973. Théorie de l'information et perception esthétique, Paris, Denoël
- 1973. Sociodynamique de la culture, Paris, Mouton
- 1973. La communication, Paris, Marabout
- 1976. Micropsychologie et vie quotidienne (en collaboration avec Élisabeth Rohmer), Paris, Denoël
- 1977. Théorie des actes (en collaboration avec Élisabeth Rohmer), Paris, Casterman
- 1981. L'image, communication fonctionnelle, Paris, Casterman
- 1982. Labyrinthes du vécu, Paris, Klincksieck
- 1986. Théorie structurale de la communication et société, Paris, Masson
- 1990. Les sciences de l'imprécis (en collaboration avec Élisabeth Rohmer), Paris, Seuil
- 1998. Psychosociologie de l'espace (en collaboration avec Élisabeth Rohmer), textes rassemblés, mis en forme et présentés par Victor Schwach, Paris, L'Harmattan

== Notes and references ==
1. ↑ Notice d'autorité personne [archive] sur le site du catalogue général de la BnF
2. ↑ Cf. Martial Robert, 1999, p. 138. Pierre Schaeffer, des transmissions à Orphée. Paris, L'Harmattan, 416 p.
3. ↑ https://web.archive.org/web/20150220050452/http://www.esprit68.org/misere.html [archive]
4. ↑ catalogue.bibliothequedesociologie.cnrs.fr [archive]
