= Schwartz MSL =

- Company type: Private
- Industry: public relations
- Founded: 1990
- Founder: Steve Schwartz, Paula Mae Schwartz
- Fate: Merged with MSLGROUP
- Headquarters: Waltham, Massachusetts, United States
- Number of locations: 4
- Number of employees: >200
- Parent: Publicis Groupe
- Website: www.mslgroup.com

Schwartz MSL, formerly Schwartz Communications was a public relations agency based in Waltham, Massachusetts. It was acquired in 2011 by French multinational advertising and public relations group Publicis Group, and in 2014 was fully absorbed into Publicis Group's MSLGROUP subsidiary.

== History ==
Schwartz Communications was founded in 1990 by Steve and Paula Mae Schwartz.Prior to founding the firm, Steve served as a speechwriter for General Electric’s CEO Jack Welch.

The company started out as a general public relations firm, for example running a marketing campaign for Gerber baby food, before specializing on technology and healthcare companies. The company established an office in San Francisco in 1996 and on November 1, 2006, Schwartz opened their third office at Stockholm. In 2007, they established a location in London.

In March 2009, Steve Schwartz stepped down as President of the firm and named Bryan Scanlon as his replacement. Scanlon has been with the firm since 1997 and most recently ran the company’s San Francisco office. Schwartz continues to hold the title of CEO. Schwartz also announced in March 2009 that its chief financial officer, Ari Millstein, would assume the additional role of chief operating officer, once held by Paula Mae Schwartz, who now serves as the firm’s "chief people officer". Schwartz explained that the changes were made so the couple could focus on their film production company, "Chockstone Pictures".

In 2011 the firm was acquired by MSLGROUP, a large PR firm owned by Publicis Groupe. The firm's name was changed to Schwartz MSL.

In 2014, the agency was completely absorbed into MSLGROUP.

== Clients ==
In addition to its Waltham headquarters, Schwartz had offices in San Francisco, London and Stockholm. The firm specialized in PR for the high-tech, medical device, pharmaceutical and biotechnology companies.

Schwartz served 78 clients in 1998. By 2006, this number was reported to have grown to over 170 clients.

Clients of Schwartz included Staples, and Lycos.

== Recognition ==
In 1997, it was described as the "fastest-growing high-tech PR agency" by Inside PR. In 2009, Schwartz was awarded 13 "bells" at the 40th annual Bell Ringer Awards.
