= Jacques Dauphin =

French advertising pioneer (1923–1994)

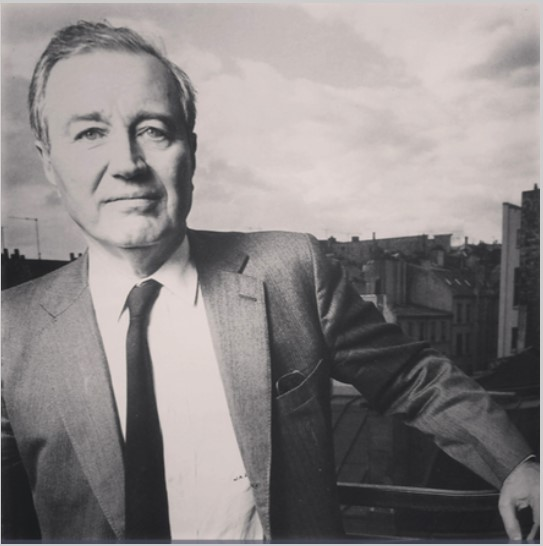
- Born: 4 July 1923; Paris, France
- Died: 1 April 1994 (aged 70); Paris, France
- Education: Lycée Condorcet
- Alma mater: HEC Paris
- Children: 1
- Relatives: Charlotte Dauphin (granddaughter)
- Website: dauphin-ota.info

Jacques Dauphin (July 4, 1923 – April 1, 1994) was a French advertising pioneer founder and CEO of Dauphin OTA. He is best known as the father of modern billboard advertising.

== Early life and education ==
After graduating with a law degree from Faculte de droit de Paris and from HEC Paris, Jacques Dauphin re-opened the Parisian-based office created by his father Eugene Dauphin in 1921 who closed it during WWII to prevent any collaboration with the Nazis. He then developed the company to a broader scale after the French Liberation expanding its activities (mainly billboard advertising and radio) worldwide, including the UK, Belgium, Italy, Spain, Canada, and the Caribbean. Jacques Dauphin has notably created and developed the 4x3 format that remains today the international standard format used in billboard advertising worldwide.

== Career ==
His professional achievements have been honoured in several occasions and he has successively occupied the following positions: president (1958 - 1966) of the national outdoor advertising federations of France, Germany, Belgium, Finland, Italy and the Netherlands best known as FEPE that he created and the International Advertising Association. He was then vice-president (1969), president (1972 - 1974), and honorary president of the French Chambers of advertising. He presided the 3rd World Congress of Outdoor Advertising in London in 1972. He was a member of the International Commission « Publicité distribution » of the International Chamber of Commerce, and co-president of Grand prix international de l´affichage. He has been made Knight of the Legion of Honour and Knight of the Ordre des Arts et des Lettres by the French authorities.

Dauphin broadens his interests in other media, particularly in radio, television and film. in 1978, Jacques Dauphin takes over Radio Caraïbes International with his friend the American journalist and politician Pierre Salinger.

== Personal Interests ==
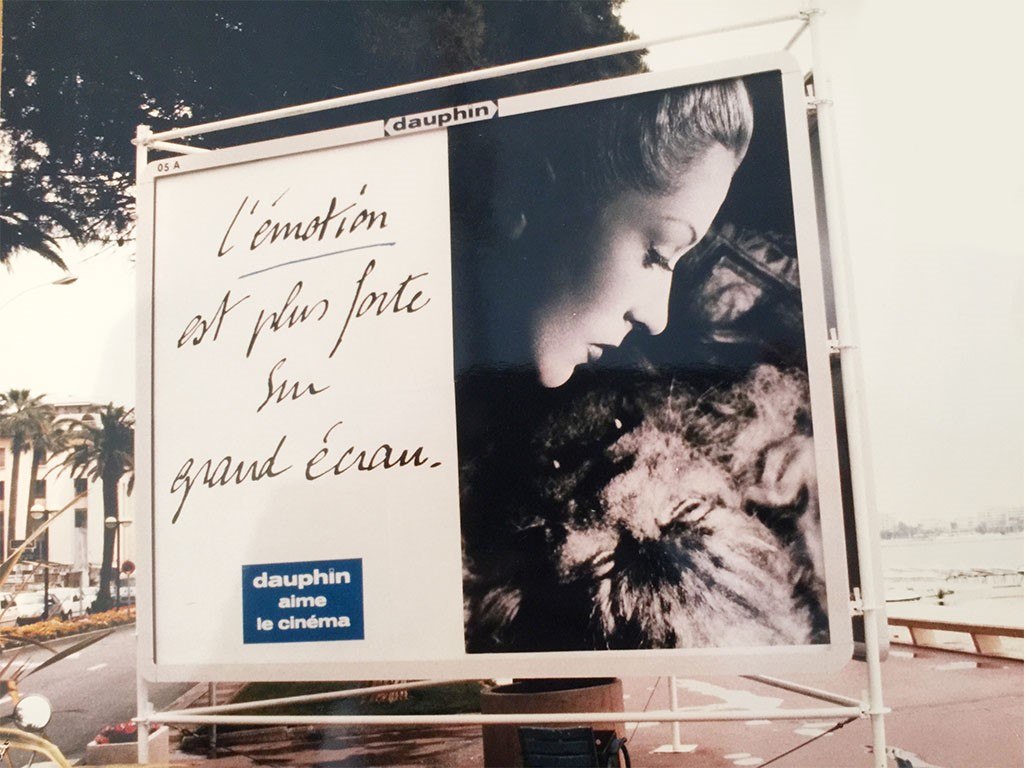
Dauphin’s campaign and billboard advertising in support of the Cannes Film Festival - 1989

Through Dauphin OTA Jacques Dauphin was also particularly active in the promotion of the arts and image.

He notably promoted the Cannes Film Festival. Dauphin was one of the historical official partner of the film festival. The company provided an extra support to the winner of the Caméra d'Or by offering a national billboard advertising campaign in support of the winning first feature film. Dauphin also notably supported the French International Contemporary Art Fair best known as FIAC.

Through Dauphin, Jacques Dauphin has commissioned and inspired various artists, such as Daniel Buren or François Morellet among others.

He is a founding member of L’Académie nationale des arts de la rue (ANAR) created in 1975 with Marcel Bleustein-Blanchet, Maurice Cazeneuve, Paul Delouvrier, Georges Elgozy, Roger Excoffon, Abraham Moles, and André Parinaud.

Jacques Dauphin has turned billboard advertising into a popular art form, a witness of the contemporary society, and one of the leading media of the 20th century in Europe.

== Other facts ==
After the tragic death of his only son Laurent in 1988, and due to the young age of his only granddaughter Charlotte, Jacques Dauphin had no heir to take up the business.

After Jacques Dauphin died in 1994, it has been decided that Dauphin billboard advertising would subsequently be sold. The American conglomerate Clear Channel acquired Dauphin OTA in 1999. The company became an emblematic part of its outdoor communication division.

His only heiress is his only granddaughter Charlotte Dauphin who has married Comte Charles-Henri de La Rochefoucauld in 2012 in Saint-Louis des Invalides cathedral in Paris, France.

Jacques Dauphin's life and career, his personality, leadership, and his passion for sailing have inspired French film director Claude Lelouch for his film Itinerary of a Spoiled Child and its lead character Sam Lion.

== Interviews ==
1. Jacques Dauphin CEO of advertising company La France défigurée - 19/07/1971

== See also ==
- Charlotte Dauphin
- Out-of-home advertising
