= Badinter =

Badinter is a surname. Notable people with the name include:

- Efim Badinter (1933–2013), Moldovan and Soviet scientist and engineer
- Élisabeth Badinter (born 1944), French philosopher, author and historian
- Robert Badinter (1928–2024), French lawyer, politician and author
