= Maurice Lévy (Publicis) =

French businessman (born 1942)

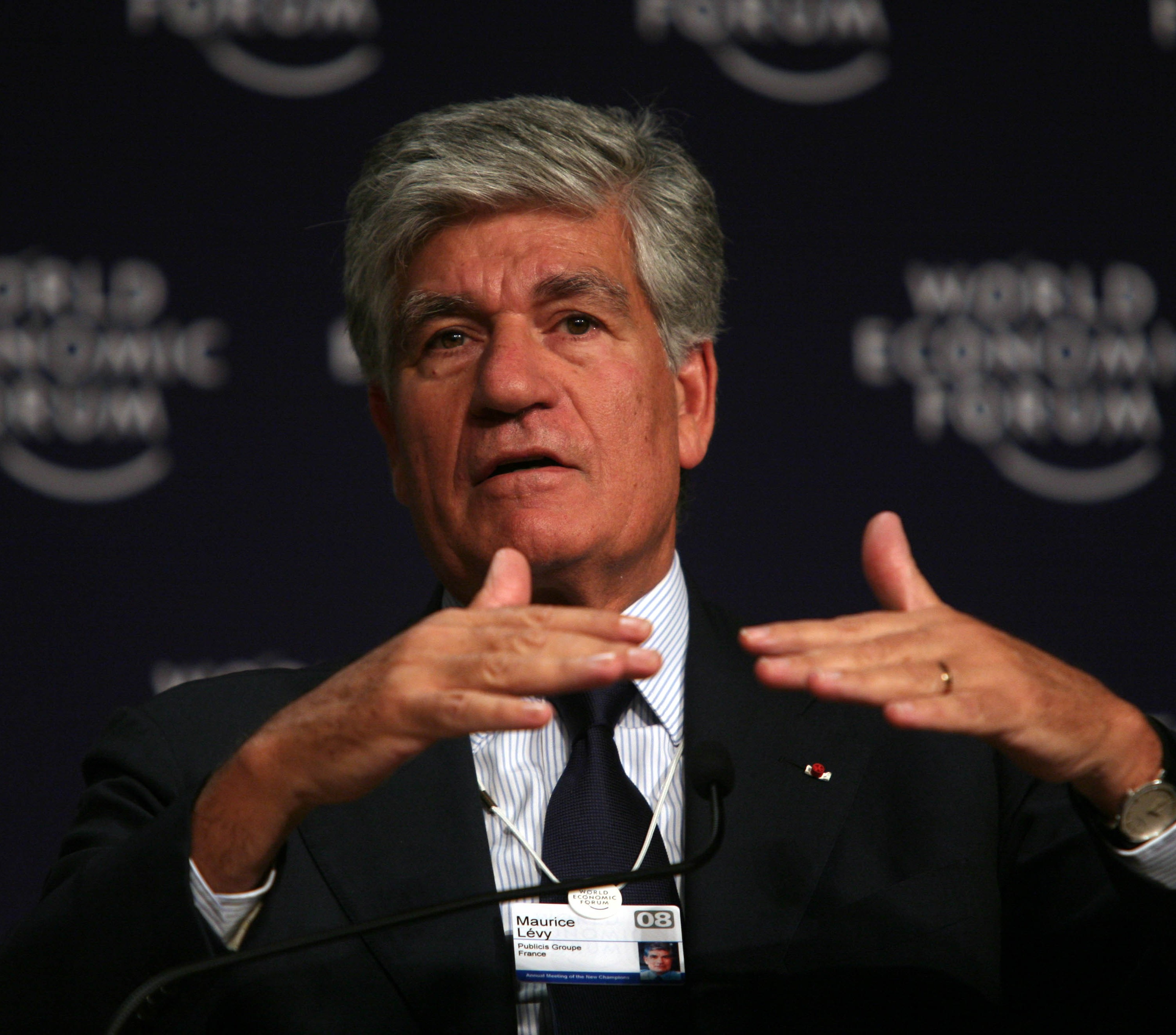
- Lévy at the World Economic Forum in Tianjin, China, 2008
- Born: February 18, 1942 (age 84); Oujda, French protectorate in Morocco
- Education: New Jersey City University
- Occupations: Chairman of the Supervisory Board, Publicis Groupe, Publicis
- Term: 2017-2021
- Predecessor: Marcel Bleustein-Blanchet
- Successor: Arthur Sadoun

Maurice Lévy (Arabic: موريس ليفي) is a French-Moroccan businessman. Since 1984, he has served as Chairman of the Supervisory Board of Publicis Groupe, the world's third largest advertising and communications group. Founded in 1926, Publicis Groupe counts today over 80,000 employees and is present in over 100 countries around the world.

== Career ==
Lévy joined Publicis in 1971, as the Director of IT. He very quickly moved into the heart of the agency's business: advertising and marketing. Recognizing that top clients require a full range of communications services, he began to build up a comprehensive group of specialized and general service agencies and subsidiaries in France and throughout Europe.

Lévy oversaw the Groupe’s international development, leading an expansion program that extended Publicis Groupe's operations to 108, where it offers clients communication, marketing and media services.

He became Chairman of Publicis Conseil, the founding agency of the Groupe, in 1984, and was later named CEO of Publicis Groupe in 1987, thus becoming the company's second CEO since 1926, after Marcel Bleustein-Blanchet.

Lévy launched the annual technology conference, Viva Technology, in 2016 and has continued to lead the following editions.

In 2017, Lévy replaced Elisabeth Badinter as chairman of the supervisory board and was succeeded as CEO by Arthur Sadoun.

== Recognition ==
Lévy has been honored with numerous distinctions and accolades for his contributions to media, business leadership, and tolerance. On 6 November 2007, he was among the guests invited to the state dinner hosted by U.S. President George W. Bush in honor of President Nicolas Sarkozy at the White House.

== Personal life ==
Born in 1942 in Oudja, Morocco, Lévy has been married for over fifty years, and has three sons and six grandchildren. His interests include modern and contemporary art, antiques, chess and skiing.
