= Tony Weisman =

American marketing executive

- Born: 1960 (age 65–66); Chicago, United States
- Education: Brown University and Northwestern University
- Occupation: Marketing executive
- Known for: Was the Chief Marketing Officer of Dunkin' Donuts North America
- Spouse: Tracy Weisman
- Children: 2

Tony Weisman (born 1960) is an American marketing executive who is the CEO of SnapPoint. From 2017 to 2019, he was Chief Marketing Officer of Dunkin' Donuts North America.

== Early life and education ==
Weisman was born and raised in Chicago, and graduated from Brown University with a Bachelor of Arts in Political Science. He completed additional executive education at Northwestern University. He is an avid sailor on Lake Michigan.

== Career ==
He spent about 19 years at ad agency Leo Burnett Worldwide, holding various management positions and leading work on high-profile consumer brands.

Weisman was appointed as chief growth officer at DraftFCB Chicago. In 2006, he was removed from his position after the ad agency lost the $580 million Walmart account and was barred from participating in the new agency search.

In 2007 Weisman joined advertising agency Digitas and in 2013 was elevated to Chief Executive Officer (North America) at DigitasLBi. While CEO he served as a member of its Global Executive Board and reported to Luke Taylor, global CEO of DigitasLBi. He replaced Colin Kinsella.

Tony Weisman was appointed on Sept 5, 2017 as the new Chief Marketing Officer of Dunkin' Donuts North America. During his tenure he was responsible for rebranding the company by dropping 'Donuts' from its name and helping the chain with its espresso launch and the test of its plant-based breakfast sandwich. He left Dunkin' on Dec 1, 2019.

== Recognition ==
In 2005, he has received a Silver Medal, an award from Chicago Advertising Federation.
