= Publicis Health =

Healthcare communications network

- Formerly: Publicis Healthcare Communications Group
- Company type: Subsidiary
- Industry: Marketing
- Predecessor: Digitas Health and Razorfish Health
- Founded: 2003; 22 years ago
- Headquarters: New York City, United States
- Products: Public relations
- Owner: Publicis Group
- Number of employees: 5,500 (2013)
- Website: publicishealth.com

Publicis Health is an American multinational healthcare marketing, public relations and communications network which consists of around 12 agency brands in more than 60 offices located in 10 countries. The company is a division of French global marketing company Publicis Group.

Its agencies include brands Saatchi & Saatchi Wellness, Digitas Health LifeBrands, Discovery, Publicis Life Brands, Publicis Health Media, Publicis Touchpoint Solutions, and in-sync Strategy, as well as regional brands. In 2014, Advertising Age ranked Publicis Health as the largest U.S. healthcare communications network by revenue.

Publicis Health agencies offer clients advertising, medical education, sales and marketing, digital, market access, and medical and scientific affairs. They have around 5,500 employees.

== History ==
Publicis Healthcare Communications Group (PHCG) was established in 2003 as the first healthcare-specific network in communications. Global clients include Pfizer, Sanofi, AstraZeneca, Merck, Procter & Gamble, Boehringer Ingelheim and Roche.

In October 2011, it was announced that Publicis Groupe agencies Digitas Health and Razorfish Health would become part of the PHCG network. Digitas Health and Razorfish Health will operate as stand-alone brands, run by co-Presidents Michael du Toit and Alexandra von Plato.

In January 2013, PHCG announced the creation of Publicis Health Media. Matt McNally was named President of PHM and will lead the business unit for PHCG.

In October 2013, Publicis Groupe announced that Heartbeat Ideas and Heartbeat West will join the PHCG network as a Saatchi & Saatchi Health entity. The current New York based Saatchi & Saatchi group - comprising Saatchi & Saatchi Wellness and Saatchi & Saatchi Health Communications - will merge, and be known as Saatchi & Saatchi Wellness. Heartbeat and its sister agency will now operate under "Heartbeat Ideas, a member of Saatchi & Saatchi Wellness," and "Heartbeat West, a member of Saatchi & Saatchi Wellness."

In February 2024, Publicis Health agreed to a $350M settlement over claims that it helped Purdue Pharma fuel the opioid crisis.

In 2017, the company renamed from Publicis Healthcare Communications Group to Publicis Health and the following year named Alexandra von Plato as its CEO. In 2025, the company acquired New Jersey based medical communication group p-value Group.
