= Bertrand d'Astorg =

French poet and writer

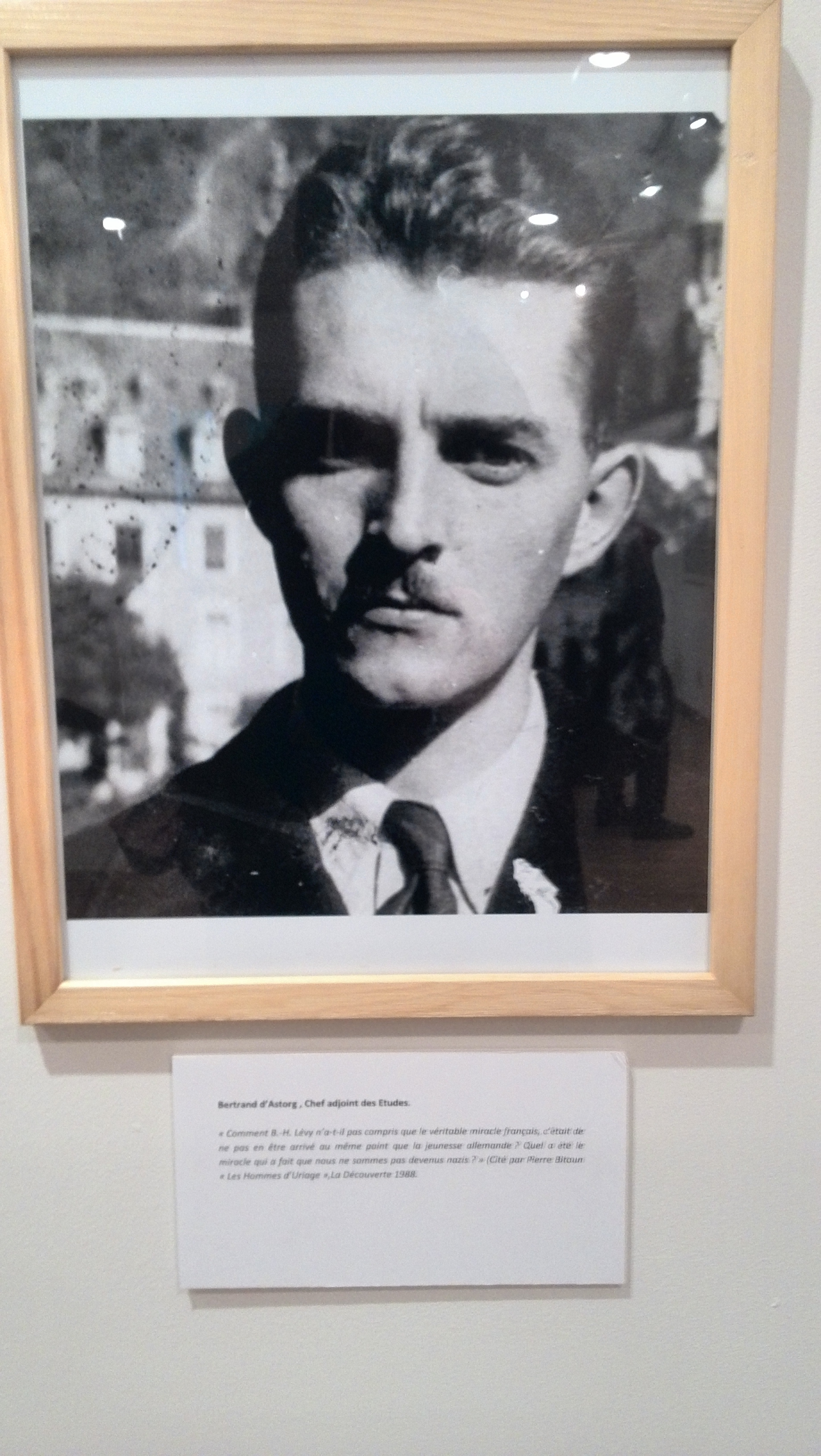
- Portrait of d'Astorg at the Uriage cadre school
- Born: 7 November 1913; Pau, France
- Died: 21 October 1988 (aged 74); Paris, France
- Occupations: Poet; Writer

Bertrand d'Astorg (7 November 1913 – 21 October 1988) was a 20th-century French poet and writer.

== Works ==
- 1945: Introduction au monde de la Terreur Éditions du Seuil, ISBN 2020025558
- 1952: Aspects de la littérature européenne depuis 1945, ISBN 978-0320063268
- 1953: D’amour et d'amitié : poèmes 1934-1952
- 1963: Le Mythe de la dame à la licorne.
- 1966: Un retour imprévu du Cosmos, ou l’Ange et le sauvage (radio play)
- 1971: Le mystère de Salomé on Revue des deux mondes
- 1980: Les noces orientales : essai sur quelques formes féminines dans l’imaginaire occidental, Prix de l'essai
- 1982: Exercices
- 1990: Variations sur l’interdit majeur : littérature et inceste en Occident Éditions Gallimard; series: Connaissance de l'Inconscient, ISBN 978-2070718474

== Studies on the author ==
- 1990: Richard Blin, Le Modelé de l'imaginaire (Pour saluer Bertrand d'Astorg), La Nouvelle Revue française, issue 453, Octobre
- 2000: Jean-Luc Pouliquen, Les Pierres Vives de Bertrand d’Astorg, Thélème: Revista complutense de estudios franceses, issue 23, autumn 2008, Madrid, ISSN 1139-9368.
