= Prix de l'essai =

The Prix de l'essai is an annual French essay prize awarded by the Académie française. It was created in 1971 by the Fondation Broquette-Gonin. It is awarded for an individual essay or for the collected works of an essayist. The prize sum was 1000 euros in 2015.

== Laureates ==
The following have received the prize:

- 1971: Roger Judrin, Journal d'une monade et autres essais.
- 1972: Paul Veyne, Writing History (Comment on écrit l'histoire).
- 1973: Marthe Robert, Origins of the Novel (Roman des origines et origines du roman).
- 1974: Étiemble, Essais de littérature (vraiment) générale.
- 1975: Jules Monnerot, Inquisitions.
- 1976: Pierre Flottes, Histoire de la poésie politique et sociale en France de 1815 à 1939.
- 1977: André Glucksmann, The Master Thinkers (Les Maîtres penseurs).
- 1978: Alain de Benoist, Vu de droite. Anthologie critique des idées contemporaines.
- 1979: Georges Elgozy, De l'humour.
- 1980: Bertrand d'Astorg, Les noces orientales.
- 1981: Alain Besançon, Ensemble de son œuvre.
- 1982: Pierre Andreu, Vie et mort de Max Jacob.
- 1983: François George, Histoire personnelle de la France.
- 1984: Myriam Cendrars, Blaise Cendrars.
- 1985: Jean-Marie Rouart, Ils ont choisi la nuit.
- 1986: René Pomeau, D'Arouet à Voltaire.
- 1987: Paule Constant, Un monde à l'usage des demoiselles.
- 1988: Claude Arnaud, Chamfort, a Biography (Chamfort).
- 1989: Pierre Assouline, Albert Londres, vie et mort d'un grand reporter.
- 1990: Jean Cazeneuve, Les Hasards d'une vie, Des Primitifs aux téléspectateurs.
- 1991: Luc Fraisse, L'Œuvre cathédrale, Proust et l'architecture médiévale.
- 1992: Marc Fumaroli, L'État culturel, essai sur une religion moderne.
- 1993: Alain Etchegoyen, La Démocratie malade du mensonge.
- 1994: Richard Millet, Le Sentiment de la langue.
- 1995: Alain Duhamel, La Politique imaginaire.
- 1995: Claude Imbert, Par Bonheur.
- 1996: Éric Roussel, Jean Monnet.
- 1997: Alain-Gérard Slama, La Régression démocratique.
- 1998: Mona Ozouf, La Muse démocratique. Henry James ou les pouvoirs du roman.
- 1999: Philippe Berthier, La Vie quotidienne dans la Comédie humaine de Balzac.
- 2000: Florence Delay, Dit Nerval.
- 2001: Belinda Cannone, L'Écriture du désir.
- 2002: Pierre Schneider, Petite Histoire de l'infini en peinture.
- 2003: Jean Clair, Court Traité des sensations, et Du surréalisme considéré dans ses rapports au totalitarisme et aux tables tournantes.
- 2004: Pierre Lepape, Le Pays de la Littérature.
- 2005: Olivier Pétré-Grenouilleau, Les Traites négrières.
- 2006: Charles Dantzig, Dictionnaire égoïste de la littérature française.
- 2007: Philippe Barthelet, Baraliptons.
- 2008: Claude Delay, Giacometti, Alberto et Diego. L'histoire cachée.
- 2009: André Tubeuf, Ludwig van Beethoven.
- 2010: Alain Finkielkraut, Un cœur intelligent.
- 2011: Marie-Claude Chaudonneret and Sébastien Allard, Le Suicide de Gros.
- 2012: Alain Bonfand, Le Cinéma d'Akira Kurosawa and for his collected works as an essayist.
- 2013: Jacques de Saint Victor, Un pouvoir invisible. Les mafias et la société démocratique (XIXe–XXIe siècle).
- 2014: Chantal Thomas, Un air de liberté. Variations sur l'esprit du XVIIIe siècle et l'ensemble de ses écrits sur le XVIIIe siècle
- 2015: Christiane Rancé, La Passion de Thérèse d'Avila
- 2016: Alain de Vulpian, Éloge de la métamorphose
- 2016: Francis Kaplan, complete works
- 2017: Jacques Henric, Boxe
- 2018: Georges Corm, La Nouvelle Question d’Orient
