= Vusi Thembekwayo =

South African businessman and author

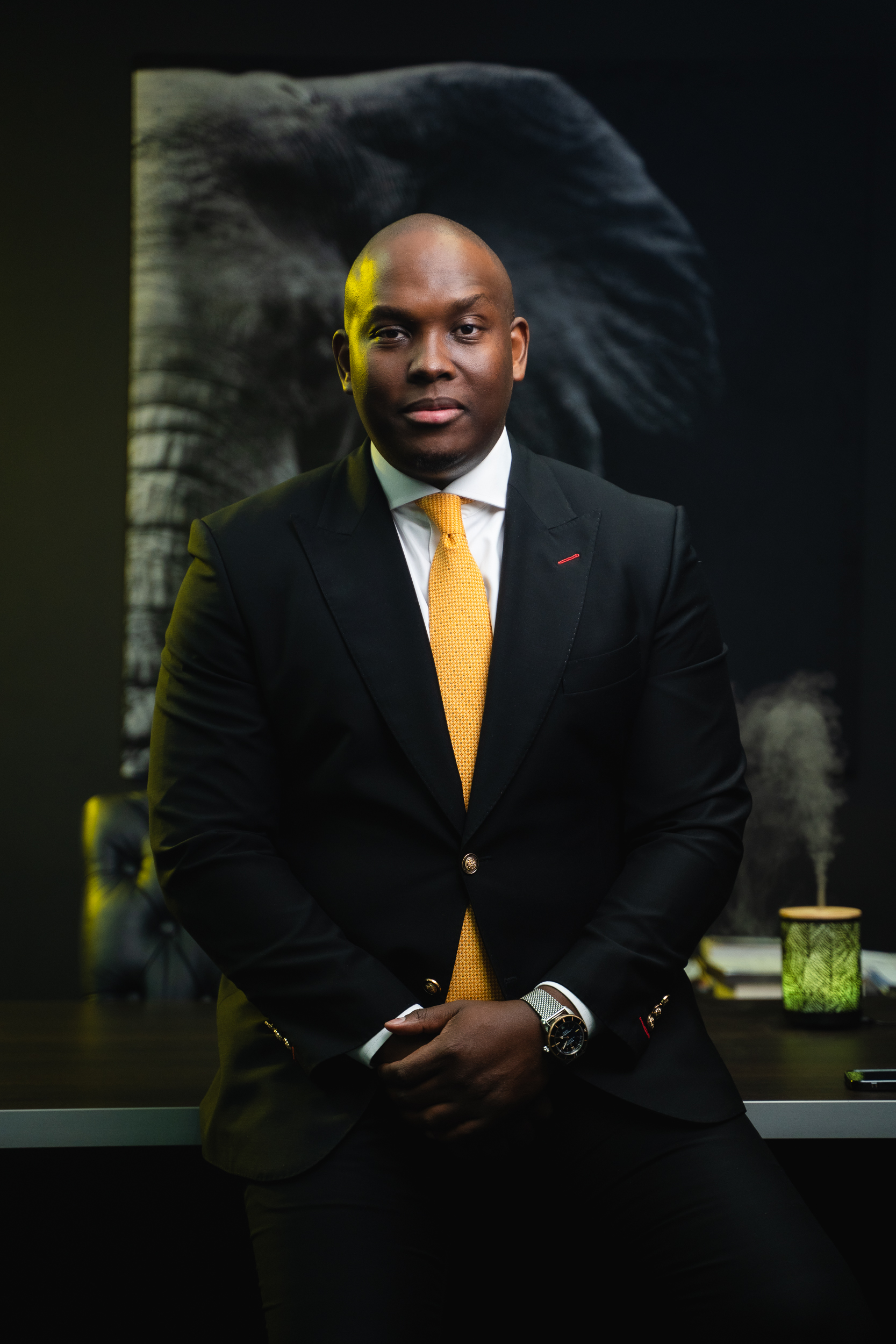
- Born: 21 March 1985 (age 41); Benoni, Gauteng, South Africa
- Citizenship: South African
- Education: University of the Witwatersrand
- Occupations: Entrepreneur, investor, speaker, leader, author, businessman
- Website: vusithembekwayo.com

Vusi Thembekwayo (born 21 March 1985) is a South African entrepreneur, investor, and author. He is the founder and CEO of MyGrowthFund Venture Partners.

By his late twenties, he had delivered over 200 presentations across 21 countries and was involved in multiple business ventures operating across African markets. He is the author of two books.

== Early life and education ==
Thembekwayo was born in Benoni on the East Rand of Transvaal province of South Africa. On completion of his secondary education, he then enrolled at the University of Witwatersrand where he studied Management Advanced Programme and commerce. He then did a postgraduate diploma in Business Administration from the Gordon Institute of Business Science (GIBS). He also did an executive MBA in Business and Economics from Ashridge Executive Education and Hult International Business School.

== Career ==
Thembekwayo began his professional career in public speaking and consulting. At age 21, he founded a forensic marketing agency, before transitioning into international speaking engagements focused on business strategy, leadership, and sales.

He later expanded into venture capital and private equity, founding MyGrowthFund Venture Partners, an investment firm focused on supporting high-growth small and medium-sized enterprises (SMEs) across Africa. Through the firm, he has been involved in initiatives such as incubator programmes and the School of Scale, a training and development platform for entrepreneurs.

In a 2015 interview with Forbes Africa, Thembekwayo reflected on early career challenges, including a 2011 investment in a steel company that failed due to insufficient due diligence. He has since emphasized the importance of legal and structural frameworks in business, stating that entrepreneurs must ensure "the legal side holds water" before proceeding with investments.

From 2014 to 2015, Thembekwayo was one of the investors, or "dragons" on South Africa's Dragons' Den reality TV series by Mzansi Magic with other dragons including Vinny Lingham, Gil Oved, Lebo Gunguluza among others.

== Personal life ==
Thembekwayo married Palesa Mahlolo Thembekwayo (née Makhetha) in 2009; the couple has three children.

In 2021, he was accused of physical assault by his wife, an allegation he denied. As of early 2023, divorce and property settlement proceedings were reported as ongoing.

In March 2024, he was acquitted of the charge by the Randburg Magistrate’s Court.

== Controversies ==
In 2023, Thembekwayo made a controversial statement and later apologised to the family of slain rapper Kiernan "AKA" Forbes for using his name for "cheap political point-scoring".

== Awards ==
- 2020 – GQ Business Leader of the Year
- 2024 – Guardian Award at the EMY Africa Awards
- 2025 – District 74 Communication and Leadership Award

== Bibliography ==
- Thembekwayo, Vusi (2017). Vusi: Business & Life Lessons from a Black Dragon. Tafelberg Publishers Ltd. ISBN 978-0624077718.
- Thembekwayo, Vusi (2018). The Magna Carta of Exponentiality. Iconoclasts Knowledge Bureau.
- Thembekwayo, Vusi. Underdogs.

=== Audiobooks ===
- Vusi: Business & Life Lessons from a Black Dragon (2019) narrated by Hanyani Mangwani on Audible, Amazon, ASIN B07S2YRLKP and iTunes.
