= The Creative Counsel =

South African advertising agency

- Company type: Private
- Industry: Advertising Agency
- Founded: 2001
- Founder: Gil Oved, Ran Neu-Ner
- Headquarters: Johannesburg, South Africa
- Number of locations: Africa, Middle East and Europe
- Services: Advertising, brand activation, digital, design
- Website: www.creativecounsel.co.za

The Creative Counsel is a South African advertising agency founded in 2001 by school friends Gil Oved and Ran Neu-Ner.

== Overview ==
The company grew to become one of South Africa's largest advertising agencies (by staff and turnover), one of South Africa's largest private first-time employers, and South Africa's top marketing, media and advertising company.

== Acquisition ==
In 2015 the company was acquired by the Publicis Group in a deal estimated to be worth over R1.5-billion. The sale was reported as the largest business transaction in Africa and the largest agency buyout in South African history.
