= Angels of Sex =

- Directed by: Xavier Villaverde
- Written by: Ana Maroto
- Produced by: Pancho Casal; Jordi Mendieta; Bob Costa; Leonel Vieira
- Starring: Álvaro Cervantes; Àstrid Bergès-Frisbey; Llorenç González
- Cinematography: Sergi Gallardo
- Edited by: Guillermo Represa
- Music by: Eduardo Molinero
- Distributed by: IFC Midnight
- Release date: 4 March 2012 (Miami International Film Festival)
- Running time: 106 minutes
- Country: Spain
- Languages: Spanish; Catalan
- Box office: $54,405

Angels of Sex (Spanish: El Sexo de los Ángeles) is a 2012 Spanish film by Xavier Villaverde starring Álvaro Cervantes, Àstrid Bergès-Frisbey, and Llorenç González. It was released in 2012 (the UK release title is The Sex of Angels).

== Plot ==
Bruno, a struggling student, loves his girlfriend Carla but discovers a new side to himself when he meets a street dancer named Rai. A new generation navigates bisexuality, torn affections, and open relationships in a steamy love triangle. The movie depicts a polyamorous bisexual relationship and love triangle between Bruno, Rai and Carla.

== Cast ==
- Álvaro Cervantes as Rai
- Àstrid Bergès-Frisbey as Carla
- Llorenç González as Bruno
- Lluïsa Castell as Carla's mother
- Marc García-Coté as Adrián
- Ricard Farré as Oscar
- Sonia Méndez as Marta
- Julieta Marocco as María
- Marc Pociello as Dani

== Reception ==
The film has been cited as an example of sexual fluidity in recent queer European cinema.

== Location ==
The film was shot at and is set in various locations around Barcelona.

== See also ==
- Discussing the sex of angels, the scholastic question from which the title is derived
