= Marcel Bleustein-Blanchet =

French businessman (1906–1996)

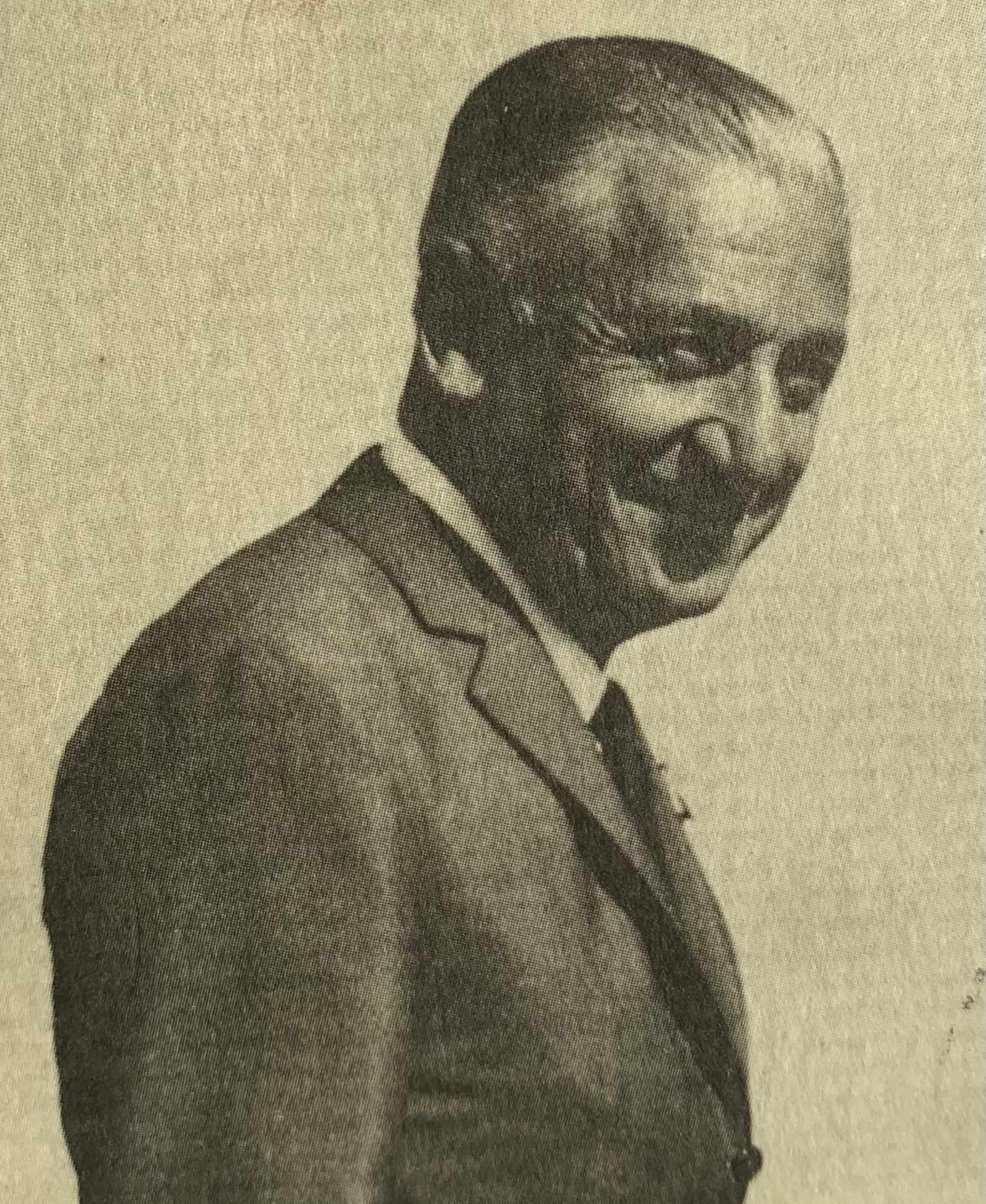
- Bleustein-Blanchet in the 1980s
- Born: 21 August 1906; Enghien-les-Bains, France
- Died: 11 April 1996 (aged 89); Paris, France
- Known for: Founder of Publicis
- Spouse: Sophie Vaillant
- Children: 3, (including Élisabeth Badinter)
- Relatives: Robert Badinter (son-in-law)

Marcel Bleustein-Blanchet (21 August 1906 – 11 April 1996) was a French entrepreneur and advertising magnate best known as the founder of Publicis Groupe.

He is also credited with inventing radio advertising in France, helped create the first French opinion polls, introduced Édith Piaf to the French public, and fought with the Free French forces during World War II.

== Early life ==
Born the youngest of nine, he was the son of Abraham Bleustein, a poor Russian-Jewish used furniture salesman in northern Paris, Marcel Bleustein left school at the age of 12 to help out in the family furniture business.

He founded Publicis in 1926 in a small apartment above a butcher's shop. In 1935, he purchased Radio LL from the radio manufacturer Lucien Lévy. He renamed it Radio Cité, and introduced France's first news broadcasts as well as its first radio jingles. Radio Cité also helped launch singer Édith Piaf.

== Life around World War II ==
In 1939, Marcel Bleustein married Sophie Vaillant, an English teacher who was the granddaughter of Édouard Vaillant, a well-known 19th century Socialist politician. They had three daughters, including Élisabeth Badinter, a prominent feminist writer and philosopher who chairs the supervisory board of Publicis Groupe.

When the Second World War broke out, Marcel Bleustein's companies were confiscated by the German occupation forces as "Jewish properties". From July to October 1943, Bleustein was imprisoned by the fascist government of the Spanish dictator Francisco Franco but was later released thanks to British intervention.

He joined the Resistance, took the code-name "Blanchet", and was detached to serve as a co-pilot for the US Eighth Air Force, flying bombing missions over France and the Netherlands.

== Rebuilding Publicis ==
When the war ended, he rebuilt Publicis from scratch, introducing the first opinion polls in France and developing the then-American fields of consumer research and brand analysis. He retained his Resistance name of Blanchet, adding it legally to his original name.

After the war, Bleustein-Blanchet reopened Publicis and, calling them on the phone himself, rapidly regained old and new clients, notably Shell, Colgate-Palmolive, L'Oreal, Renault, Dim and many others.

In 1957 he opened the first "Publicis Drugstore" on the ground level of Publicis' headquarters, 133 avenue des Champs Elysées, former location of the Astoria hotel. The "Drugstore" was considered a huge success and became the rendez vous point of the "cool" parisian youth.

During the 1970s, under the leadership of Bleustein-Blanchet and his successor, Maurice Lévy, Publicis became an international communications group and is now the third largest communications group in the world.

In 2008, twelve years after his death, the American Advertising Federation announced that Marcel Bleustein-Blanchet would become the first non-American to be named to the Advertising Hall of Fame.

== Personal life ==
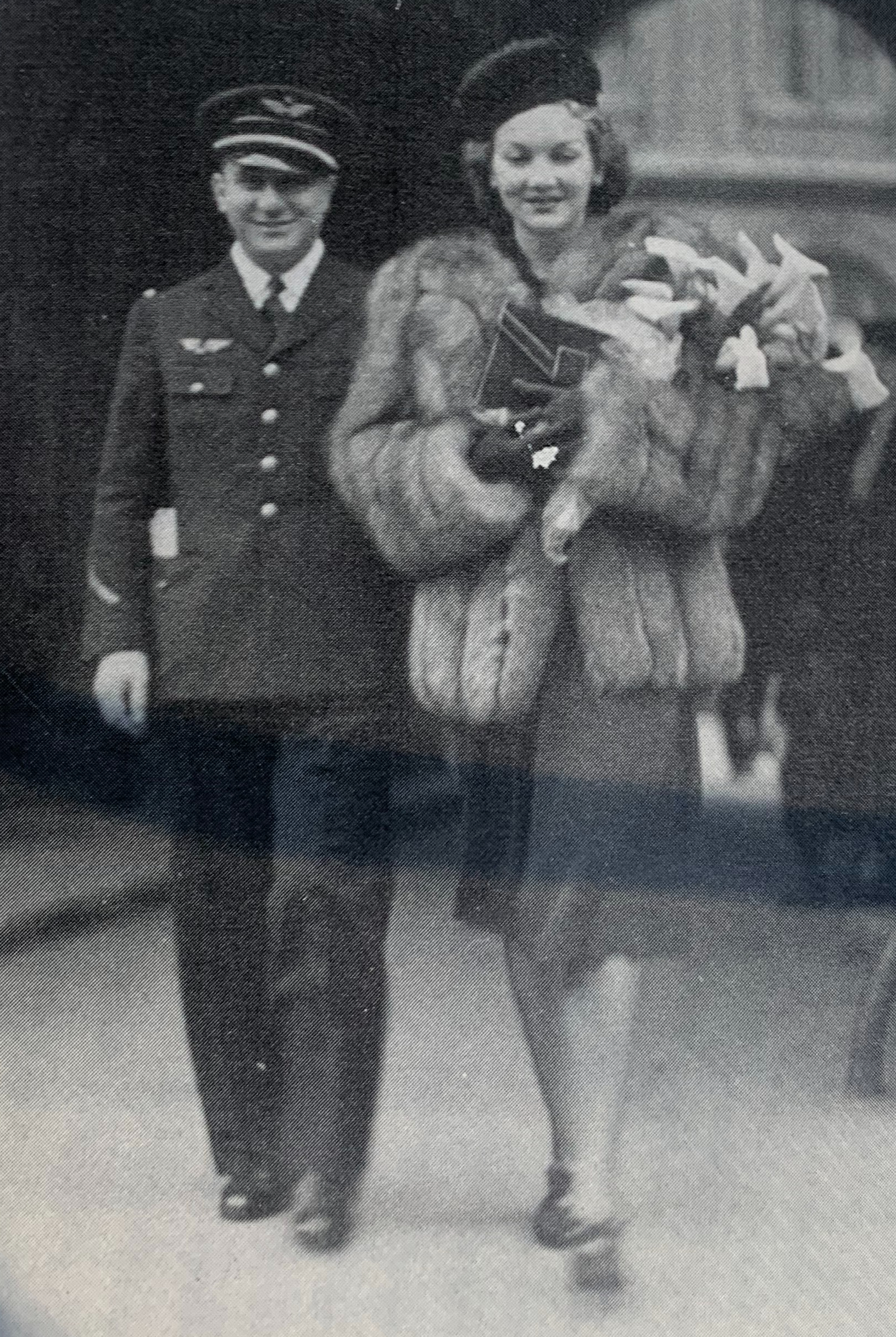
Marcel and Sophie Bleustein-Blanchet (c. 1940)

The Bleustein-Blanchets had three daughters. Marie-Francoise (born in 1940) died in a car accident in 1968, and Elisabeth (born in 1944) became the heir apparent to the Publicis fortune in 1996 and one of modern France's greatest intellectuals.

The family practiced Judaism and Catholicism simultaneously. Marie-Francoise's untimely death in 1968 put an immense strain on the couple's marriage, but they nonetheless remained devoted to one another until Marcel's death on April 11, 1996.

In addition to his Jewish and Catholic faith, Bleustein-Blanchet also had an active interest in Eastern religions and believed in reincarnation.

== Other interests ==
He was a founding member of L’Académie nationale des arts de la rue (ANAR) created in 1975 with Jacques Dauphin, Maurice Cazeneuve, Paul Delouvrier, Georges Elgozy, Roger Excoffon, Abraham Moles, and André Parinaud.

== See also ==
- Fondation Marcel Bleustein-Blanchet
