= L'Autre (2020 film) =

- Official poster
- Directed by: Charlotte Dauphin
- Written by: Charlotte Dauphin
- Produced by: Jean-Luc Ormières; Charlotte Dauphin; Sylvie Landra
- Starring: Àstrid Bergès-Frisbey; Anouk Grinberg; James Thierrée; Jean-Louis Martinelli; Charlotte Dauphin
- Cinematography: Jean-Marc Fabre
- Edited by: Sylvie Landra
- Music by: Charlotte Reinhardt; James Thierrée; Charlotte Dauphin
- Production company: Marignan Films
- Distributed by: Dean Medias
- Release date: January 8, 2020
- Running time: 77 minutes
- Country: France
- Language: French

L'Autre (English: The Other) is a 2020 French drama film written and directed by Charlotte Dauphin. It stars Àstrid Bergès-Frisbey, Anouk Grinberg, James Thierrée, Jean-Louis Martinelli, and Charlotte Dauphin. It had its premiere in France on January 8, 2020.

== Cast ==
- Àstrid Bergès-Frisbey as Marie
- Anouk Grinberg as Marie
- James Thierrée as Paul
- Jean-Louis Martinelli as the father
- Charlotte Dauphin as the mother

== Release ==
The film premiered in North American premiere at the San Diego International Film Festival in October 2020.

== Awards and nominations ==
Year	Award	Category	Nominee(s)	Result	Ref.
2020	Taormina Film Fest	Best Actress	Àstrid Bergès-Frisbey	Won	
