= Gil Oved =

South African entrepreneur (born 1975)

- Born: 16 August 1975 (age 51); Johannesburg, South Africa
- Education: University of South Africa; CFA Institute
- Occupations: Businessman, tv host
- Known for: Advertising
- Title: Co-Founder and Co-CEO of The Creative Counsel (2001–present)
- Term: 2001–present
- Website: Company website

Gil Oved (born 16 August 1975) is a South African entrepreneur who is the co-founder and co-CEO of The Creative Counsel, South Africa's largest advertising agency. He is a member of the global Young Presidents' Organization where he is the Johannesburg chapter chair as well as the Africa regional forum officer. He is one of the Dragons on the hugely popular television reality show Dragons' Den South Africa which premiered in the last quarter of 2014 on DSTV. In 2016 Oved was chosen as the first "Shark" on the new series of Shark Tank on M-NET.

== Early life ==
Oved was born on 16 August 1975 in Johannesburg, South Africa. He matriculated at Crawford College, Sandton, earned a Bachelor of Commerce degree (Cum Laude) at the University of South Africa, and subsequently obtained the Chartered Financial Analyst (CFA) qualification.

As a teenager at the time of South Africa's first democratic elections in 1994, Oved's imagination was fired by the country's new potential for transformation. He became an anchor presenter for the country's first multi-racial television teen magazine programme called Zap Mag. He was the anchor presenter from 1990 to 1995, along with a Vusi Twala. Twala and Oved became close friends and, after they matriculated, started a television production company in 1996 known as Jewazi (a combination of the words Jew and Swazi).

The production company saw some successes over its approximate three years of existence and had programmes commissioned by the SABC (South African Broadcasting Corporation) most noteworthy SuperKidz, but never got the traction needed to create a sustainable business. Oved set his sights on the next goal. He teamed up with a friend from school, Ran Neu-Ner, to start an Internet trading company just as the dot.com bubble was expanding.

The pair raised almost a million dollars and invested three years in developing their business called Wealthmaker but, when the dot.com bubble burst in the early 2000s, their investors went bankrupt, and they followed suit. Observing that Neu-Ner's girlfriend of the time, a student who was earning extra money as a promotional field worker, was earning considerably more than they were, Oved and Neu-Ner decided to set up a small low risk, low barrier-to-entry business placing promotional staff.

Although initially a ‘stop-gap’ initiative, both men found that they enjoyed the process of helping clients think through campaigns and began to take very seriously the creative process and execution of brand building through promotions and activations.

The company grew exponentially, through the acquisition of new clients as well as other businesses in the advertising and marketing sector attracting the attention of Publicis Groupe who bought the Company in September 2015. TCC operates under Publicis Africa Group. Oved remains group co-CEO together with Neu-Ner. The Creative Counsel has retained its name.

Oved lives in the Johannesburg region.

== Television ==
In 2014 Oved became one of the dragons in the first season of South Africa's Dragons' Den along with Vinny Lingham, Lebo Gunguluza, Vusi Thembekwayo and Polo Leteka Radebe. In 2015 was chosen as the first 'Shark' in the South African version of the Shark Tank series by MNET. The Shark Tank series is sponsored in full by Telkom South Africa.

== Awards ==
Oved's industry accolades include:

- 2015 Finalist Ernst and Young Entrepreneur of the Year: Southern Africa
- 2015 Sanlam / Business Partners Entrepreneur of the Year® – Overall winner
- 2014 CNBC All Africa Business Leader Awards (AABLA) Young Business Leader – Overall Africa
- 2014 CNBC All Africa Business Leader Awards (AABLA) Young Business Leader – Southern Africa
- 2014 AdReview ranks TCC largest marketing, media and advertising group in South Africa
- 2014 Gil Oved named GQ Best Dressed Man 2014
- 2013 Absa Unlisted Company Award for business excellence and entrepreneurship
- 2013 Destiny magazines Top 40 under 40 Men in South Africa.
