= Laura Lang =

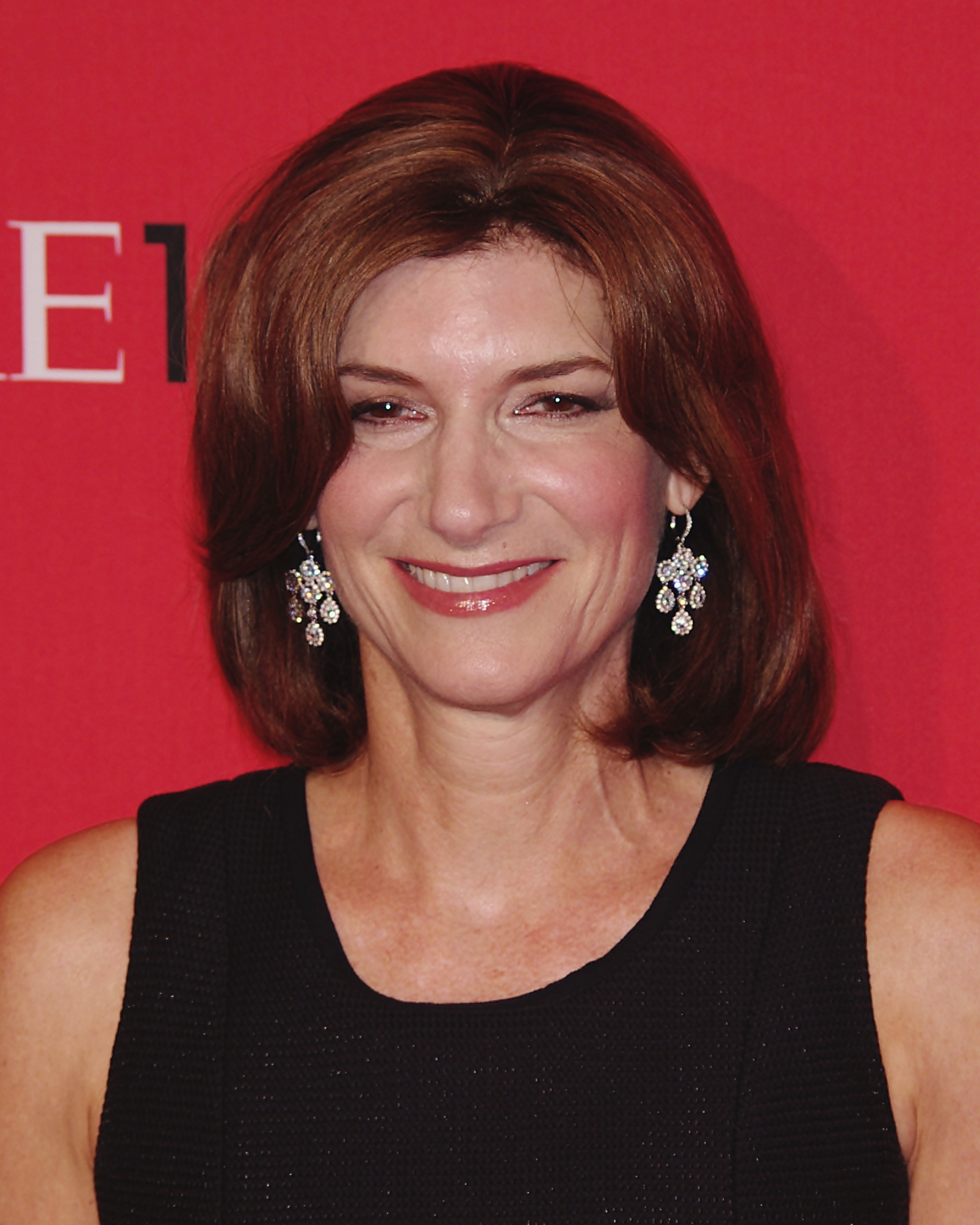
- Born: United States
- Education: Tufts University Wharton School of the University of Pennsylvania
- Occupation: CEO of Time Inc.

Laura Lang is the former CEO of Time Inc. She was the CEO of Digitas, a global integrated brand agency from 2008 to 2012.

== Career ==
Lang was raised in Warwick, Rhode Island. She graduated from Tufts University and received an MBA in finance from the Wharton School of the University of Pennsylvania. She began her career on the client side, in product and brand management at the Quaker Oats Co., Bristol-Myers and Pfizer Pharmaceutical Co. She then spent time as senior vice president/group manager at Yankelovich Clancy Shulman. After that, she served as president at Marketing Corp. of America, where she did strategic consulting for clients in the retail, electronics and information, entertainment, travel, and gaming industries.

In 1999, she joined Digitas and ran the company's New York office for several years. She became CEO of Digitas North America in 2004 and then global CEO in 2008. Under Lang's leadership, Digitas doubled its new-business revenue in 2008 and expanded relationships with some of its key clients.

In 2007, Advertising Age named Lang one of its "Women to Watch". Lang also made BtoB Magazine's "Who's Who" list in 2006, 2007, and 2009. She currently sits on the advisory board of the Tufts University Entrepreneurial Leadership Program, the Board of Directors for Benchmark Electronics, and the Board of Directors for Nutrisystem. She also co-chairs “The One Hundred,” a committee dedicated to raising awareness and funds for the Massachusetts General Hospital Cancer Center.

== Recognition ==
In 2012, Forbes named Lang one of the top 20 most influential businesswomen in the world.
