= Àstrid Bergès-Frisbey =

Spanish and French actress

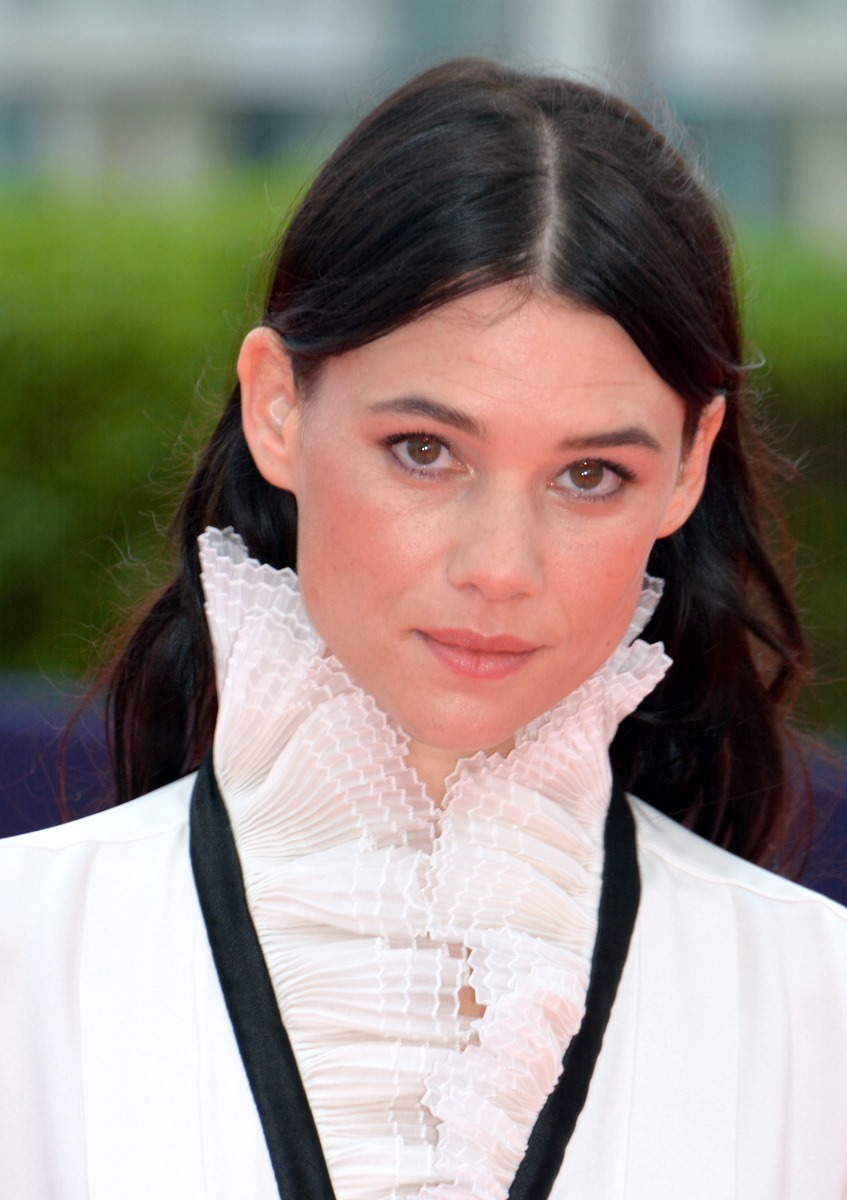
- Bergès-Frisbey in 2020
- Born: 26 May 1986 (age 40); Barcelona, Spain
- Citizenship: Spain; France
- Occupations: Actress; model
- Years active: 2007–present
- Height: 1.71 m (5 ft 7 1/2 in)

Àstrid Bergès-Frisbey (born 26 May 1986) is a French-Spanish actress. She is best known for playing Suzanne in The Sea Wall, the mermaid Syrena in Pirates of the Caribbean: On Stranger Tides and Sofi in I Origins. She also played the Mage in King Arthur: Legend of the Sword. She received the Prix Suzanne Bianchetti in 2009 and the Trophée Chopard Award for Female Revelation of the Year at the 2011 Cannes Film Festival and a nomination at the 2016 David di Donatello in Rome.

== Early life ==
Àstrid Bergès-Frisbey was born in Barcelona to a Spanish father and a French-American mother. She is the eldest among three daughters. Following her parents' divorce when she was 2 years old, she moved to southwestern France when she was 5. She was raised in a small town near La Rochelle, where she acted in school plays as a hobby, but never saw acting as a possible career path as the countryside where she lived was very different from the movie industry, describing how she thought acting was "not a profession; it was something abstract". Her father later moved to the Dominican Republic, where she spent five summers working as a waitress. At age 17, she moved to Paris by herself to pursue a career in osteopathy, but found herself moving around a lot, without knowing anybody in the area. Shortly after, her father died at age 46. Due to the incident, she describes realizing that life is too short and that her true ambition was acting. After graduation, she went straight to drama school. She is fluent in Catalan, Spanish, French and Italian. She started learning English for her role in Pirates of the Caribbean.

== Career ==
She made her acting debut in 2007 on French television. In 2008, she made her feature début in the film The Sea Wall. She began modeling in 2010, fronting French Connection's spring/summer and autumn/winter campaigns.

Bergès-Frisbey made her English-language debut in 2011 Pirates of the Caribbean: On Stranger Tides, earning the role of the mermaid Syrena, after a whirlwind of auditions in France, Hollywood, and the UK. She had to learn to speak English for the role. During filming in Hawaii, she was restricted from going out in daylight to keep her skin pale.

In 2012, Bergès-Frisbey starred in the Spanish film El sexo de los ángeles. The following year she played the title-role in the coming-of-age French film Juliette (2013). After that, she appeared in her second English-speaking feature film as Sofi in IOrigins (2014).

She learned to speak Italian for the movie Alaska (2015), which earned her a nomination for the David di Donatello for Best Actress. In 2017, she had a supporting role in King Arthur: Legend of the Sword. In 2020, she received the award for Best Actress at the Taormina Film Fest for her performance in L'Autre.

Bergès-Frisbey currently serves as a brand-ambassador for Chanel.

== Filmography ==
Film roles
Year	Title	Role	Notes
2008	The Sea Wall	Suzanne	also known as Un barrage contre le Pacifique
2009	La première étoile	Juliette	
2009	Extase	Jeanne	
2010	Bruc. El desafío	Gloria	
2011	La fille du puisatier	Patricia Amoretti	also known as The Well Digger's Daughter
2011	Pirates of the Caribbean: On Stranger Tides	Syrena	
2012	El sexo de los ángeles	Carla	English-language title: Sex of Angels
2013	Juliette	Juliette Karsenty	
2014	I Origins	Sofi	
2015	Alaska	Nadine	Nominated —David di Donatello for Best Actress
2017	King Arthur: Legend of the Sword	The Mage	
2020	L'Autre	Marie	Won – Best Actress at Taormina Film Fest
2021	The Vault	Lorraine	
2024	Cuckoo	Ed	
2026	Mi Amor	Lina	

Television roles
Year	Title	Role	Notes
2007	Sur le fil	Marie Sertissian	3 episodes
2007	Divine Émilie	Marquise de Boufflers	TV movie
2008	Elles et moi	Young Isabel	Miniseries
2009	La reine morte	The infanta	TV movie
2021	Capitain Marleau	Eva Sallaberry	1 episode

== Stage ==
- Equus (2008), as Jill Mason
