= Mirwais =

Mirwais is a first name of Pashto origin. Notable people with the name include:

- Mirwais Ahmadzaï (born 1960), known as Mirwais, Paris-based record producer and songwriter
- Mirwais Azizi, founder and owner of Azizi Bank
- Mirwais Ashraf (born 1980), member of the Afghanistan national cricket team
- Mirwais Hotak (1673–1715), Emir of Afghanistan
- Mirwais Jalil (1969–1994), journalist
- Mirwais Naziri, member of the Afghanistan national cricket team
- Mirwais Sadiq (1973–2004), Civil Aviation minister of Afghanistan
- Mirwais Yasini (born 1962), member of the Lower House of the Afghan Parliament
