= André Tubeuf =

French writer (1930–2021)

- Born: December 18, 1930 (age 95); İzmir
- Died: July 26, 2021 (aged 90); 17th arrondissement of Paris
- Awards: Prix de l'essai (2009), Prix de la Critique (2018), Ordre national du Mérite (Commander, 2009)

Education
- Education: Lycée Louis le Grand

Philosophical work
- Era: Contemporary philosophy
- Region: Western philosophy
- Institutions: Lycée Fustel-de-Coulanges, Strasbourg
- Main interests: Musicology, Music criticism

André Tubeuf (18 December 1930 – 26 July 2021) was a French writer, philosopher, and music critic.

== Biography ==
=== Training ===
Tubeuf was born in Smyrna (today İzmir), Turkey. A condisciple in Beirut, Lebanon, France, of Salah Stétié and Robert Abirached, Tubeuf came to Paris, France, after the war and performed his khâgne at the lycee Louis-le-Grand, where he joined Dominique Fernandez, Michel Deguy, Jacques Derrida and his cousin Pierre-Jean Rémy.

In 1950, Tubeuf was received at the École normale supérieure, rue d'Ulm, where he first followed the teaching of Michel Alexandre (himself a pupil of Alain), then that of Louis Althusser and Maurice Merleau-Ponty, and became friends with Gérard Granel.

In 1951, with Maurice Clavel, Tubeuf translated Electra by Sophocles for Silvia Monfort.

An agrégé in philosophy, Tubeuf taught this subject in philosophy class and then in Classes préparatoires littéraires (khâgne) at the lycée Fustel-de-Coulanges in Strasbourg, from 1957 to 1992.

In 1972, he joined the Ministry of Culture in the cabinet of Jacques Duhamel, to deal with musical matters; he pursued this experience in 1975 in the office of Michel Guy.

=== Writer ===
From 1976, Tubeuf mainly collaborated with the magazine Le Point, but also at Avant Scène Opéra, Harmonie and Lyrica, then Diapason and finally Classica. In addition, he was a regular lecturer, such as at the Salzburg Festival, and radio broadcaster.

After Romain Rolland, André Suarès and Vladimir Jankélévitch, of whom he was the pupil, he renewed the genre of musical literature in France, escaping the novelistic genre, without falling into musicology.

In addition to his essays on Mozart, Ludwig van Beethoven, Richard Wagner, Giuseppe Verdi, Richard Strauss and the lied, Tubeuf wrote profiles of Elisabeth Schwarzkopf, Dietrich Fischer-Dieskau, Claudio Arrau, Hans Hotter, Rudolf Serkin, Arthur Rubinstein, Régine Crespin, Daniel Barenboim, Hélène Grimaud and Cecilia Bartoli.

=== Awards and distinctions ===
- Commandeur of the National Order of Merit (2009)
- The Académie française awarded him 2009 the Prix de l'essai (2009)
- The Académie française awarded him the Prix de la critique (Académie française) in 2018 for his entire body of work.

== Bibliography ==
- 1979: Le Chant retrouvé, Fayard
- 1993: Le Lied allemand; poètes et paysages (in French). François Bourin. 1993. p. 537. ISBN 2-87686-141-0. OCLC 299444867.
- 1987: Les Enfants dissipés, novel, Gallimard
- 1993: Wagner, le chant des images, "L'opéra des images", Éditions du Chêne
- 1999: La Callas, "Mémoire des Stars", Pierre Assouline publisher
- 2000: Damiel ou les Indifférents, novel, Albin Michel
- 2003: Appassionata (portrait of pianist Claudio Arrau)
- 2004: Richard Strauss ou le Voyageur et son ombre, biography, "Classica", Actes Sud
- 2004: Les Autres Soirs, with Elisabeth Schwarzkopf, Éditions Tallandier
- 2005: Mozart, chemins et chant, biography, "Classica", Actes Sud
- 2005: Divas, book with CD, Assouline
- 2007: L'Offrande musicale, portraits an essays, "Bouquins", Éditions Robert Laffont
- 2008: La Quatorzième Valse, novel, "Classica", Actes Sud
- 2008: Les Amours du poète, La Pionnière
- 2009: Beethoven, biography, "Classica", Actes Sud, prix de l'essai of the Académie française.
- 2010: Verdi, de vive voix, biography, "Classica", Actes Sud
- 2010: Hommage à Régine Crespin, with Christophe Ghristi, Actes Sud/Opéra de Paris
- 2010: L'Opéra de Vienne, Actes Sud
- 2011: Les Ballets russes, Assouline
- 2011: Le Lied, Actes Sud
- 2012: Dictionnaire amoureux de la musique, Plon
- 2013: Je crois entendre encore…, Plon
- 2014: Hommages, Actes Sud
- 2016: L'Orient derrière soi, Actes Sud
