= Qorvis =

American communications company

Coordinates: 38°54′21.64″N 77°2′27.29″W

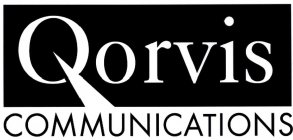
- Type: Private
- Industry: management consulting, lobbying
- Founded: 2000
- Founder: Michael Petruzzello Doug Poretz
- Headquarters: Washington, D.C., United States
- Key people: Matt J. Lauer (CEO)
- Services: Media relations, crisis communications, financial structuring
- Number of employees: 80
- Website: qorvis.com

Qorvis is an international Washington, D.C.–based management consulting, public affairs, regulatory and strategic communications firm. It was acquired by the Publicis Groupe in January 2014, and became Qorvis/MSLGroup. On December 31, 2022, Qorvis was sold by Publicis to a group led by long-time Qorvis executive Matt J. Lauer.

Qorvis provides public relations (PR) representation on behalf of a range of public companies, financial services firms, sovereign nations, and wealthy individuals. During the 2008 financial crisis, Qorvis represented Wells Fargo and AIG.

== History ==
Qorvis was founded in August 2000 through the merger of The Poretz Group (investor relations firm serving technology companies), The Weber/Merritt Company (a public affairs and grassroots specialist) and JAS Communications (a public relations and marketing communications agency). Michael Petruzzello, former CEO of Weber Shandwick, founded the new PR firm and the managing director.

Offering traditional public and investor relations services, Qorvis launched with 22 employees and revenues of approximately $14 million in revenues. In addition, the law firm Patton Boggs established a strategic alliance with the Qorvis and became its lead investor. The CEO described the firm to PR Week as "in the gray area where technology, finance, public affairs and marketing converge".

During the first six years, the firm added market and consumer research, media training and grassroots lobbying to its services, working for clients such as United Technologies, the Jim Beam liquor family and the Consumer Electronics Association. By 2006, the firm had 90 employees in two offices, billing approximately $23 million.

In 2007, Qorvis extended its services of web design and advertising through the acquisition of boutique advertising agency Sparky's garage.

== Relations with governments ==
In 2015 Government of Libya dropped its $1M one-year pact with Qorvis after an evaluation of performance of MSLGroup entity.

== Notable work ==
In addition to foreign governments, Qorvis' clients have included numerous corporations, non-governmental organizations and high-net-worth individuals.

- Ahmed Ezz
- Bahrain
- Cambodia
- China
- Cyprus
- Equatorial Guinea and Teodoro Obiang Nguema Mbasogo
- Fiji
- Food and Drug Administration
- Gunvor
- Ghana
- Halliburton
- Huawei
- Massey Energy
- Phillip Morris International
- Saudi Arabia
- The Sugar Association
- Trafigura
- Novatek
- Sri Lanka
- United States Department of State
- Vitol
- Yemen

=== Saudi Arabia ===
Saudi Arabia first hired Qorvis to improve its image in the wake of the September 11 attacks, retaining the firm on a $14 million-a-year contract. Qorvis engaged in a PR frenzy that publicized the "9/11 Commission finding that there was 'no evidence that the Saudi government as an institution or senior Saudi officials individually funded Al Qaeda, while omitting the report's conclusion that 'Saudi Arabia has been a problematic ally in combating Islamic extremism.'" Petruzzello told The Washington Post that the work was not about "lobbying" but "educating" the public and policy makers.

In 2004, Matt J. Lauer, previously executive director of the U.S. Advisory Commission on Public Diplomacy at the State Department, was hired by Qorvis to work on public relations for Saudi Arabia and other clients. Lauer subsequently founded the group's Geopolitical Solutions (GPS) division, which went on to represent numerous foreign sovereign countries and corporations, including Yemen, China and Equatorial Guinea.

In December 2004, the Federal Bureau of Investigation executed search warrants at Qorvis's offices as part of a criminal investigation into whether a pro-Saudi radio-ad campaign run by the firm broke federal law by not disclosing funds from the Saudi government. No charges were ever filed.

The company was handed the lucrative lead role in shaping media coverage of the widely criticized Saudi-led attack on Yemen of 2015. This included the creation of the website operationrenewalofhope.com and helping Saudi officials gain access to US media. One example of the latter is a Newsweek article in which the Saudi foreign minister claims that, far from "supporting violent extremism", his country has actually shown "leadership in combating terrorism".

Qorvis has also been employed by Saudi Arabia to perform reputation laundering following the Kingdom's assassination of journalist Jamal Khashoggi, receiving $18.8 million from October 2018 through July 2019 and signing three additional contracts with the Kingdom in spring 2019.

In 2020, Qorvis was hired by the Saudi Arabian Human Rights Commission, for an annual fee of $684,000.

=== Bahrain ===
Qorvis was criticized by human rights groups for representing governments such as Bahrain. Qorvis is the agency of record for the Kingdom of Bahrain. According to Foreign Agents Registration filings with the Department of Justice, Bahrain's government pays Qorvis $40,000 per month to manage the government's communications strategy and image in the United States in face of civil protests. In August 2011, it was widely reported that Qorvis wrote press releases on behalf of Bahrain's government, defending its crackdown on Doctors Without Borders. Qorvis employee Tom Squitieri has written articles critical of the protesters that have appeared in The Huffington Post and USA Today. Qorvis assists in organizing delegations of individuals who represent the government's point of view. These delegations often criticize opposition to Bahrain's monarchy.

In early February 2011, three of Qorvis's partners left the firm disgruntled by compensation; however, they later attributed it to the company's controversial work with foreign governments. A former employee was reported as saying, "I just have trouble working with despotic dictators killing their own people." During the Arab Spring uprisings in 2011, executive vice president Seth Thomas Pietras said, “Our clients are facing some challenges now.... But our long-term goals—to bridge the differences between our clients and the United States—haven’t changed. We stand by them.”

== Controversies ==
Given that Qorvis has represented the country of Saudi Arabia since the September 11 attacks, the company has been accused of helping to whitewash that country's record on human rights.

The writer Ken Klippenstein obtained leaked documents from Qorvis, which show the company pitching the private company Caliburn on a propaganda video, which intended to improve the reputation of its Homestead, Florida shelter for "unaccompanied alien children."
