= Starcom (media agency) =

Advertising and marketing company based in Chicago, USA

- Industry: Advertising, marketing
- Founded: 2000
- Headquarters: 35 West Wacker Drive, Chicago, Illinois
- Number of locations: 110
- Areas served: Global
- Key people: Michael Epstein, US & Global CEO
- Number of employees: 8,000
- Parent: Publicis
- Website: www.starcomww.com

Starcom is an international media network, the third-largest communications group globally, part of France’s Publicis, with headquarters in Chicago.

== History ==
The global holding company Starcom Mediavest Group was formed in 2000. Jack Klues, who had been the Chief Executive Officer of Starcom Worldwide, was named SMG’s first CEO upon its formation. Former CEO Laura Desmond became one of the business world’s youngest CEOs ever when she was named to the position in 2008.

In recent years, SMG has had partnerships with companies such as Facebook, Twitter, YouTube, Acxiom, Tencent and more involving data, analytics and "technology-fueled creativity".

SMG also reorganized into 3 divisions—Connections (media brands), Content (creative assets), and Tech solutions (RUN, extech)—to reflect the fact that it now derives more than 50% of its business from digital, content, and data/analytics.

== Resources ==
SMG Performance Marketing: Full-service media agency.

LiquidThread: branded entertainment content and on-ground activation specialists.

MRY: Full-service digital creative agency.

Relevant24: Real-time content agency creating multi-media branded content marketing

RUN: Mobile-first data management and programmatic buying platform for the digital world that executes cross-device campaigns across multiple formats, including display and video .

Data & Analytics:

Extech: Offers new marketplace products and services.

SPORTS at SMG: Sports and event marketing, including strategy, planning, rights acquisition and activation to SMG clients.

VivaKi: Programmatic advertising and media buying

IP Pixel: digital creative agency. IP Pixel was founded in 2003 by Nicholas Yecke, John Rafferty, and Jen Schreiber then members of Starcom IP - Starcom WorldWide, held by the Publicis Groupe. In 2007, Publicis restructured Pixel into a fully integrated part of its Starcom MediaVest Group.

== Employees and locations ==
SMG employs roughly 7,000 people in 49 locations worldwide.
