= Élisabeth Badinter =

French author, historian

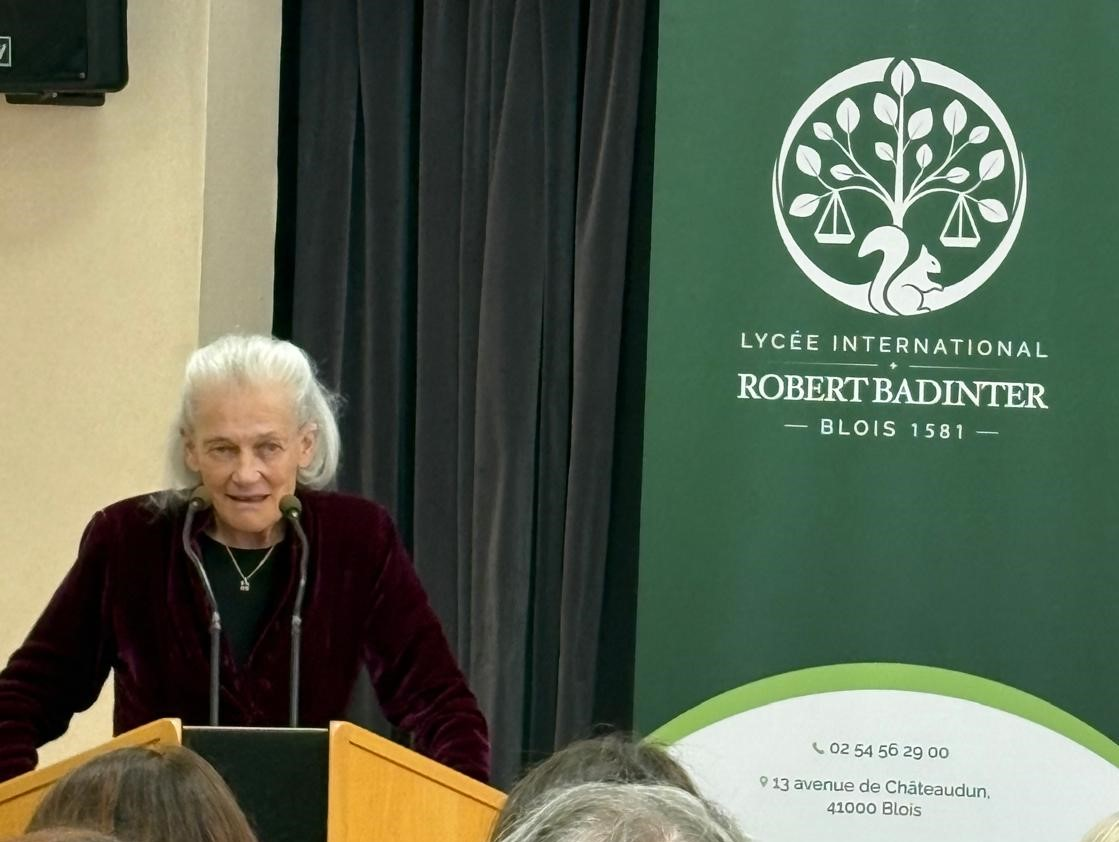
- Badinter in 2025
- Born: Élisabeth Bleustein-Blanchet; 5 March 1944 (age 82); Boulogne-Billancourt, France
- Education: École alsacienne
- Alma mater: Sorbonne
- Occupations: Author, philosopher, historian, professor
- Known for: Literary works in humanities and women's history
- Board member of: Publicis
- Spouse: Robert Badinter (m. 1966; died 2024)
- Children: 3
- Parent(s): Sophie Vaillant and Marcel Bleustein-Blanchet

Élisabeth Badinter (née Bleustein-Blanchet; born 5 March 1944) is a French philosopher, author and historian.

She is best known for her philosophical treatises on feminism and women's role in society. She is an advocate of liberal feminism and women migrant workers' rights in France. Badinter is described as having a commitment to Enlightenment rationalism and universalism. She advocates for a "moderate feminism". A 2010 Marianne news magazine poll named her France's "most influential intellectual", primarily on the basis of her books on women's rights and motherhood.

Badinter is the largest shareholder of Publicis Groupe, a multinational advertising and public relations company, and the chairwoman of its supervisory board. She received these shares in an inheritance from her father, Marcel Bleustein-Blanchet, who founded the company. According to Forbes, she is one of the wealthiest French citizens with a net worth of US$1.8 billion in 2012.

== Early life ==
Badinter was born in Boulogne-Billancourt to Sophie Vaillant and Marcel Bleustein-Blanchet, founder of Publicis. Sophie Vaillant was the granddaughter of Édouard Vaillant, a French leftwing political leader and social activist. Elizabeth's mother was raised as a Roman Catholic in a middle class upbringing, and later converted to Judaism following her marriage. She raised Élisabeth in the Jewish faith.

Elisabeth and her two sisters were raised by parents who believed in the equality of the sexes. She received her secondary education from L'école alsacienne, a private school in Paris. During adolescence, Badinter read Simone de Beauvoir's the Second Sex, which profoundly influenced her views, inspiring her pursuit of a doctorate in philosophy at Sorbonne University. She is a specialist in French history of the Age of Enlightenment.

== Career ==
After her studies, Badinter taught at the École polytechnique. Her first book titled, L'Amour en plus, was published in 1980 and raises the question of whether maternal love is an exclusively natural instinct or a tendency reinforced in the cultural context, in which the behaviour of motherly affection is expected.

In her critical work, L'un est l'autre, published in 1987, Badinter reflects upon the complementarities of masculine and feminine traits in gendered identities and the conflicts that arise when these complementarities are subjected to oppression. Badinter concludes that a new era of gendered resemblances will lead to a change in gender identities and a revolution of moral values.

Her 2003 treatise, La fausse route, addresses misandry and victimisation of women by French contemporary feminists. "The systematic denial of women's power and violence, the constant portrayal of women as oppressed and therefore innocent is deepening the crevasses of a divided humanity: the victims of masculine oppression on one side and the almighty executioners on the other. " She criticizes essentialists within the feminist movement, arguing that, "Man is not the enemy."

== Political activism ==
During the 1989 Islamic scarf controversy in France, Badinter, Régis Debray, Alain Finkielkraut, Élisabeth de Fontenay, and Catherine Kintzler wrote an open letter to the then Minister of Education, Lionel Jospin, demanding that students who refuse to take off their headscarves not be allowed to attend state schools. Badinter believes that the French public education system should be free of any religious affiliation and that neutrality in public institutions of a secularist state must prevail over expressions of individuality in them. In an interview with the Financial Times, she says, "The religions of the Book have always fought against what would liberate women or facilitate their lives ... We talk about Muslim radicals all the time but it’s more general."

== Personal life ==
In 1966, she married lawyer Robert Badinter, who would become Minister of Justice under François Mitterrand. Élisabeth and Robert Badinter have one daughter and two sons.

== Honours and awards ==
- Belgium : honorary doctorate from the Free University of Brussels (2013)
- Monaco : Commander of the Order of Cultural Merit (2011)
- France : Commander of the Order of Arts and Letters (2007)
- Belgium : honorary doctorate from the University of Liège (2004)

== Publications ==
- L'Amour en plus: histoire de l'amour maternel (XVIIe-XXe siècle), 1981; ISBN 2-253-02944-0
- Les Goncourt: « Romanciers et historiens des femmes », foreword of « La Femme au XVIIe siècle d'Edmond et Jules de Goncourt, 1981
- Émilie, Émilie, L'ambition féminine au XVIIIe siècle, 1983; ISBN 2-08-210089-8
- Les Remontrances de Malesherbes (1771–1775), 1985
- L'Un est l'autre, 1986; ISBN 2-7381-1364-8
- Cahiers Suzanne Lilar, pp. 15–26, Paris, Gallimard, 1986; ISBN 2-07-070632-X
- Condorcet. Un intellectuel en politique, 1988
- Correspondance inédite de Condorcet et Madame Suard (1771–1791), 1988
- Madame d'Épinay, Histoire de Madame de Montbrillant ou les Contreconfessions, foreword by d'Élisabeth Badinter, 1989
- Thomas, Diderot, Madame d'Épinay: Qu'est-ce qu'une femme?, foreword by Élisabeth Badinter, 1989
- Condorcet, Prudhomme, Guyomar: Paroles d'hommes (1790–1793), Élisabeth Badinter, 1989
- XY, De l'identité masculine, 1992; ISBN 2-253-09783-7
- Madame du Châtelet, Discours sur le bonheur, foreword, 1997
- Les Passions intellectuelles, tome 1: Désirs de gloire (1735–1751), 1999
- Les Passions intellectuelles, tome 2: L'exigence de dignité (1751–1762), 2002
- Badinter, Elisabeth (2007). Les Passions intellectuelles, tome 3: Volonté Pouvoir (1762–1778). Fayard. ISBN 978-2-213-62643-7.
- Simone de Beauvoir, Marguerite Yourcenar, Nathalie Sarraute, 2002. Conference Élizabeth Badinter, Jacques Lassalle and Lucette Finas; ISBN 2-7177-2220-3
- Fausse route, 2003; ISBN 2-253-11264-X
- Julia Borossa Badinter, Elisabeth (2006). Dead End Feminism. Polity. ISBN 0-7456-3380-3.; translated from Fausse route
- Madame du Châtelet, Madame d'Épinay: Ou l'Ambition féminine au XVIIIe siècle, 2006; ISBN 2-08-210563-6.
- Badinter, Elisabeth (2010). Le conflit, la femme et la mère. Flammarion. ISBN 978-2-253-15755-7.
- Adriana Hunter, Badinter, Elisabeth (2012). The Conflict: How Modern Motherhood Undermines the Status of Women. Henry Holt and Company. ISBN 978-0-8050-9414-5.; translated from Le Conflit
- Le Pouvoir au féminin, Marie-Thérèse d'Autriche 1717–1780 – L'impératrice-reine, 9 November 2016; ISBN 978-2-08-137772-1
