= MSL (company) =

Public relations network of companies

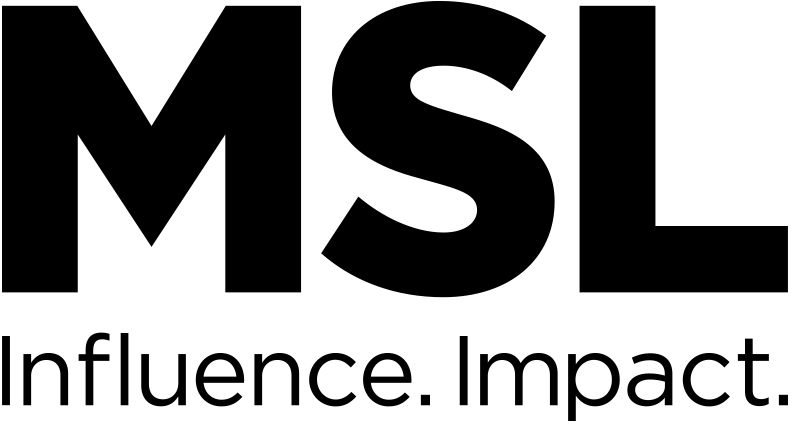
- Industry: Communications; Marketing; Public relations
- Founded: 2009
- Headquarters: Paris, France
- Area served: Worldwide
- Number of employees: 2,000
- Parent: Publicis Groupe
- Website: mslgroup.com

MSLGROUP is a public relations (PR) network of companies. Specialists in strategic communications and engagement, the company is part of the French multinational Publicis Groupe. It evolved as a merger of Publicis Consultants and Manning Selvage & Lee (thus, the "MSL" in the name).

In 2021, public relations analyst firm The Holmes Report ranked MSLGROUP as the seventh largest PR agency in the world, by revenue. MSLGROUP has over 100 offices in 40 countries, and employs 2,000 people (as of February 2022).

== History ==
In 1980, MS&L was acquired by the Benton & Bowles, Inc. ad agency, who ended up merging with the Leo Burnett ad agency before the entire group was bought by France's Publicis Groupe, to form the world's fourth largest communications company.

In October 2010, MSLGROUP acquired 20:20, an Indian public relations firm specializing in technology and social media. In November, it acquired Eastwei Relations, now integrated into MSL China. In December, Publicis Groupe announced a majority stake in Brazilian PR agency Andreoli MS&L to align under MSLGROUP.

In 2011, MSLGROUP made four acquisitions: Taiwan-based Interactive Communications Ltd (ICL), Genedigi Group, technology PR agency Schwartz Communications, and Ciszewski Public Relations, Poland's largest independent public relations agency. Schwartz Communications was renamed Schwartz MSL.

In 2012, MSLGROUP acquired two marketing firms: King Harvests and Luminous Experiential. In July, CNC Communications became part of MSLGROUP after Publicis Groupe acquired it.

In August 2013, Brazilian digital and social media marketing agency Espalhe joined MSLGROUP when Publicis Groupe acquired a majority stake in it.

In January 2014, Publicis Groupe acquired 100% stake in Washington D.C.–based Qorvis Communications to become a part of MSLGROUP. In June, Publicis Consultants MARC joined MSLGROUP, the agency operates under the name Publicis Consultants MSLGROUP, as part of Publicis Groupe Sofia – the Bulgarian unit of Publicis Groupe. In July, Publicis Groupe acquired UK based sustainability firm Salterbaxter, the agency operates as Salterbaxter MSLGROUP. That same year in September, Romanian PR agency, The Practice joined MSLGROUP. In October, LiveCOM Slovenia joined MSLGROUP to operate under the name LiveCOM MSLGROUP, as part of Publicis Groupe Slovenia. In November, Capital MSL and Communications Networking Consulting (CNC) merged, but retained the CNC name and began operations under MSLGROUP network On 1 January 2015 . Also in 2014, Schwartz MSL was completely absorbed into MSLGroup.

In February 2015, Publicis Groupe acquired South Africa based communications agency, Epic Communications which initially began to operate as Epic MSLGROUP.

In January 2016, MSLGROUP expanded its presence to Sri Lanka by re-branding Publicis Groupe's Sri Lankan PR agency Arc PR. In March, the company acquired Vietnam based Venus Communications to operate under the MSLGROUP brand. In March, Publicis Groupe announced an equity partnership with the communications arm of Nigeria-based The Troyka Group, including a total of 6 agencies: Insight Communications, The Thinkshop, All Seasons Media, Media Perspectives, The Quadrant Company, and Hotsauce. In June, Philippines based communications agency Arc started operating under the MSLGROUP brand through a strategic partnership with Publicis One. In November, MSLGROUP acquired Canadian PR firm North Strategic and its online video marketplace and content hub Notch Video In December, the agency established its presence in Thailand through the rebranding of Arc PR under the MSLGROUP brand. MSL entered the Australian market in July 2017 by acquiring New South Wales based The Herd Agency, rebranding it as Herd MSL. In November 2017, the agency opened a new office in Prague by integrating Publicis' PR operations in the Czech Republic under the MSL brand.

In 2019 MSL global CEO Guillaume Herbette left the company but was not replaced.

In December 2021, a team of Qorvis executives completed a management buyout, wholly acquiring the public affairs specialist shop from holding company Publicis Groupe and is no longer a part of Publicis Groupe or MSL.

== Recognition ==
- In 2016, MSLGROUP tied for fifth in the Holmes Report 250 Global Ranking of PR Firms, by revenue.
- In 2021, MSLGROUP was ranked 7th on the Global Top 250 PR Agency Ranking.
- MSL was named a 2022 and 2021 PRWeek Best Place to Work and PRovoke Media's 2022 Best Midsize Agency to Work For.

== Controversies ==
Qorvis MSLGroup, amid the execution of political protesters and opponents, has been working with Saudi Arabia for more than a decade to whitewash its record on human rights.
