= Digitas =

Marketing and technology agency

- Type: Subsidiary
- Industry: Marketing, Advertising, Technology
- Founded: 1980
- Founder: Michael Bronner
- Key people: Amy Lanzi (CEO), Luke Taylor (Global CEO), Laura Lang (Former CEO)
- Parent: Publicis
- Website: digitas.com

Digitas Inc. is a global advertising and technology agency. Founded in 1980, the company specializes in digital media, as well as web design and CRM marketing services. Digitas is a subsidiary of the French multinational advertising and public relations company Publicis Groupe.

== History ==
Digitas was originally founded as Eastern Exclusive by Michael Bronner in 1980. It later became Bronner Slosberg Humphrey Inc. (BSH). In 1995, the company launched a subsidiary called Strategic Interactive Group, which merged with BSH to form Bronner.com in 1999. Shortly thereafter, the company was renamed Digitas.

In December 2006, Digitas was acquired by Publicis Groupe for approximately $1.3 billion in an all-cash transaction. In 2013, Digitas merged with the European digital agency LBi to form DigitasLBi, creating one of the largest digital networks in the world.

In 2018, DigitasLBi underwent a global rebrand, dropping "LBi" from its name.

In 2018, Publicis Groupe launched a Digitas office in Thailand, following earlier expansions in Kuala Lumpur and Shanghai. The agency was also introduced to the Middle East.

== Leadership ==
From 2008 to 2012, Laura Lang served as the global CEO of Digitas. As of 2025, Amy Lanzi serves as CEO.
