= Georges Elgozy =

French economist

- Born: 15 April 1909; Oran, French Algeria
- Died: 13 July 1989 (aged 80); Paris
- Occupation: Economist

Georges Elgozy (14 April 1909 – 13 July 1989) was Inspector General of the National Economy and President of the European Committee for Economic and Cultural Cooperation. Throughout his career he published works combining minds and observations of his time, attacking the power invaded by the caste of elites of the "ENA". His witty words are often quoted.

== Prize ==
- 1975: Prix Broquette-Gonin (literature) for Le Bluff du futur.
- 1979: Prix de l'essai for De l’humour.

== Publications ==
- 1953: L'Aide économique des États-unis à la France;Plan Marshall et " defense support ". Recueils et monographies (in French). La Documentation Française. 1953. p. 47.
- 1956: Des rapports de la morphologie régionale et générale et de l'aspect radiographique de la vésicule biliaire...; (in French). impr. de R. Foulon=. 1956. p. 59.
- 1958: La France devant le marché commun (in French). Flammarion. 1958. p. 300.
- 1961: L'Europe des européens (in French). Flammarion. 1961. p. 332. ISBN 2-08-050216-6.
- 1966: Le Paradoxe des technocrates;essay. Documents actualité (in French). Denoël. 1966. p. 221. ISBN 2-20720352-2.
- 1967: Le Contradictionnaire; ou L'Esprit des mots. Humour (in French). éditions Denoël. 1967. p. 363. ISBN 2-20720353-0.
- 1968: Automation et Humanisme. Liberté de l'esprit (in French). Calmann-Lévy. 1968. p. 383.
- 1968: Lettre ouverte à un jeune technocrate; ou Lettre ouverte à un esprit fermé. Lettre ouverte (in French). Paris: Albin Michel. 1968. p. 167.
- 1969: Les Paradoxes de la publicité;la persuasion licite. Documents actualité (in French). éditions Denoël. 1969. p. 202. ISBN 2-20720354-9.
- 1970 : Les Damnés de l'opulence. Liberté de l'esprit (in French). Calmann-Lévy. 1970. p. 331.
- 1970: Armand, Louis; Elgozy, Georges; Fourastié, Jean; Spitaels, Guy (1970). L'Entreprise de demain. Marabout service (in French). Gérard. p. 192.
- 1972: Le Désordinateur; le péril informatique (in French). Calmann-Lévy. 1972. p. 325.
- 1972: Boll, André; Elgozy, Georges (1972). Les Loisirs et l'Avenir. Art, théâtre et métier (in French). Éditions Olivier Perrin. p. 117.
- 1973: Le Fictionnaire;ou, Précis d'indéfinitions. Humour (in French). Denoël. 1973. p. 376. ISBN 2-20721800-7.
- 1974: Le Bluff du futur;demain n'aura pas lieu (in French). Calmann-Lévy. 1974. p. 250.
- 1975: L'Entreprise en péril (in French). Calmann-Lévy. 1975. p. 316. ISBN 978-2702100905.
- 1977: Le Bourgeois socialiste;ou, Pour un post-libéralisme (in French). Calmann-Lévy. 1977. p. 310. ISBN 978-2702102268.
- 1979: De l'humour=. Humour (in French). Éditions Denoël. 1979. p. 268. ISBN 2-20722543-7.
- 1981: L'Esprit des mots, ou, L'Antidictionnaire. Humour (in French). Denoël. 1981. p. 185. ISBN 2-20722717-0.
- 1985: La Vérité sur mon Corps franc d'Afrique, 1942-1943. Le Pavé dans la mare (in French). Éditions du Rocher. 1985. p. 225. ISBN 978-2268003382.
- 1986: La Grande Magouille;Les Paradoxes du politique (in French). Éditions du Rocher. 1986. p. 249. ISBN 978-2268004891.
