= Publicis =

French multinational advertising and public relations company

Publicis Groupe S.A.
- Type: Public
- Traded as: Euronext Paris: PUB; CAC 40 component
- Industry: Advertising; Public relations
- Founded: 1926; 100 years ago
- Founder: Marcel Bleustein-Blanchet
- Headquarters: Paris, France
- Area served: Worldwide
- Key people: Arthur Sadoun (chairman and CEO)
- Products: Branding; Marketing; Market research; Public relations
- Revenue: ▲€17.39 billion (2025)
- Operating income: ▲€2.64 billion (2025)
- Net income: ▼€1.65 billion (2025)
- Total assets: ▲€40.01 billion (2025)
- Total equity: ▼€10.47 billion (2025)
- Number of employees: 114,000 (2025)
- Website: publicisgroupe.com

Publicis Groupe S.A. is a French multinational advertising and public relations company. As of 2024, the company is the largest advertising company in the world by revenue. Based in Paris, it is one of the 'Big Three' advertising companies, alongside WPP and Omnicom. Publicis Groupe S.A. is headed by Arthur Sadoun, and its agencies provide digital and traditional advertising, media services and marketing services to national and multinational clients.

== History ==
The company was founded by 20-year-old Marcel Bleustein-Blanchet in 1926.

After 1945, the company grew rapidly in France's post-war economic boom, becoming the world's fourth-largest agency. Its close ties with top officials of the French government and wide client base across industries contributed to its success.

In 2011, Publicis was named the third-largest marketing group worldwide by revenue, surpassing Interpublic. By the end of 2010, the twin sectors of digital activities and high-growth emerging countries represented one-half of Publicis Groupe's total revenue.

The group had operations in over 202 cities in 105 countries, including a strategic alliance with Dentsu.

In July 2012 it was announced that Publicis Groupe and Omnicom Group would merge to form Publicis Omnicom Group, but by May 2014 it was announced that the deal had fallen through and the Publicis-Omnicom merger would not happen.

In February 2015, Publicis acquired Sapient Corporation to form Publicis.Sapient as the world's largest digital network, which at the time included SapientNitro, Sapient Consulting, the community, DigitasLBI and RazorfishGlobal.

In September 2015, The Publicis Groupe acquired the South African marketing, promotions and activations agency The Creative Counsel. The acquisition was reported as the largest agency buyout ever to happen in South Africa, with an unconfirmed valuation of between R1bn and R1.5bn.

In December 2015, Publicis announced a new organisation with four main divisions:

- Publicis Communications (gathering creative networks Leo Burnett Worldwide, Publicis Worldwide, Saatchi & Saatchi, Bartle Bogle Hegarty (BBH), global design and technology consultancy Nurun, and creative production group Prodigious Brand Logistics and global PR agency MSLGROUP) under the leadership of Arthur Sadoun;
- Publicis Media (gathering the media planning and buying capabilities of Starcom Mediavest Group and ZenithOptimedia) under the leadership of Steve King;
- Publicis.Sapient (gathering technology and digital agencies Razorfish, DigitasLBi and Sapient Corporation) under the leadership of Alan Herrick;
- Publicis Healthcare, already in existence, will remain under the leadership of Nick Colucci.

In addition, in January 2016, Laura Desmond became chief revenue officer.

Since 2016, Publicis has co-organised, with Groupe Les Echos, the annual technology conference, Viva Technology.

In 2017, CEO Maurice Lévy took over as chairman of the supervisory board from Élisabeth Badinter (Bleustein-Blanchet's daughter) and handed over the CEO position to Arthur Sadoun.

In 2018, Publicis partnered with Microsoft to introduce Marcel, an AI-powered internal platform to improve collaboration among its employees.

On 21 January 2019, Publicis announced the deal to sell two of their Latin American agencies, NovaDigitas and Pixeldigital, to BancroftX to form a new marketing firm under the group umbrella BancroftX.

On 14 April 2019, Publicis announced a $4.4 billion deal to acquire data marketing firm Epsilon.

On 4 February 2020, Publicis Groupe India announced the merging of existing agencies – Arc Worldwide, Solutions and Ecosys OOH – to create 'Publicis In-Motion'. In January 2014, Publicis acquired Law & Kenneth, an Indian advertising and digital agency.

On 3 May 2022, French advertising holding company Publicis Groupe acquired Profitero, an e-commerce software company that provides analytics for brands, as marketer clients are increasingly seeking services in commerce.

In September 2022 Publicis Groupe brings home Vietnam's only Effie Award in 2022 with 'Keep Stories Alive'.

On 5 June 2023, Publicis Groupe announced the acquisition of Corra, an e-commerce leader recognised by Adobe as one of the top commerce firms in North America.

In June 2025, the company acquired the advertising mandate for Mars Inc., estimated to be worth $1.7 billion.

In May 2026, Publicis announced its acquisition of data connectivity company LiveRamp for $2.2 billion.

== Operations ==
The company owns several full-service advertising groups that undertake a range of media activities: mobile and interactive online communication, television, magazines & newspapers, cinema and radio, and outdoor. The company's SAMS services include direct marketing/customer relationship management services, sales promotion, healthcare communications, multicultural and ethnic communications, corporate and financial communications, human resource infrastructure, public relations, design services, interactive communications, events marketing and management, sports marketing, and production and pre-press services. Its media services include media planning, media buying, and media sales. Publicis Groupe's Vivaki developed a technological platform supported by Microsoft, Google, Yahoo! and AOL Platform A technologies that offers advertisers the possibility to target specifically defined audiences in a single campaign across multiple networks.

== Controversies ==
Qorvis, a U.S. subsidiary of Publicis, has represented the country of Saudi Arabia since the September 11 attacks and has been accused of helping to whitewash its record on human rights. More recently, the writer Ken Klippenstein obtained leaked documents from Qorvis, which show the PR company pitched a private company on a four- to five-minute propaganda video, which hoped to improve the reputation of its Homestead, Florida shelter for "unaccompanied alien children".

== Subsidiaries ==
As of October 2015, the main subsidiary companies of this group are:

- Publicis Communications
  - Bartle Bogle Hegarty (BBH)
  - Glickman Shamir Samsonov
  - Leo Burnett Worldwide
  - Publicis New York
  - Publicis Worldwide
  - Publicis India
  - Publicis Beehive
  - Digitas
  - Saatchi & Saatchi
  - Epsilon
  - ROKKAN
- Publicis Media
  - Starcom
  - Zenith
  - Frubis
  - Spark Foundry
  - Publicis Collective
  - Digitas
  - GroupeConnect
  - Blue 449
  - Performics
  - Publicis Health Media
  - Publicis Global Delivery (PGD)
  - Publicis Sport & Entertainment
  - Saatchi & Saatchi
- Publicis Sapient
  - 3|SHARE
  - SapientRazorfish
    - Rosetta
  - Publicis Pixelpark
  - Publicis Sapient
    - Vertiba
  - vivaki
- Publicis Health
- Specialized Agencies
  - Médias & Régies
  - PMCI (content and innovation)
  - LionVault (Web3 Specialist Group)
  - MSLGROUP
  - Prodigious Brand Logistics
  - Translate Plus Limited (The Publicis Language Services)
  - Publicis Healthcare Communications Group
  - The Creative Counsel

== PublicisLive ==
PublicisLive is a global event management and strategic communication firm founded in 1995. It has offices in Abu Dhabi, Dubai, Geneva, Istanbul, Kigali, and Paris. PublicisLive is part of Publicis Groupe.
