= Raphaël Hamburger =

French producer and music supervisor (born 1981)

- Born: 2 April 1981 (age 45); Boulogne-Billancourt, France
- Occupations: Producer, composer, music supervisor
- Parents: Michel Berger (father); France Gall (mother)
- Relatives: Jean Hamburger (paternal grandfather); Annette Haas (paternal grandmother); Robert Gall (maternal grandfather); Paul Berthier (maternal great-grandfather)
- Website: Hamburger records

Raphaël Michel Hamburger (born 2 April 1981) is a French producer and soundtrack supervisor.

== Career ==
After studying sound engineering, Hamburger produced albums for several French artists, including the pop-rock singer Adrienne Pauly, the rapper and beatboxer Spleen (artist), HollySiz, June&Ours and Polo & Pan. He provided background vocals for the French version of Sean Ono Lennon's song "Parachute", called "L'Éclipse" (The eclipse), with Mathieu Chedid. He founded Hamburger Records and Radiooooo with Kolkoz artist Benjamin Moreau, and Chi-Fou-Mi Records and MMM agency with Schmooze music supervision and sound production company founder, Matthieu Sibony.

In 2016, Hamburger produced the Ritz Bar compilation. He bought the former Studios Acousti, which he renamed Studios Saint-Germain, and chose Élodie Filleul to be its new manager. In 2018, 37 female singers (including Brigitte, Mayra Andrade, Anaïs Croze, Clara Luciani, Sandra Nkaké, Elisa Tovati, Agnès Jaoui, Olivia Ruiz, La Grande Sophie, Superbus, Elodie Frégé, Inna Modja, Mai Lan and Julie Zenatti) recorded the new version of the anthem of the Mouvement de libération des femmes at Studio Saint-Germain.

In 2019, for the first anniversary of Hamburger's mother's death, Mathieu Chedid dedicated a song, Un autre paradis, to Hamburger that appeared on the album Lettre infinie.

In 2020, Hamburger was prepared to produce Starmania at the Seine Musicale of Boulogne-Billancourt, canceled in 2021 and in 2022 due to the COVID-19 pandemic.

From 2016 to 2020, Hamburger managed a Spa, SkySpa (Laddaparis).

In 2022, Hamburger collaborated on a new adaptation of Starmania with original creator Luc Plamondon, director Thomas Jolly and musical director Victor Le Masne, amongst others. The show was overwhelmingly well-received by critics and audiences. Vanity Fair described a "flamboyant return," calling the show "resolutely modern" and its lighting "breathtaking," although it underlined that the preview show's sound was still too loud in places, and that the light might inconvenience photo-sensitive people. The New York Times reviewed its Paris opening night, marvelling at the show's cultural impact and cult status, calling the new cast "brilliantly fearless". Le Monde lauded its "dark and desperate beauty" and concluded that the version "[did] Michel Berger's violent melancholy justice". Paris Match's write-up of the first Nice preview gently lamented some of the cast's timid start but concluded: "Initially skeptical about a dated show, we ended up falling totally under the spell of a modern, inventive staging that's sure to be remembered for a long time." Le Figaro wrote about a "particularly successful" new cast which managed "never to imitate" the crushing legacy of its predecessors, although it found the new arrangements lacked subtlety in places. It concluded: "After a first part that's a little cold and slow, Starmania blossoms in a second act that's boisterous, invigorating, breathless and full of youth." Marianne stood out in its harshness, criticizing the lack of point of view in the costumes of Nicolas Ghesquière and the political dimension being "erased in favor of love stories", "programmed for the Instagram generation."

== Personal life ==
Hamburger is the son of French singers Michel Berger and France Gall, the grandson of French physician, surgeon and essayist Jean Hamburger, the great-grandson of the co-founder of Manécanterie des Petits Chanteurs à la Croix de Bois, Paul Berthier, and godson of French stand-up comedian and actor Coluche.

At a young age Hamburger was severely injured and almost died in a scooter accident. He was known as a difficult teenager, and after his sister Pauline died on 15 December 1997 from cystic fibrosis, he went through an acrimonious trial in June 1998 against his aunt and his father's former companion, Véronique Sanson, because he wanted to transfer Pauline's remains to be next to their father's in a closed vault in the Montmartre Cemetery. After the 26 October hearing, and a failed mediation on 11 January 1999, there were new hearings on 31 May and 28 June. On 4 October the Tribunal de grande instance de Paris gave the order to transfer Berger's remains next to his daughter's.

Hamburger is a regular poker player.

He and French designer Laura Daniel are parents to two children: Ella, born in 2021, and Laszlo.

== Filmography ==
As musical supervisor unless otherwise specified:

=== Film ===
- 2012: Maniac
- 2012: Nous York
- 2012: Comme des frères
- 2012: Asterix and Obelix: God Save Britannia
- 2013: The Gilded Cage
- 2013: The Past
- 2013: Blood Ties
- 2014: Grace of Monaco
- 2014: La Crème de la crème
- 2014: The Search
- 2014: Colt 45
- 2014: Eden
- 2014: Le père Noël
- 2015: La Résistance de l'air
- 2015: Nos femmes
- 2015: Un moment d'égarement
- 2015: Tout, tout de suite
- 2015: Desierto
- 2016: Two Is a Family
- 2016: Things to Come
- 2016: The Jews
- 2016: Open at Night
- 2017: Redoutable
- 2018: Maya
- 2021: Bergman Island
- 2021: Annette
- 2022: Rodeo
- 2022: One Fine Morning
- 2023: The Animal Kingdom
- 2025: Arco
- 2027: Johnny

=== Television ===
- 2013: Casting(s) (15 episodes)

=== Short film ===
- 2014: Quelques secondes (producer)
- 2014: Hybris

=== Awards ===
- 2014: Best French short film at Festival du film court de Nyon for Hybris

== Bibliography ==
- Quelque chose en nous de Michel Berger. Yves Bigot, Editions Don Quichotte, 2012
- Dictionnaire étonnant des célébrités. Jean-Louis Beaucarnot, Frédéric Dumoulin, Editions First, 2015
