= All Is Forgiven =

All Is Forgiven may refer to:

- All Is Forgiven (film), French film
- All Is Forgiven (TV series), American sitcom
- All Is Forgiven (album), a 2005 album by Tex, Don and Charlie
- Bhool Chuk Maaf (transl. All Is Forgiven), a 2025 Indian Hindi-language film by Karan Sharma

== See also ==
- Tout est pardonné (disambiguation) same phrase in French
