= Bergman Island =

Bergman Island may refer to:

- Bergman Island (2006 film), a documentary film directed by Marie Nyreröd and starring Ingmar Bergman.
- Bergman Island (2021 film), a romantic drama film written and directed by Mia Hansen-Løve and starring Vicky Krieps, Tim Roth, Mia Wasikowska, and Anders Danielsen Lie.
