= List of accolades received by 20th Century Women =

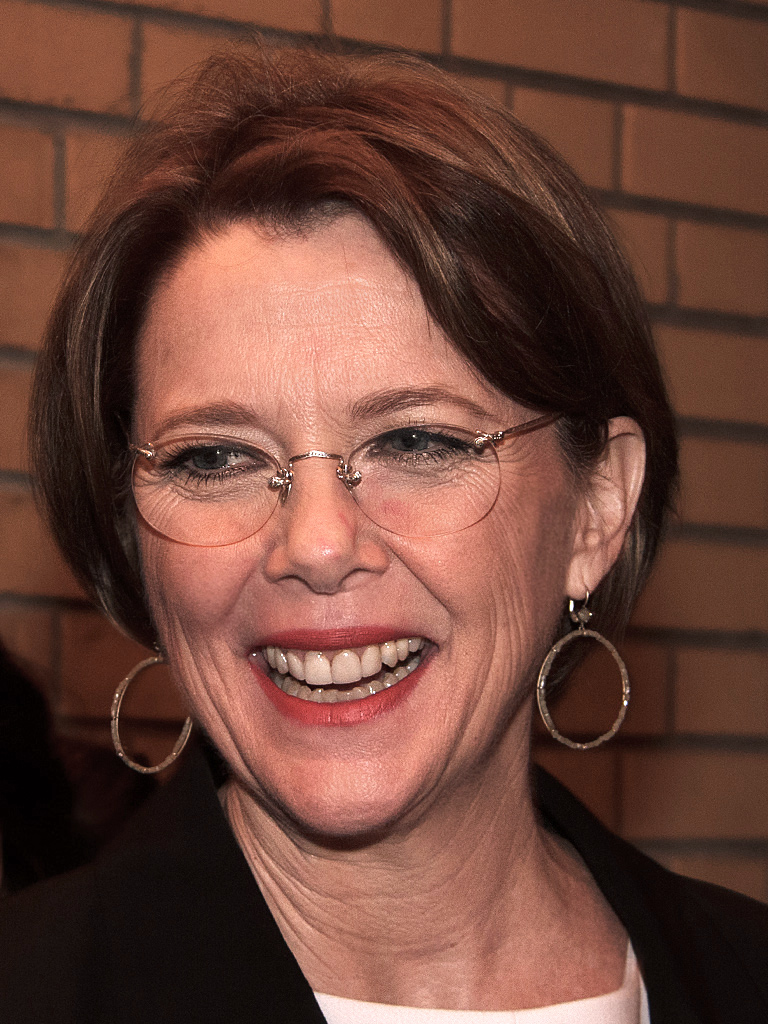
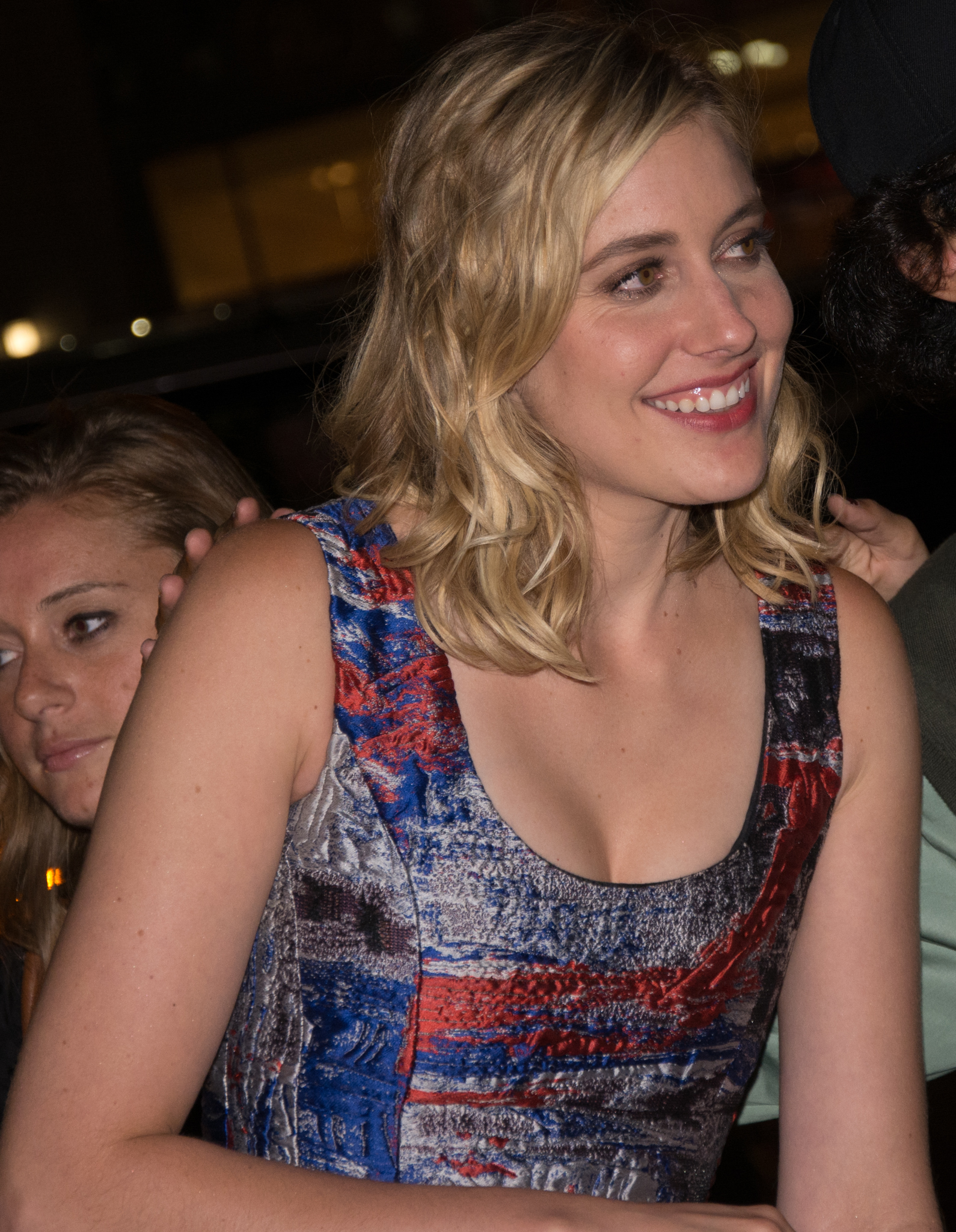
- Annette Bening (left) and Greta Gerwig (right) received several nominations for their performance in the film.
Accolades
| Award | Won | Nominated | Standing |
| AARP Annual Movies for Grownups Awards | 2 | 2 | —N/a |
| Academy Awards | 0 | 1 | —N/a |
| Alliance of Women Film Journalists | 1 | 4 | —N/a |
| Austin Film Critics Association | 0 | 3 | —N/a |
| Critics' Choice Awards | 0 | 3 | —N/a |
| Dallas-Fort Worth Film Critics Association | 0 | 3 | 4th Place, 5th Place, 8th Place |
| Detroit Film Critics Society | 2 | 4 | —N/a |
| Dorian Awards | 0 | 3 | —N/a |
| Florida Film Critics Circle | 0 | 4 | —N/a |
| Golden Globe Awards | 0 | 2 | —N/a |
| Gotham Awards | 0 | 1 | —N/a |
| Houston Film Critics Society | 0 | 1 | —N/a |
| Independent Spirit Awards | 0 | 2 | —N/a |
| IndieWire Critics Poll | 0 | 2 | 6th Place, 9th Place |
| London Film Critics Circle | 0 | 1 | —N/a |
| National Society of Film Critics | 0 | 1 | 2nd Place |
| Palm Springs International Film Festival | 1 | 1 | —N/a |
| San Diego Film Critics Society | 0 | 3 | —N/a |
| San Francisco Film Critics Circle | 0 | 2 | —N/a |
| Satellite Awards | 0 | 1 | —N/a |
| St. Louis Gateway Film Critics Association | 0 | 1 | —N/a |
| Washington D.C. Area Film Critics Association | 0 | 3 | —N/a |
| Women Film Critics Circle | 0 | 3 | —N/a |
- Total number of awards and nominations
| Totals | 6 | 51 | N/A |
- References

20th Century Women is a 2016 American comedy-drama film directed and written by Mike Mills, based in part on Mills' childhood. Starring Annette Bening, Elle Fanning, Greta Gerwig, Billy Crudup, and Lucas Jade Zumann, the film focuses on the story of three women who explore love and freedom in Southern California during the late 1970s. The film had its world premiere at the New York Film Festival as the Centerpiece on October 8, 2016, and was theatrically released on December 28, 2016 by A24. The film was released to universal acclaim, with Rotten Tomatoes listing an approval rating of 89%, based on 159 reviews, with an average rating of 7.8/10, and Metacritic scoring it at 83 out of 100, based on 40 reviews.

20th Century Women received a Best Original Screenplay nomination at the Academy Awards. The film received three nominations at the Critics' Choice Awards, including Best Actress for Bening, Best Supporting Actress for Gerwig, and Best Acting Ensemble. The film received two nominations at the Golden Globe Awards, including Best Motion Picture – Musical or Comedy and Best Actress – Motion Picture Musical or Comedy for Bening. The film also received a Best Actress nomination for Bening at the Satellite Awards.

== Accolades ==
| Award | Date of ceremony | Category | Recipient(s) and nominee(s) | Result | Ref. |
|---|---|---|---|---|---|
| AARP Annual Movies for Grownups Awards | February 6, 2017 | Best Actress | Annette Bening | Won | |
| AARP Annual Movies for Grownups Awards | February 6, 2017 | Best Intergenerational Film | 20th Century Women | Won | |
| Academy Awards | February 26, 2017 | Best Original Screenplay | Mike Mills | Nominated | |
| Alliance of Women Film Journalists | December 21, 2016 | Best Supporting Actress | Greta Gerwig | Nominated | |
| Alliance of Women Film Journalists | December 21, 2016 | Best Screenplay, Original | Mike Mills | Nominated | |
| Alliance of Women Film Journalists | December 21, 2016 | Best Ensemble Cast – Casting Director | Mark Bennett and Laura Rosenthal | Nominated | |
| Alliance of Women Film Journalists | December 21, 2016 | Actress Defying Age and Ageism | Annette Bening | Won (Note: Tied with Isabelle Huppert for Elle and Things to Come) | |
| Austin Film Critics Association | December 28, 2016 | Best Actress | Annette Bening | Nominated | |
| Austin Film Critics Association | December 28, 2016 | Best Supporting Actress | Greta Gerwig | Nominated | |
| Austin Film Critics Association | December 28, 2016 | Best Original Screenplay | Mike Mills | Nominated | |
| Critics' Choice Awards | December 11, 2016 | Best Actress | Annette Bening | Nominated | |
| Critics' Choice Awards | December 11, 2016 | Best Supporting Actress | Greta Gerwig | Nominated | |
| Critics' Choice Awards | December 11, 2016 | Best Acting Ensemble | The cast of 20th Century Women | Nominated | |
| Dallas–Fort Worth Film Critics Association | December 13, 2016 | Best Film | 20th Century Women | 8th Place | |
| Dallas–Fort Worth Film Critics Association | December 13, 2016 | Best Actress | Annette Bening | 5th Place | |
| Dallas–Fort Worth Film Critics Association | December 13, 2016 | Best Supporting Actress | Greta Gerwig | 4th Place | |
| Detroit Film Critics Society | December 19, 2016 | Best Actress | Annette Bening | Nominated | |
| Detroit Film Critics Society | December 19, 2016 | Best Supporting Actress | Elle Fanning | Nominated | |
| Detroit Film Critics Society | December 19, 2016 | Best Supporting Actress | Greta Gerwig | Won (Note: Tied with Viola Davis for Fences) | |
| Detroit Film Critics Society | December 19, 2016 | Best Ensemble | The cast of 20th Century Women | Won | |
| Dorian Awards | January 26, 2017 | Film of the Year | 20th Century Women | Nominated | |
| Dorian Awards | January 26, 2017 | Film Performance of the Year — Actress | Annette Bening | Nominated | |
| Dorian Awards | January 26, 2017 | Screenplay of the Year | Mike Mills | Nominated | |
| Florida Film Critics Circle | December 23, 2016 | Best Actress | Annette Bening | Nominated | |
| Florida Film Critics Circle | December 23, 2016 | Best Supporting Actress | Greta Gerwig | Nominated | |
| Florida Film Critics Circle | December 23, 2016 | Best Original Screenplay | Mike Mills | Nominated | |
| Florida Film Critics Circle | December 23, 2016 | Best Ensemble | The cast of 20th Century Women | Nominated | |
| Golden Globe Awards | January 8, 2017 | Best Motion Picture – Musical or Comedy | 20th Century Women | Nominated | |
| Golden Globe Awards | January 8, 2017 | Best Actress – Motion Picture Comedy or Musical | Annette Bening | Nominated | |
| Gotham Awards | November 28, 2016 | Best Actress | Annette Bening | Nominated | |
| Houston Film Critics Society | January 6, 2017 | Best Supporting Actress | Greta Gerwig | Nominated | |
| Independent Spirit Awards | February 25, 2017 | Best Female Lead | Annette Bening | Nominated | |
| Independent Spirit Awards | February 25, 2017 | Best Screenplay | Mike Mills | Nominated | |
| IndieWire Critics Poll | December 19, 2016 | Best Actress | Annette Bening | 9th Place | |
| IndieWire Critics Poll | December 19, 2016 | Best Supporting Actress | Greta Gerwig | 6th Place | |
| London Film Critics Circle | January 22, 2017 | Supporting Actress of the Year | Greta Gerwig | Nominated | |
| National Society of Film Critics | January 7, 2017 | Best Actress | Annette Bening | 2nd Place (Note: Tied with Sandra Hüller for Toni Erdmann) | |
| Palm Springs International Film Festival | January 2, 2017 | Career Achievement Award | Annette Bening | Won | |
| San Diego Film Critics Society | December 12, 2016 | Best Actress | Annette Bening | Nominated | |
| San Diego Film Critics Society | December 12, 2016 | Best Supporting Actress | Greta Gerwig | Nominated | |
| San Diego Film Critics Society | December 12, 2016 | Best Ensemble | The cast of 20th Century Women | Nominated | |
| San Francisco Film Critics Circle | December 11, 2016 | Best Actress | Annette Bening | Nominated | |
| San Francisco Film Critics Circle | December 11, 2016 | Best Supporting Actress | Greta Gerwig | Nominated | |
| Satellite Awards | February 19, 2017 | Best Actress | Annette Bening | Nominated | |
| St. Louis Film Critics Association | December 18, 2016 | Best Supporting Actress | Greta Gerwig | Nominated | |
| Washington D.C. Area Film Critics Association | December 5, 2016 | Best Actress | Annette Bening | Nominated | |
| Washington D.C. Area Film Critics Association | December 5, 2016 | Best Supporting Actress | Greta Gerwig | Nominated | |
| Washington D.C. Area Film Critics Association | December 5, 2016 | Best Ensemble | The cast of 20th Century Women | Nominated | |
| Women Film Critics Circle | December 19, 2016 | Best Movie about Women | 20th Century Women | Nominated | |
| Women Film Critics Circle | December 19, 2016 | Best Ensemble | The cast of 20th Century Women | Nominated | |
| Women Film Critics Circle | December 19, 2016 | Courage in Acting | Annette Bening | Nominated | |
