= International Federation of Pueri Cantores =

Catholic music organisation

FIPC
- International Federation of Pueri Cantores
- Formation: 1944
- Founder: Fernand Maillet
- Founded at: Paris
- President: Elisabeth von Waldstein
- Website: https://www.puericantores.org/

The International Federation of Pueri Cantores (FIPC, Latin: Foederatio Internationalis Pueri Cantores) is an association of around 1,000 Catholic children's, boys', girls' and youth choirs from all over the world. The federation is also represented in national associations in 43 different countries and has around 40,000 singers worldwide.

In 1944, French abbot Fernand Maillet founded the association under the guiding principle of commitment to peace and served as its first president. In 1965, the Vatican Secretariat of State confirmed the statutes of the “Pueri Cantores,” which was thus officially recognized as a church movement. The internal church reforms of the Second Vatican Council made it possible to include girls' choirs in the association. Since August 2025, the president of the association has been Elisabeth von Waldstein from Sweden.

== History ==
In 1903, Pope Pius X published an apostolic letter in the form of a motu proprio on church music. The letter is entitled “Tra le sollecitudini,” and in it he promoted and ordered the renewal of church music through renaissance ideas. In the years that followed, inspired by the papal letter, French music students Paul Berthier and Pierre Martin founded the schola cantorum “Petits Chanteurs à la Croix de Bois” in Paris in 1907. In 1921, the Schola and the Cantoria di Belleville merged, and by 1931 this choir had already achieved enormous fame.

In 1944, the first French “Association of Pueri Cantores” was formed, and on May 6, 1947, it was recognized as a Catholic action by the assembly of French bishops and cardinals. Just four months later, 3,000 young singers gathered for the first international congress, at the invitation of the “Petits Chanteurs” in Paris.

Two years later, in April 1949, the second congress, this time in Rome, brought the loose French association onto the world church stage. On White Sunday, Pope Pius XII celebrated a joint mass with the 3,000 boys from 15 countries and praised the singing in a letter to Abbé Fernand Maillet. On April 24, 1950, delegates from numerous international choirs in Paris decided to officially establish an international association.

In 1951, the Pueri Cantores association received approval of its statutes from the Holy See and from the hands of Substitute Montini, later Pope Paul VI. This also recognized the election of Maillet as its first president. A list of members from 1952 mentions 991 choirs from 49 countries, including many French colonies. Several national associations had already been founded by this time, including the German national association, which had been in existence since 1951.

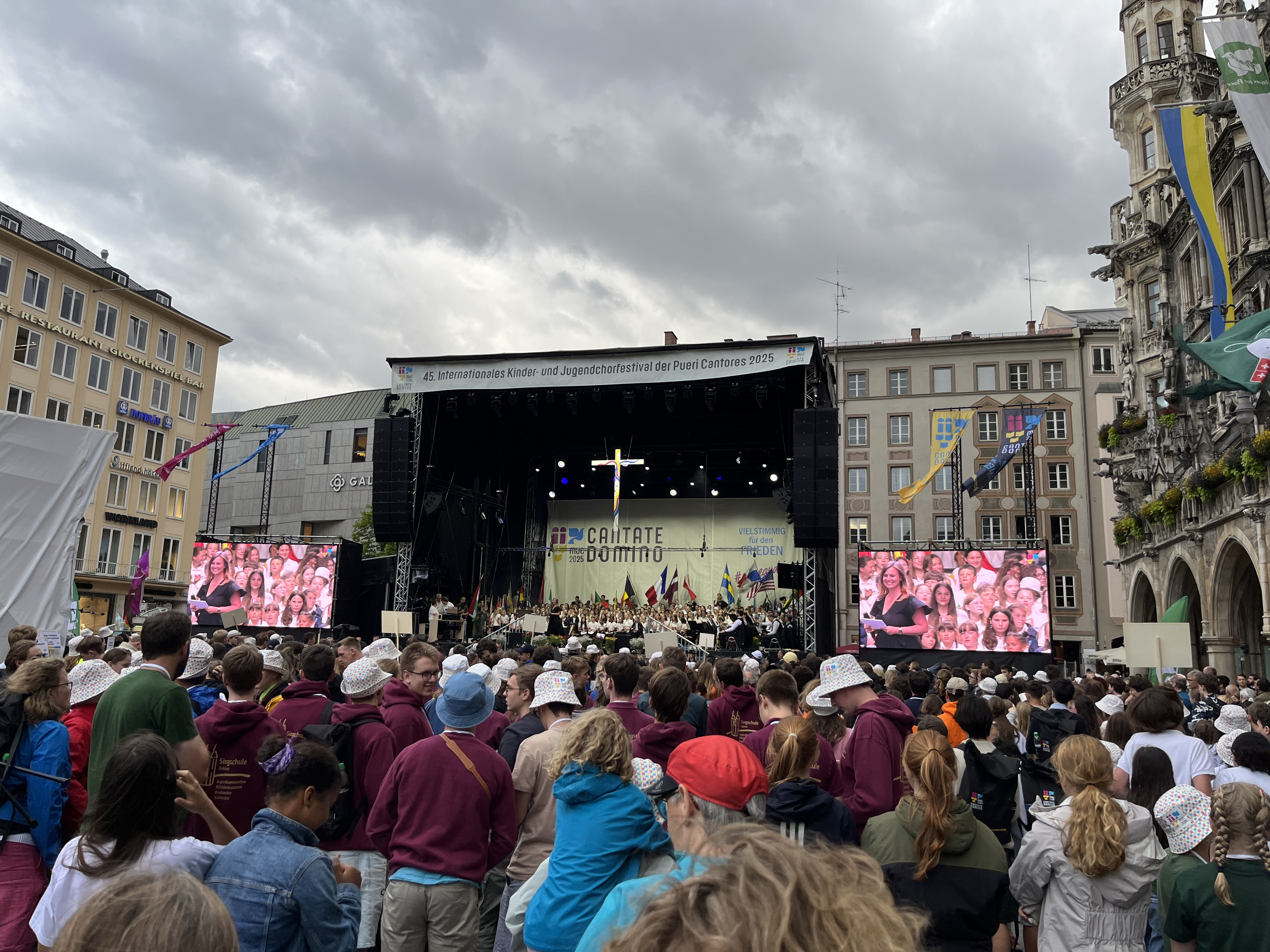
The stage on Munich's Marienplatz during the 45th International Choir Festival of the Pueri Cantores in 2025

In 1956, Pope Pius XII chose Dominic Savio, a disciple of St. John Bosco who had been canonized shortly before, as the patron saint of the Pueri Cantores. On February 15, 1965, Maillet's successor, Monsignor Fiorenzo Romita, was notified of the final approval of the statutes. On January 31, 1996, the Pontifical Council for the Laity recognized the Pueri Cantores as an international association of the faithful under papal law.

== Organization ==
Since August 2025, the president of the International Pueri Cantores Association (FIPC) has been Elisabeth von Waldstein from Sweden, with José Martinez Gonzalez from Spain and Marco Aurelio Lischta from Brazil as vice presidents. The treasurer is Daniele Perri from Italy, and the secretary, Alberto Veggiotti, is also from Italy. The general manager is Matthias Balzer, who is German.

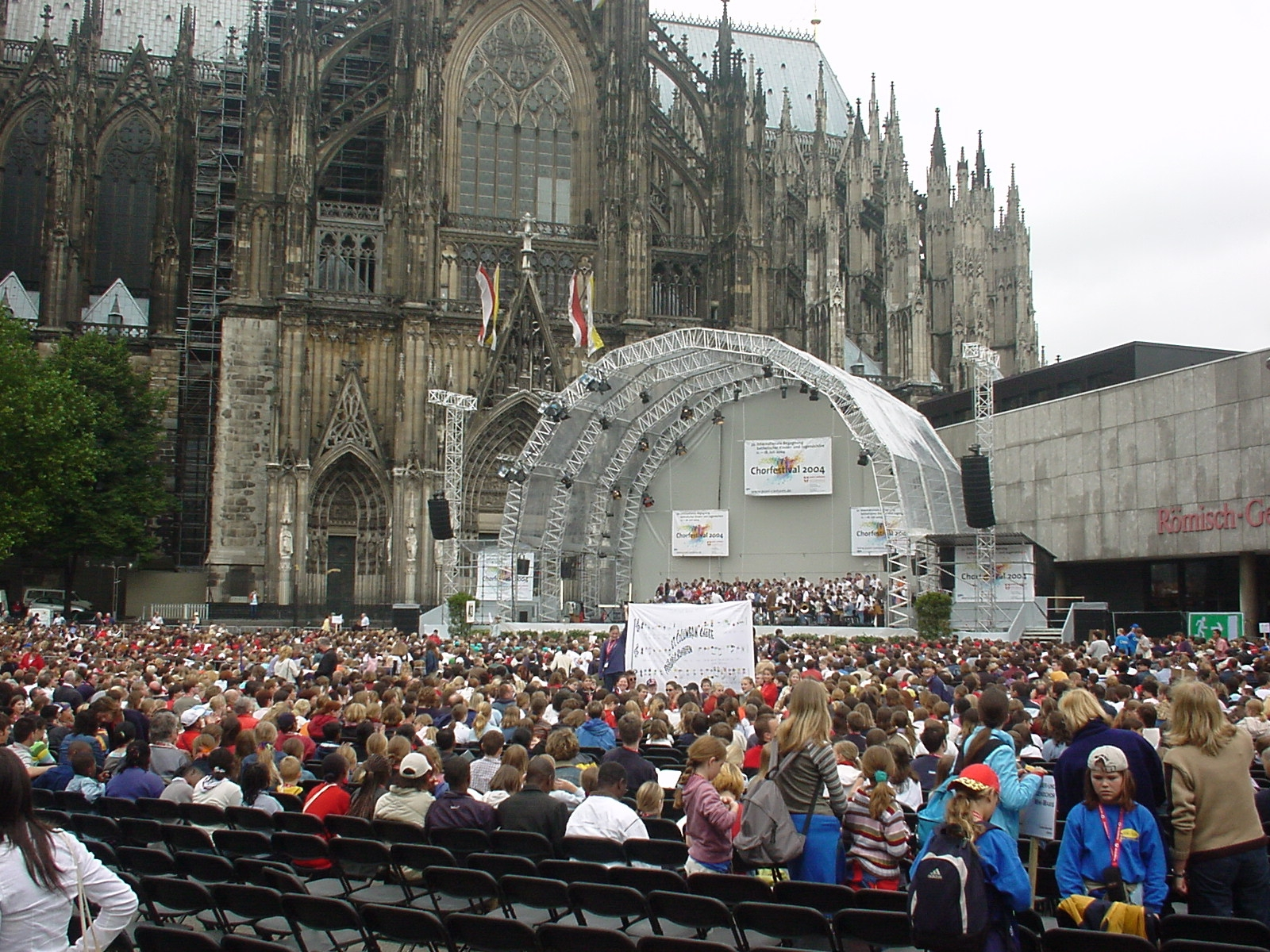
2004 International Choir Festival in front of Cologne Cathedral

The FIPC is represented in 43 countries on all continents. It has 26 national associations under its umbrella, and there are national corresponding federations in 16 other countries, even if there are no fully formed federation there.

=== International Festivals ===
Since its founding, numerous international meetings have taken place, most recently in Rome in 2000, in Lyon in 2002, in Cologne in July 2004, in Rome from December 27, 2005, to January 1, 2006, in Krakow from July 11 to 15, 2007, in Stockholm from July 8 to 12, 2009, December 28, 2010, to January 1, 2011, in Rome, July 11 to 15, 2018 in Barcelona, July 13 to 17, 2022 in Florence, in Rome (2023/2024) and between July 16 and 20, 2025 in Munich with around 4,500 singers. The next international Pueri Cantores Festival is planned for July 14 to 18, 2027 in Malaga.

== Literature ==
- Martin, Andrew. "Internationale Vereinigung der Pueri Cantores". Die Geistlichen Gemeinschaften der katholischen Kirche – Kompendium (in German). Leipzig: St. Benno-Verlag. pp. 159–160. ISBN 3-7462-1995-7.
- Pope Francis (2023-12-30). "Address of His Holiness Pope Francis to the International Federation of Pueri Cantores". ´. Dicastery for Communication.
