= Father of My Children =

2009 film

- Film poster
- French: Le Père de mes enfants
- Directed by: Mia Hansen-Løve
- Written by: Mia Hansen-Løve
- Produced by: Oliver Damian; Philippe Martin; David Thion
- Starring: Louis-Do de Lencquesaing; Chiara Caselli
- Cinematography: Pascal Auffray
- Edited by: Marion Monnier
- Distributed by: Les Films du Losange
- Release dates: 17 May 2009 (Cannes); 16 December 2009 (France)
- Running time: 112 minutes
- Country: France
- Language: French
- Budget: $2.3 million
- Box office: $1.2 million

Father of My Children (French: Le Père de mes enfants) is a 2009 French drama film directed by Mia Hansen-Løve. It won the Jury Special Prize in the Un Certain Regard section at the 2009 Cannes Film Festival. It is based in part on the life of the late Humbert Balsan.

== Plot ==
Grégoire Canvel is a French film producer who has his own film company. Despite his luxurious country home, apartment in Paris and film company he is drowning in debt. Grégoire continues to take on more work despite his slate of current films continuing to rack up costs. Upon learning that he is 4 million euros in debt, that his catalogue of films, already mortgaged, is only worth less than a million euros and that his bank refuses to extend him any more credit, Grégoire burns his bills and shoots himself in the street.

In the wake of his death his wife Sylvia attempts to honour her husband's memory by completing the work currently in production. However her attempts fail and she is forced to liquidate the company.

Meanwhile, while waiting for her mother outside of the production office, Grégoire and Sylvia's eldest daughter, Clémence, overhears people talking about her father and how he led a double life and had a son from whom he was estranged. While Sylvia is in Sweden trying to secure funding for one of Grégoire's last films, Clémence digs through her fathers papers and discovers he did have a son named Moune to whom he sent money. Though she meets with Moune's mother, Isabelle, she ultimately does not meet Moune himself.

On the day the company is dissolved, Sylvia and her three daughters go to Grégoire's office one final time. Afterwards they leave Paris and though Clémence had wanted to visit her father's grave in order to say goodbye, her mother tells her there is simply no time. In the backseat of the car Clémence begins to cry as they pass through the city.

== Cast ==
- Louis-Do de Lencquesaing as Grégoire Canvel
- Alice de Lencquesaing as Clémence
- Michaël Abiteboul as The banker
- Chiara Caselli as Sylvia Canvel
- Manelle Driss as Billie Canvel
- Sandrine Dumas as Valérie
- Eric Elmosnino as Serge

== Production ==
Hansen-Løve based the character of Grégoire on Humbert Balsan whom she had met after she had made her first short film and who had originally intended to produce her first film All Is Forgiven before he committed suicide.

She cast her cousin Igor Hansen-Løve in the role of Arthur Malkavian, a young screen writer whose film Grégoire wants to produce, giving him an experience similar to her own with Humbert Balsan.

== Reception ==
Father of My Children has a rating of 76 on Metacritic and 91% on Rotten Tomatoes indicating widespread positive reviews.

== Accolades ==
Award / Film Festival	Category	Recipients and nominees	Result
Cannes Film Festival	Un Certain Regard – Special Jury Prize		Won
Cabourg Film Festival	Prix Premiers Rendez-vous	Alice de Lencquesaing	Won
Film Critics Circle of Australia Awards	Best Foreign Language Film		Nominated
Lumière Awards	Best Screenplay	Mia Hansen-Løve	Won
