= Constance Rousseau =

French actress (born 1989)

- Born: 13 August 1989 (age 36); Paris, France
- Occupation: Actress
- Years active: 2007-present

Constance Rousseau (born 13 August 1989) is a French actress. She appeared in more than twelve films since 2007.

== Selected filmography ==
=== Cinema ===
- 2007: All is forgiven by Mia Hansen-Løve – young Pamela
- 2011: Kataï (short film) by Claire Doyon – Lucie
- 2011: Un monde sans femmes (medium length film) by Guillaume Brac – Juliette
- 2012: Pisseuse (short film) by Géraldine Keiflin
- 2013: Simon Killer by Antonio Campos – Marianne
- 2014: L'Année prochaine de Vania Leturcq – Clothilde
- 2016: Daguerrotype by Kiyoshi Kurosawa – Marie Hégray
- 2019: Deux fils by Félix Moati – Iris
- 2021: Cette musique ne joue pour personne by Samuel Benchetrit - Roxane

=== Television ===
- 2009: Le Bourgeois gentilhomme by Christian de Chalonge – Lucile
- 2011: La Mauvaise Rencontre by Josée Dayan – Marianne
- 2014: Ceux de 14 (mini-série) by Didier Dolna and Olivier Schatzky
