= Goodbye First Love =

2011 film by Mia Hansen-Løve

- Theatrical release poster
- French: Un amour de jeunesse
- Directed by: Mia Hansen-Løve
- Screenplay by: Mia Hansen-Løve
- Produced by: Phillipe Martin; David Thion
- Starring: Lola Créton; Sebastian Urzendowsky; Magne-Håvard Brekke; Valérie Bonneton; Serge Renko; Özay Fecht
- Cinematography: Stéphane Fontaine
- Edited by: Marion Monnier
- Production companies: Les Films Pelléas; Razor Film; Arte France Cinéma; ZDF/Arte; Rhône-Alpes Cinéma; Jouror Productions
- Distributed by: Les Films du Losange (France); Peripher Filmverleih (Germany)
- Release dates: 6 July 2011 (France); 27 September 2012 (Germany)
- Running time: 110 minutes
- Countries: France; Germany
- Language: French
- Budget: €4 million
- Box office: $64,925

Goodbye First Love (French: Un amour de jeunesse) is a 2011 romantic drama film written and directed by Mia Hansen-Løve. It was selected for the main competition section at the 2011 Locarno International Film Festival.

== Plot ==
Camille is 15 years old and passionately in love and lust with her boyfriend Sullivan, who is 19. Sullivan is planning a 10-month trip to South America with his friends. He is not taking Camille with him, which makes her feel insecure and resentful. She irritates Sullivan by repeatedly insisting that he does not love her because he is leaving her. Before Sullivan departs, they spend one last idyllic getaway in Camille's mountain home in the Ardèche. Though the vacation starts off happily, Camille grows unhappy when Sullivan is away too long on an errand and leaves her alone. After a brief fight, they reconcile, and Sullivan promises to always love her.

Eventually Sullivan leaves for his trip, leaving Camille despondent. Though Camille regularly receives letters from Sullivan, they eventually take on an unhappy tone; eventually Sullivan reveals that he wants to break off their relationship, and he stops writing. A depressed Camille attempts suicide, but survives, and resolves to move on with her life.

Four years later, Camille staves off her loneliness with work and school, where she is studying architecture. During her studies, she gradually falls in love with her much older professor Lorenz, in whom she sees a stable and secure influence and intellectual match. Four more years pass, and Camille, now with a career and a relationship with Lorenz, encounters Sullivan's mother by chance and reconnects with her old boyfriend. Coincidentally, on the day she meets with Sullivan and realizes that she is still attracted to him, she suffers a miscarriage.

When Lorenz leaves on a work trip, Camille and Sullivan begin an affair and confess that they never stopped loving each other. Consequently, her relationship with Lorenz becomes strained, especially when she secretly plans to take a trip to Sullivan's new home in Marseilles soon after Lorenz's return, under the guise of visiting a friend. However, a strike cancels her train. Though she is disappointed, a nonchalant Sullivan texts her saying that he is working anyway, and they can meet another time. Sometime later, Camille visits her mother, who gives her a letter recently sent by Sullivan. Sullivan writes that he dreamt of her while in bed with someone else, and dreamed that she was pregnant with his child. He says that they must break up because they are too early or too late to try being in love again, that he cannot bear the pain of their love, and that he hopes to find her again in the future. Camille is crushed.

Time passes, and Camille restores her relationship with Lorenz. Back at her mountain home in Ardèche, she invites him to the nearby river, and he tells her that he will meet her there shortly. She brings the hat that Sullivan had bought her for their own getaway years before, but unbeknownst to her as she plays in the river, it blows into the water and floats away as the film ends.

== Cast ==
- Lola Créton as Camille
- Sebastian Urzendowsky as Sullivan
- Magne-Håvard Brekke as Lorenz
- Valérie Bonneton as Camille's mother
- Serge Renko as Camille's father
- Özay Fecht as Sullivan's mother

== Production ==
=== Filming ===
Lola Créton was 16 years old when the film was shot. Director Mia Hansen-Løve said it was a big deal for Lola to play nude scenes. "But what's amazing is that, when the cameras rolled, she was free and sensuous like a cat. It was as if she was discovering her own sexuality before our eyes, but, as soon as the filming stopped, she'd retreat behind sheets, clothes immediately."

=== Music ===
- "Volver a los 17" by Violeta Parra
- "Gracias a la vida" by Violeta Parra
- "Little Ticks of Time" by Matt McGinn
- "Music for a Found Harmonium" by Penguin Cafe Orchestra
- "Wasps in the Woodpile" by Andrew Cronshaw
- "The Water" by Johnny Flynn and Laura Marling

=== Filming locations ===
- Ardèche, France
- Copenhagen, Denmark
- Dessau, Saxony-Anhalt, Germany
- Kastrup, Amager, Denmark (sea baths)
- Paris, France
- Sanatorium d'Aincourt, Aincourt, Val-d'Oise, France

== Critical response ==
On the review aggregator website Rotten Tomatoes, the film holds an approval rating of 83% based on 54 reviews, with an average rating of 7.3/10. The website's critics consensus reads, "Goodbye First Love captures teen ardor with a patiently naturalistic approach, further proving writer-director Mia Hansen-Løve is a major talent to watch." Metacritic gives the film a score of 80 out of 100 based on 21 reviews, indicating "generally favorable reviews".

Noel Murray of The A.V. Club said that "Goodbye First Love sometimes tells when it should show, and in their younger guises, particularly, Créton and Urzendowsky come off as so self-absorbed that they're almost insufferable".

Jordan Mintzer of The Hollywood Reporter wrote that the film is "[a]n airy yet incisive third feature from French auteur Mia Hansen-Love".

== Awards and nominations ==
- 2011: Locarno International Film Festival: Special Mention
- 2011: Gijon Film Festival: Official Selection
