= Something in the Air (2012 film) =

2012 film by Olivier Assayas

- Theatrical release poster
- French: Après mai
- Directed by: Olivier Assayas
- Written by: Olivier Assayas
- Produced by: Nathanaël Karmitz; Charles Gillibert
- Starring: Clément Métayer; Lola Créton; Félix Armand; Carole Combes; India Salvor Menuez; Hugo Conzelmann; Martin Loizillon; André Marcon
- Cinematography: Éric Gautier
- Edited by: Luc Barnier
- Production companies: MK2; Vortex Sutra; France 3 Cinéma
- Distributed by: MK2 Films
- Release dates: 3 September 2012 (Venice); 14 November 2012 (France)
- Running time: 122 minutes
- Country: France
- Language: French
- Budget: €5.4 million
- Box office: $1.3 million

Something in the Air (French: Après mai, lit. 'After May') is a 2012 French coming-of-age drama film written and directed by Olivier Assayas.

== Premise ==
In 1971, French student Gilles gets entangled in contemporary political turmoils. He moves between ideological and political activism and the continuing development of his artistic expression. Gilles and others from his group evolve and mature and choose different paths that reflect different expressions of their youthful ideals.

== Cast ==
- Clément Métayer as Gilles
- Lola Créton as Christine
- Félix Armand as Alain
- Carole Combes as Laure
- India Salvor Menuez as Leslie
- Hugo Conzelmann as Jean-Pierre
- Martin Loizillon as Rackam le Rouge
- André Marcon as Gilles' father

== Production ==
Something in the Air was written and directed by Olivier Assayas.

== Release ==
The film was selected to compete for the Golden Lion at the 69th Venice International Film Festival, where it premiered on 3 September 2012.

== Accolades ==
Assayas won the Best Screenplay Award at Venice.

The film won the Georges Delerue Award for Best Soundtrack/Sound Design at Film Fest Gent in 2012.
