= 2016 National Society of Film Critics Awards =

US film award edition

51st NSFC Awards

January 7, 2017

Best Film:
Moonlight

The 51st National Society of Film Critics Awards, given on 7 January 2017, honored the best in film for 2016.

== Winners ==
Winners are listed in boldface along with the runner-up positions and counts from the final round:

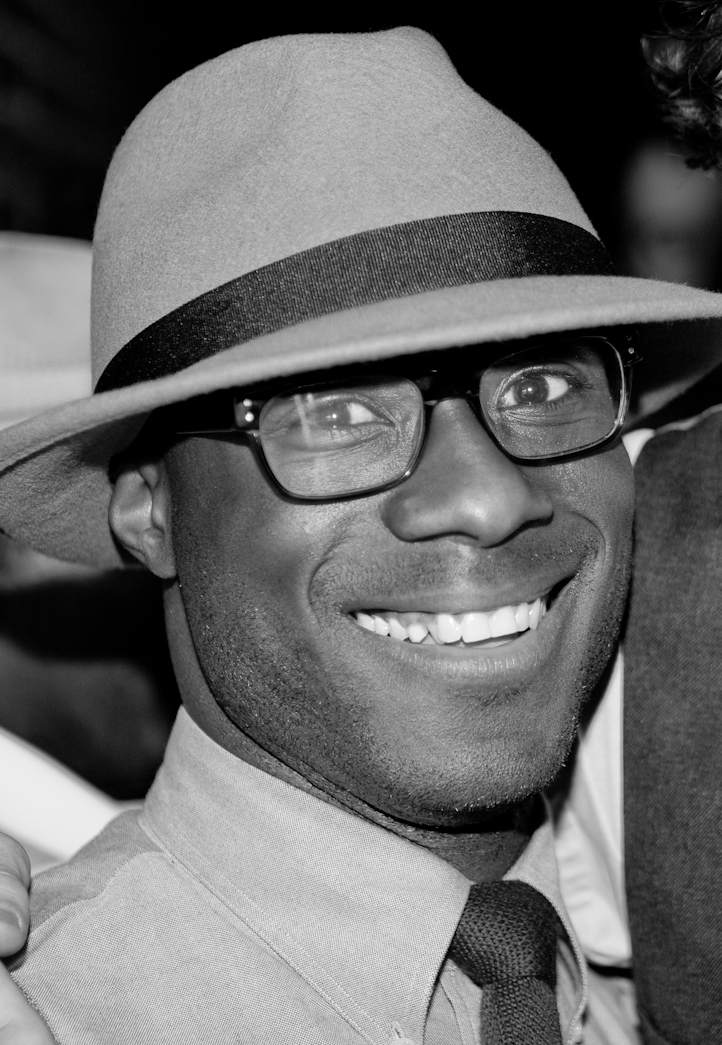
Barry Jenkins, Best Director winner

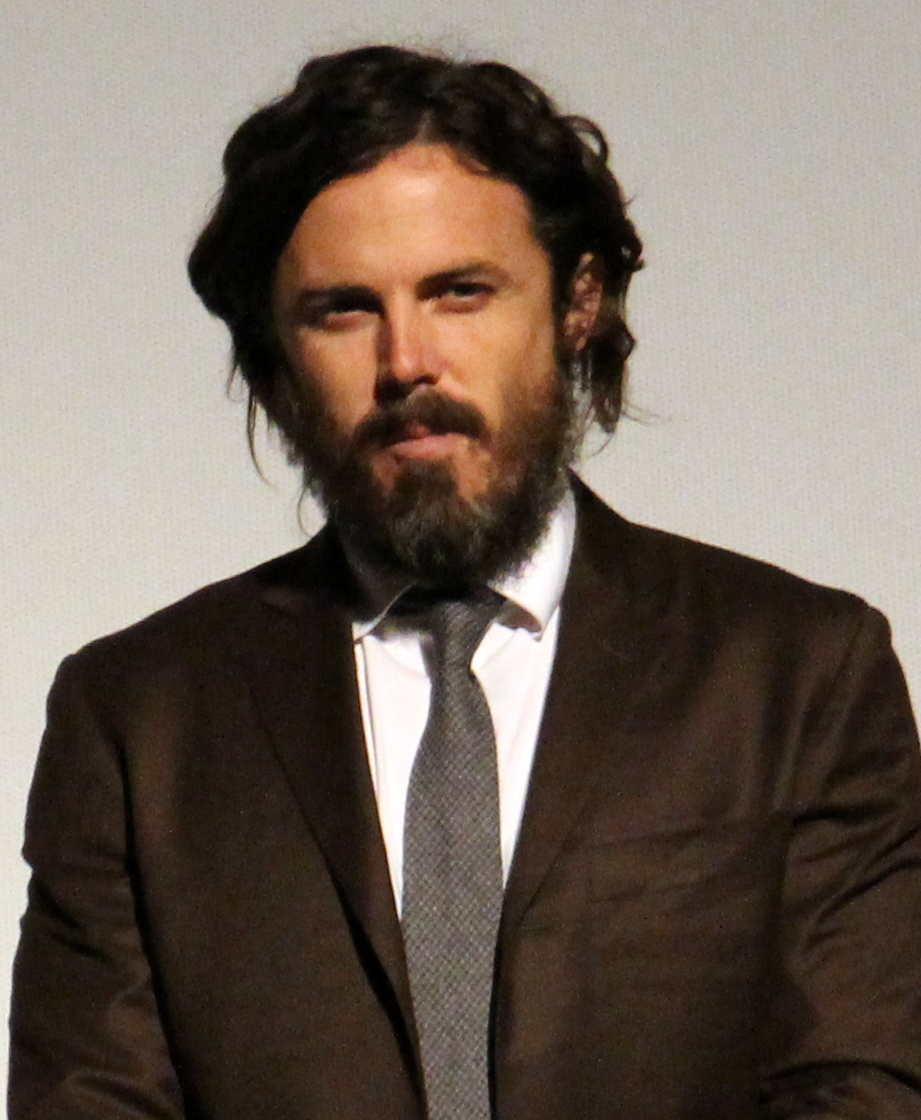
Casey Affleck, Best Actor winner

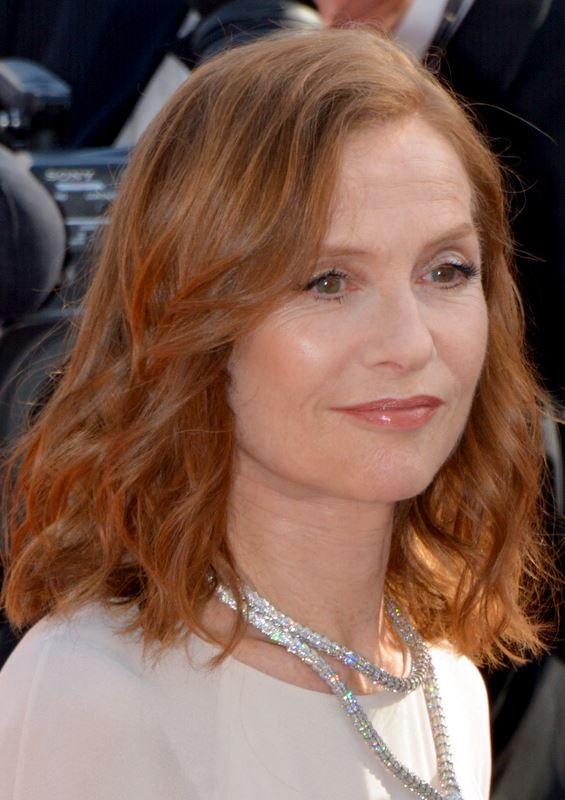
Isabelle Huppert, Best Actress winner

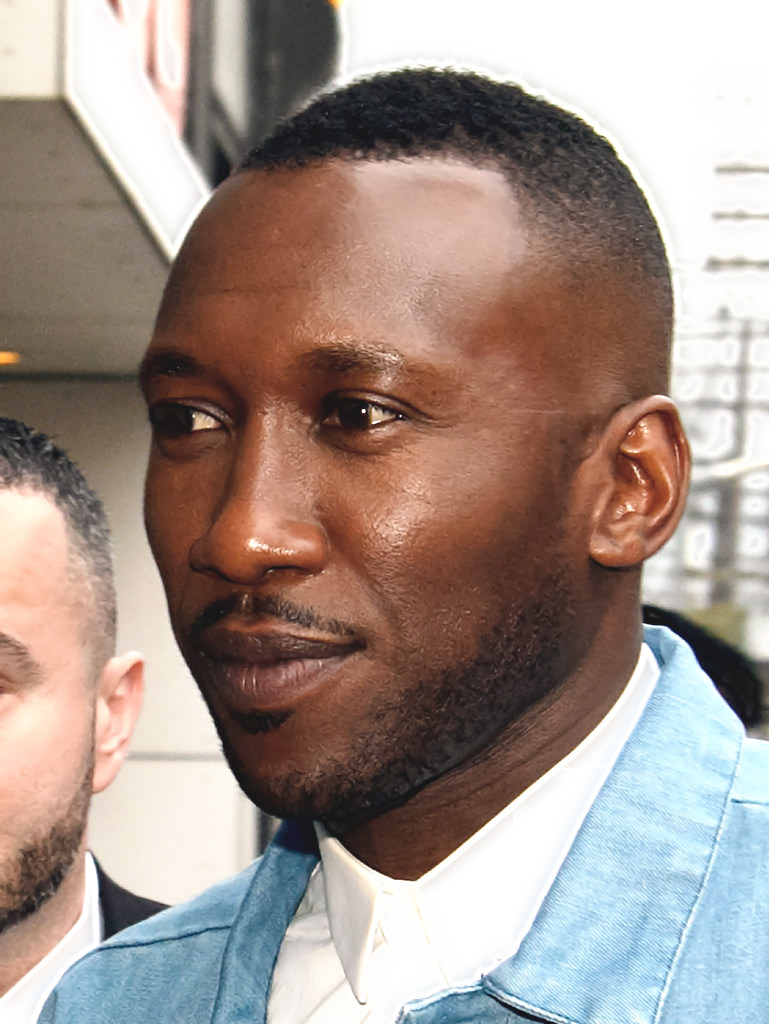
Mahershala Ali, Best Supporting Actor winner

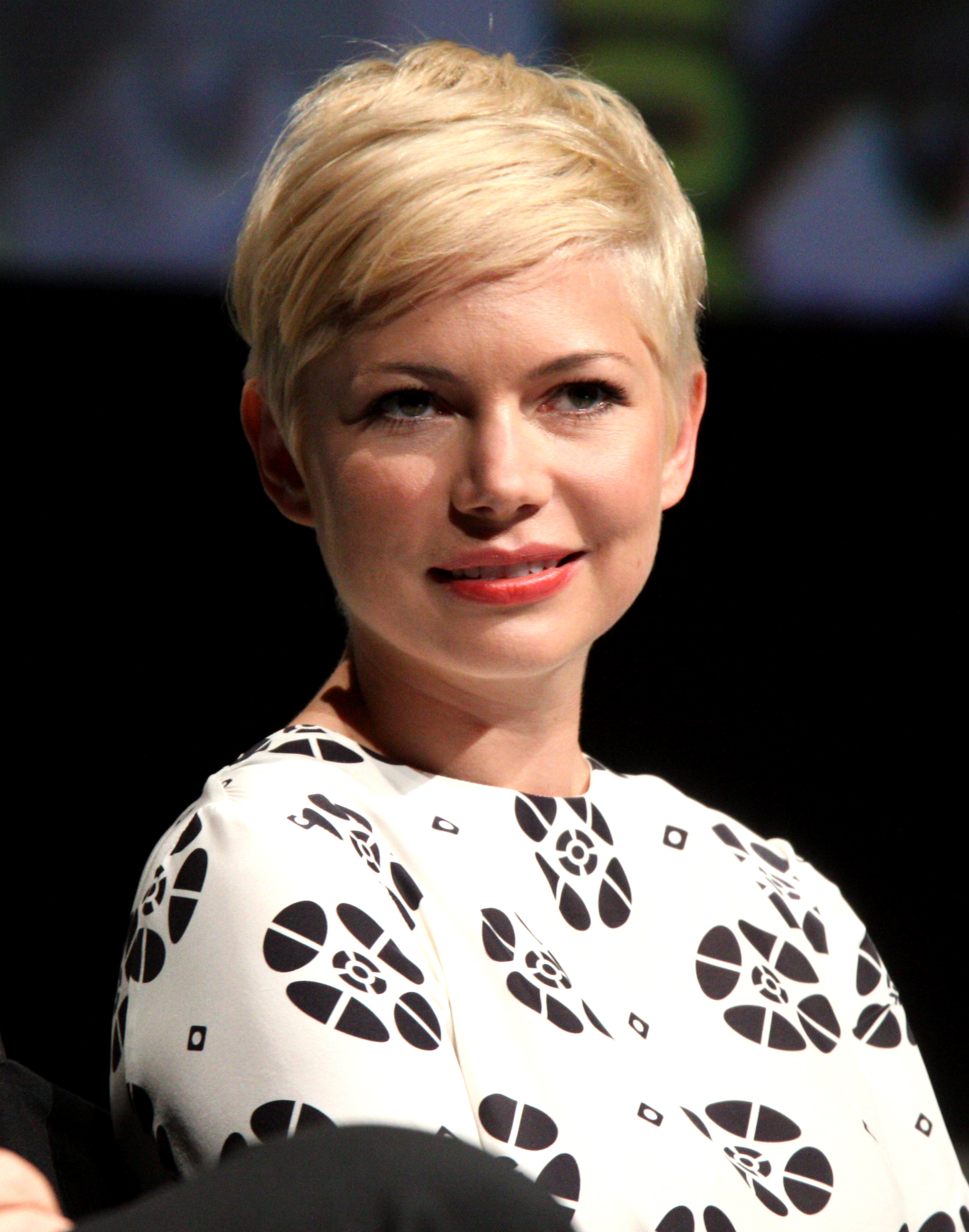
Michelle Williams, Best Supporting Actress winner

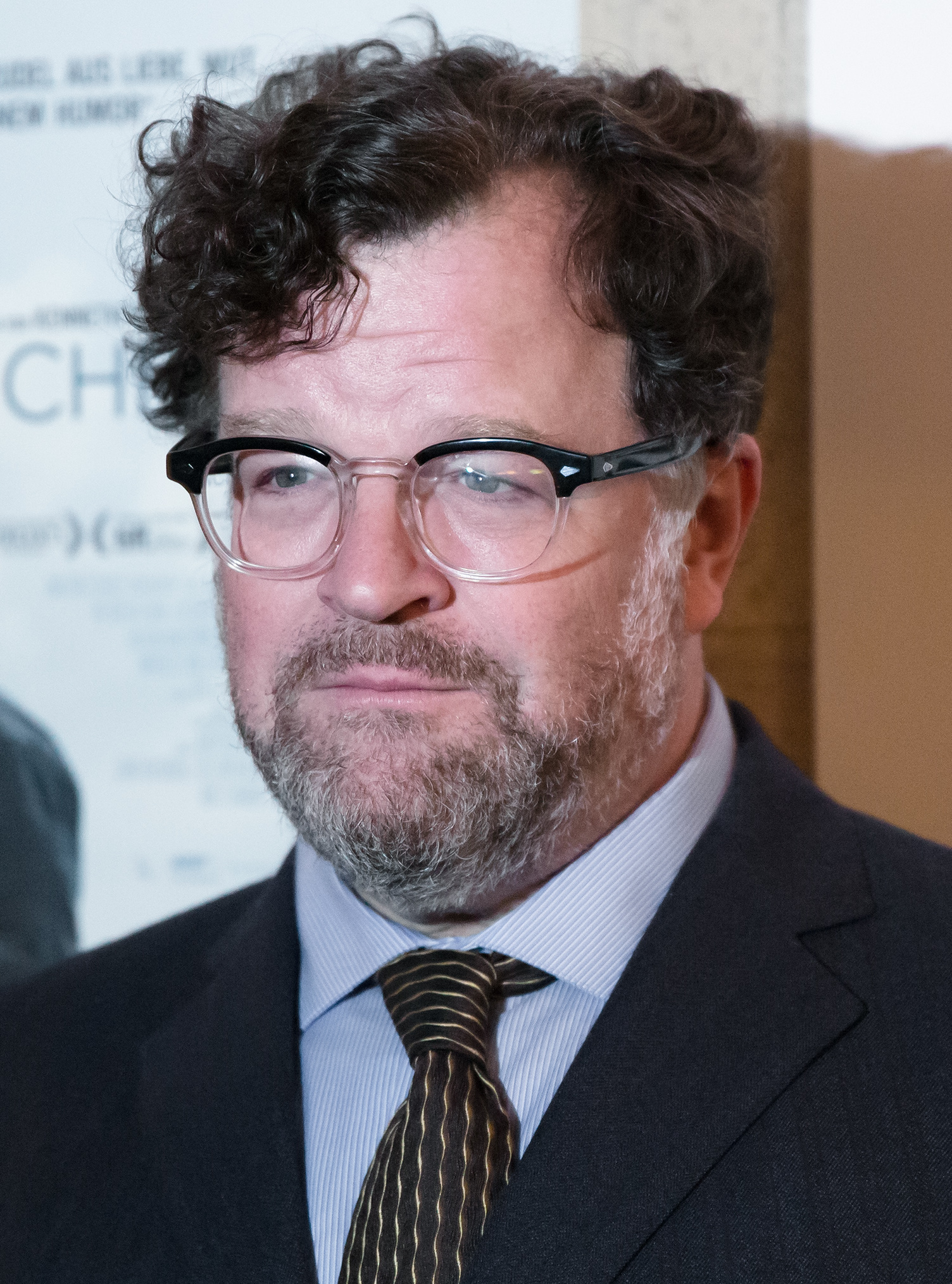
Kenneth Lonergan, Best Screenplay winner

=== Best Picture ===
1. **Moonlight** (54)
2. Manchester by the Sea (39)
3. La La Land (31)

=== Best Director ===
1. **Barry Jenkins – Moonlight** (53)
2. Damien Chazelle – La La Land (37)
3. Kenneth Lonergan – Manchester by the Sea (23)

=== Best Actor ===
1. **Casey Affleck – Manchester by the Sea** (65)
2. Denzel Washington – Fences (21)
3. Adam Driver – Paterson (20)

=== Best Actress ===
1. **Isabelle Huppert – Elle and Things to Come** (55)
2. Annette Bening – 20th Century Women (26)
3. Sandra Hüller – Toni Erdmann (26)

=== Best Supporting Actor ===
1. **Mahershala Ali – Moonlight** (72)
2. Jeff Bridges – Hell or High Water (18)
3. Michael Shannon – Nocturnal Animals (14)

=== Best Supporting Actress ===
1. **Michelle Williams – Manchester by the Sea** (58)
2. Lily Gladstone – Certain Women (45)
3. Naomie Harris – Moonlight (25)

=== Best Screenplay ===
1. **Kenneth Lonergan – Manchester by the Sea** (61)
2. Barry Jenkins – Moonlight (39)
3. Taylor Sheridan – Hell or High Water (16)

=== Best Cinematography ===
1. **James Laxton – Moonlight** (52)
2. Linus Sandgren – La La Land (27)
3. Rodrigo Prieto – Silence (23)

=== Best Foreign Language Film ===
1. **Toni Erdmann – Maren Ade** (52)
2. The Handmaiden – Park Chan-wook (26)
3. Elle – Paul Verhoeven (19)
4. Things to Come – Mia Hansen-Løve (19)

=== Best Non-Fiction Film ===
1. **O.J.: Made in America – Ezra Edelman** (64)
2. I Am Not Your Negro – Raoul Peck (36)
3. 13th – Ava DuVernay (20)

=== Film Heritage Award ===
- Kino Lorber's 5-disc collection of Pioneers of African-American Cinema

=== Special Citation ===
- Cristi Puiu's Sieranevada, a film awaiting American distribution
