= Tout est pardonné (disambiguation) =

Tout est pardonné could refer to:

- All Is Forgiven (film): A 2007 French film
- The phrase on the cover of the Survivors' issue of Charlie Hebdo after the Charlie Hebdo shooting.
