= Iris in Bloom =

- Film poster
- French: En ville
- Directed by: Valérie Mréjen; Bertrand Schefer
- Written by: Valérie Mréjen; Bertrand Schefer
- Produced by: Charlotte Vincent
- Starring: Lola Créton; Stanislas Merhar
- Cinematography: Claire Mathon
- Edited by: Thomas Marchand
- Music by: Jean-Claude Vannier
- Production companies: Aurora Films; Le Fresnoy – Studio National des Arts Contemporains
- Distributed by: Shellac Distribution
- Release dates: 15 May 2011 (Cannes); 27 July 2011 (France)
- Running time: 75 minutes
- Country: France
- Language: French

Iris in Bloom (French: En ville; lit. 'In the city') is a 2011 French romantic drama film directed and written by Valérie Mréjen and Bertrand Schefer in their directorial debut. It was screened in the Directors' Fortnight section at the 2011 Cannes Film Festival.

== Cast ==
- Lola Créton as Iris
- Stanislas Merhar as Jean
- Adèle Haenel as Isabelle
- Valérie Donzelli as Monika
- Ferdinand Régent as Alexandre
- Barthélemy Guillemard as the confident
- Antoine Chappey as the man in the bar
- Marilyne Canto as Alexandre's mother
- Serge Renko as Iris' father
- Frédéric Pierrot Alexandre's father
- Pascal Cervo as the passing friend
- Michèle Moretti as Jean's mother
- Stéphane Bouquet as the teacher
- Gaëlle Obiégly as a guest
- Thomas Clerc as a guest
- Christophe Wavelet as a dandy
- Françoise Cousin as a woman in the bar
- Katia Beaudufe as the ticket controller
- Bertrand Schefer as Jérémie
- Gilles Geenen as Gérald
- Elisa Hildebrandt as Alessa, the German girl
