= Denis Lenoir =

French cinematographer

- Born: February 1949 (age 76); Paris, France
- Occupation: Cinematographer
- Years active: 1972–present
- Title: AFC; ASC
- Awards: American Society of Cinematographers; Uprising, 2001; Camerimage; Demonlover (2002); Amiens International Film Festival; Golden Unicorn for Career Achievement, 2013

Denis Lenoir (born 1949) is a French cinematographer, whose credits include Uprising, The Clearing, and Thursday.

He started as second assistant operator for L'insolent (1973).

== Selected filmography ==
- Sotelo (1976, short/Raoul Ruiz)
- Dog's Dialogue (1976, short)
- Laissé inachevé à Tokyo (1982, short/Olivier Assayas)
- Les veufs (1983, short/Patrick Dewolf)
- Winston Tong en studio (1984, short/Assayas)
- L'amour propre ne le reste jamais très longtemps (1985/Martin Veyron)
- Beau fixe (1992)
- Carrington (1995)
- An Air So Pure (1997)
- Demonlover (2002)
- Boomtown (2002)
- The Clearing (2004)
- Control (2004)
- Entre ses mains (2005)
- Time Bomb (2006)
- Paris, je t'aime (2006) (segment "14th arrondissement")
- 88 Minutes (2007)
- Angel (2007)
- Righteous Kill (2008)
- The Vintner's Luck (2009)
- Carlos (2010)
- The Sleeping Beauty (2010)
- Tous les soleils (2011)
- So Undercover (2012)
- The Ultimate Accessory (2013)
- Before the Winter Chill (2013)
- Eden (2014)
- Still Alice (2014)
- Une Enfance (2015)
- Things to Come (2016)
- Three Christs (2017)
- Wasp Network (2019)
- Bergman Island (2021)
- One Fine Morning (2022)
- The Last Rodeo (2025)
- The Steel Harp (TBA)
