= Maya (2018 film) =

Film by Mia Hansen-Løve

- Theatrical release poster
- Directed by: Mia Hansen-Løve
- Written by: Mia Hansen-Løve
- Produced by: Charlotte Dauphin; Philippe Martin; David Thion
- Starring: Roman Kolinka; Aarshi Banerjee; Alex Descas; Judith Chemla; Johanna ter Steege; Pathy Aiyar; Suzan Anbeh
- Cinematography: Hélène Louvart
- Edited by: Marion Monnier
- Production companies: Les Films Pelléas; Razor Film Produktion; Arte France Cinéma; ZDF/Arte; Orange Studio; Sofinergie 5 FCM; Dauphin Films; Pio & Co
- Distributed by: Les Films du Losange (France); Weltkino Filmverleih (Germany)
- Release dates: 10 September 2018 (TIFF); 19 December 2018 (France); 11 November 2021 (Germany)
- Running time: 107 minutes
- Countries: France; Germany
- Languages: French; English

Maya is a 2018 romantic drama film written and directed by Mia Hansen-Løve. It had its world premiere in the Special Presentations section of the 2018 Toronto International Film Festival. The film was released in France on 19 December 2018 by Les Films du Losange and in Germany on 11 November 2021 by Weltkino Filmverleih.

== Cast ==
- Roman Kolinka as Gabriel Dahan
- Aarshi Banerjee as Maya
- Suzan Anbeh as Sigrid
- Judith Chemla as Naomi
- Alex Descas as Frédéric
- Johanna ter Steege as Johanna
- Pathy Aiyar as Monty
