= Daguerrotype (film) =

2016 film

- Japanese poster
- Directed by: Kiyoshi Kurosawa
- Written by: Kiyoshi Kurosawa
- Starring: Tahar Rahim; Constance Rousseau; Olivier Gourmet; Mathieu Amalric; Malik Zidi
- Cinematography: Alexis Kavyrchine
- Edited by: Veronique Lange
- Music by: Gregoire Hetzel
- Release dates: 11 September 2016 (TIFF); 15 October 2016 (Japan); 8 March 2017 (France)
- Running time: 131 minutes
- Countries: France; Japan; Belgium
- Language: French

Daguerrotype (also known as The Woman in the Silver Plate; Japanese: ダゲレオタイプの女; French: Le Secret de la chambre noire or La Femme de la plaque argentique) is a 2016 French-Japanese romantic horror film written and directed by Kiyoshi Kurosawa. It stars Tahar Rahim, Constance Rousseau, Olivier Gourmet, Mathieu Amalric, and Malik Zidi.

== Plot ==
Stéphane, a renowned fashion photographer, lives in seclusion in a dilapidated house in the Paris suburbs, together with his daughter and muse Marie. Stéphane is obsessed with his wife's unexpected death and creates her daguerreotypes every day, using his daughter as a photography model. In order for him to do so, Marie has to remain immobile for a long time, wearing an old-fashioned blue dress.

Jean, a young Parisian and the new assistant of Stéphane, falls in love with Marie. He is disturbed by the long photo sessions and, together with Marie, tries to figure out how to free Stéphane from his obsession. Jean decides to convince Stéphane to sell his real estate. The money received for the sale may be used to start a life elsewhere—both for Jean who wants to live with Marie and for the photographer who can recreate his photography studio. But things do not go as planned.

== Cast ==
- Tahar Rahim as Jean
- Constance Rousseau as Marie
- Olivier Gourmet as Stephane
- Mathieu Amalric as Vincent
- Malik Zidi as Thomas
- Valerie Sibilia as Denise
- Jacques Collard as Louis

== Release ==
The film had its world premiere in the Platform section at the 2016 Toronto International Film Festival on 11 September 2016. It was released in Japan on 15 October 2016, and in France on 8 March 2017. It also screened at the 21st Busan International Film Festival, the 29th Tokyo International Film Festival, the 2017 Nippon Connection, and the 2017 Japan Cuts.

== Reception ==
On review aggregator website Rotten Tomatoes, the film holds an approval rating of 46% based on 13 reviews, and an average rating of 5.88/10.

Boyd van Hoeij of The Hollywood Reporter gave the film a favorable review, saying, "A double-take scene in an empty church is an especially strong moment because of Rahim's (and Kurosawa's) tacit understanding of understatement." Meanwhile, Sam Fragoso of TheWrap gave the film an unfavorable review, describing it as "two or three movies haphazardly wrapped into one." Andrew Barker of Variety called it "Heavy on moody atmospherics yet fundamentally inert." Keith Uhlich of Slant Magazine stated that it is reminiscent of William Dieterle's 1948 romantic fantasy film, Portrait of Jennie.
