= Mia Hansen-Løve =

French filmmaker (born 1981)

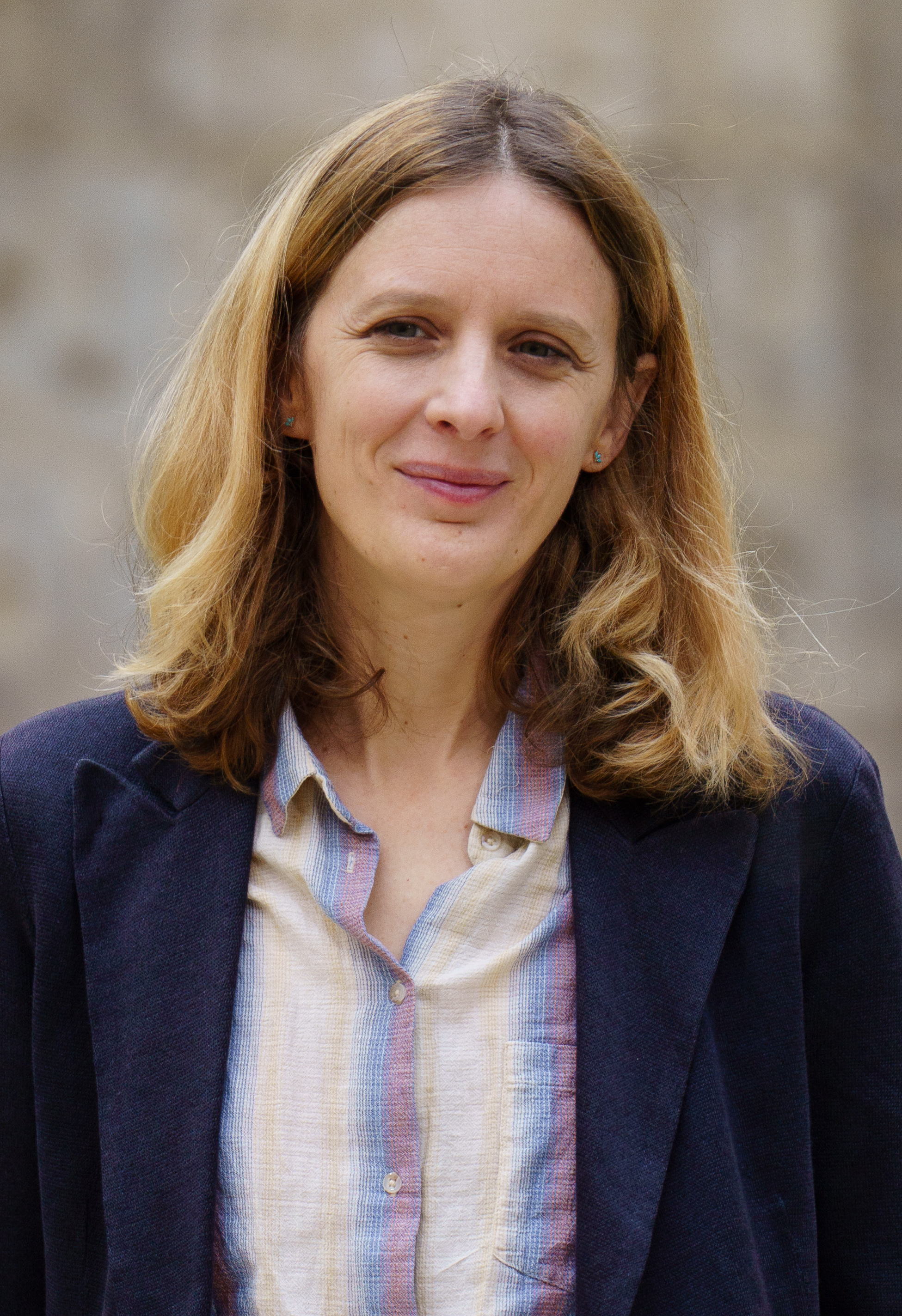
- Hansen-Løve in 2025
- Born: 5 February 1981 (age 45); Paris, France
- Occupations: Film director; screenwriter; actress
- Years active: 1998–present
- Partners: Olivier Assayas (2002–2017); Laurent Perreau
- Children: 2

Mia Hansen-Løve (born 5 February 1981) is a French filmmaker and former actress. Most known for her films Eden (2014), Bergman Island (2021), and One Fine Morning (2022).

Her first feature film, All Is Forgiven (2007), won the prestigious Louis Delluc Prize for Best First Film. Father of My Children (2009) won the Un Certain Regard Special Jury Prize at the 62nd Cannes Film Festival. For Things to Come (2016), she won the Silver Bear for Best Director at the 66th Berlin International Film Festival.

In 2014, Hansen-Løve was awarded the status of Chevalier in the Ordre des Arts et des Lettres. In 2016, she became a member of the Academy of Motion Picture Arts and Sciences.

== Early life ==
Hansen-Løve was born on 5 February 1981 in Paris. Her parents, Laurence and Ole Hansen-Løve, are both philosophy professors who separated when Hansen-Løve was in her 20s. She inherited her double-barrelled Danish family name from her paternal grandfather, who had immigrated to France from Denmark.

At university, Hansen-Løve studied German and minored in philosophy.

As a teenager, Hansen-Løve enjoyed acting and appeared in Late August, Early September and Sentimental Destinies, both directed by Olivier Assayas. In 2001, she began studying at the Conservatory of Dramatic Arts in Paris, but left in 2003 and began writing reviews for French film magazine Cahiers du cinéma until 2005, a job that fueled her desire to make films. "What I wanted [as a Cahiers critic] was to build little-by-little a cinematic train of thought," she has said. Hansen-Løve says she is not nostalgic about her time at Cahiers du cinéma, however useful it was, and that she experienced misogyny there. Meanwhile, she directed several shorts, including Contre-coup (2005), starring Louis Garrel and Lolita Chammah.

In 2016, Hansen-Løve said, "When I was in my 20s, I was completely lost in life. Realizing I wanted to make films gave me strength. Because filmmaking is a perpetual questioning of existence: What is beauty? Why am I living? And I need that, I think, perhaps because of being the daughter of two philosophy teachers."

== Career ==
Hansen-Løve's debut film, All Is Forgiven, was nominated for a César Award for Best First Feature Film in 2008 by the French Film Academy.

Her second film, Father of My Children, premiered at the 2009 Cannes Film Festival in the Un Certain Regard section, winning the Special Jury Prize. The film was inspired by the suicide of Humbert Balsan, a French actor and film producer who served as an early mentor for Hansen-Løve.

Her third feature was the semi-autobiographical Goodbye First Love. Hansen-Løve cast Lola Créton after seeing her in Bluebeard. Her then-partner, Olivier Assayas, who was with her at the time of the viewing, subsequently cast Créton in one of his films. The film premiered at the 2011 Locarno International Film Festival, where it received a special mention from the Jury.

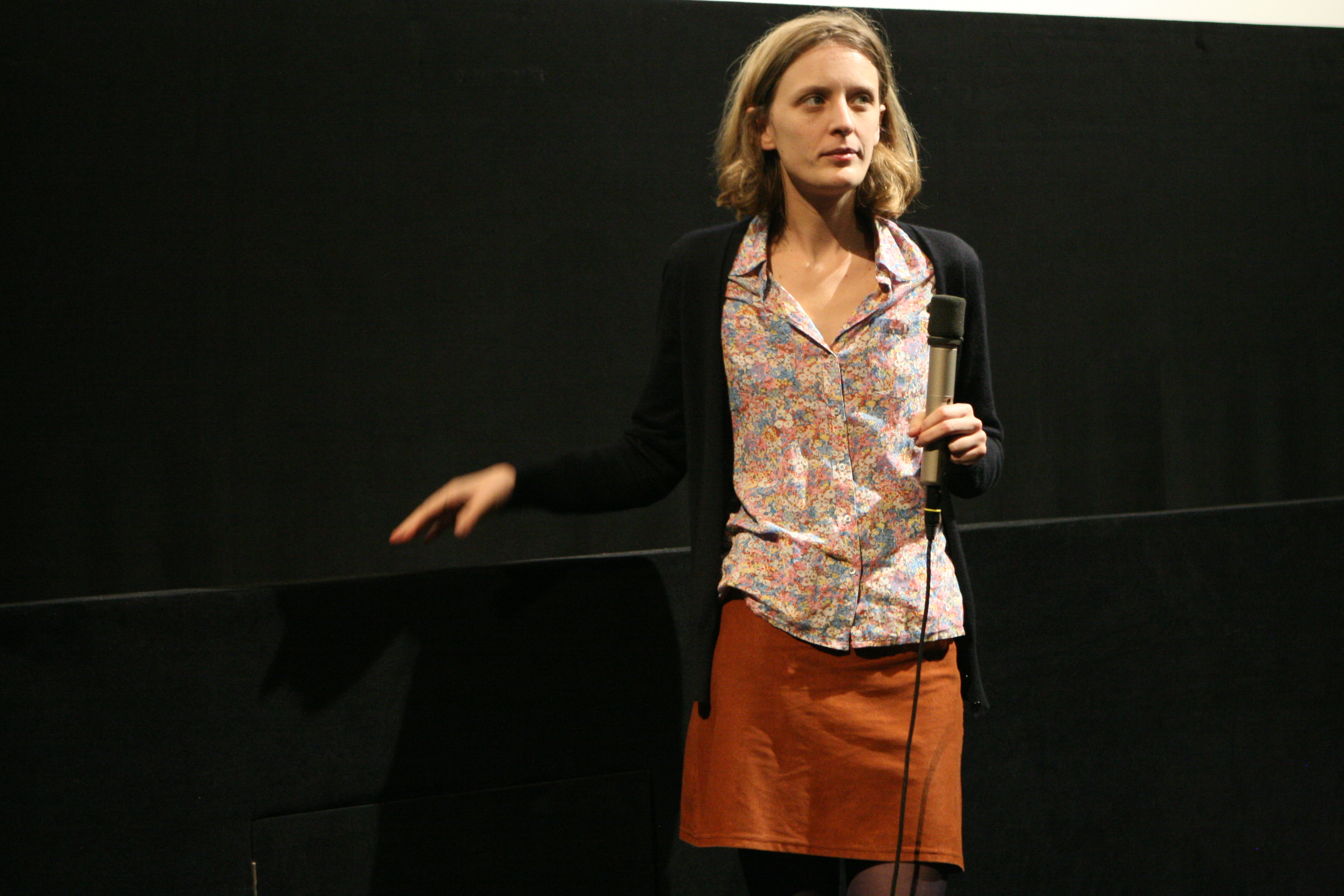
Hansen-Løve in 2012

In August 2012, TIFF Cinemathique presented a retrospective of Hansen-Løve's work titled "Fathers and Daughters: The Films of Mia Hansen-Løve."

In November 2013, Hansen-Løve began filming Eden, an autobiographical drama about a young man who discovers the burgeoning French house music scene during the early 90s. The film was inspired and co-written by her brother Sven, who had been part of the 90s club scene as a DJ. Hansen-Løve went through multiple producers while trying to make the film, as obtaining the rights to the music she wanted to use was time-consuming and expensive. The film premiered at the 2014 Toronto International Film Festival.

During promotion for Eden, Hansen-Løve announced that her next film, Things to Come (L'Avenir), would star Isabelle Huppert as a philosophy teacher whose seemingly perfect life begins to fall apart when her husband leaves her and her children move away from home. Hansen-Løve cited Eric Rohmer's The Green Ray as the "one film [she] couldn't help thinking of when writing Things to Come" because of the similarities between the film's themes and their central female characters. The film was completed in 2016 and premiered in competition at the 66th Berlin International Film Festival, where Hansen-Løve won the Silver Bear for Best Director.

In September 2018, Hansen-Løve premiered Maya at the 2018 Toronto International Film Festival as a part of the Special Presentations section.

In May 2017, it was announced that Hansen-Løve would be making her English-language debut with Bergman Island. Set on the Swedish island of Fårö, the film illustrates a filmmaking couple who retreat to the island that inspired director Ingmar Bergman, residing there for the summer to each write screenplays for their upcoming films. The film was set to star Greta Gerwig, Mia Wasikowska, Anders Danielsen Lie and John Turturro, but in August 2018 it was announced that Vicky Krieps would replace Gerwig and Turturro would no longer star in the film. Production began in August 2018 and Tim Roth was later cast in the lead role. Bergman Island premiered at Cannes in 2021, having been postponed from the cancelled 2020 edition of the festival.

In 2023, Hansen-Løve served on the jury of the 80th Venice International Film Festival, chaired by Damien Chazelle.

=== Style and themes ===
Hansen-Løve is also a screenwriter, having written the screenplays for all of her films. "I write all films by myself", she has said. "I really try to close a door and go inside myself to search for my own truth. It would be a limitation to stick to those cineastes that I look up to. What I admire in them is precisely their sense of independence, how they created their own language and how they plunged into themselves to make their own films."

Hansen-Løve's films mostly revolve around familial and romantic relationships and their effects. Eden, Father of My Children, and Things to Come all draw on important people or events in Hansen-Løve's life, though she has said that while all her films are personal, they are not autobiographical. Time Out writer Dave Calhoun describes Hansen-Løve's films as "intimate, realist, free of melodrama. They have a lightness of touch and yet feel wise." Hansen-Løve's brother, Sven, has said that she "prides herself on trueness and realism and authenticity." Eschewing shocking or dramatic events, Hansen-Løve rests her narratives on subtle emotional shifts; climactic moments occur naturally, with no prior indication.

Common themes in Hansen-Løve's films are personal crisis, desire, and existentialism. Her films also tend to touch upon the generational effects of France's political and social history. Hansen-Løve's films have been compared to those of French auteur Eric Rohmer, whose work influenced her.

Hansen-Løve has said that All Is Forgiven, Father of My Children, and Goodbye First Love are a loose trilogy about the transformations involved in transitioning to adulthood. "It's not accidental that the daughters are all 15, 16, or 17 for the majority of each film," she said. "It's not only about the relationship between fathers and daughters, it's about that particular age where you separate from your family and become an adult."

== Personal life ==
Hansen-Løve was in a relationship with director Olivier Assayas, who directed her in the films Late August, Early September and Sentimental Destinies, from 2002 to 2017. Though it was widely assumed they were married, Hansen-Løve revealed after they split that they never had been. They have a daughter, Vicky, born in 2009. Hansen-Løve had a second child, a son with filmmaker Laurent Perreau, in 2020.

Hansen-Løve is the younger sister of Sven Hansen-Løve, a successful DJ in the 90s and the inspiration for and co-writer of Eden.

Her cousin, Igor Hansen-Løve, is a L'Express journalist. He had a small role in her 2009 film Father of My Children.

== Filmography ==
=== Feature films ===
| Year | English Title | Original Title | Notes |
|---|---|---|---|
| 2007 | All Is Forgiven | Tout est pardonné | Louis Delluc Prize for Best First Film; Nominated – Caméra d'Or (2007 Cannes Film Festival); Nominated – César Award for Best First Feature Film |
| 2009 | Father of My Children | Le Père de mes enfants | Un Certain Regard - Special Jury Prize (2009 Cannes Film Festival); Lumière Award for Best Screenplay; Nominated – Un Certain Regard |
| 2011 | Goodbye First Love | Un amour de jeunesse | Locarno International Film Festival - Special Mention; Nominated – Golden Leopard |
| 2014 | Eden | | Nominated – Golden Shell (San Sebastián International Film Festival) |
| 2016 | Things to Come | L'Avenir | Silver Bear for Best Director; Nominated – Golden Bear; Nominated – Louis Delluc Prize |
| 2018 | Maya | | |
| 2021 | Bergman Island | | Nominated – Palme d'Or |
| 2022 | One Fine Morning | Un beau matin | |
| TBA | If Love Should Die | | Pre-production |

=== Short films ===
| Year | Title |
|---|---|
| 2003 | Après mûre réflexion |
| 2004 | Un pur esprit |
| 2005 | Offre Spéciale |
| 2005 | Contre-coup |
| 2005 | Laisse passer l'été |
| 2005 | Platonov, la nuit est belle |

=== Acting credits ===
| Year | Title | Role |
|---|---|---|
| 1998 | Late August, Early September | Véra |
| 2000 | Sentimental Destinies | Aline |
