= Late August, Early September =

1998 film

- Theatrical release poster
- Directed by: Olivier Assayas
- Written by: Olivier Assayas
- Produced by: Georges Benayoun; Philippe Carcassonne; Françoise Guglielmi
- Starring: Mathieu Amalric
- Cinematography: Denis Lenoir
- Edited by: Luc Barnier
- Distributed by: PolyGram Film Distribution
- Release date: 14 September 1998
- Running time: 112 minutes
- Country: France
- Language: French
- Budget: $2.6 million
- Box office: $1.5 million

Late August, Early September (French: Fin août, début septembre) is a 1998 French drama film directed by Olivier Assayas and starring Mathieu Amalric.

== Plot ==
Adrien (François Cluzet), a tough-loving writer who has had only marginal commercial success, discovers that he is dying and tells his friend Gabriel (Mathieu Amalric), with whom he has had a tumultuous relationship. Gabriel tries to attend to Adrien while making sense of his complicated romantic life, torn between his former girlfriend, dependable Jenny (Jeanne Balibar), and a new lover, mercurial Anne (Virginie Ledoyen). Unlike Adrien, Gabriel is not a risk-taker: his career path as an encyclopedia editor is steady and secure. Adrien attempts to write his greatest book and begins a quiet relationship with a curious student, Véra (Mia Hansen-Løve). The ensemble and Adrien's other friends find it difficult to assess their lives and careers in the wake of Adrien's revelation, but find that compassion for one another (compassion etymologically meaning "com" as in "all" or "together" combined with "passion") may actually be the sweetest pleasure. By the end of the film, each living character receives various materials (an artwork, an apartment, a memory, a story), from Adrien's life so that Adrien never really leaves the picture all the while giving his compains room to finally move onwards with their own stories.

== Cast ==
- Mathieu Amalric as Gabriel
- Virginie Ledoyen as Anne
- François Cluzet as Adrien
- Jeanne Balibar as Jenny
- Alex Descas as Jérémie
- Arsinée Khanjian as Lucie
- Mia Hansen-Løve as Véra
- Nathalie Richard as Maryelle
- Éric Elmosnino as Thomas
- Olivier Cruveiller as Axel
- Jean-Baptiste Malartre as the publisher
- André Marcon as Hattou
- Elisabeth Mazev as the woman who visits the apartment
- Olivier Py as the man who visits the apartment
- Jean-Baptiste Montagut as Joseph Costa
