= Serge Renko =

French actor

Serge Renko is a French actor. He appeared in more than thirty films since 1982.

== Selected filmography ==
Year	Title	Role	Notes
1995	Les Rendez-vous de Paris		
2004	Triple Agent		
2011	Iris in Bloom		
2011	Goodbye First Love		
2012	Farewell, My Queen		
