= David Thion =

French film producer

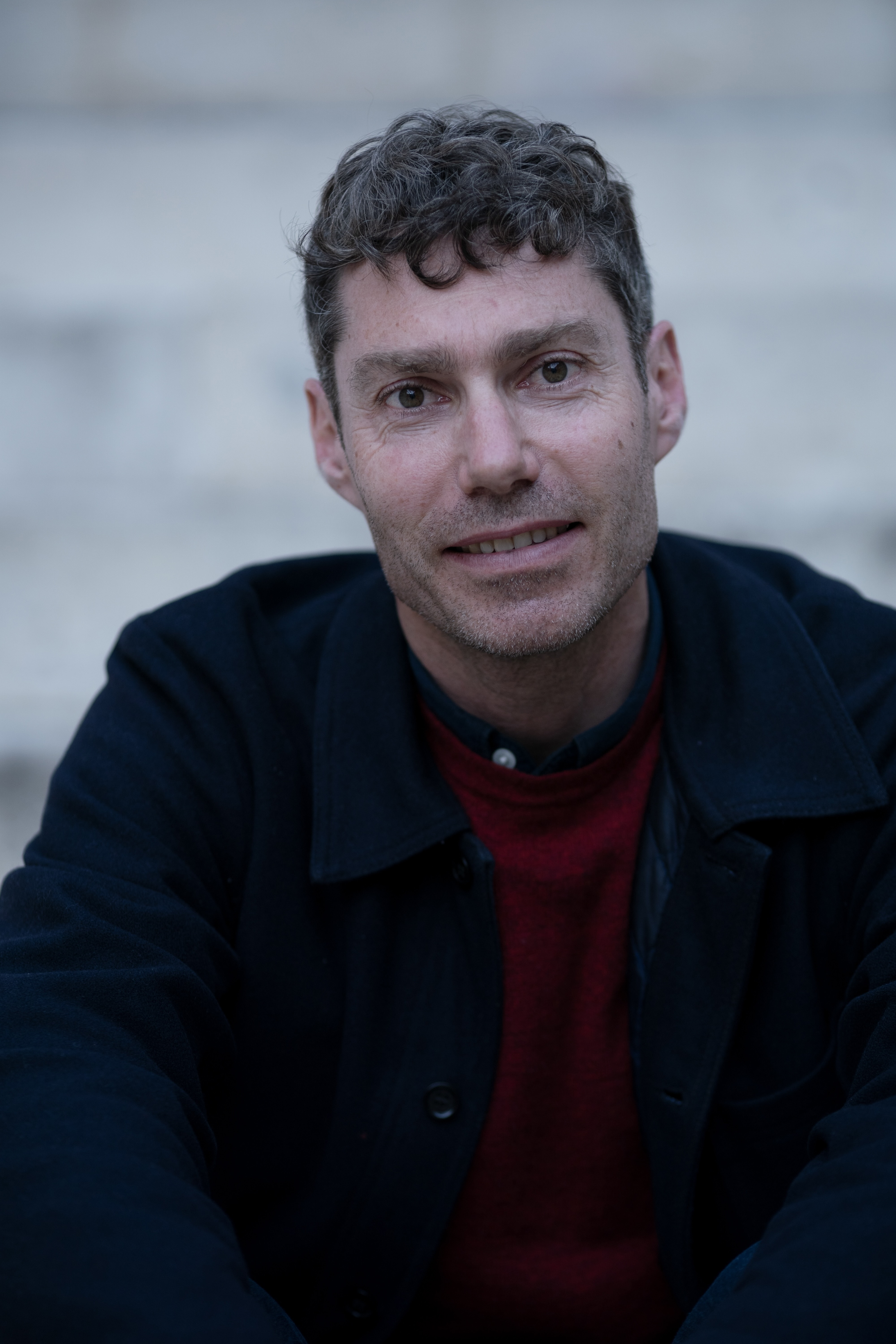
- Born: 9 July 1971 (age 55); Orléans, France
- Education: Emlyon Business School; La Fémis
- Occupations: Film producer; Executive producer
- Years active: 2000–present
- Awards: César Award for Best Film (2024, Anatomy of a Fall)

David Thion is a French film producer. He was nominated for two British Academy Film Awards in the categories Best Film and Best Film Not in the English Language and the Academy Award for Best Picture for the film Anatomy of a Fall.

== Selected filmography ==
- All Is Forgiven (2007)
- Father of My Children (2009)
- Goodbye First Love (2011)
- Parisienne (2015)
- Dark Inclusion (2016)
- Sophie's Misfortunes (2016)
- Heal the Living (2016)
- Until the Birds Return (2017)
- Sorry Angel (2018)
- Our Struggles (2018)
- The Trouble with You (2018)
- Maya (2018)
- On a Magical Night (2019)
- Sibyl (2019)
- Lovers (2020)
- Simple Passion (2020)
- Anaïs in Love (2021)
- One Fine Morning (2022)
- Winter Boy (2022)
- Along Came Love (2023)
- Anatomy of a Fall (2023)
- My Everything (2024)
- A Woman's Life (2026)

== Awards and nominations ==
Award	Year	Category	Film	Result	Ref.
Academy Awards	2024	Best Picture	Anatomy of a Fall	Nominated	
British Academy Film Awards	2024	Best Film	Anatomy of a Fall	Nominated	
British Academy Film Awards	2024	Best Film Not in the English Language	Anatomy of a Fall	Nominated	
British Independent Film Awards	2023	Best International Independent Film	Anatomy of a Fall	Won	
César Awards	2017	Best First Feature Film	Dark Inclusion	Nominated	
César Awards	2019	Best Film	The Trouble with You	Nominated	
César Awards	2019	Best Foreign Film	Our Struggles	Nominated	
César Awards	2022	Best Documentary Film	Gallant Indies	Nominated	
César Awards	2023	Best Documentary Film	The Super 8 Years	Nominated	
César Awards	2024	Best Film	Anatomy of a Fall	Won	
European Film Awards	2023	European Film	Anatomy of a Fall	Won	
Gotham Awards	2023	Best International Feature	Anatomy of a Fall	Won	
Producers Guild of America Awards	2024	Darryl F. Zanuck Award for Outstanding Producer of Theatrical Motion Pictures	Anatomy of a Fall	Nominated	
