= Lola Créton =

French actress (born 1993)

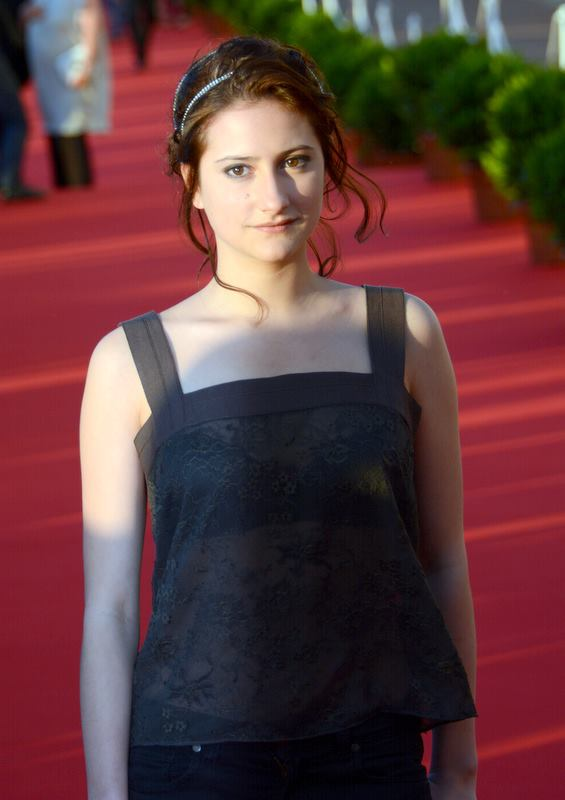
- Lola Créton in 2013
- Born: 16 December 1993 (age 32); Paris, France
- Occupation: Actress
- Years active: 2004–present

Lola Créton (born 16 December 1993) is a French actress. Créton began her career at the age of 10, appearing in the short film Imago (2004). She is known for her lead roles in the films Goodbye First Love (2011) and Something in the Air (2012).

== Filmography ==
Year	Title	Role	Notes
2004	Imago		Short film
2007	Louis Page		TV series
2007	Room of Death	Eléonore	
2008	Les Enfants de Timpelbach	Mireille Stettner	
2009	Bluebeard	Marie-Catherine	
2009	Malban		Short film
2011	Iris in Bloom	Iris	
2011	Goodbye First Love	Camille	
2012	Something in the Air	Christine	
2012	Hollyoaks Later	Lola	TV series
2013	Bastards	Justine	
2014	Disparue en hiver	Laura	
2016	Corniche Kennedy	Suzanne	
