= Eden (2014 film) =

2014 film

- Theatrical release poster
- Directed by: Mia Hansen-Løve
- Written by: Mia Hansen-Løve; Sven Hansen-Løve
- Produced by: Charles Gillibert
- Starring: Félix de Givry; Pauline Etienne; Hugo Conzelmann; Roman Kolinka; Vincent Macaigne; Greta Gerwig; Laura Smet; Golshifteh Farahani; Vincent Lacoste; Arnaud Azoulay; Zita Hanrot; Paul Spera; Ugo Bienvenu; Laurent Cazanave; Sigrid Bouaziz; Léa Rougeron; Olivia Ross; Pierre-François Garel; David Blot; François Buot; Ludovic Bergery; Clara 3000; Tony Humphries; La India; Arnold Jarvis; Terry Hunter; Arsinée Khanjian; Brady Corbet
- Cinematography: Denis Lenoir
- Edited by: Marion Monnier
- Music by: Daft Punk; Joe Smooth; Frankie Knuckles; Terry Hunter
- Production companies: CG Cinéma; Canal+; OCS
- Distributed by: Ad Vitam Distribution
- Release dates: 5 September 2014 (TIFF); 19 November 2014 (France)
- Running time: 131 minutes
- Country: France
- Languages: French; English
- Budget: $5.2 million
- Box office: $507,914

Eden is a 2014 French drama film directed by Mia Hansen-Løve and co-written with Sven Hansen-Løve. The film stars Félix de Givry and Pauline Etienne. The film premiered in the Special Presentations section of the 2014 Toronto International Film Festival. It was also screened in the 52nd edition of the New York Film Festival and the BFI London Film Festival. The film's U.S. theatrical release was 19 June 2015. It was the first film to be released by Broad Green Pictures.

== Plot ==
Paul Vallée, a young French student, enjoys going to raves. He eventually partners with his friend Stan to form a DJ duo called Cheers around the same time as two of his other friends Guy-Man and Thomas form the DJ duo Daft Punk. He is hoping to become a writer, but he gradually abandons his thesis as his DJing career takes off. In 2001, he and his friend Cyril are invited to New York to DJ at MoMA PS1, but Cyril refuses to go, having finally decided to commit to the graphic novel he had wanted to write. Paul's time in New York is a success, but upon his return he learns that Cyril committed suicide shortly after completing the work.

For a while, Paul is a successful DJ, but by 2006 his spending begins to catch up with him as his audience shrinks. He turns to his mother to keep him financially afloat. As his life begins to crumble, he runs into an old girlfriend, Louise. He hopes they can reconnect romantically, but she informs him that she had had an abortion after becoming pregnant with their child. Paul has a nervous breakdown and confesses to his mother that he is addicted to cocaine and is deeply in debt.

By 2013, Paul has managed to rehabilitate his life and works for a vacuum repair company by day, while attending a creative writing workshop by night. At one of the workshop sessions, he talks to a young girl who asks him what he does. When he tells her he is a former DJ who specialized in garage music, she admits that the only techno she listens to is Daft Punk. Later, Paul goes to a club where he sees Guy-Man and Thomas again.

== Cast ==
- Félix de Givry as Paul
- Pauline Étienne as Louise
- Vincent Macaigne as Arnaud
- Hugo Conzelmann as Stan
- Zita Hanrot as Anaïs
- Roman Kolinka as Cyril
- Ugo Bienvenu as Quentin
- Paul Spera as Guillaume
- Greta Gerwig as Julia
- Laurent Cazanave as Nico
- Vincent Lacoste as Thomas
- Arnaud Azoulay as Guy-Man
- Sigrid Bouaziz as Anne-Claire
- Golshifteh Farahani as Yasmin
- Laura Smet as Margot
- Brady Corbet as Larry
- Claire Tran as Midori

== Production ==
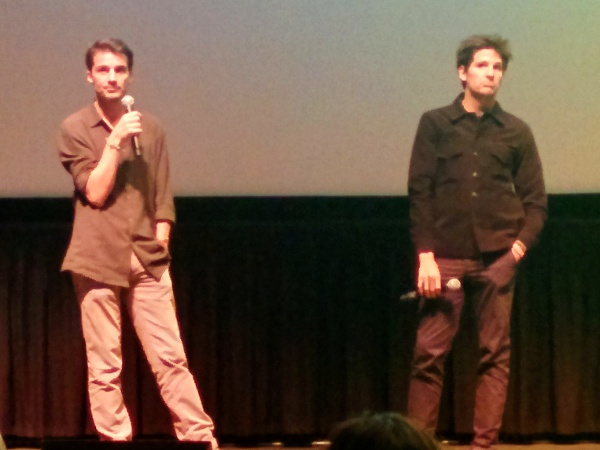
Sven Hansen-Løve (right) served as the inspiration for Paul, played by Félix de Givry (left).

The film is loosely based on Mia Hansen-Løve's brother Sven's life. In addition to being the inspiration behind the film he also co-wrote the script.

The film took three years to be produced in part because obtaining the rights to the music was so expensive. Hansen-Løve went through two different producers over the course of the pre-production process and was only able to obtain the necessary rights to license the music after Daft Punk agreed to license their music for the lowest possible fee causing other musicians to join them.

Filming began in November 2013 and was completed on 31 January 2014.

== Reception ==
Eden received generally positive reviews from critics. On Rotten Tomatoes, the film has a rating of 84% based on 97 reviews and an average rating of 7.4/10. The consensus statement reads, "Eden uses 1990s club culture as the appropriately intoxicating backdrop for a sensitive, low-key look at aging and the price of pursuing one's dreams." On Metacritic, the film has a score of 81 out of 100, based on 20 critics, indicating "universal acclaim".

On The Guardian's "The 100 best films of the 21st century" list, Eden is ranked 90th.
