= Marion Monnier =

French film editor (born 1979)

- Born: 1979 (age 46–47)
- Occupation: Film editor
- Years active: 2004–present

Marion Monnier (born 1979) is a French film editor.

== Filmography ==
Year	Title	Notes
2004	Clean	Assistant editor
2004	Right Now	Assistant editor
2005	Palais royal !	Assistant editor
2005	Le Marais	Documentary
2005	Spiral	TV series; assistant editor
2006	Noise	Documentary
2006	The Untouchable	
2006	Paris, je t'aime	Assistant editor
2006	French California	Assistant editor
2007	Chute libre	Short
2007	All Is Forgiven	
2007	R.I.S, police scientifique	TV series; assistant editor
2007	Maurice Pialat, Love Exists	Documentary; assistant editor
2008	Inju: The Beast in the Shadow	Assistant editor
2008	Eldorado	TV documentary
2009	Fais pas ci, fais pas ça	TV series
2009	Father of My Children	
2009	The Invisible Woman	
2009	Même pas en rêve	Short
2010	Carlos	European Film Award for Best Editor
2010	Rebecca H. (Return to the Dogs)	
2010	Small World	
2011	Goodbye First Love	
2011	Val d'or	Telefilm
2012	Atomic Age	
2012	In a Rush	
2012	Free Angela and All Political Prisoners	Documentary
2013	Homeland	
2014	Cœur de Tigre	Documentary short
2014	Clouds of Sils Maria	
2014	The Smell of Us	
2014	Eden	
2015	This Summer Feeling	
2015	Par accident	
2016	La Vache	
2016	Things to Come	
2016	Personal Shopper	
2018	Amanda	
2021	Bergman Island	
2022	One Fine Morning	
2025	The Wizard of the Kremlin	
