= Paul Berthier =

French organist and composer (1884–1953)

Paul Berthier (1884–1953) was the co-founder of Manécanterie des Petits Chanteurs à la Croix de Bois in 1906.

He wrote a doctoral thesis on the legal protection of composers which has long been authoritative and an essay on Jean-Philippe Rameau.

He was the organist at Auxerre Cathedral until 1953. He composed the famous Christmas lullaby Dors ma colombe.

He was married to composer Geneviève Parquin and was the father of Jacques Berthier. He was also the grandfather of the singer France Gall and great-grandfather of French producer, Raphael Hamburger.
