= Radiooooo =

French music website

Radiooooo is a French music discovery website and streaming app, based in Paris.

== History and name ==
Radiooooo was founded in 2013 by French disc jockey Benjamin Moreau. Each of the five Os of the company's name is meant to represent each of the world's five continents.

The website has been reviewed by The New Yorker and it is available as a mobile app.

== Website contents ==
Radiooooo users can upload songs, which are then curated by a community of DJs and producers. Tracks selected for streaming are made available via an interactive global map. Users peruse songs and playlists by selecting country and decade (rather than genre or artist). A shuffle mode allows users to listen to a curated playlist of songs across multiple nations and decades, alongside a 'taxi mode' allowing users to create their own "route" by selecting multiple nations and decades. The map features every nation, including some dependent territories (e.g. Gibraltar), and states with limited recognition (e.g. Palestine and the Sahrawi Arab Democratic Republic.), and a decade selector beginning at the 1900s, and ending at the 2020s, marked as "NOW". The map also changes certain nations upon selecting certain decades, with an example being the inclusion of French Equatorial Africa and French West Africa for every decade before the 1960s.

The website also has users sort every song they upload into three selectable moods, being marked as FAST, SLOW, and WEIRD.

The website uses a freemium model and offers a trial period of 7 days after creating an account, after which users must subscribe to access things such as listening history, a wider range of decades and countries, and the ability to skip tracks.

=== Islands ===
Radiooooo organizes certain songs into "islands" depending on their genre. Prominent islands include, in no particular order, Kids Playground, Classical, Gramophone, 8-Bit, Cover, and even artist and composer-based islands such as islands for David Bowie, Ennio Morricone, Quincy Jones, and Jane Birkin. Every week since the 9th of October, 2020, the curators of the website also organize their favorite tracks into a top ten list, which then surfaces as a weekly Top 10 island every Friday.
