= Bergman Island (2004 film) =

2006 film by Marie Nyreröd

- Directed by: Marie Nyreröd
- Starring: Ingmar Bergman
- Cinematography: Arne Carlsson
- Release date: April 8, 2004
- Running time: 83 minutes
- Country: Sweden
- Language: Swedish

Bergman Island is a 2004 documentary film directed by Marie Nyreröd and starring Ingmar Bergman. It screened at various film festivals, including the Gothenburg Film Festival.
