= Bluebeard (2009 film) =

- French release poster
- Directed by: Catherine Breillat
- Written by: Catherine Breillat
- Based on: "Bluebeard"
- Produced by: Sylvette Frydman; Jean-Francois Lepetit
- Starring: Lola Créton
- Cinematography: Vilko Fila
- Edited by: Pascale Chavance
- Production company: ARTE France
- Distributed by: Arte
- Release dates: 8 February 2009 (Berlinale); 6 October 2009 (France)
- Running time: 78 minutes
- Country: France
- Language: French
- Budget: $2.4 million
- Box office: $38,696

Bluebeard (French: Barbe Bleue) is a 2009 French drama fantasy film written and directed by Catherine Breillat and starring Lola Créton. It is based on the classic fairy tale Bluebeard, by Charles Perrault.

== Plot ==
In the 1950s, Catherine toys with her older sister, Marie-Anne, by reading her the story of Bluebeard which scares her. As Catherine rereads the story, the film moves to 1697, where two sisters, Marie-Catherine and Anne, have just lost their father. With the loss of their father the two have no dowries, and so agree to attend a party thrown by Lord Bluebeard, in his search for a new wife. Although it is rumored that Bluebeard has murdered all of his previous wives, as they all disappeared within a year after the marriage, Lord Bluebeard and Marie-Catherine, the younger sister, develop a connection and are soon married. Despite their age difference, the two develop a close bond, and Bluebeard dotes on his new young wife. He must leave her periodically to attend to far off business and when he does he gives her the keys to the castle and tells her to enjoy herself while he is gone. She appears to miss him terribly and is overjoyed when he returns.

The second time he must leave, he gives her the keys again, as well as a small gold key, which he says will open a room in the castle, but that she is forbidden to use it and enter the room. That night, she is overcome with curiosity and opens the room to find all of Bluebeard's past wives murdered and hanging. While in the room she drops the key, staining it with blood from the floor. Bluebeard returns unexpectedly the next day and discovers the blood upon the key and accuses her of entering the room. He tells her she must die, however she begs for time in the tower to make her peace with God. Bluebeard allows this, and through several other delays and distractions, she buys herself time, until two musketeers arrive and apparently behead Bluebeard.

Throughout the film, the scenes switch back and forth between the two girls reading the story, and the two sisters living it. The film closes with the older girl, Marie-Anne falling to her death as her little sister Catherine finishes the story despite Marie-Anne begging her not to, as it scares her. As Catherine cries, their mother enters (the same actress who plays the mother to the two sisters in the story) and the scene switches back to Marie-Catherine with her hands on Bluebeard's head on a platter.

== Cast ==
- Dominique Thomas as Barbe Bleue/Bluebeard
- Lola Créton as Marie-Catherine, Bluebeard's wife
- Daphné Baiwir as Anne
- Marilou Lopes-Benite as Catherine
- Lola Giovannetti as Marie-Anne

== Release ==
=== Theatrical release ===
Bluebeard premiered at the 2009 Berlin International Film Festival.

=== Critical response ===
Review aggregation website Rotten Tomatoes gives the film a score of 78% based on 36 reviews, with an average rating of 6.5/10. At Metacritic, which assigns a normalized rating out of 100 to reviews from mainstream critics, the film has received an average score of 73, based on 12 reviews.

J. Hoberman of The Village Voice gave the film a positive review, writing "Psychologically rich, unobtrusively minimalist, at once admirably straightforward and slyly comic, Catherine Breillat’s Bluebeard is a lucid retelling and simultaneous explanation of Charles Perrault’s nastiest, most un-Disneyfiable nursery story." Manohla Dargis from The New York Times wrote, "All fairy tales have morals and the one in Ms. Breillat's Bluebeard is brutal, suitably bloody and, like all good retellings, both similar to and different from earlier iterations." Keith Uhlich from Time Out rated the film 4/5 stars, calling it the director's "funniest and most immediately pleasurable film to date". In his review, Uhlich commended the film's cinematography, performances, and "critique of the scourge of patriarchy".

The film was not without its detractors. Owen Gleiberman from Entertainment Weekly awarded the film a grade C, criticizing the lack of mystery, and suspense, while also commending Breillat's direction.
