= One Fine Morning (film) =

2022 film by Mia Hansen-Løve

- Theatrical release poster
- French: Un beau matin
- Directed by: Mia Hansen-Løve
- Written by: Mia Hansen-Løve
- Produced by: Charlotte Dauphin; Philippe Martin; David Thion
- Starring: Léa Seydoux; Pascal Greggory; Melvil Poupaud; Nicole Garcia; Fejria Deliba; Camille Leban Martins; Sarah Le Picard; Pierre Meunier
- Cinematography: Denis Lenoir
- Edited by: Marion Monnier
- Production companies: Les Films Pelléas; Razor Film Produktion; Arte France Cinéma; Bayerischer Rundfunk; Mubi
- Distributed by: Les Films du Losange (France); Weltkino Filmverleih (Germany)
- Release dates: 20 May 2022 (Cannes); 5 October 2022 (France); 8 December 2022 (Germany)
- Running time: 112 minutes
- Countries: France; Germany
- Language: French
- Box office: $1.4 million

One Fine Morning (French: Un beau matin) is a 2022 romantic drama film written and directed by Mia Hansen-Løve. It stars Léa Seydoux, Pascal Greggory, Melvil Poupaud and Nicole Garcia. The film premiered in the Directors' Fortnight section of the 75th Cannes Film Festival on 20 May 2022, where it won the Europa Cinemas Label Award for Best European Film. It was released theatrically in France on 5 October 2022 and in Germany on 8 December 2022.

== Plot ==
Sandra Kienzler, a widow with a young daughter, Linn, works as a translator and interpreter in Paris. She cares for her father, Georg, a former philosophy teacher who has been diagnosed with a neurodegenerative disease called Benson's syndrome, which affects his cognitive abilities and sight.

At a park, Sandra runs into her late husband's friend Clément, a married chemical cosmologist who has returned to Paris after an expedition to the South Pole. They make plans for dinner. Clément takes Sandra to his lab after she expresses interest in his profession. There, they share a kiss. They subsequently begin an affair.

Sandra's mother, Françoise, who has divorced Georg and remarried, still helps care for him. She informs Sandra that his condition is worsening. He can no longer dress himself or use the bathroom and has frequent hallucinations. She says it is time to put him in a nursing home, where he will receive the full-time care he needs—to which Sandra agrees. They encounter problems in placement, as public homes may take up to two years to vacate a room and private ones are too expensive. He is placed in a hospital in the meantime. Sandra bumps into one of Georg's former students. The student is very fond of him and asks to write to him. Sandra gives her her e-mail as a go-between.

Following Georg's admission, Sandra and her family clear out his apartment, which is packed with his beloved books. She takes a few and contacts the former student, offering her the remainder.

At the hospital, Georg talks constantly about his long-term girlfriend, Leïla. He is confused about where he is. Sandra notices that his condition has deteriorated. He is moved temporarily into a public home, as the hospital can no longer have him. However, because he is somewhat independent in comparison to the other residents, the facility gives the family a week to find him a new home. They ultimately place him at a private nursing home at Montmartre, a short distance by métro.

Sandra's relationship with Clément starts to deteriorate. He cannot muster the courage to leave his wife and son, and she does not want to be just his mistress. While at the park with Sandra and Linn, Clément sees friends of his wife, and they escape the park immediately. At home, they have a discussion, and Clément declares he'll return once he leaves his wife.

While tidying her home, Sandra finds a little notebook used by Georg to keep track of his declining health, along with other notebooks that she identifies as a rough manuscript of an autobiography Georg had once mentioned wanting to write. She tells her mother and sister about her findings during Christmas dinner, and that one of the notebooks had a title written in German: "An einem schönen Morgen" (lit. on a fine morning), which she translates to French as "One Fine Morning".

Clément ends his marriage and returns to Sandra. Summer comes along. Sandra, Linn and Clément visit Georg at the private home. They talk about their trip to Italy. Georg asks for Leïla, and continues to state he does not know what he is doing there, or why he is there. He no longer recognizes his daughter or granddaughter. As they talk in his room, one of the nurses invites them to a group activity. Georg, along with Sandra, Linn, and Clément, joins the other residents who are gathered in a circle. They are given lyrics to the song "Mon amant de Saint-Jean", and sing it a cappella together. Sandra becomes overwhelmed and starts crying. She asks Clément and Linn to leave with her.

Sandra, Clément and Linn climb up the Sacré-Cœur Basilica's butte. As they arrive at the dome, they observe Paris.

== Cast ==
- Léa Seydoux as Sandra Kienzler
- Pascal Greggory as Georg Kienzler, Sandra's father
- Melvil Poupaud as Clément, an old friend of Sandra
- Nicole Garcia as Françoise, Sandra's mother and Georg's former wife
- Fejria Deliba as Leïla, Georg's companion
- Camille Leban Martins as Linn, Sandra's daughter
- Sarah Le Picard as Elodie Kienzler, Sandra's sister
- Pierre Meunier as Michel

== Production ==
In September 2020, it was announced that Léa Seydoux, Pascal Greggory, Melvil Poupaud, and Nicole Garcia had joined the cast of the film, with Mia Hansen-Løve directing from a screenplay she wrote. Principal photography began in June 2021 in Paris.

== Release ==
One Fine Morning is produced by Les Films Pelléas in co-production with Arte France Cinéma, Dauphin Films, Germany's Razor Film and Mubi, with worldwide sales handled by Les Films du Losange and Mubi distributing in the United Kingdom, Ireland, Turkey, and India. The film had its world premiere in the Directors' Fortnight section of the 75th Cannes Film Festival on 20 May 2022. It was released theatrically in France on 5 October 2022 by Les Films du Losange and in Germany on 8 December 2022 by Weltkino Filmverleih. The film was released theatrically by Sony Pictures Classics in North America, Latin America, and the Middle East, and through video on demand on 11 April 2023.

== Reception ==
=== Box office ===
One Fine Morning grossed $421,639 in France and $959,273 in other territories, for a worldwide total of $1.4 million.

=== Critical response ===
On the review aggregator website Rotten Tomatoes, the film holds an approval rating of 93% based on 151 reviews, with an average rating of 8.2/10. The website's critics consensus reads, "Finely wrought to a fault, One Fine Morning presents a subtle, well-acted look at life and love". Metacritic, which uses a weighted average, assigned the film a score of 86 out of 100, based on 39 reviews, indicating "universal acclaim".
