= Things to Come (2016 film) =

Film by Mia Hansen-Løve

- Theatrical release poster
- French: L'Avenir
- Directed by: Mia Hansen-Løve
- Written by: Mia Hansen-Løve
- Produced by: Charles Gillibert
- Starring: Isabelle Huppert; André Marcon; Roman Kolinka; Édith Scob
- Cinematography: Denis Lenoir
- Edited by: Marion Monnier
- Production companies: CG Cinéma; Detail Film; Arte France Cinéma; Rhône-Alpes Cinéma
- Distributed by: Les Films du Losange (France); Weltkino Filmverleih (Germany)
- Release dates: 13 February 2016 (Berlinale); 6 April 2016 (France); 18 August 2016 (Germany)
- Running time: 102 minutes
- Countries: France; Germany
- Language: French
- Budget: €3.2 million
- Box office: $5.6 million

Things to Come (French: L'Avenir, pronounced [lavniʁ], lit. 'The Future')) is a 2016 drama film written and directed by Mia Hansen-Løve. It stars Isabelle Huppert as Nathalie Chazeaux, a middle-aged philosophy professor whose life undergoes a series of changes. The film explores the themes of aging, family ties, intellectual passion, and personal freedom.

Things to Come premiered in the main competition at the 66th Berlin International Film Festival, where Hansen-Løve won the Silver Bear for Best Director. The film received widespread critical acclaim and Huppert won several nominations and awards for her performance, including the National Society of Film Critics Award for Best Actress, New York Film Critics Circle Award for Best Actress, Los Angeles Film Critics Association Award for Best Actress, and the London Film Critics' Circle Award for Actress of the Year. It is considered among the best films of the 2010s and of the 21st century.

Things to Come was released theatrically in France on 6 April 2016 by Les Films du Losange and in Germany on 18 August 2016 by Weltkino Filmverleih.

== Plot ==
Nathalie teaches philosophy in a Parisian high school, but for her it is not just a job, it is a way of living and thinking. With a past permeated by youthful idealism, she now aims to teach students to think for themselves, using philosophical texts that stimulate confrontation and discussion. Her life flows between her work, her husband, her two grown children, and her ex-model mother who needs constant attention. However, suddenly everything changes: her husband leaves her, her mother dies and Nathalie finds herself with unexpected and unusual freedom.

== Cast ==
- Isabelle Huppert as Nathalie Chazeaux
- André Marcon as Heinz
- Roman Kolinka as Fabien
- Édith Scob as Yvette Lavastre
- Sarah Le Picard as Chloé
- Solal Forte as Johann
- Élise Lhomeau as Elsa
- Lionel Dray as Hugo
- Grégoire Montana-Haroche as Simon
- Lina Benzerti as Antonia
- Yves Heck as Daniel

== Production ==
Hansen-Løve said she wrote the role of Nathalie with Isabelle Huppert in mind. She also said Nathalie was loosely based on her mother, who was a philosophy professor and separated from her husband later in life. Principal photography began on 22 June 2015 in Paris.

== Reception ==
=== Critical response ===
Things to Come received critical acclaim. On the review aggregator website Rotten Tomatoes, the film holds an approval rating of 99% based on 150 reviews, with an average rating of 8.2/10. The website's critics consensus reads, "A union to cherish between a writer-director and star working at peak power, Things to Come offers quietly profound observations on life, love, and the irrevocable passage of time." At Metacritic, the film received a weighted average score of 88 out of 100, based on 28 reviews from mainstream critics, indicating "universal acclaim".

=== Box office ===
Things to Come grossed $5.6 million at the worldwide box office.

=== Accolades ===
List of awards and nominations
Award	Date of ceremony	Category	Recipient(s)	Result	Ref.
Austin Film Critics Association	28 December 2016	Best Foreign-Language Film	Things to Come	Nominated	
Berlin International Film Festival	21 February 2016	Best Director	Mia Hansen-Løve	Won	
Berlin International Film Festival	21 February 2016	Golden Bear	Mia Hansen-Løve	Nominated	
Boston Society of Film Critics	11 December 2016	Best Actress	Isabelle Huppert (also for Elle)	Won	
Boston Society of Film Critics	11 December 2016	Best Foreign Film	Things to Come	Runner-up	
Chicago International Film Festival	22 October 2016	Golden Hugo	Mia Hansen-Løve	Nominated	
Dorian Awards	26 January 2017	Foreign Language Film of the Year	Things to Come	Nominated	
Dublin Film Critics' Circle	17 December 2016	Best Actress	Isabelle Huppert	Nominated	
IndieWire Critics Poll	19 December 2016	Best Actress	Isabelle Huppert	10th Place	
Jerusalem Film Festival	17 July 2016	The Wilf Family Foundation Award – Best International Film	Mia Hansen-Løve	Nominated	
London Film Critics' Circle	22 January 2017	Actress of the Year	Isabelle Huppert	Won	
London Film Critics' Circle	22 January 2017	Foreign Language Film of the Year	Things to Come	Nominated	
Los Angeles Film Critics Association	4 December 2016	Best Actress	Isabelle Huppert (also for Elle)	Won	
National Society of Film Critics	7 January 2017	Best Actress	Isabelle Huppert (also for Elle)	Won	
National Society of Film Critics	7 January 2017	Best Foreign Language Film	Things to Come	3rd Place (Note: Tied with Elle)	
New York Film Critics Circle	1 December 2016	Best Actress	Isabelle Huppert (also for Elle)	Won	
Prix Louis-Delluc	14 December 2016	Best Film	Mia Hansen-Løve	Nominated	
