= Bergman Island (2021 film) =

2021 film by Mia Hansen-Løve

- French theatrical release poster
- Directed by: Mia Hansen-Løve
- Written by: Mia Hansen-Løve
- Produced by: Charlotte Dauphin; Charles Gillibert; Rodrigo Teixeira; Erik Hemmendorff; Lisa Widén
- Starring: Vicky Krieps; Tim Roth; Mia Wasikowska; Anders Danielsen Lie
- Cinematography: Denis Lenoir
- Edited by: Marion Monnier
- Production companies: CG Cinéma; Neue Bioskop Film; Scope Pictures; Plattform Produktion; Piano; Arte France Cinéma; RT Features; Dauphin Films; Talipot Studio; Scope Invest
- Distributed by: TriArt Film (Sweden); Les Films du Losange (France); Weltkino Filmverleih (Germany); Cinépolis Distribución (Mexico); Pandora Filmes (Brazil)
- Release dates: 11 July 2021 (Cannes); 14 July 2021 (France); 1 October 2021 (Sweden); 4 November 2021 (Germany); 6 January 2022 (Mexico); 24 February 2022 (Brazil)
- Running time: 113 minutes
- Countries: France; Mexico; Brazil; Germany; Sweden
- Languages: English; Swedish
- Box office: $1 million

Bergman Island is a 2021 romantic drama film written and directed by Mia Hansen-Løve. It stars Vicky Krieps, Tim Roth, Mia Wasikowska and Anders Danielsen Lie.

Krieps and Roth play a married couple of filmmakers spending a working retreat on Fårö where cracks begin to appear in their marriage.

It had its world premiere at the Cannes Film Festival on 11 July in 2021. It was released in France on 14 July in 2021 by Les Films du Losange. It was released in Sweden on 1 October in 2021.

== Plot ==
A filmmaking couple, Chris and Tony Sanders, travel to Fårö, the island where Ingmar Bergman lived and worked, to attend a film screening. Tony is an admirer of Bergman and is inspired by the island. Chris struggles with a dislike for Bergman for his personal failings, specifically in how he treated the women in his life and as a father, despite loving his movies. During the Q&A after a screening of Tony's film, Chris sneaks out. At the church where Bergman is buried she meets Hampus, a Swedish film student also participating in a residency. She decides to take him up on his offer to explore the island, leaving Tony to take the touristy Bergman Safari alone.

The next day after Chris realizes how productive Tony has found his time on the island she reveals she is struggling with her work and has only a rough outline. She decides to share her work with Tony, hoping he can help her. Tony isn't at his desk in a neighboring cottage, so Chris sneaks a look at Tony's journal. She discovers that Tony has hand drawn a number of provocative and abusive pictures of female figures in painful, subjugated positions.

In the screenplay Chris is writing, Amy, an American filmmaker in her late 20s, is travelling to Fårö for the wedding of a friend. Another one of the guests is a man named Joseph. Amy and Joseph had a love affair as teens and then rekindled their relationship as adults before breaking up once more. During the pre-wedding celebrations they spend the day together and then, after the wedding, go skinny dipping before having sex. The two discuss still being in love with each other despite both being in relationships and loving other people. Amy is crushed when she realizes that Joseph has been repeatedly unfaithful to his girlfriend. The following morning Joseph expresses regret that they slept together while Amy is unrepentant. Amy tries to continue their affair during the brief time they have left but Joseph repeatedly brushes her off. After asking if he can see her in her room on the final night, Joseph fails to come and Amy later learns he left the island without telling her. Amy returns to her rented home and Chris confesses this is where she is stuck on her screenplay offering the morbid idea that Amy could possibly attempt suicide. Several times during Chris' telling Tony interrupts Chris, takes phone calls, or is otherwise disengaged, and ultimately says he can't help her with the ending.

Tony leaves Fårö to collect their daughter June and bring her to the island. Chris heads to her study to work on her screenplay.

Chris travels to the Bergman Estate and runs into Hampus on his way out. He leaves her the key and she falls asleep. She is woken up by Anders Danielsen Lie who reveals that despite wrapping up his scenes for the day he has stayed in order to see Bergman's house. He expresses disappointment Chris did not write a scene in which he could appear in Bergman's house and Chris shows him the library. Later they attend a dinner with Mia Wasikowska. Anders Danielsen Lie and Chris play a game of Ludo late into the night. He thanks her for casting him in her movie before encouraging her to go to sleep before the busy day ahead.

Tony returns to the island with June, who reunites with Chris at a windmill on Bergman's property.

== Cast ==
- Vicky Krieps as Chris Sanders
- Tim Roth as Tony Sanders
- Mia Wasikowska as Amy / herself
- Anders Danielsen Lie as Joseph / himself
- Hampus Nordenson as Hampus
- Anki Larsson as Åse
- Kerstin Brunnberg as Hedda
- Melinda Kinnaman as Berit
- Stig Björkman as Stig
- Joel Spira as Jonas
- Clara Strauch as Nicolette
- Matthew Lessner as Super 8 Man
- Gabe Klinger as American Man

== Production ==
In May 2017, it was announced Greta Gerwig, John Turturro, and Mia Wasikowska had joined the cast of the film, with Mia Hansen-Løve directing from a screenplay she wrote. Charles Gillibert will serve as producer on the film, under his CG Cinema banner. In May 2018, Anders Danielsen Lie joined the cast of the film, with Rodrigo Teixeira joining as a producer, under his RT Features banner. In August 2018, it was announced Vicky Krieps had joined the cast of the film, replacing Gerwig who had to drop out due to scheduling conflicts. Piano also served as a producer on the film, along with co-producer Charlotte Dauphin of Dauphin Films. Owen Wilson was originally slated to replace Turturro in the role of Tony, until Tim Roth was finally cast in May 2019.

=== Filming ===
Principal photography began on 9 August 2018 on Fårö, an island in Sweden. Production paused on 11 September 2018 and recommenced on 17 June 2019.

== Release ==
Bergman Island had its world premiere at the Cannes Film Festival on 11 July 2021. It was released in France on 14 July 2021 by Les Films du Losange, in Germany on 4 November 2021 by Weltkino Filmverleih, in Mexico on 6 January 2022 by Cinépolis Distribución, and in Brazil on 24 February 2022 by Pandora Filmes. In June 2021, IFC Films acquired US distribution rights to the film, while Mubi acquired the rights for UK and Ireland distribution. It was also selected in the Icon section of the 26th Busan International Film Festival and was screened in the festival in October 2021. The film had its North American premiere at the Toronto International Film Festival on 13 September 2021.

== Reception ==
=== Critical response ===
On Rotten Tomatoes, Bergman Island holds an approval rating of 83% based on reviews from 160 critics, with an average rating of 7.5/10. The site's critics consensus reads, "Minor but charming, the well-acted Bergman Island uses the titular filmmaker's legacy as the launchpad for a dreamlike rumination on romance and creativity." On Metacritic, the film holds a rating of 80 out of 100, based on 32 critics, indicating "generally favorable reviews".

In June 2025, IndieWire ranked the film at number 42 on its list of "The 100 Best Movies of the 2020s (So Far)."

=== Accolades ===
Year	Award	Category	Nominee(s)	Result	Ref.
2023	15th Gaudí Awards	Best European Film		Nominated	
