= All Is Forgiven (film) =

- Film poster
- Directed by: Mia Hansen-Løve
- Written by: Mia Hansen-Løve
- Produced by: Philippe Martin; David Thion
- Starring: Paul Blain; Marie-Christine Friedrich; Victoire Rousseau; Constance Rousseau
- Cinematography: Pascal Auffray
- Edited by: Marion Monnier
- Production company: Les Films Pelléas
- Distributed by: Pyramide Distribution
- Release dates: 19 May 2007 (Cannes); 26 September 2007 (France)
- Running time: 105 minutes
- Country: France
- Languages: French; German

All Is Forgiven (French: Tout est pardonné) is a 2007 French drama film written and directed by Mia Hansen-Løve in her directorial debut. It was screened in the Directors' Fortnight section of the 2007 Cannes Film Festival. It won the Louis Delluc Prize for Best First Film. It was also nominated for the César Award for Best First Feature Film at the 2008 César Awards.

== Plot ==
Victor (Paul Blain) is a Frenchman living in Austria with his wife Annette and their six-year-old daughter Pamela. Victor is aimless, working infrequently as a teacher and a writer. He begins to use drugs and drink at night. Annette moves to Paris hoping it will cure Victor's depression, but his drug use becomes more frequent and he becomes abusive.

After they separate, Victor begins an affair with Gisèle, who is also addicted to drugs. When she overdoses he is inspired to seek treatment. While visiting Victor in rehab, Annette tells him she cannot forgive him and that she is taking Pamela with her to Caracas; she asks him to never contact her again.

Eleven years later Pamela receives a message from her paternal aunt, Martine. Against her mother's wishes she responds to the message, and learns her father never left Paris and her mother has been blocking all attempts at communication between him and Pamela.

The two are able to meet a handful of times before Pamela goes on vacation. However, before she can return, Victor dies abruptly.

His last letter to her contains several poems, including one in German about loss and rebirth which Pamela later translates for her friend.

== Cast ==
- Paul Blain as Victor
- Marie-Christine Friedrich as Annette
- Victoire Rousseau and Constance Rousseau as Pamela
- Carole Franck as Martine
- Olivia Ross as Gisèle
- Alice Langlois as Judith
- Pascal Bongard as André
- Éleonore Rousseau as Alix
- Claude Duneton as le grand-père
- Alice Meiringer as Karine
- Katrin Daliot as Agnès
- Elena Fischer-Dieskau as Nektar
