= Globe de Cristal Award for Best Actor =

The Globe de Cristal Award for Best Actor was first awarded in 2006.

== Winners and nominees ==
=== 2000s ===
Year	Winner and nominees	Film	Director
2006 (1st)
2006 (1st)	Romain Duris	The Beat That My Heart Skipped	Jacques Audiard
2006 (1st)	Michel Bouquet	The Last Mitterrand	Robert Guédiguian
2006 (1st)	Clovis Cornillac	Le cactus	Gérard Bitton & Michel Munz
2006 (1st)	Benoît Poelvoorde	Entre ses mains	Anne Fontaine
2006 (1st)	José Garcia	The Axe	Costa-Gavras
2007 (2nd)
2007 (2nd)	François Cluzet	Tell No One	Guillaume Canet
2007 (2nd)	Jean Dujardin	OSS 117: Cairo, Nest of Spies	Michel Hazanavicius
2007 (2nd)	Albert Dupontel	Locked Out	Albert Dupontel
2007 (2nd)	Gérard Depardieu	When I Was a Singer	Xavier Giannoli
2007 (2nd)	Roschdy Zem	Mauvaise foi	Roschdy Zem
2008 (3rd)
2008 (3rd)	Romain Duris	Molière	Laurent Tirard
2008 (3rd)	Jean-Pierre Marielle	Let's Dance	Noémie Lvovsky
2008 (3rd)	Vincent Lindon	Those Who Remain	Anne Le Ny
2008 (3rd)	Mathieu Amalric	The Diving Bell and the Butterfly & Heartbeat Detector	Julian Schnabel & Nicolas Klotz
2009 (4th)
2009 (4th)	Vincent Cassel	Mesrine	Jean-François Richet
2009 (4th)	Albert Dupontel	Love Me No More	Jean Becker
2009 (4th)	Mathieu Amalric	Mesrine	Jean-François Richet
2009 (4th)	Roschdy Zem	The Girl from Monaco	Anne Fontaine
2009 (4th)	Kad Merad	Bienvenue chez les Ch'tis	Dany Boon

=== 2010s ===
Year	Winner and nominees	Film	Director
2010 (5th)
2010 (5th)	Tahar Rahim	A Prophet	Jacques Audiard
2010 (5th)	François Cluzet	In the Beginning	Xavier Giannoli
2010 (5th)	Yvan Attal	Leaving	Catherine Corsini
2010 (5th)	Vincent Lindon	Welcome	Philippe Lioret
2010 (5th)	Jean Dujardin	OSS 117: Lost in Rio	Michel Hazanavicius
2011 (6th)
2011 (6th)	Michael Lonsdale	Of Gods and Men	Xavier Beauvois
2011 (6th)	Romain Duris	Heartbreaker	Pascal Chaumeil
2011 (6th)	Gérard Depardieu	Mammuth	Benoît Delépine & Gustave Kervern
2011 (6th)	François Cluzet	Little White Lies	Guillaume Canet
2011 (6th)	Eric Elmosnino	Gainsbourg: A Heroic Life	Joann Sfar
2012 (7th)
2012 (7th)	Omar Sy	The Intouchables	Éric Toledano and Olivier Nakache
2012 (7th)	François Cluzet	The Intouchables	Éric Toledano and Olivier Nakache
2012 (7th)	Jean Dujardin	The Artist	Michel Hazanavicius
2012 (7th)	Olivier Gourmet	The Minister	Pierre Schoeller
2012 (7th)	Jean-Pierre Darroussin	The Snows of Kilimanjaro	Robert Guédiguian
2013 (8th)
2013 (8th)	Jérémie Renier	My Way	Florent Emilio Siri
2013 (8th)	Matthias Schoenaerts	Rust and Bone	Jacques Audiard
2013 (8th)	Jean-Louis Trintignant	Amour	Michael Haneke
2013 (8th)	Gilles Lellouche	Thérèse Desqueyroux	Claude Miller
2013 (8th)	Vincent Lindon	A Few Hours of Spring	Stéphane Brizé
2014 (9th)
2014 (9th)	Guillaume Gallienne	Me, Myself and Mum	Guillaume Gallienne
2014 (9th)	Niels Arestrup	The French Minister	Bertrand Tavernier
2014 (9th)	Albert Dupontel	9 Month Stretch	Albert Dupontel
2014 (9th)	Grégory Gadebois	One of a Kind	François Dupeyron
2014 (9th)	Fabrice Luchini	Bicycling with Molière	Philippe Le Guay
2015 (10th)
2015 (10th)	Pierre Niney	Yves Saint Laurent	Jalil Lespert
2015 (10th)	François Damiens	La Famille Bélier	Éric Lartigau
2015 (10th)	Reda Kateb	Hippocrate	Thomas Lilti
2015 (10th)	Gaspard Ulliel	Saint Laurent	Bertrand Bonello
2017 (11th)
2017 (11th)	Omar Sy	Chocolat	Roschdy Zem
2017 (11th)	Pierre Niney	Frantz	François Ozon
2017 (11th)	Vincent Cassel	It's Only the End of the World	Xavier Dolan
2017 (11th)	Gaspard Ulliel	It's Only the End of the World	Xavier Dolan
2017 (11th)	Lambert Wilson	The Odyssey	Jérôme Salle
2018 (12th)
2018 (12th)	Nahuel Pérez Biscayart	BPM (Beats per Minute)	Robin Campillo
2018 (12th)	Swann Arlaud	Bloody Milk	Hubert Charuel
2018 (12th)	Jean-Pierre Bacri	C'est la vie!	Éric Toledano and Olivier Nakache
2018 (12th)	François Damiens	Just to Be Sure	Carine Tardieu
2018 (12th)	Albert Dupontel	See You Up There	Albert Dupontel

=== Multiple nominees ===
4 nominations

- François Cluzet (1 win)
- Albert Dupontel

3 nominations

- Romain Duris (2 win)
- Jean Dujardin
- Vincent Lindon

2 nominations

- Omar Sy (2 win)
- Vincent Cassel (1 win)
- Pierre Niney (1 win)
- Mathieu Amalric
- Roschdy Zem
- Gérard Depardieu
- Gaspard Ulliel
- François Damiens

== See also ==
- César Award for Best Actor
