= Almost Friends =

Almost Friends may refer to:

- Almost Friends (2014 film), a 2014 French film
- Almost Friends (2016 film), a 2016 American film
