= Enquête sur un scandale d'État =

2021 French thriller film

- Directed by: Thierry De Peretti
- Written by: Thierry De Peretti; Jeanne Aptekman
- Produced by: Frédéric Jouve
- Starring: Roschdy Zem; Pio Marmaï; Vincent Lindon; Sandrine Kiberlain; Aure Atika; Jean-Marc Thibault
- Cinematography: Claire Mathon
- Edited by: Marion Monnier; Lila Desiles
- Distributed by: Pyramide Distribution
- Release date: 2021
- Running time: 123 minutes
- Country: France
- Language: French

Enquête sur un scandale d'État (Investigation into a state scandal), is a French crime thriller that was released to film festivals in 2021 and to wider audiences in February 2022. In Australia, the United States, and the United Kingdom it was released as "Undercover".

It is directed by Thierry de Peretti from his own screenplay (co-written with Jeanne Aptekman), and although it is a work of fiction, it is inspired by the real life case of François Thierry, and the book L'Infiltré (The Informant), written by the whistle-blower and drug crime infiltrator, Hubert Avoine, and Emmanuel Fansten, investigative journalist at the newspaper, Libération.

It stars Pio Marmaï, as Stéphane Vilner, an investigative journalist at Libération who writes the story of Hubert Antoine (played by Roschdy Zem), the whistle-blower and high-level police informant who breaks the story of illegal activity by the head of the Narcotics Unit, Jacques Billard, played by Vincent Lindon. The film conveys the intense relationship of Hubert and Stéphane, whose roles parallel the real-life co-authors of L'Infiltré, Hubert Avoine and Emmanuel Fansten. The question driving the journalist and his colleagues at Libération is, "how far should the state go to try to break the illegal drugs trade?"

== Filming ==
Peretti chose to film in 1.33 format, which is sometimes referred to as a square format, but which Peretti refers to as "reportage".

== Reception ==
The film was premiered at the San Sebastian film competition. At the competition, Claire Mathon won the prize for best cinematography for her work on the film. At the 2023 César awards it was nominated for the award for best adapted work.
