= Volpi Cup for Best Actor =

Venice Film Festival award

- Coppa Volpi per la migliore interpretazione maschile (Italian)
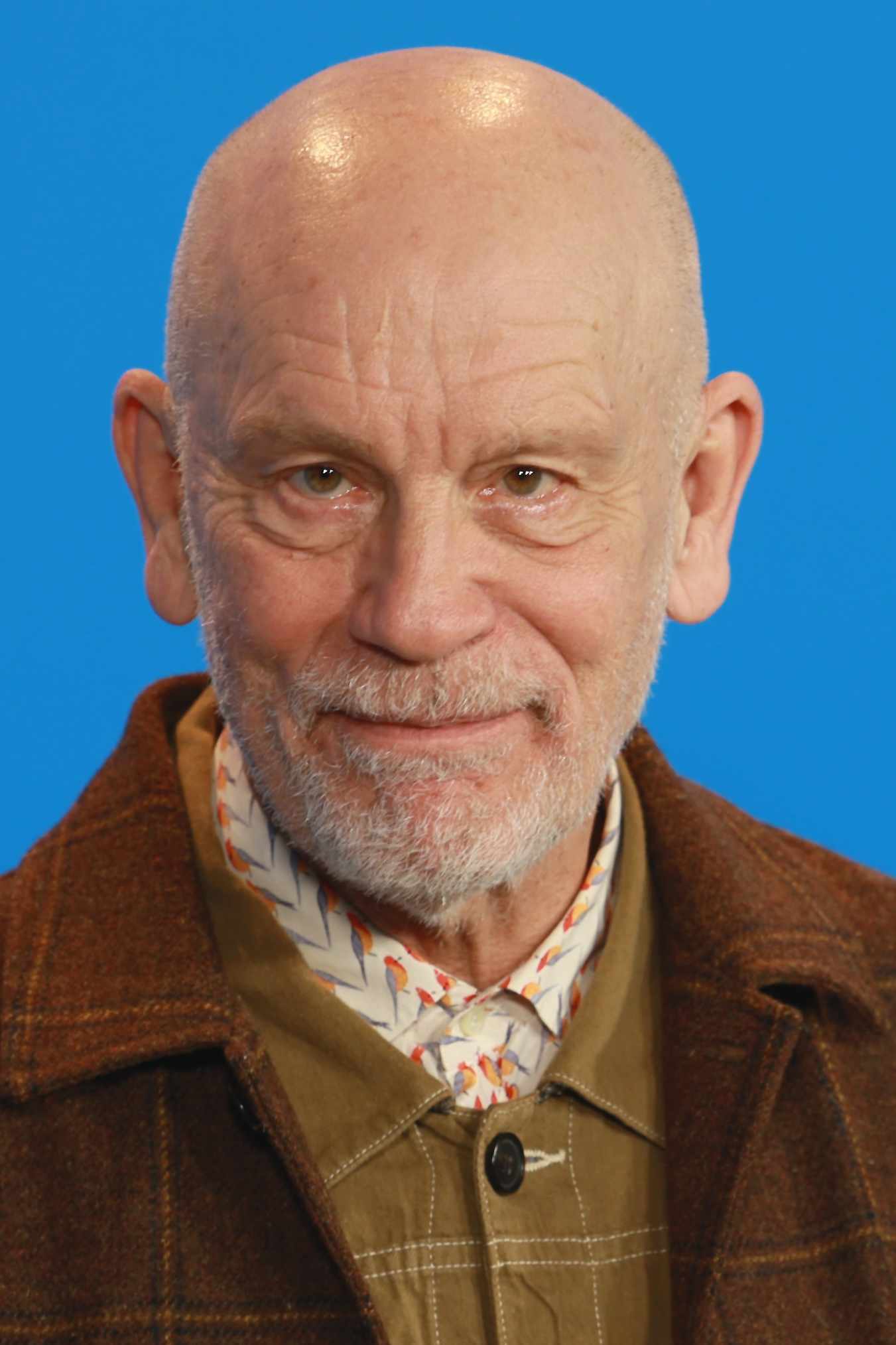
- 2026 recipient: John Malkovich
- Awarded for: Best Performance by an Actor
- Country: Italy
- Presented by: Venice Film Festival
- First award: 1932
- Currently held by: John Malkovich for Wild Horse Nine (2026)
- Website: labiennale.org/en/cinema

The Volpi Cup for Best Actor (Italian: Coppa Volpi per la migliore interpretazione maschile) is the principal award given to actors at the Venice Film Festival and is named in honor of Count Giuseppe Volpi di Misurata, the founder of the Venice Film Festival. The name and number of prizes have been changed several times since their introduction, ranging from two to four awards per edition and sometimes acknowledging both leading and supporting performances.

American actor John Malkovich was the most recent winner for his performance in Wild Horse Nine (2026), at the 83rd Venice International Film Festival.

== History ==
The festival was held for the first time in 1934. The acting award was named Grande medaglia d'oro dell'Associazione Nazionale Fascista dello Spettacolo per il migliore attore (Great Gold Medal of the National Fascist Association for Entertainment for the Best Actor). After a four-year hiatus due to the war, the festival reopened in 1947. The acting award in the immediate post-war period was named Premio Internazionale per il migliore attore (International Award for the Best Actor). The festival was again competitive in 1980 but the acting awards given by the competition jury were not reinstated until 1983: the prizes were no longer called Coppa Volpi (Volpi Cup) but were simply referred to as Premio per il migliore attore (Best Actor Award). The winners did not receive cup-shaped awards but were instead given rectangular plaques. In 1988, for the first time in 20 years, the most recognizable prizes of the festival were re-established. The two acting award was officially named Coppa Volpi per la migliore interpretazione maschile (Volpi Cup for the Best Actor).

== Winners ==
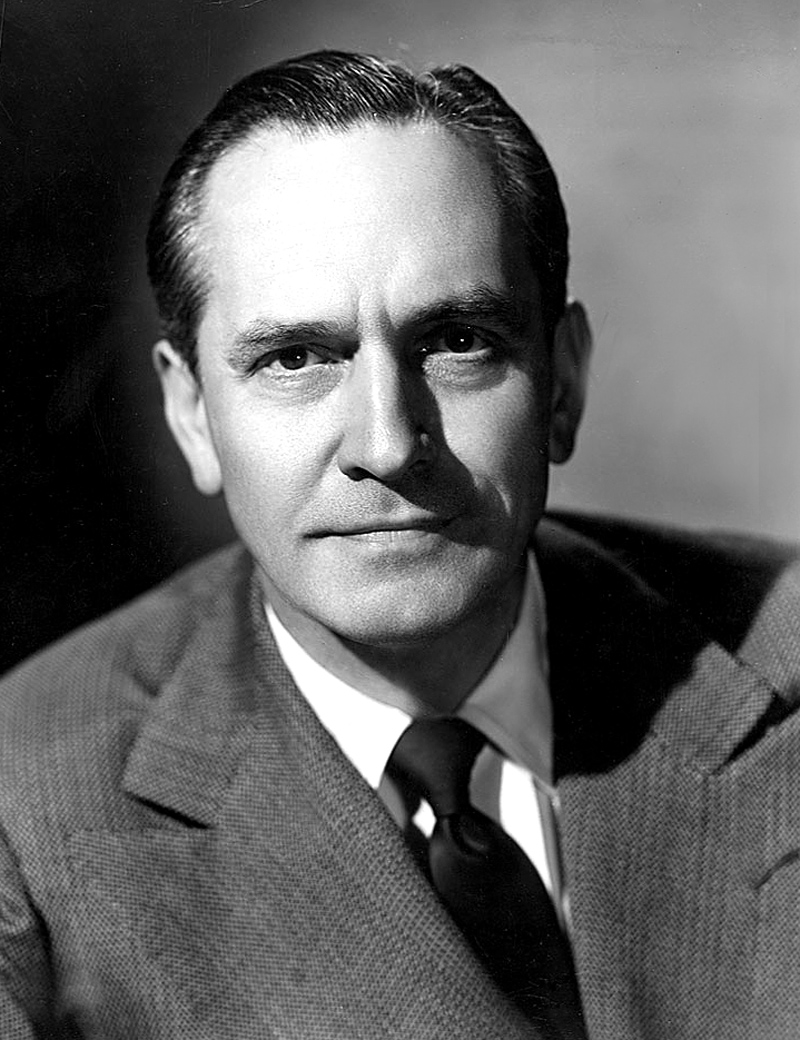
Fredric March won twice for Dr. Jekyll and Mr. Hyde (1932), and Death of a Salesman (1952)

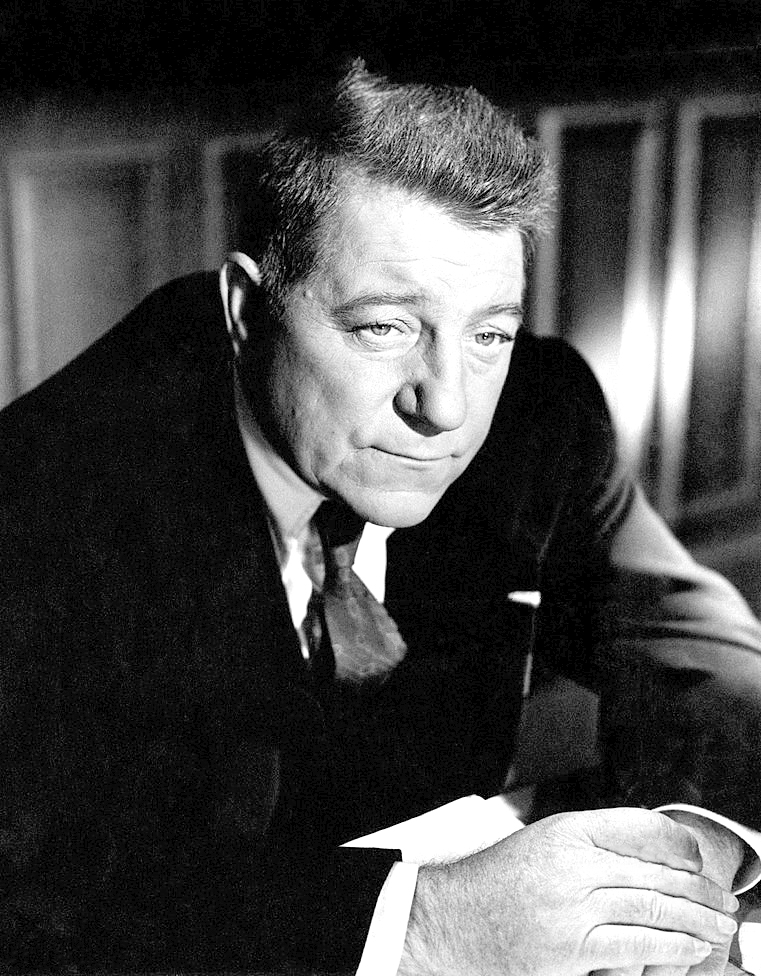
Jean Gabin won twice for The Night Is My Kingdom (1951) and both The Air of Paris & Honour Among Thieves (1954)

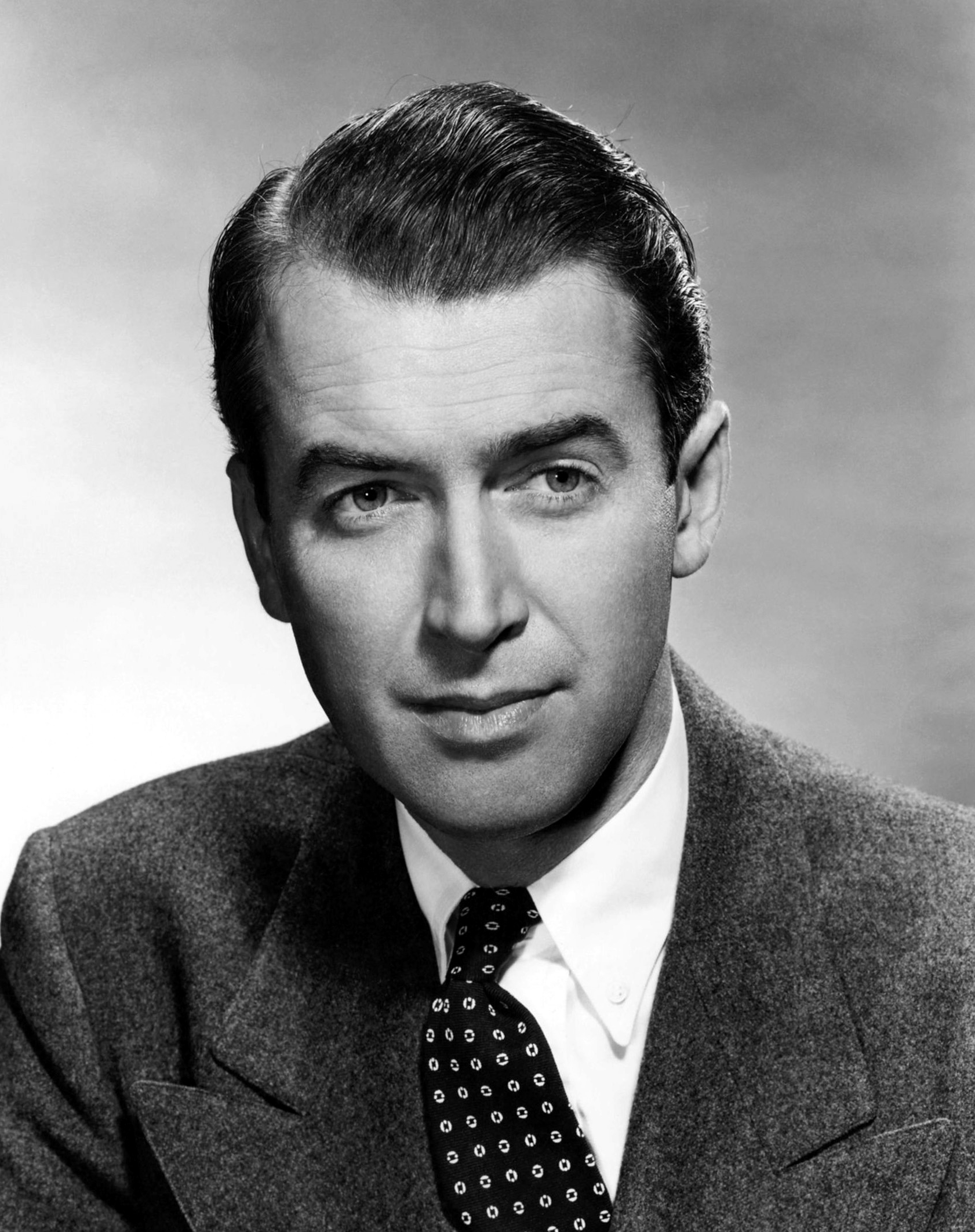
James Stewart won for Anatomy of a Murder (1958)

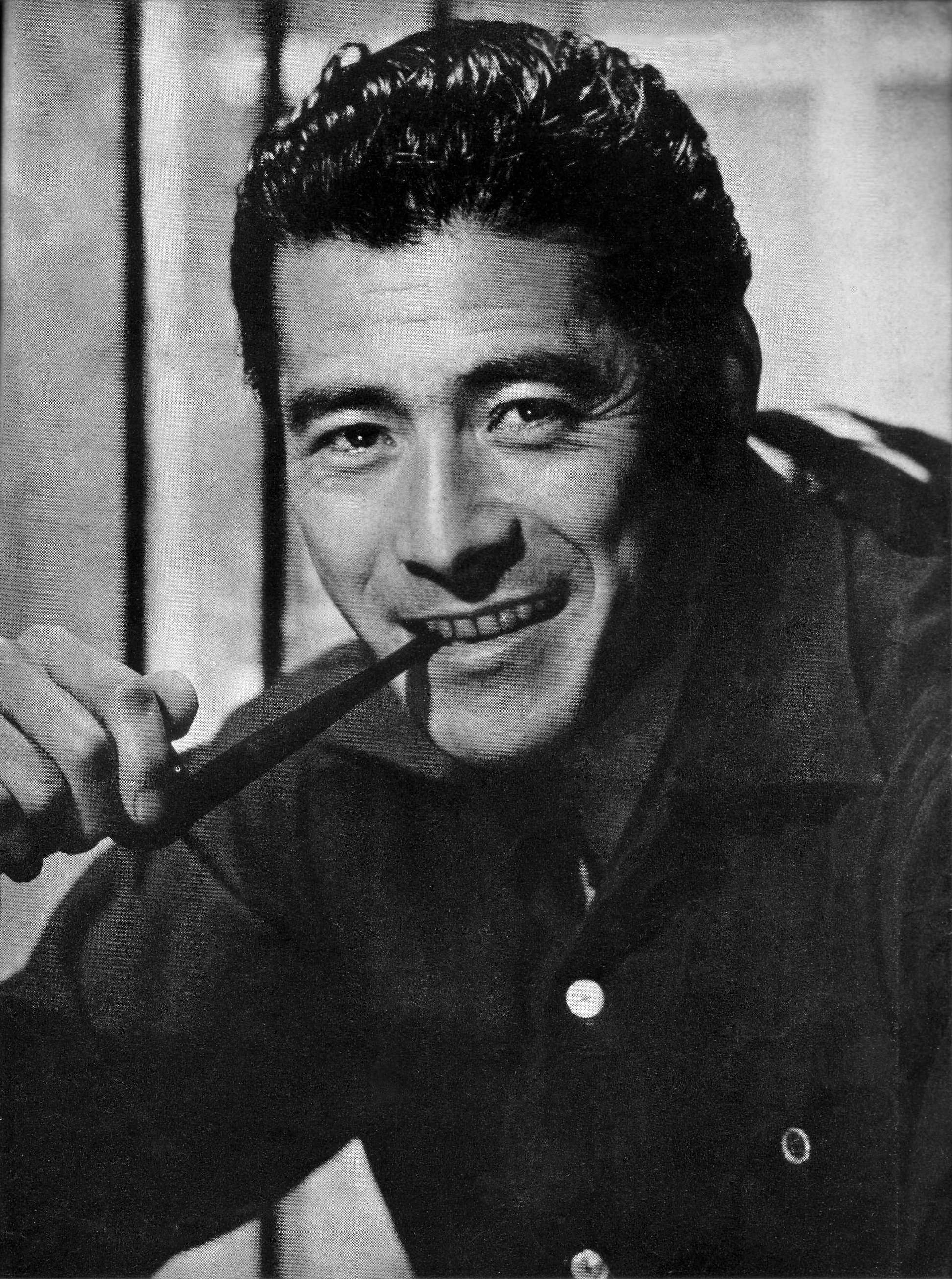
Toshiro Mifune won twice for Yojimbo (1961) and Red Beard (1965)

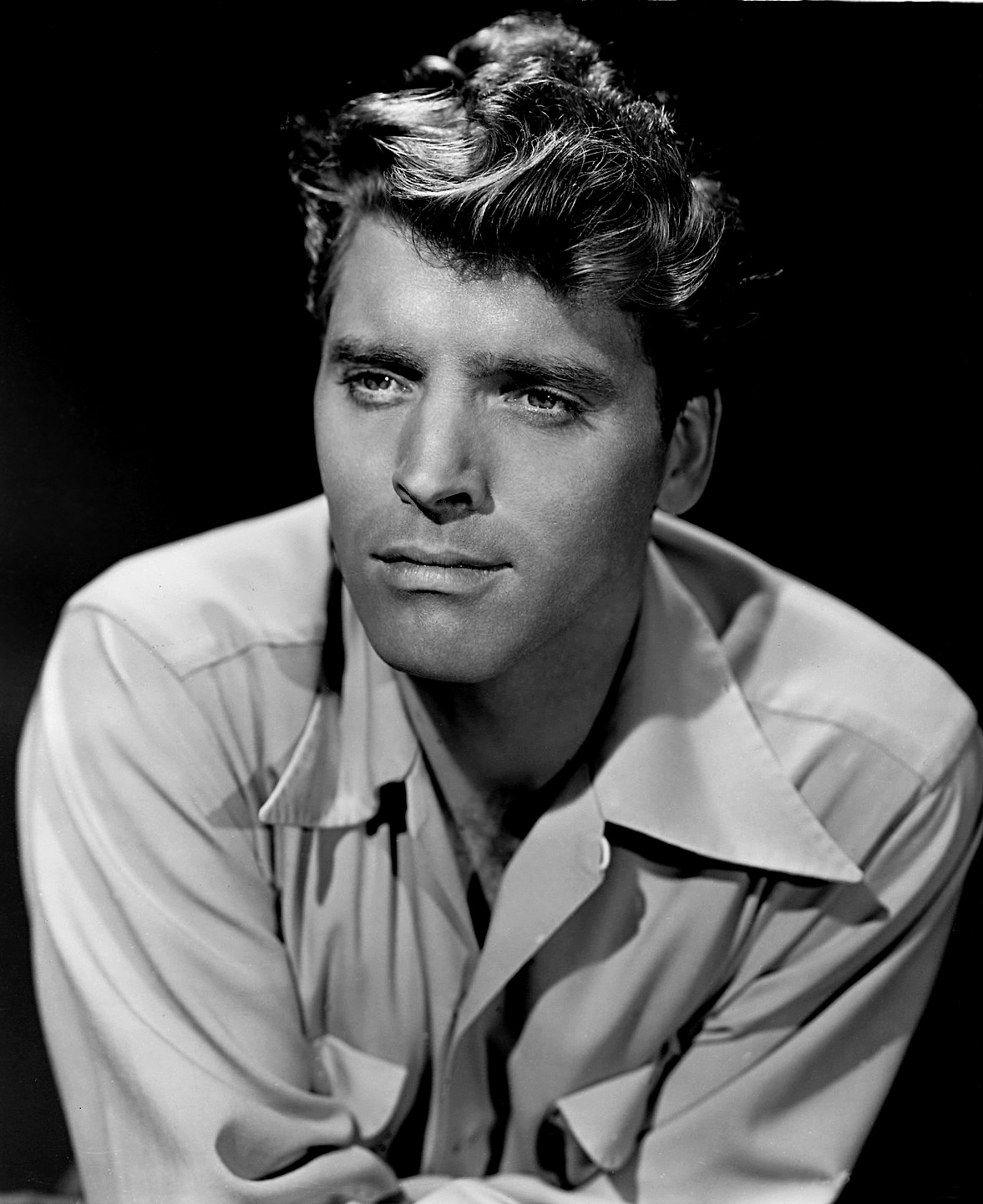
Burt Lancaster won for Birdman of Alcatraz (1962)

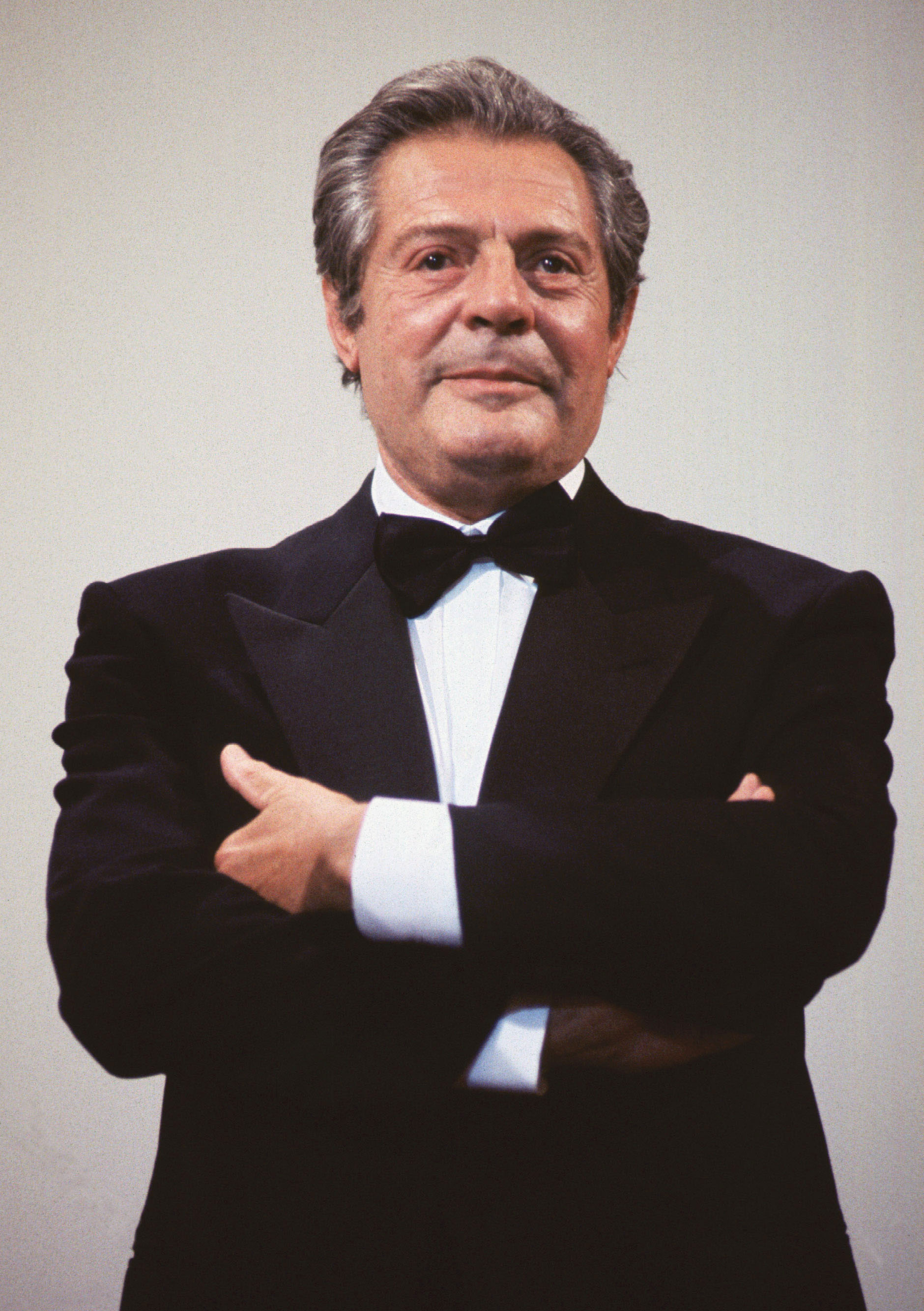
Marcello Mastroianni won twice for What Time Is It? (1989) and 1, 2, 3, Sun (1993)

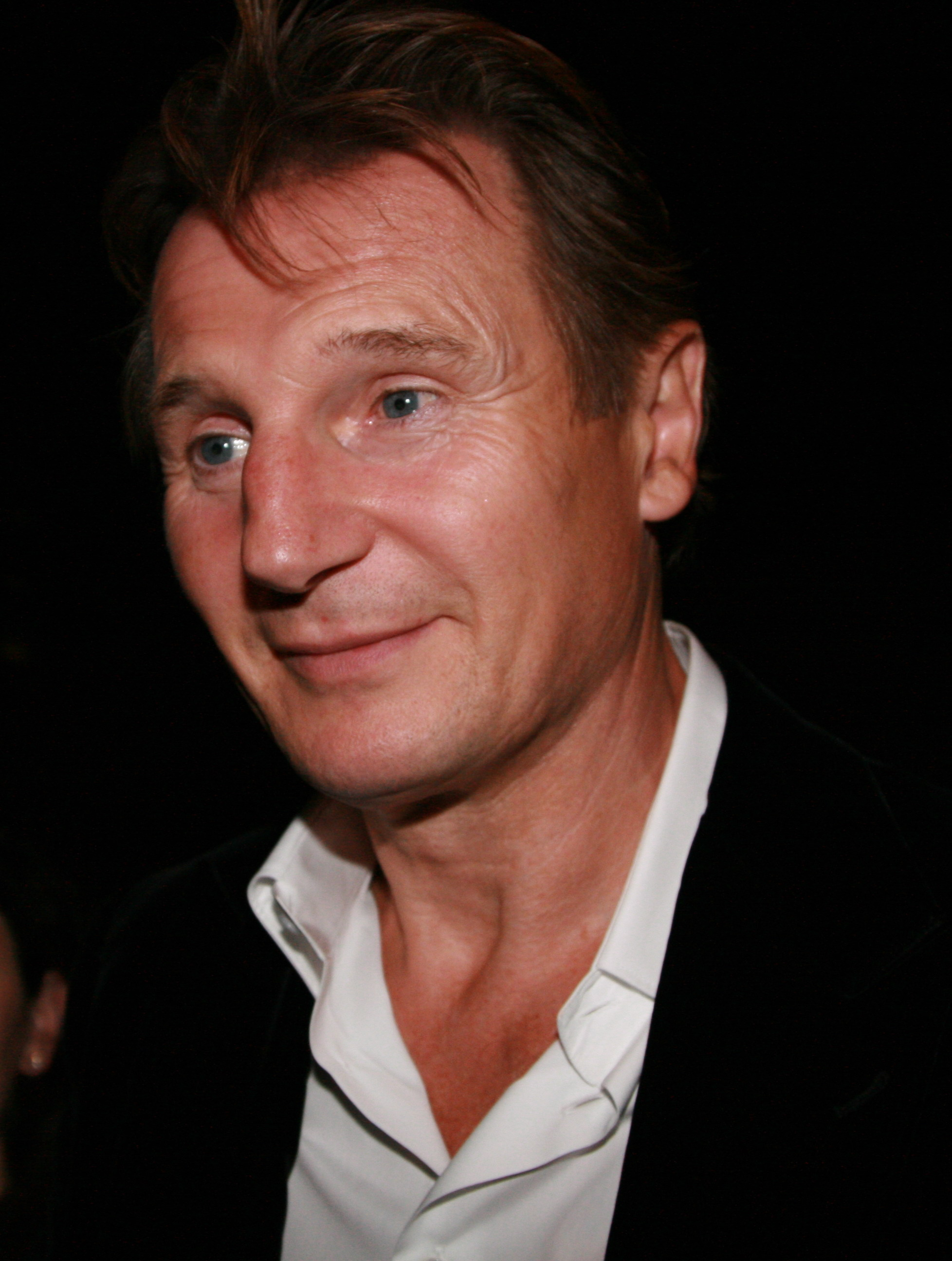
Liam Neeson won for Michael Collins (1996)

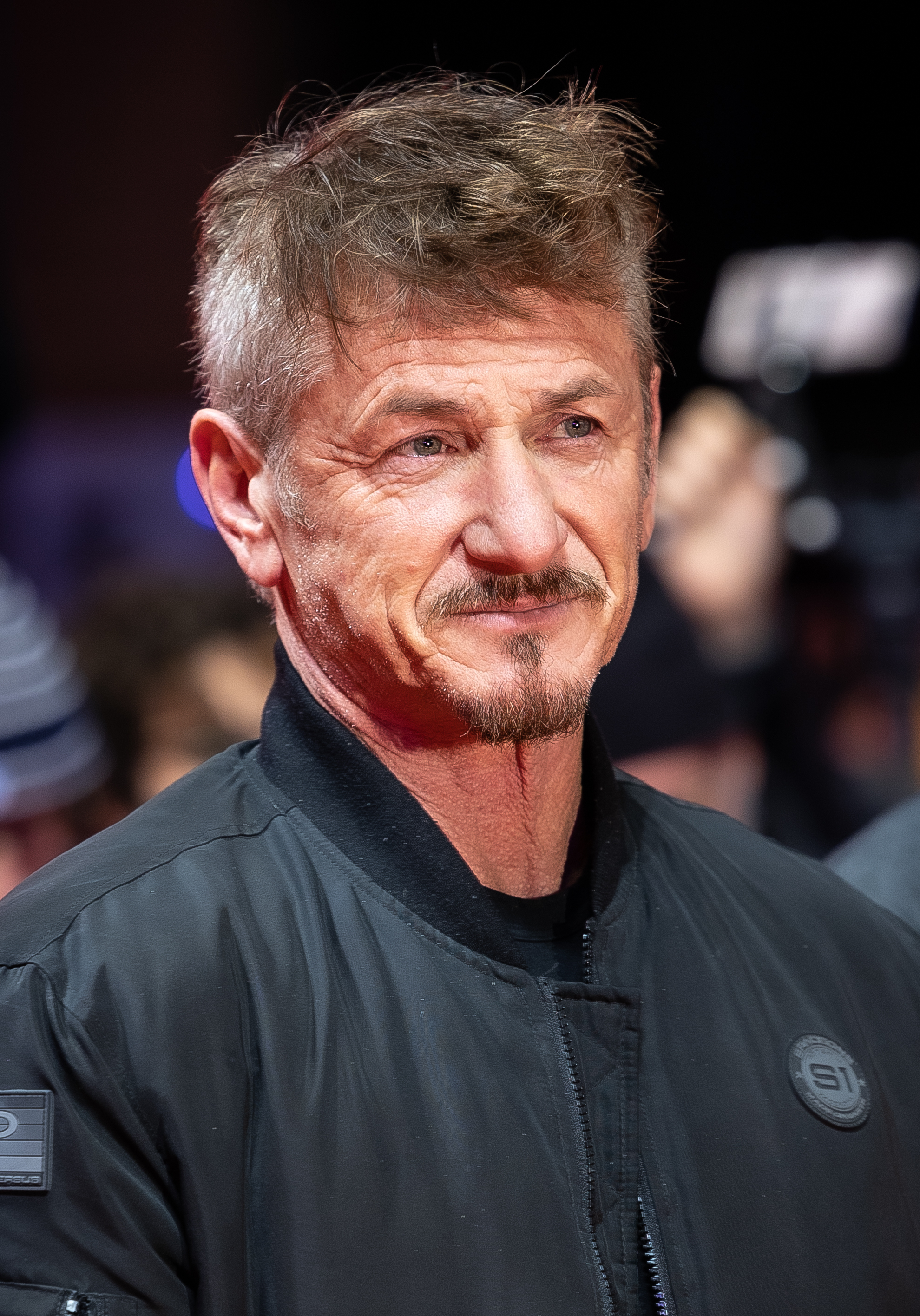
Sean Penn won twice for Hurlyburly (1998) and 21 Grams (2003)

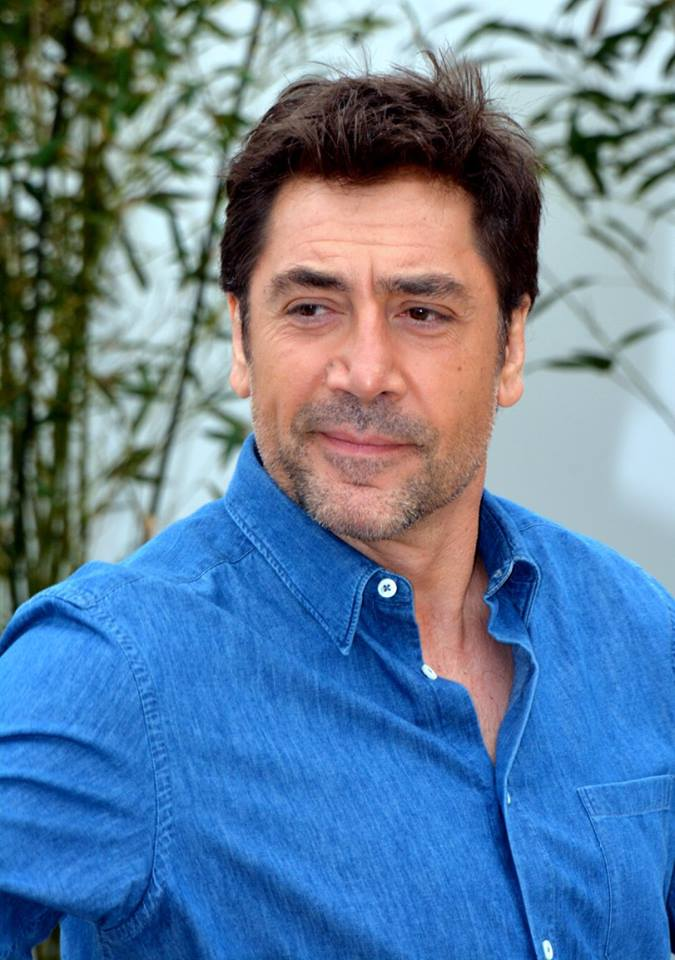
Javier Bardem won twice for Before Night Falls (2000), and The Sea Inside (2004)

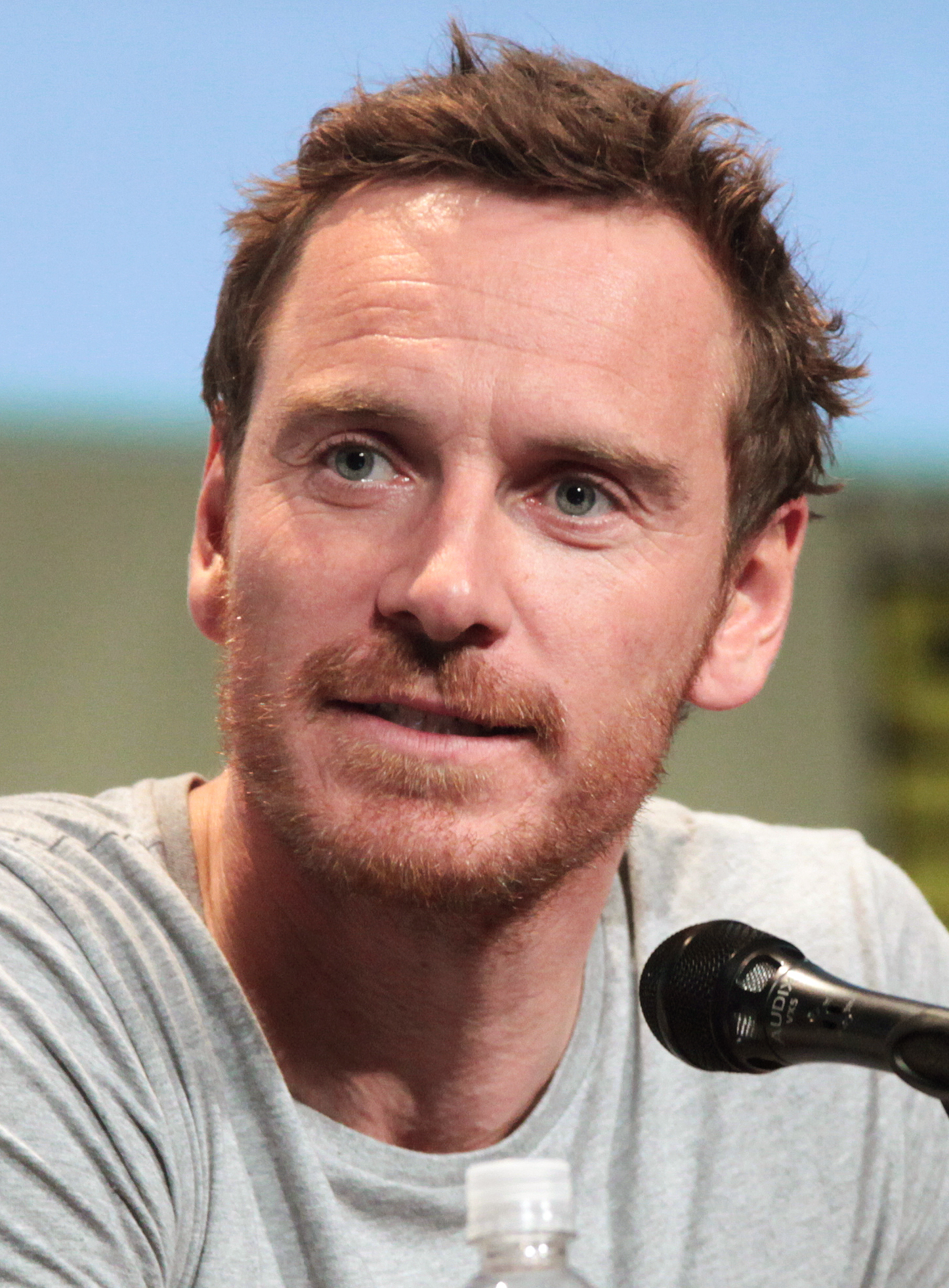
Michael Fassbender won for Shame (2011)

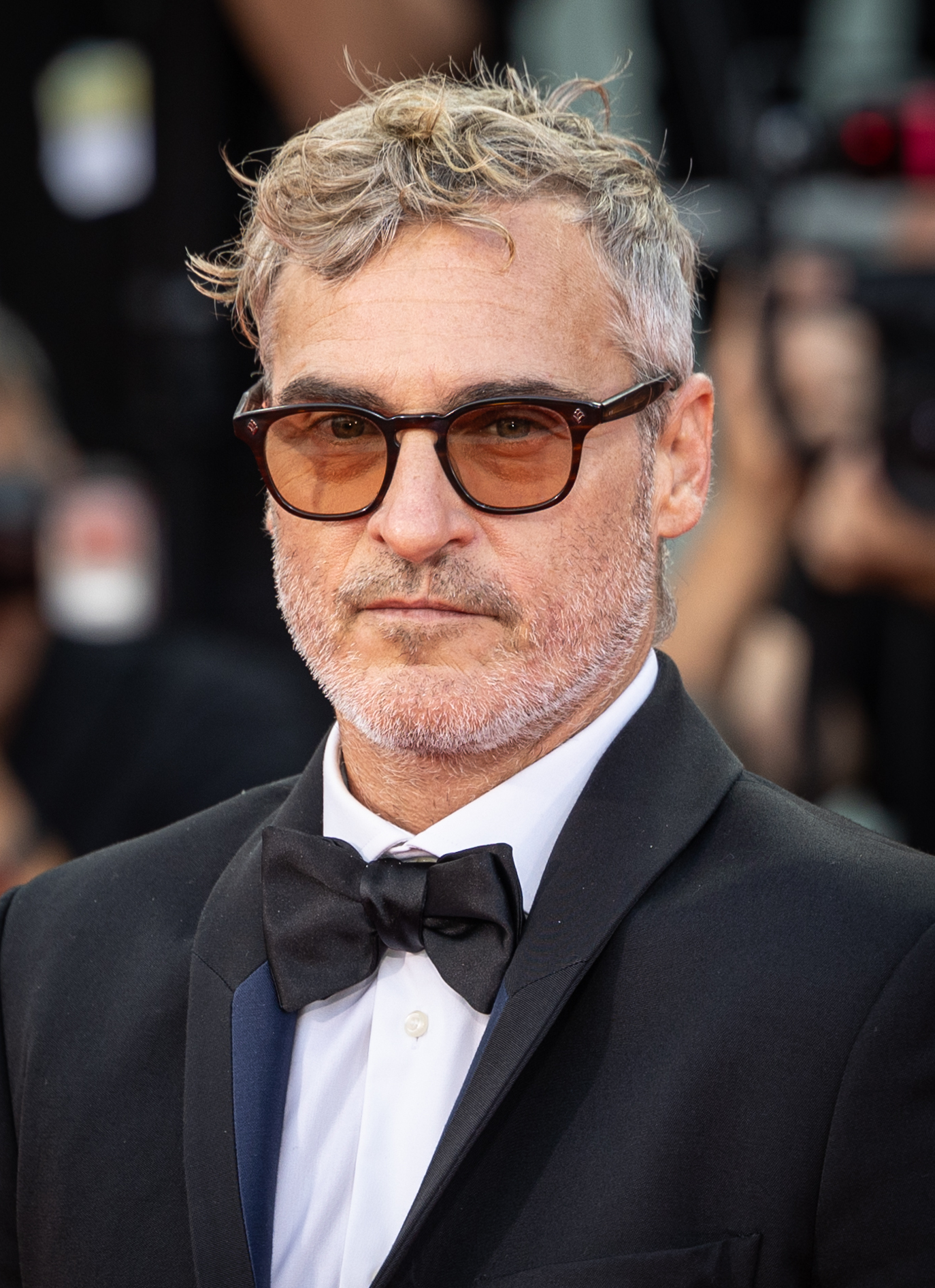
Joaquin Phoenix won for The Master (2012)

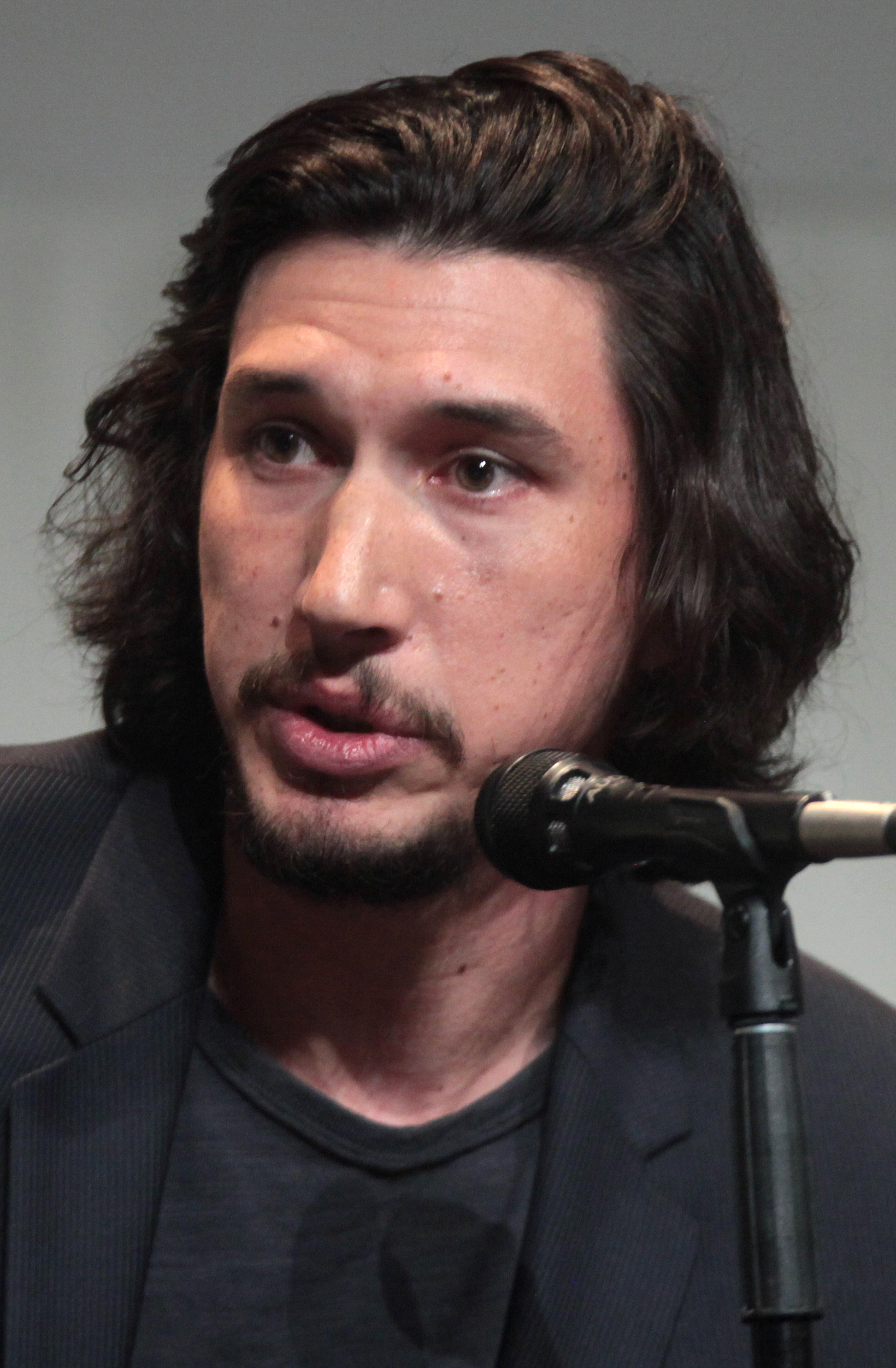
Adam Driver won for Hungry Hearts (2014)

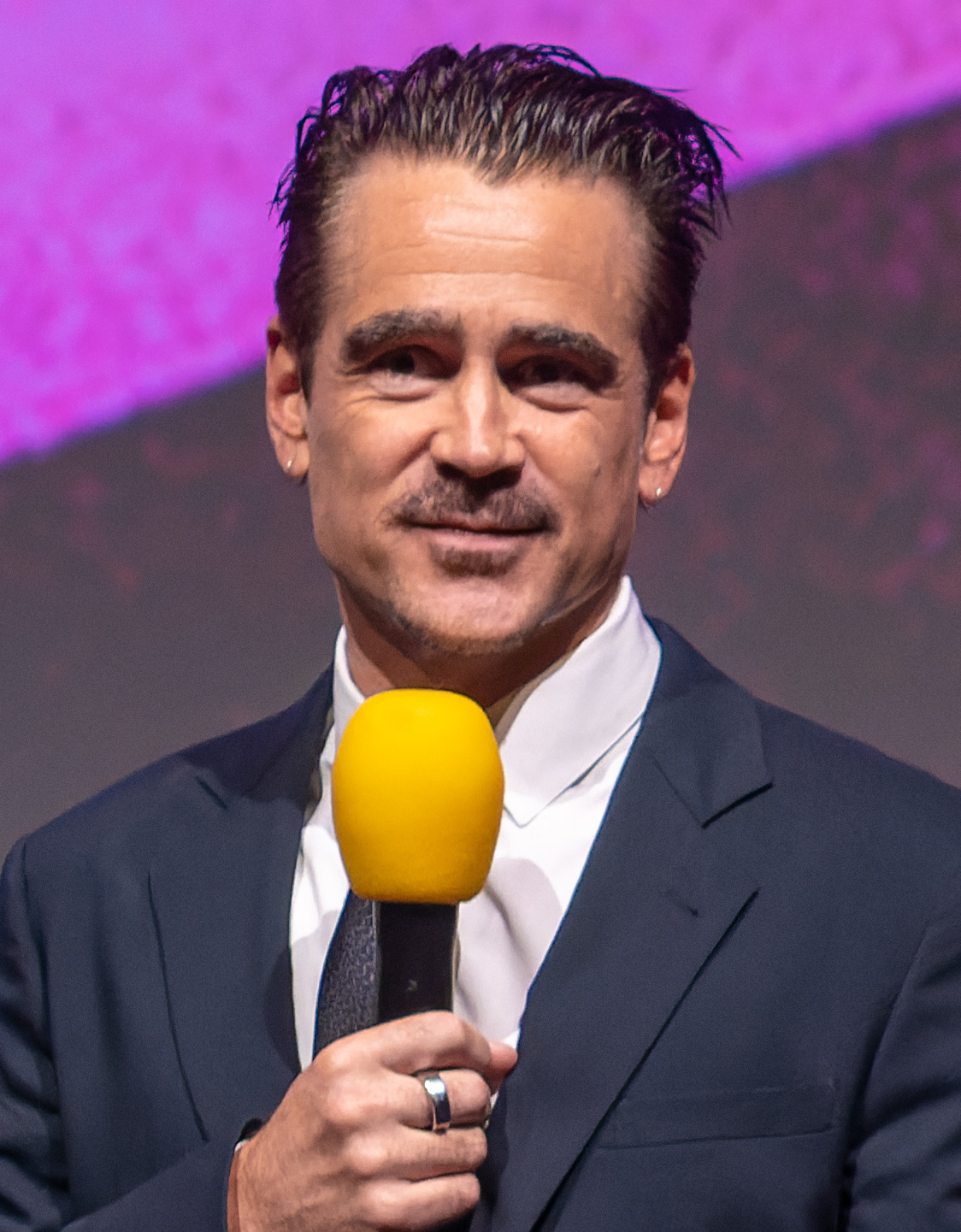
Colin Farrell won for The Banshees of Inisherin (2022)

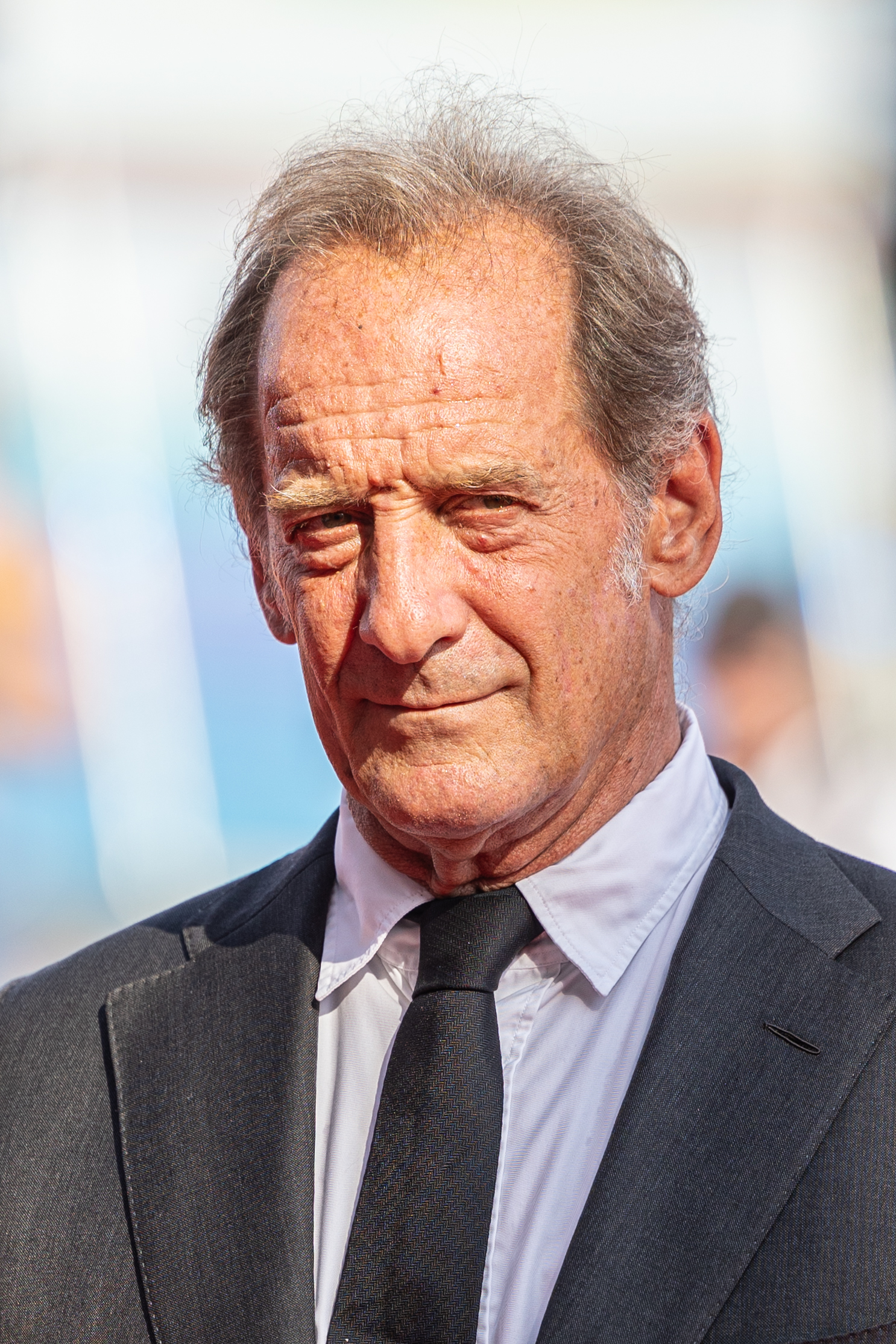
Vincent Lindon won for The Quiet Son (2024)

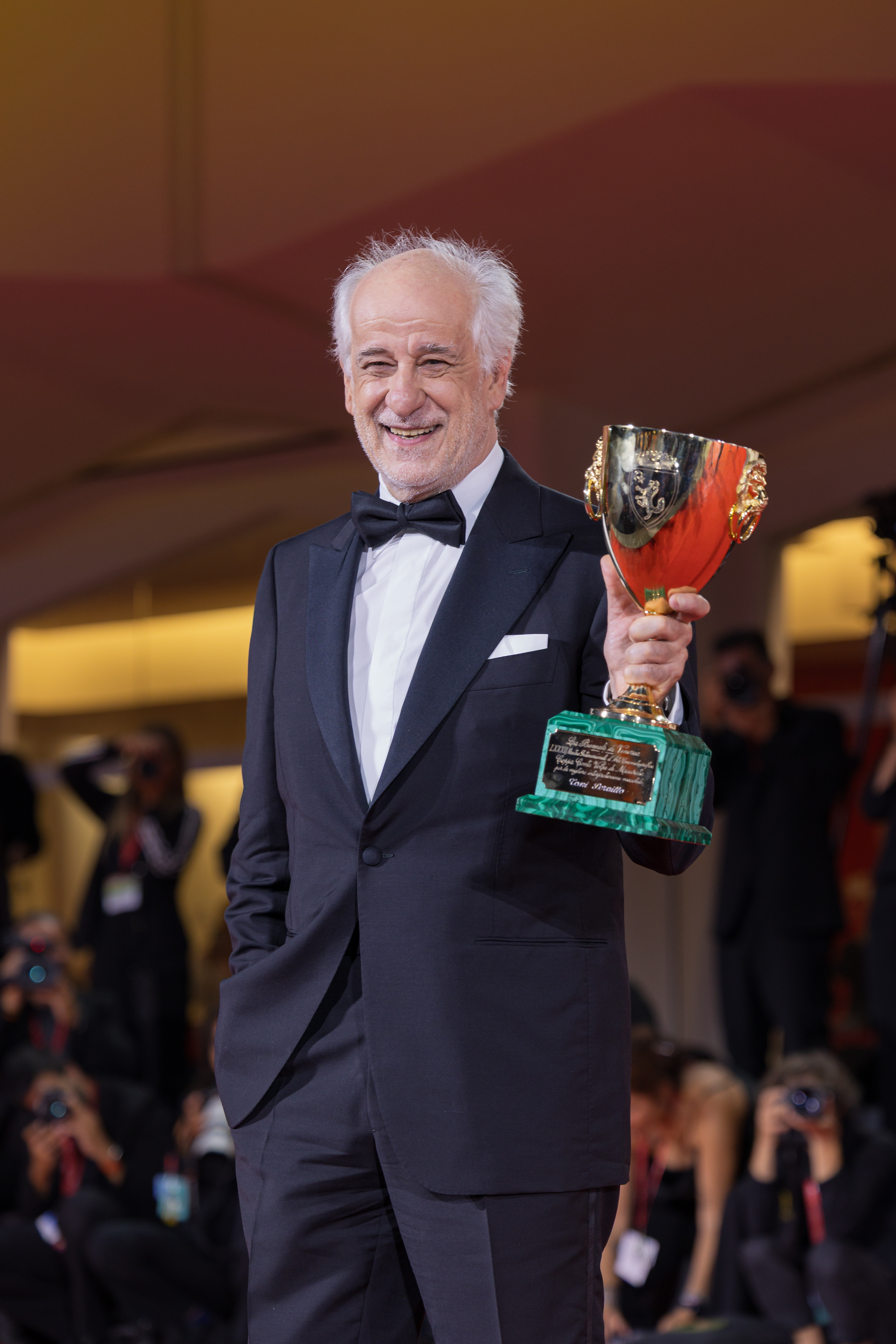
Toni Servillo won for La grazia (2025)

The following actors received the Volpi Cup or other major Best Actor Award:

Table key
‡	Indicates the Best Supporting Actor winner

=== 1930s ===
Year	Actor	Role(s)	English Title	Original Title	Ref.
Awarded as "Best Actor"					
1932	Fredric March^{[A]}	Dr. Henry Jekyll / Mr. Edward Hyde	Dr. Jekyll and Mr. Hyde		
Awarded as "Great Gold Medal of the National Fascist Association for Entertainment for Best Actor"
1934	Wallace Beery	Pancho Villa	Viva Villa!		
Awarded as "Volpi Cup for Best Actor"
1935	Pierre Blanchar	Rodion Raskolnikov	Crime and Punishment	Crime et châtiment	
1936	Paul Muni	Louis Pasteur	The Story of Louis Pasteur		
1937	Emil Jannings	Matthias Clausen	The Ruler	Der Herrscher	
1938	Leslie Howard	Professor Henry Higgins	Pygmalion		

=== 1940s ===
Year	Actor	Role(s)	English Title	Original Title	Ref.
1941	Ermete Zacconi	Don Geronimo Buonaparte	Don Buonaparte		
1942	Fosco Giachetti	Captain Enrico Berti	Bengasi		
Awarded as "International Award for Best Actor"
1947	Pierre Fresnay	Vincent de Paul	Monsieur Vincent		
1948	Ernst Deutsch	Scharf	The Trial	Der Prozeß	
1949	Joseph Cotten	Eben Adams	Portrait of Jennie		

=== 1950s ===
Year	Actor	Role(s)	English Title	Original Title	Ref.
1950	Sam Jaffe	Erwin "Doc" Riedenschneider	The Asphalt Jungle		
Awarded as "Volpi Cup for Best Actor"
1951	Jean Gabin	Raymond Pinsard	The Night Is My Kingdom	La nuit est mon royaume	
1952	Fredric March	Willy Loman	Death of a Salesman		
1953	Henri Vilbert	François Dupont	Good Lord Without Confession	Le Bon Dieu sans confession	
1954	Jean Gabin ^{[B]}	Victor Le Garrec	The Air of Paris	L'air de Paris	
1954	Jean Gabin ^{[B]}	Max	Honour Among Thieves	Touchez pas au grisbi	
1955	Curd Jürgens	Wolf Gerke	The Heroes Are Tired	Les héros sont fatigués	
1955	Kenneth More	Freddie Page	The Deep Blue Sea		
1956	Bourvil	Marcel Martin	La Traversée de Paris		
1957	Anthony Franciosa	Polo Pope	A Hatful of Rain		
1958	Alec Guinness	Gulley Jimson	The Horse's Mouth		
1959	James Stewart	Paul Biegler	Anatomy of a Murder		

=== 1960s ===
Year	Actor	Role(s)	English Title	Original Title	Ref.
1960	John Mills	Lt. Col. Basil Barrow	Tunes of Glory		
1961	Toshiro Mifune	Sanjuro	Yojimbo	用心棒	
1962	Burt Lancaster	Robert Stroud	Birdman of Alcatraz		
1963	Albert Finney	Tom Jones	Tom Jones		
1964	Tom Courtenay	Private Arthur Hamp	King and Country		
1965	Toshiro Mifune	Dr. Kyojō Niide	Red Beard	赤ひげ	
1966	Jacques Perrin	Michele	Almost a Man	Un uomo a metà	
1967	Ljubiša Samardžić	Mali	The Morning	Jutro	
1968	John Marley	Richard Forst	Faces		

=== 1980s ===
Year	Actor	Role(s)	English Title	Original Title	Ref.
Awarded as "Best Actor Award"
1983	Guy Boyd	Rooney	Streamers		
1983	George Dzundza	Cokes	Streamers		
1983	David Alan Grier	Roger	Streamers		
1983	Mitchell Lichtenstein	Richie	Streamers		
1983	Matthew Modine	Billy	Streamers		
1983	Michael Wright	Carlyle	Streamers		
1984	Naseeruddin Shah	Naurangia	Paar		
1985	Gérard Depardieu	Louis Vincent Mangin	Police		
1986	Carlo Delle Piane	Antonio Sant'Elia	Christmas Present	Regalo di Natale	
1987	Hugh Grant	Clive Durham	Maurice		
1987	James Wilby	Maurice Hall	Maurice		
Awarded as "Volpi Cup for Best Actor"
1988	Don Ameche	Gino	Things Change		
1988	Joe Mantegna	Jerry	Things Change		
1989	Marcello Mastroianni	Marcello	What Time Is It?	Che ora è?	
1989	Massimo Troisi	Michele	What Time Is It?	Che ora è?	

=== 1990s ===
Year	Actor	Role(s)	English Title	Original Title	Ref.
1990	Oleg Borisov	Christo Panov / Svidetel	The Only Witness	Edinstveniyat svidetel	
1991	River Phoenix	Mikey Waters	My Own Private Idaho		
1992	Jack Lemmon	Shelley "The Machine" Levene	Glengarry Glen Ross		
1993	Fabrizio Bentivoglio	Pietro De Leo	A Soul Split in Two	Un'anima divisa in due	
1993	Marcello Mastroianni ‡	Constantin Laspada	1, 2, 3, Sun	Un, deux, trois, soleil	
1994	Xia Yu	Ma Xiaojun	In the Heat of the Sun	陽光燦爛的日子	
1994	Roberto Citran ‡	Loris	The Bull	Il toro	
1995	Götz George	Fritz Haarmann	Deathmaker	Der Totmacher	
1995	Ian Hart ‡	Ginger	Nothing Personal		
1996	Liam Neeson	Michael Collins	Michael Collins		
1996	Chris Penn ‡	Cesarian "Chez" Tempio	The Funeral		
1997	Wesley Snipes	Max Carlyle	One Night Stand		
1998	Sean Penn	Eddie	Hurlyburly		
1999	Jim Broadbent	W. S. Gilbert	Topsy-Turvy		

=== 2000s ===
Year	Actor	Role(s)	English Title	Original Title	Ref.
2000	Javier Bardem	Reinaldo Arenas	Before Night Falls		
2001	Luigi Lo Cascio	Antonio	Light of My Eyes	Luce dei miei occhi	
2002	Stefano Accorsi	Dino Campana	A Journey Called Love	Un viaggio chiamato amore	
2003	Sean Penn	Paul Rivers	21 Grams		
2004	Javier Bardem	Ramón Sampedro	The Sea Inside	Mar adentro	
2005	David Strathairn	Edward R. Murrow	Good Night, and Good Luck		
2006	Ben Affleck	George Reeves	Hollywoodland		
2007	Brad Pitt	Jesse James	The Assassination of Jesse James by the Coward Robert Ford		
2008	Silvio Orlando	Michele Casali	Giovanna's Father	Il papà di Giovanna	
2009	Colin Firth	George Falconer	A Single Man		

=== 2010s ===
Year	Actor	Role(s)	English Title	Original Title	Ref.
2010	Vincent Gallo	Mohammed	Essential Killing		
2011	Michael Fassbender	Brandon Sullivan	Shame		
2012	Philip Seymour Hoffman	Lancaster Dodd	The Master		
2012	Joaquin Phoenix	Freddie Quell	The Master		
2013	Themis Panou	Father	Miss Violence		
2014	Adam Driver	Jude	Hungry Hearts		
2015	Fabrice Luchini	Michel Racine	Courted	L'Hermine	
2016	Oscar Martínez	Daniel Mantovani	The Distinguished Citizen	El ciudadano ilustre	
2017	Kamel El Basha	Yasser Abdallah Salameh	The Insult	قضية رقم ٢٣	
2018	Willem Dafoe	Vincent van Gogh	At Eternity's Gate		
2019	Luca Marinelli	Martin Eden	Martin Eden		

=== 2020s ===
Year	Actor	Role(s)	English Title	Original Title	Ref.
2020	Pierfrancesco Favino	Alfonso	Padrenostro		
2021	John Arcilla	Sisoy Salas	On the Job: The Missing 8		
2022	Colin Farrell	Pádraic Súilleabháin	The Banshees of Inisherin		
2023	Peter Sarsgaard	Saul	Memory		
2024	Vincent Lindon	Pierre	The Quiet Son	Jouer avec le feu	
2025	Toni Servillo	President Mariano De Santis	La grazia		
2026	John Malkovich	Chris	Wild Horse Nine		

== Multiple winners ==
The following individuals have received multiple Best Actor awards:

Number of Wins	Actor	Nationality	Films
2	Fredric March	United States	Dr. Jekyll and Mr. Hyde (1932), Death of a Salesman (1952)
2	Jean Gabin	France	The Night Is My Kingdom (1951), The Air of Paris & Touchez pas au grisbi (both 1954)
2	Toshiro Mifune	Japan	Yojimbo (1961), Red Beard (1965)
2	Marcello Mastroianni	Italy	What Time Is It? (1989), 1, 2, 3, Sun (1993)
2	Sean Penn	United States	Hurlyburly (1998), 21 Grams (2003)
2	Javier Bardem	Spain	Before Night Falls (2000), The Sea Inside (2004)

== See also ==
The following individuals have also received Best Actor award(s) at Cannes or Berlin Film Festival.

Winning Year at Venice	Actor	Nationality	Festival	Year	English Title
1932; 1952	Fredric March	United States	Berlin	1960	Inherit The Wind
1951; 1954	Jean Gabin	France	Berlin	1959	Archimède le clochard
1951; 1954	Jean Gabin	France	Berlin	1971	Le Chat
1959	James Stewart	United States	Berlin	1962	Mr. Hobbs Takes a Vacation
1962	Burt Lancaster	United States	Berlin	1956	Trapeze
1963	Albert Finney	England	Berlin	1984	The Dresser
1964	Tom Courtenay	England	Berlin	2015	45 Years
1985	Gérard Depardieu	France	Cannes	1990	Cyrano de Bergerac
1989; 1993	Marcello Mastroianni	Italy	Cannes	1970	The Pizza Triangle
1989; 1993	Marcello Mastroianni	Italy	Cannes	1987	Dark Eyes
1992	Jack Lemmon	United States	Cannes	1979	The China Syndrome
1992	Jack Lemmon	United States	Berlin	1981	Tribute
1992	Jack Lemmon	United States	Cannes	1982	Missing
1998; 2003	Sean Penn	United States	Berlin	1996	Dead Man Walking
1998; 2003	Sean Penn	United States	Cannes	1997	She's So Lovely
2000; 2004	Javier Bardem	Spain	Cannes	2010	Biutiful
2012	Joaquin Phoenix	United States	Cannes	2017	You Were Never Really Here
2024	Vincent Lindon	France	Cannes	2015	The Measure of a Man

== Notes ==
A: Winner of the award was chosen by public voting.
B: Performer to receive a single award which honor the outstanding work in multiple different films in the same official competition slate.
