= Mademoiselle Chambon =

- Directed by: Stéphane Brizé
- Written by: Stéphane Brizé; Florence Vignon
- Produced by: Gilles Sacuto; Miléna Poylo
- Starring: Vincent Lindon; Sandrine Kiberlain; Aure Atika; Jean-Marc Thibault
- Cinematography: Antoine Héberlé
- Edited by: Anne Klotz
- Music by: Ange Ghinozzi
- Distributed by: Rézo Films
- Release date: 2009
- Running time: 101 minutes
- Country: France
- Language: French
- Budget: $4 million
- Box office: $5.5 million

Mademoiselle Chambon is a 2009 French film directed by Stéphane Brizé, with a screenplay adapted from the 1996 novel by Éric Holder. It won a César Award for Best Adaptation.

== Plot ==
Jean is a builder in a town in the south of France where he lives happily with his wife and little son and keeps an eye on his old father. Fetching his boy from school one afternoon when his wife is unwell, he meets the class teacher. This is Véronique, a cultured but lonely woman who has little contact with her family and is always on the move, filling in for maternity leave. She asks him who in town could mend her window and he replaces it for her. At his request, she plays her violin for him and for a minute on the sofa they share a caress and a kiss. He recovers himself and goes home to his wife, but broods over this beautiful and available woman. She too yearns for the warm and uncomplicated masculinity of the builder. Moved by her music, he asks her to play at his father's birthday, takes her home afterwards, and spends the night with her. Next day, she packs up and leaves town. He follows her taxi to the railway station, where she waits on the platform hoping he will appear. He waits in the tunnel below until the train moves off, when he recovers himself and goes home to his wife.

== Cast ==
- Sandrine Kiberlain as Véronique Chambon
- Vincent Lindon as Jean
- Aure Atika as Anne-Marie, wife of Jean
- Jean-Marc Thibault as Father of Jean
- Bruno Lochet as Jean's Colleague
- Geneviève Mnich as Véronique's mother

== Critical response ==
British film critic Mark Kermode praised the film and the performances of the lead actors. "Should he abandon the wife with whom he has built a home to pursue a fleeting dream inspired in part by the strange reverie of Elgar's Salut d'Amour? Eloquently adapted from Eric Holder's novel, this low-key, César-winning gem relies on tiny gestures – a glance, a wry smile, a longing look – to suggest great passion and inner turmoil, all conjured with wit, grace and honesty by Lindon and Kiberlain. Comparing any movie with Brief Encounter is always going to end in tears – Yet director Stéphane Brizé's quietly tremendous Mademoiselle Chambon does a pretty good job of reminding us that in terms of tragic romantic clout, less is often more."

== Awards and nominations ==
The film was nominated for the Independent Spirit Award for Best Foreign Film in 2010.

It was awarded a César Award for Best Adaptation.
