= At War =

2018 film

- Film poster
- Directed by: Stéphane Brizé
- Starring: Vincent Lindon
- Release date: 15 May 2018 (Cannes)
- Running time: 105 minutes
- Country: France
- Language: French

At War (French: En Guerre) is a 2018 French drama film directed by Stéphane Brizé. It was selected to compete for the Palme d'Or at the 2018 Cannes Film Festival.

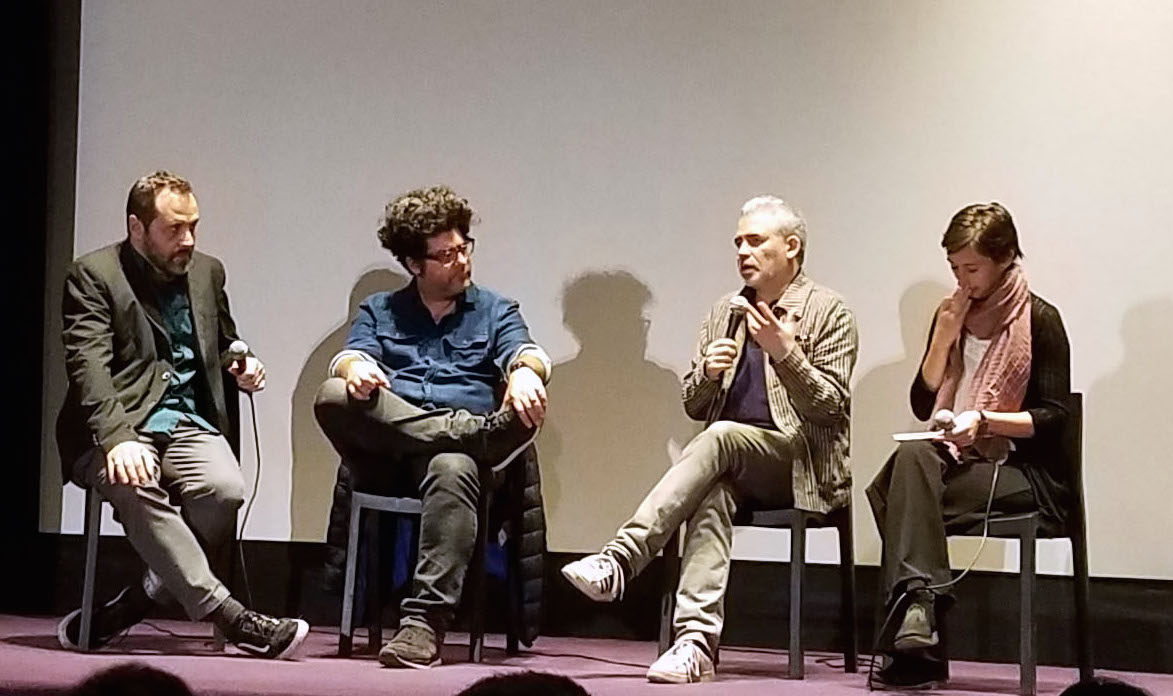
Stéphane Brizé (second from the right) in Buenos Aires in 2019, talking about 'La Loi du marché' and 'En Guerre'.

The film gained acclaim for its portrayal of working people.

== Plot ==
After promising 1,100 employees that they would protect their jobs, the managers of a French factory that has been bought by Germans, decide to suddenly shut down the plant. Laurent, a worker at the factory, takes the lead in a fight against this decision.

== Cast ==
- Vincent Lindon as Eric Laurent

== Reception ==
On the review aggregator Rotten Tomatoes, the film has an approval rating of 70% based on 33 reviews, with an average rating of 6/10. The website's critical consensus reads: "At War doesn't have the answers to the struggles it highlights, but proves no less compelling in the raw urgency with which it depicts the modern worker's plight." On Metacritic, the film has a score of 61 out of 100, based on 12 critics, indicating "generally favorable reviews".
