= Vincent Lindon =

French actor and filmmaker (born 1959)

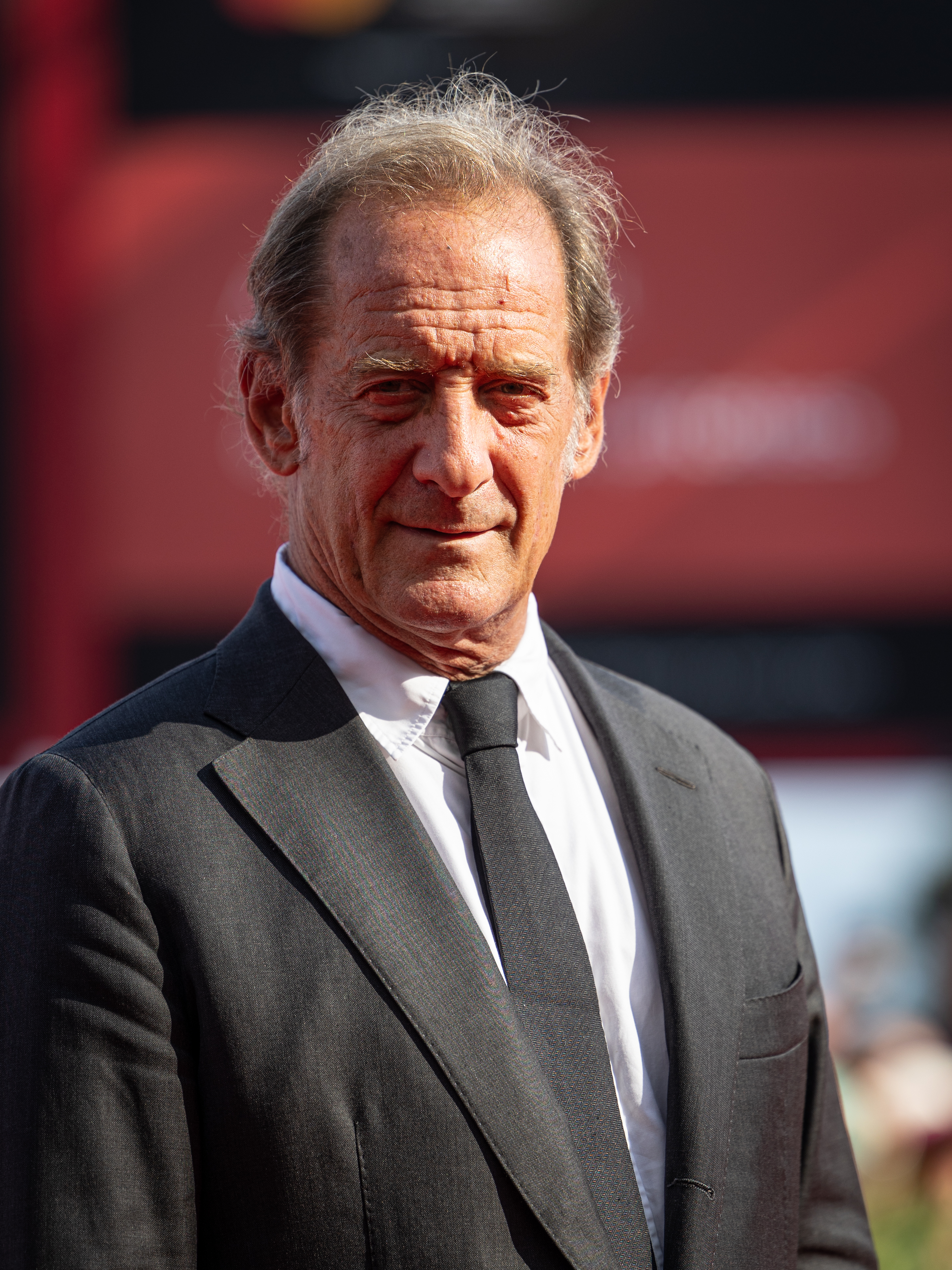
- Lindon in 2024
- Born: 15 July 1959 (age 67); Boulogne-Billancourt, Hauts-de-Seine, France
- Occupations: Actor, director, screenwriter
- Years active: 1983–present
- Spouse: Sandrine Kiberlain (m. 1998; div. 2003)
- Children: 2, including Suzanne
- Relatives: Pierre Bénichou (stepfather)

Vincent Lindon (French pronunciation: [vɛ̃sɑ̃ lɛ̃dɔ̃]; born 15 July 1959) is a French actor and filmmaker. For his role in the film The Measure of a Man (2015), Lindon won Best Actor at the 2015 Cannes Film Festival, Best Actor at the 41st César Awards and the IFFI Best Actor Award (Male) at the 46th International Film Festival of India.

Lindon was selected as the president of the jury for the main competition section of the 2022 Cannes Film Festival.

In 2024, Lindon was awarded the Volpi Cup for Best Actor at the Venice International Film Festival for his lead role in The Quiet Son.

== Early life and education ==
Vincent Lindon is the son of Laurent Lindon, who was director of the company Audioline. He is the grandson of Raymond Lindon, who served as the magistrate and mayor of Étretat between 1929 and 1959, as well as the nephew of Jérôme Lindon, director of Les Éditions de Minuit. He is also the great-grandson of Fernande Citroën, the older sister of André Citroën and wife of Alfred Lindon (born Abner Lindenbaum), a Jewish jeweler and modern art collector originally from Kraków, Poland. Through his mother, Alix Dufaure, a journalist for Marie Claire, Lindon is a descendant of French Prime minister Jules Dufaure and Marshal Rémy Joseph Isidore Exelmans.

Lindon completed studies at the Lycée Victor-Duruy, where he obtained a baccalauréat scientifique. He then enrolled in an école supérieure de commerce, but lost interest in his studies after 22 days. In 1979, his mother secured an internship for him as a costume design assistant on the set of Alain Resnais' film My American Uncle (1980), on which he worked with actor Gérard Depardieu. He then spent six months in New York working as an assistant in charge of radio promotion with his uncle, Eric Dufaure, founder of the label Cachalot Records (Ian North, Die Hausfrauen, Medium Medium, Malaria, Stars of the Streets, Comateens, Made in France, Personal Effects). When he returned to Paris, his father-in-law Pierre Bénichou secured a position for him managing the microphones for the tour of comedian Coluche in 1981. He was also a courier for the newspaper Le Matin de Paris before entering the Cours Florent drama school.

== Career ==
Since 1980, Vincent Lindon has worked with renowned film directors Claude Sautet, Claude Lelouch, Coline Serreau, Bertrand Blier, Claire Denis, Emmanuel Carrère, Nicole Garcia, Stéphane Brizé, Jacques Doillon, Xavier Giannoli, Julia Ducournau, Alain Cavalier, Mathieu Kassovitz, Benoît Jacquot, Jean-Jacques Beineix, Diane Kurys, Claude Pinoteau, Pierre Jolivet.

In 2005, he won the Swann d'Or for best actor at the Cabourg Film Festival for La Moustache by Emmanuel Carrère.

In 2013, he chaired the jury of the 39th Deauville American Film Festival.

In 2015, he earned the Best Actor Award at the 68th Cannes Film Festival and then the César Award for Best Actor at the 41st ceremony for the film The Measure of a Man directed by Stéphane Brizé.

In May 2022, he was appointed as president of the jury for the 75th edition of the Cannes Film Festival, succeeding Spike Lee.

In 2024, he starred in the film Le Deuxième Acte directed by Quentin Dupieux, which was the opening film for the 77th edition of the Cannes Film Festival

Lindon was also awarded the Volpi Cup for Best Actor at the 2024 Venice Film Festival for his lead role in The Quiet Son.

== Personal life ==
In the 1980s, Lindon was in a relationship with Claude Chirac, daughter of President Jacques Chirac, for nearly ten years. Lindon later had a highly publicised relationship with Caroline, Princess of Monaco. Lindon has a son, Marcel, born in 1996. He married actress Sandrine Kiberlain in 1998, with whom he has a daughter, Suzanne, born in 2000. The couple met in 1993 on the set of the film L'Irrésolu (1994). They separated in 2003. Lindon later dated Chiara Mastroianni after playing the love interest of her mother Catherine Deneuve in Belle maman.

== Selected filmography ==
Key
†	Denotes films that have not yet been released

Year	Title avec amour et acharnement	Role Jean	Notes
1982	Guy de Maupassant	Un mec sur la plage	Uncredited
1983	Le Faucon	the inspector	
1984	L'Addition	Magnum	
1984	Notre histoire	Brechet	
1985	Parole de flic	Dax	
1986	Betty Blue	Richard	
1986	Suivez mon regard	a scoundrel	
1986	Prunelle Blues	Fernand	
1986	Half Moon Street	Sonny	
1986	Yiddish Connection	Zvi	
1987	Dernier été à Tanger	Roland Barrès	
1987	A Man in Love	Bruno Schlosser	
1988	Quelques jours avec moi	Fernand	
1988	L'Étudiante	Ned	
1990	La Baule-les-Pins	Jean-Claude	
1990	Il y a des jours... et des lunes	The innkeeper	
1990	Gaspard et Robinson	Robinson	
1991	Netchaïev est de retour	Daniel Laurencon / Netchaiev	
1991	La Cabine		Short
1992	La Belle Histoire	Simon Choulel	
1992	La Crise	Victor Barelle	
1993	Tout ça... pour ça !	Lino	
1994	L'Irrésolu	François	
1995	La Haine	A very drunk man	
1996	Vite strozzate	Francesco	
1996	Les Victimes	Pierre Duval	
1996	La Belle Verte	Max	
1997	Fred	Fred	
1997	Seventh Heaven	Nico	
1998	Paparazzi	Michel Verdier	
1998	The School of Flesh	Chris	
1999	Belle maman	Antoine	
1999	My Little Business	Ivan Lansi	
1999	Pas de scandale	Louis Jeancourt	
2001	Mercredi, folle journée!	Martin Socoa	
2001	Chaos	Paul	
2002	Le Frère du guerrier	Thomas	
2002	Vendredi soir	Jean	
2003	Sole Sisters	Bruno	
2003	The Cost of Living	Coway	
2003	Les Clefs de bagnole	the actor who refuses to work with Laurent	
2004	La Confiance règne	Christophe Gérard	
2005	The Moustache	Marc Thiriez	
2005	L'Avion	Pierre	
2006	Charlie Says	Serge	
2007	Je crois que je l'aime	Lucas	
2007	Ceux qui restent	Bertrand Liévain	
2008	London mon amour	Mathias	
2008	Chasseurs de dragons	Lian-Chu	French version, voice
2008	Anything for Her	Julien Auclert	
2009	Welcome	Simon Calmat	
2009	Mademoiselle Chambon	Jean	
2011	Un coeur qui bat	The narrator	Television film
2011	La permission de minuit	David	
2011	Pater	Vincent Lindon	
2011	All Our Desires	Stéphane	
2011	Complices	Vincent Lindon	Video short
2012	Augustine	Professeur Jean-Martin Charcot	
2012	A Few Hours of Spring	Alain Évrard	
2013	Bastards	Marco Silvestri	
2014	Mea Culpa	Simon	
2015	Diary of a Chambermaid	Joseph	
2015	The Measure of a Man	Thierry Taugourdeau	
2015	The Little Prince	Businessman	French version, voice
2015	The White Knights	Jacques Arnault	
2017	Rodin	Auguste Rodin	
2018	Isle of Dogs	Chief	French version, voice
2018	The Apparition	Jacques Mayano	
2018	At War	Laurent Amédéo	
2019	Casanova, Last Love	Casanova	
2021	Titane	Vincent Legrand	
2021	Another World	Philippe Lemesle	
2021	Enquête sur un scandale d'État	Jacques Billard	
2022	Both Sides of the Blade	Jean	
2023	Of Money and Blood	Simon Weynachter	Television series
2024	The Second Act	Guillaume	
2024	The Quiet Son	Pierre	
2026	Les Misérables	Jean Valjean	
TBA	The Entertainment System Is Down †		Post-production

== Awards and nominations ==
Year	Association	Category	Work	Result	Ref
1993	César Awards	Best Actor	La Crise	Nominated	
2000	César Awards	Best Actor	My Little Business	Nominated	
2005	Cabourg Film Festival	Best Actor	La Moustache	Won	
2008	César Awards	Best Actor	Those Who Remain	Nominated	
2008	Globe de Cristal Awards	Best Actor	Those Who Remain	Nominated	
2010	César Awards	Best Actor	Welcome	Nominated	
2010	Globe de Cristal Awards	Best Actor	Welcome	Nominated	
2010	Lumière Awards	Best Actor	Welcome	Nominated	
2010	Silver Ribbon	European Silver Ribbon	Welcome	Won	
2013	César Awards	Best Actor	A Few Hours of Spring	Nominated	
2013	Globe de Cristal Awards	Best Actor	A Few Hours of Spring	Nominated	
2016	César Awards	Best Actor	The Measure of a Man	Won	
2016	Cannes Film Festival	Best Actor	The Measure of a Man	Won	
2016	European Film Awards	Best Actor	The Measure of a Man	Nominated	
2016	Lumière Awards	Best Actor	The Measure of a Man	Won	
2016	Lumière Awards	Best Actor	Diary of a Chambermaid	Won	
2019	Lumière Awards	Best Actor	At War	Nominated	
2021	DiscussingFilm Critic Awards	Best Supporting Actor	Titane	Won	
2021	European Film Awards	Best Actor	Titane	Nominated	
2021	Florida Film Critics Circle	Best Supporting Actor	Titane	Nominated	
2021	Los Angeles Film Critics Association	Best Supporting Actor	Titane	Won	
2022	Austin Film Critics Association	Best Supporting Actor	Titane	Nominated	
2022	Critics' Choice Super Awards	Best Actor in a Horror Movie	Titane	Nominated	
2022	Lumière Awards	Best Actor	Titane	Nominated	
2022	National Society of Film Critics	Best Supporting Actor	Titane	Nominated	
2022	Seattle Film Critics Society	Best Supporting Actor	Titane	Nominated	
2024	Venice Film Festival	Volpi Cup for Best Actor	The Quiet Son	Won	
