= Out of Season (2023 film) =

French film by Stéphane Brizé

- Theatrical release poster
- French: Hors-saison
- Directed by: Stéphane Brizé
- Written by: Stéphane Brizé; Marie Drucker
- Produced by: Sidonie Dumas
- Starring: Guillaume Canet; Alba Rohrwacher
- Cinematography: Antoine Heberlé
- Edited by: Anne Klotz
- Music by: Vincent Delerm
- Production companies: Gaumont; France 3 Cinéma; Caneo Films
- Distributed by: Gaumont
- Release dates: 8 September 2023 (Venice); 20 March 2024 (France)
- Running time: 115 minutes
- Country: France
- Language: French

Out of Season (French: Hors-saison, pronounced [ɔʁ sɛ.zɔ̃]) is a 2023 French romantic drama film directed by Stéphane Brizé, co-written with Marie Drucker. Starring Guillaume Canet and Alba Rohrwacher, it follows a former couple reconnecting their relationship after fifteen years.

The film had its world premiere at the main competition of the 80th Venice International Film Festival on 8 September 2023, where it competed for the Golden Lion. It was released theatrically in France by Gaumont on 20 March 2024.

== Plot ==
Mathieu, nearing fifty, is a well-known actor who lives in Paris. Alice is a forty-something piano teacher who lives in a small seaside town. They fell in love about fifteen years earlier, but then broke up. Time has passed, each of them went their separate ways. When Mathieu takes a holiday in the small resort town that Alice now lives in, they reconnect.

== Cast ==
- Guillaume Canet as Mathieu
- Alba Rohrwacher as Alice
- Sharif Andoura as Xavier
- Marie Drucker as Mathieu's wife
- Lucette Beudin as Lucette
- Emmy Boissard Paumelle as Emmy
- Hugo Dillon as Coach
- Johnny Rasse as Bird Singer #1
- Jean Boucault as Bird Singer #2

== Production ==
Out of Season was produced by Sidonie Dumas for Gaumont, in co-production with France 3 Cinéma and Caneo Films. Principal photography was scheduled to take place between 6 March and 21 April 2023, on location in Morbihan (Brittany). Filming took place on the Quiberon peninsula, including in Portivy and Pointe du Percho (both located in Saint-Pierre-Quiberon). Further filming took place in the Pays Vannetais, including on the Rhuys Peninsula. Antoine Heberlé served as the director of photography.

== Release ==
Out of Season was selected to compete for the Golden Lion at the 80th Venice International Film Festival, where it had its world premiere on 8 September 2023.

The film was theatrically released in France by Gaumont on 20 March 2024.

== Reception ==
=== Critical response ===
On the review aggregator website Rotten Tomatoes, the film holds an approval rating of 93% based on 14 reviews, with an average rating of 7.8/10. Out of Season received an average rating of 3.4 out of 5 stars on the French website AlloCiné, based on 33 reviews.

=== Accolades ===
| Award | Date of ceremony | Category | Recipient(s) | Result | Ref. |
|---|---|---|---|---|---|
| Venice Film Festival | 9 September 2023 | Golden Lion | Stéphane Brizé | Nominated | |
