= The Quiet Son =

2024 French film directed by Delphine and Muriel Coulin

- French: Jouer avec le feu
- Directed by: Delphine Coulin; Muriel Coulin
- Screenplay by: Delphine Coulin; Muriel Coulin
- Based on: What You Need from the Night by Laurent Petitmangin
- Produced by: Olivier Delbosc; Marie Guillaumond
- Starring: Vincent Lindon; Benjamin Voisin
- Cinematography: Frédéric Noirhomme
- Edited by: Béatrice Herminie; Pierre Deschamps
- Music by: Pawel Mykietyn
- Production companies: Felicita Films; Curiosa Films
- Distributed by: Ad Vitam Distribution
- Release dates: 4 September 2024 (Venice); 22 January 2025 (France)
- Running time: 120 minutes
- Country: France
- Language: French
- Budget: €4.4 million
- Box office: $3.5 million

The Quiet Son (French: Jouer avec le feu, lit. 'Playing with fire') is a 2024 drama film written and directed by Delphine Coulin and Muriel Coulin, based on the novel What You Need from the Night by Laurent Petitmangin. It stars Vincent Lindon and Benjamin Voisin as a father and son separated by political ideology.

The film had its world premiere at the main competition of the 81st Venice International Film Festival on 4 September 2024, where Lindon won the Volpi Cup for Best Actor. It was theatrically released in France on 22 January 2025 by Ad Vitam.

== Premise ==
Pierre is the 50-year-old father of two sons. When the younger son, Louis, leaves home to attend the Sorbonne, the older son, Fus, becomes more withdrawn and takes an interest in far-right extremist ideas, testing familial bonds.

== Cast ==
- Vincent Lindon as Pierre
- Benjamin Voisin as Felix (Fus)
- Stefan Crepon as Louis
- Sophie Guillemin as Cathy
- Édouard Sulpice as Jérémy
- Arnaud Rebotini as Bernard

== Release ==
The Quiet Son was selected to premiere at the 2024 Venice International Film Festival. Prior to the festival, the film was acquired for international sales by the Playtime Group.

The film was released on French theaters on 22 January 2025 by Ad Vitam Distribution.
