= Another World (2021 film) =

2021 film

- Theatrical release poster
- French: Un autre monde
- Directed by: Stéphane Brizé
- Written by: Olivier Gorce; Stéphane Brizé
- Produced by: Christophe Rossignon; Philip Boëffard
- Starring: Sandrine Kiberlain; Vincent Lindon; Anthony Bajon; Marie Drucker
- Cinematography: Eric Dumont
- Edited by: Anne Klotz
- Music by: Camille Rocailleux
- Production companies: Nord-Ouest Films; France 3 Cinéma; Diaphana; Wild Bunch International; Canal+; Ciné+; France Télévisions
- Release dates: 10 September 2021 (Venice); 16 February 2022 (France)
- Running time: 96 minutes
- Country: France
- Language: French
- Budget: €4.2 million
- Box office: $2.8 million

Another World (French: Un autre monde) is a 2021 French drama film directed by Stéphane Brizé, and co-written with Olivier Gorce. Starring Vincent Lindon and Sandrine Kiberlain, it follows the troubled separation of an unhappy marriage.

The film had its world premiere at the main competition of the 78th Venice International Film Festival on 10 September 2021, where it competed for the Golden Lion. It was theatrically released in France on 16 February 2022.

== Synopsis ==
"An executive manager, his wife and his family, at the point when his professional choices are about to overturn all their lives. Philippe Lemesle and his wife are separating, their love irretrievably damaged by pressures of work. A successful executive in industrial conglomerate, Philippe no longer knows how to respond to the contradictory demands of his bosses. Yesterday they wanted a manager, today an enforcer. Now he must decide what his life really means."

== Cast ==
- Sandrine Kiberlain as Anne Lemesle
- Vincent Lindon as Philippe Lemesle
- Anthony Bajon as Lucas Lemesle
- Marie Drucker as Claire Bonnet-Guérin

== Release ==
The film premièred at the 78th Venice International Film Festival on 10 September 2021. It was first theatrically released in Spain on 13 May 2022.

== Reception ==
=== Box office ===
Another World grossed a worldwide total of $2.8 million.

=== Critical response ===
On review aggregator Rotten Tomatoes, the film holds an approval rating of 100% based on 9 reviews, with an average rating of 7.5/10. On Metacritic, it holds a score of 79 out of 100, based on 5 critics, indicating "generally favorable reviews".
