= Seventh Heaven (1997 film) =

- Film poster
- Directed by: Benoît Jacquot
- Written by: Benoît Jacquot; Jérôme Beaujour
- Produced by: Georges Benayoun; Philippe Carcassonne
- Starring: Sandrine Kiberlain; Vincent Lindon
- Cinematography: Romain Winding
- Edited by: Pascale Chavance
- Release dates: 28 August 1997 (VIFF); 17 December 1997 (France)
- Running time: 88 minutes
- Country: France
- Language: French
- Budget: $2.7 million
- Box office: $2 million

Seventh Heaven (French: Le Septième Ciel) is a 1997 French drama film directed by Benoît Jacquot.

== Cast ==
- Sandrine Kiberlain - Mathilde
- Vincent Lindon - Nico
- François Berléand - The doctor
- Francine Bergé - Mathilde's mother
- Pierre Cassignard - Étienne
- Florence Loiret Caille - Chloé
- Eriq Ebouaney
