= Sole Sisters =

- Sole Sisters film poster
- Directed by: Pierre Jolivet
- Written by: Pierre Jolivet; Simon Michaël
- Produced by: Alain Sarde
- Starring: Sandrine Kiberlain; Sylvie Testud; Vincent Lindon
- Cinematography: Pascal Ridao
- Music by: Serge Perathoner; Jannick Top
- Distributed by: BAC Films
- Release date: 11 June 2003 (France)
- Running time: 85 minutes
- Country: France
- Language: French
- Budget: $5.2 million
- Box office: $1.9 million

Sole Sisters, a.k.a. Only Girls (French title: Filles uniques), is a 2003 film directed by Pierre Jolivet.

== Main cast ==
- Sandrine Kiberlain – Carole
- Sylvie Testud – Tina
- Vincent Lindon – Adrien
- François Berléand – Mermot

== Plot ==
Carole, a Parisian judge, meets Tina, a thief who has been arrested twice for shoplifting expensive shoes.
