= My Father's Guests =

2010 French film directed by Anne Le Ny

- Theatrical release poster
- French: Les Invités de mon père
- Directed by: Anne Le Ny
- Written by: Anne Le Ny; Luc Béraud
- Produced by: Bruno Levy
- Starring: Karin Viard; Fabrice Luchini; Michel Aumont; Valérie Benguigui; Veronica Novak
- Cinematography: Patrick Blossier
- Edited by: Francine Sandberg
- Music by: Béatrice Thiriet
- Production company: Move Movie
- Distributed by: UGC Distribution
- Release date: 31 March 2010
- Running time: 100 minutes
- Country: France
- Language: French
- Budget: $6.8 million
- Box office: $5.9 million

My Father's Guests (French: Les Invités de mon père) is a 2010 French comedy film written, directed by, and starring Anne Le Ny, along with Karin Viard, Fabrice Luchini and Michel Aumont.

== Plot ==
Lucien Paumelle, retired physician, is a longtime activist (Resistance, abortion rights). By conviction, he decided to host a clandestine and her daughter from Moldova. But the relationship between Tatiana and Lucien Paumelle aren't well regarded by his children, Babette and Arnaud.

== Cast ==
- Karin Viard as Babette Paumelle
- Fabrice Luchini as Arnaud Paumelle
- Michel Aumont as Lucien Paumelle
- Valérie Benguigui as Karine Paumelle
- Veronica Novak as Tatiana
- Raphaël Personnaz as Carter
- Olivier Rabourdin as Rémy
- Flore Babled as Julie
- Max Renaudin Pratt as Simon
- Emma Siniavski as Sorina
- Benjamin Atlan as Théo
- Marie Agnès Brigot as Madame Delbard
- Cidalia Valente as Madame Da Silva
- Monique Couturier as Aunt Hélène
- Anne Le Ny as The woman in the car
