= Anne Le Ny =

French actress, screenwriter and film director (born 1962)

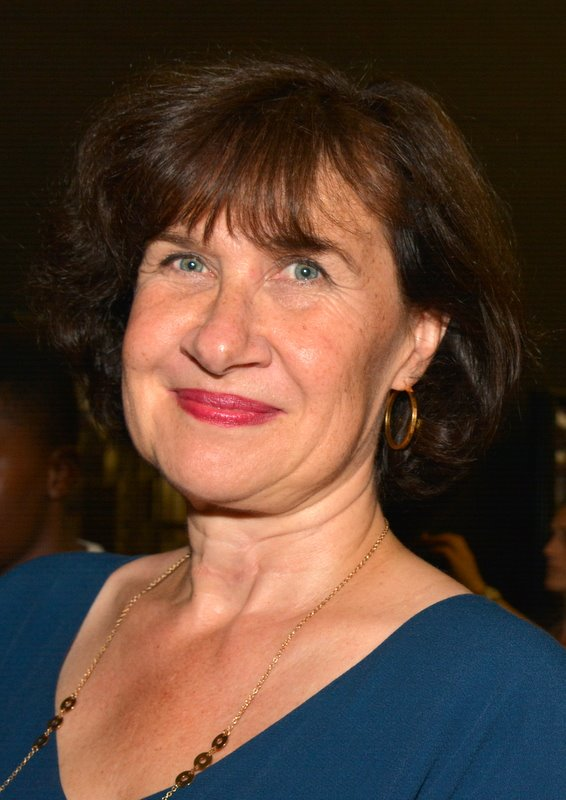
- Anne Le Ny in 2016
- Born: 16 December 1962 (age 63); Antony, Hauts-de-Seine, France
- Occupations: Actress, screenwriter, film director
- Years active: 1986–present

Anne Le Ny (French pronunciation: [an lə ni]; born 16 December 1962) is a French actress, screenwriter and film director.

== Theatre ==
Year	Title	Author	Director
1986–87	Les Acteurs de bonne foi La Méprise	Pierre de Marivaux	Philippe Adrien
1988–89	Le Cid	Pierre Corneille	Gérard Desarthe
1994	Du haut du ciel	Paul-Emmanuel Dubois	Paul-Emmanuel Dubois
1994	S.D.F. - S.M.B. - S.O.S.	Géraldine Bourgue	Géraldine Bourgue
1998	L’Amour en toutes lettres	Martine Sevegrand	Didier Ruiz
2001	Jardins barbares	Daniel Call	Pascale Siméon
2003	Marisol	José Rivera	Pascale Siméon
2005	Attempts on Her Life	Martin Crimp	Pascale Siméon
2008	Attempts on Her Life	Martin Crimp	Pascale Siméon

== Filmography ==
=== Cinema ===
Year	Title	Role	Director	Notes
1996	Passage à l'acte	Fabienne	Francis Girod	
1997	La méthode	Isabelle	Thomas Béguin	Short
1998	En plein coeur	Bordenave	Pierre Jolivet	
1998	Julie est amoureuse	Emilie Monk	Vincent Dietschy	
1999	My Little Business	Madame Chastaing	Pierre Jolivet	
1999	Alias	Cécilia	Marina de Van	Short
2000	Aïe	Marie	Sophie Fillières	
2000	Lise et André	Véronique	Denis Dercourt	
2000	The Taste of Others	Valérie	Agnès Jaoui	
2001	Day Off	Marie Pelloutier	Pascal Thomas	
2001	Vertiges de l'amour	The mayor	Laurent Chouchan	
2001	Voyance et manigance	Madame Clédes	Eric Fourniols	
2002	Beautiful Memories	Nathalie Poussin	Zabou Breitman	
2002	Le frère du guerrier	Madame de Moteron	Pierre Jolivet	
2002	Speak to Me of Love	Amélie	Sophie Marceau	
2003	Little Lili	Léone	Claude Miller	
2003	Le pacte du silence	The nun nurse	Graham Guit	
2003	Mes enfants ne sont pas comme les autres	The bourgeois	Denis Dercourt	
2005	Mon petit doigt m'a dit...	Alice Perry	Pascal Thomas	
2005	3 gouttes d'Antésite	Agathe	Karine Blanc & Michel Tavarès	Short
2006	My Best Friend	Casting woman	Patrice Leconte	
2006	Du jour au lendemain	Madame Delassus	Philippe Le Guay	
2007	Those Who Remain	Nathalie	Anne Le Ny	
2010	The Chameleon	Frédéric's Mother	Jean-Paul Salomé	
2010	My Father's Guests	Woman in the car	Anne Le Ny	
2011	Twiggy	Sonia	Emmanuelle Millet	
2011	The Intouchables	Yvonne	Éric Toledano and Olivier Nakache	
2011	Declaration of War	Doctor Fitoussi	Valérie Donzelli	
2011	Nobody Else But You	Victoria	Gérald Hustache-Mathieu	
2012	Cornouaille	The receptionist	Anne Le Ny	
2013	Suzanne	Madame Danvers	Katell Quillévéré	
2013	Attila Marcel	Madame Proust	Sylvain Chomet	
2013	Je fais le mort	Madame Jacky	Jean-Paul Salomé	
2014	Almost Friends	Nathalie Perusel	Anne Le Ny	
2015	Daddy or Mommy	The judge	Martin Bourboulon	
2016	Jailbirds	Marthe Brunet	Audrey Estrougo	
2016	Arctic Heart	Nadine	Marie Madinier	
2016	Daddy or Mommy 2	The judge	Martin Bourboulon	
2017	La confession	Christine Sangredin	Nicolas Boukhrief	
2018	La monnaie de leur pièce	The neighbor	Anne Le Ny	
2021	Stillwater	Leparq	Tom McCarthy	
2022	Le torrent	Capitaine Da Silva	Anne Le Ny	
2022	The Butcher's Daughter	Madame Keller	Christopher Thompson	
2025	Once Upon My Mother (Ma mère, Dieu et Sylvie Vartan)	Mme Vergepoche	Ken Scott	
TBA	Un ours dans le jura		Franck Dubosc	Filming

=== Television ===
Year	Title	Role	Director	Notes
1991	La mort d'Alexandre	Sylvie Merten	Jacques Audoir	TV movie
1995	Coeur de père	Annette	Agnès Delarive	TV movie
1997	Une femme en blanc	Sylvie	Aline Issermann	TV movie
1997	Navarro	Évelyne	Patrick Jamain	TV series (1 episode)
1998	Marceeel!!!		Agnès Delarive	TV movie
1998	De gré ou de force	Baby Sitter	Fabrice Cazeneuve	TV movie
1998–2005	Marc Eliot	Alice Tourneur	Josée Dayan, Édouard Niermans, ...	TV series (11 episodes)
1999	Les boeuf-carottes	The agency's director	Josée Dayan	TV series (1 episode)
1999–2002	Avocats & associés	Judge Bellac / Lacharrière	Alexandre Pidoux & Philippe Triboit	TV series (3 episodes)
2000	Sur quel pied danser ?	The judge	Jacques Fansten	TV movie
2000	P.J.	Suzanne Choiseul	Benoît d'Aubert	TV series (1 episode)
2000	Julie Lescaut	Madame Sauveur	Stéphane Kurc	TV series (1 episode)
2001	Un pique-nique chez Osiris	Rosalie	Nina Companeez	TV movie
2003	Ciel d'asile	Michèle	Philippe Bérenger	TV movie
2003	Le monde de Yoyo	Laurence Bellac	David Delrieux	TV movie
2003	Boulevard du Palais	Agnès Lubin	Benoît d'Aubert	TV series (1 episode)
2004	Clochemerle	Mademoiselle Putet	Daniel Losset	TV movie
2005	Prune Becker	Sophie	Alexandre Pidoux	TV series (1 episode)
2005	Sauveur Giordano	Myriam Fiorez	Pierre Joassin	TV series (1 episode)
2006	L'affaire Pierre Chanal	Madame Sergent	Patrick Poubel	TV movie
2006	Louis Page	Agathe Campello	Patrick Poubel	TV series (1 episode)
2006	Les tricheurs	Judge Florence Morillon	Benoît d'Aubert	TV series (1 episode)
2006	Madame le proviseur	Adeline Jaubert	Philippe Bérenger	TV series (2 episodes)
2008	Guy Môquet, un amour fusillé	Juliette Môquet	Philippe Bérenger	TV movie
2009	Enquêtes réservées	Régina Tréguet	Benoît d'Aubert	TV series (1 episode)
2013	Manipulations	Claire Archambault	Laurent Herbiet	TV movie
2017	The Frozen Dead	Catherine d'Humières	Laurent Herbiet	TV mini-series
2018	Ils ont échangé mon enfant	Maître Maurel	Agnès Obadia	TV movie
2021	Mixte	Hélène Giraud	Alexandre Castagnetti & Edouard Salier	TV mini-series
2021	Une Affaire Française	Madame Denise	Christophe Lamotte	TV mini-series
2023	Bardot	Olga Horstig	Danièle & Christopher Thompson	TV mini-series
2023	Polar Park	Anita Vita	Gérald Hustache-Mathieu	TV series (1 episode)

=== Screenwriter / Director ===
Year	Title	Role
2007	Those Who Remain	Director & writer
2008	Didine	Writer (with Vincent Dietschy)
2010	My Father's Guests	Director and writer
2012	Cornouaille	Director and writer
2014	Almost Friends	Director and writer
2015	Love at First Child	Write (with Anne Giafferi & Murielle Magellan)
2018	La monnaie de leur pièce	Director and writer
2022	Le torrent	Director and writer
TBA	Histoire d'un mariage	Director and writer

== Awards and nominations ==
Year	Award	Nominated work	Result
2008	César Award for Best First Feature Film	Those Who Remain	Nominated
2008	César Award for Best Original Screenplay	Those Who Remain	Nominated
2012	César Award for Best Supporting Actress	The Intouchables	Nominated
