= The Measure of a Man (2015 film) =

2015 film

- Film poster
- Directed by: Stéphane Brizé
- Written by: Stéphane Brizé; Olivier Gorce
- Produced by: Christophe Rossignon; Philip Boëffard
- Starring: Vincent Lindon
- Cinematography: Éric Dumont
- Edited by: Anne Klotz
- Production companies: Nord-Ouest Films; Arte France Cinéma
- Distributed by: Diaphana Distribution
- Release dates: 18 May 2015 (Cannes); 19 May 2015 (France)
- Running time: 93 minutes
- Country: France
- Language: French
- Box office: $6 million

The Measure of a Man (French: La Loi du marché) is a 2015 French drama film directed by Stéphane Brizé. It was selected to compete for the Palme d'Or at the 2015 Cannes Film Festival. At Cannes, Vincent Lindon won the award for Best Actor and the film won a commendation awarded by the Ecumenical Jury.

== Plot ==
Thierry has been unemployed for 18 months, having lost his job as a factory worker. At the age of 51, he lands a new job as a security guard in a supermarket. However, he must spy on his co-workers at the behest of his boss.

== Cast ==
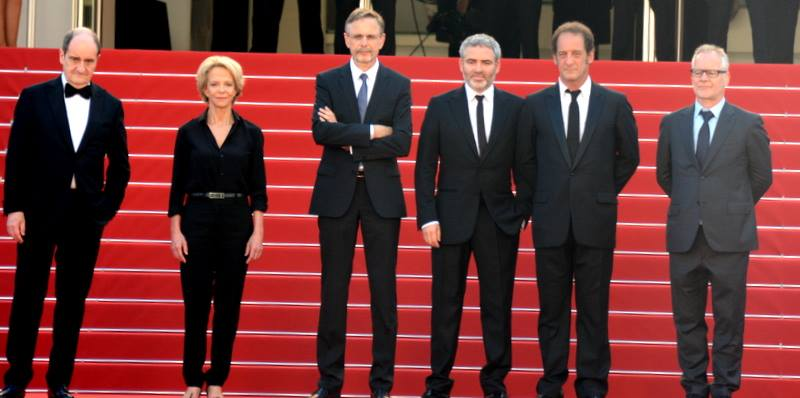
Cast and crew at the 2015 Cannes Film Festival.

- Vincent Lindon as Thierry Taugourdeau
- Yves Ory as Employment agency counsellor
- Karine De Mirbeck as Thierry's wife
- Matthieu Schaller as Thierry's son
- Xavier Mathieu as Union colleague
- Noël Mairot as Dance teacher
- Catherine Saint-Bonnet as banker

== Reception ==
=== Critical reception ===
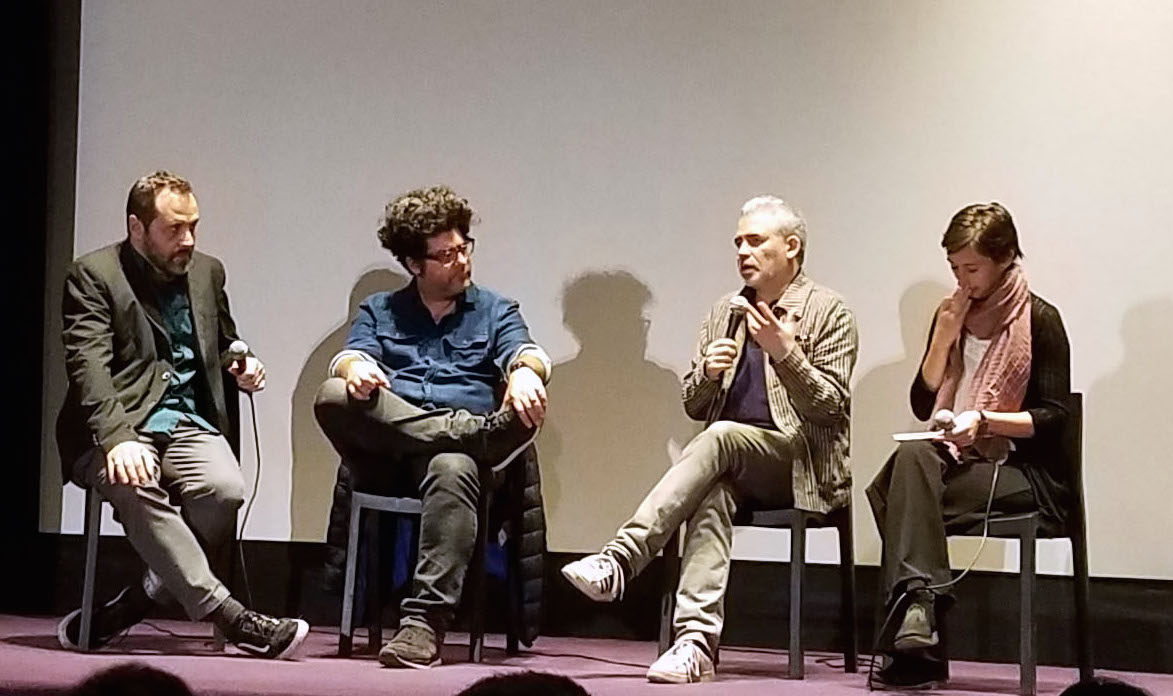
Stéphane Brizé (second from the right) in Buenos Aires in 2019, at a screening of 'The Measure of a Man'.

On review aggregator website Rotten Tomatoes, the film holds an approval rating of 92% based on 64 reviews, and an average rating of 7.2/10. The website's critical consensus reads, "With The Measure of a Man, director/co-writer Stéphane Brizé uses one man's heartrending story as a beautifully acted microcosm for life in the 21st-century global economy." On Metacritic, the film has a weighted average score of 74 out of 100, based on 19 critics.

=== Accolades ===
Award / Film Festival	Category	Recipients and nominees	Result
Brussels Film Festival	Audience Award		Won
Cannes Film Festival	Best Actor	Vincent Lindon	Won
Cannes Film Festival	Prize of the Ecumenical Jury - Special Mention		Won
Cannes Film Festival	Palme d'Or		Nominated
César Awards	Best Film		Nominated
César Awards	Best Director	Stéphane Brizé	Nominated
César Awards	Best Actor	Vincent Lindon	Won
Denver Film Festival	Special Ensemble Acting Jury Award	Cast of The Measure of a Man	Won
European Film Awards	European Actor	Vincent Lindon	Nominated
Louis Delluc Prize	Best Film		Nominated
Lumière Awards	Best Actor	Vincent Lindon	Won
Prix Jacques Prévert du Scénario	Best Original Screenplay	Stéphane Brizé and Olivier Gorce	Nominated
