= Stéphane Brizé =

French film director and screenwriter

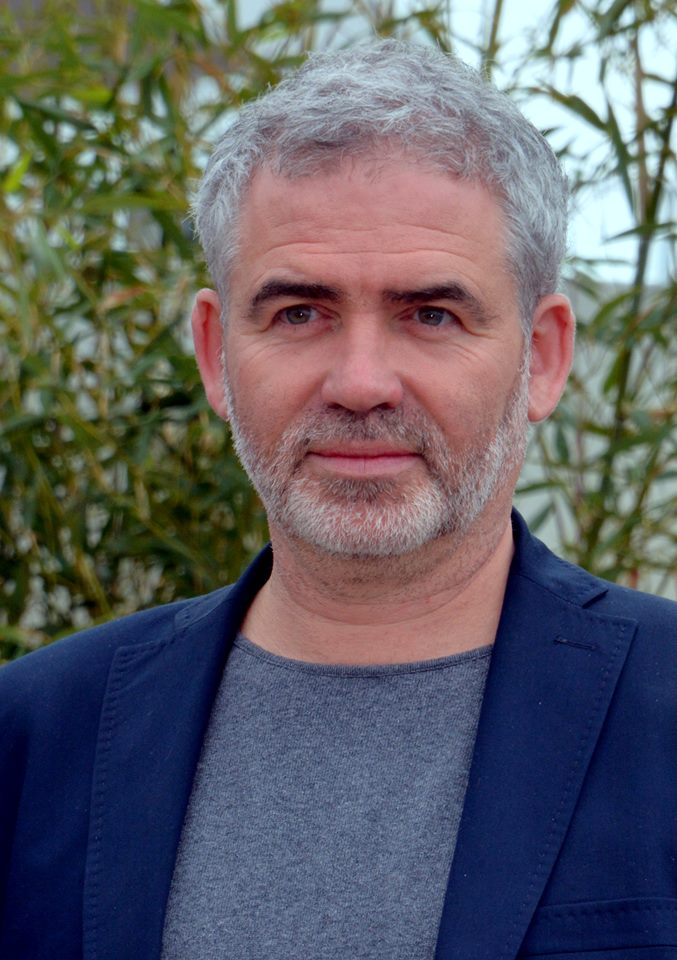
- Brizé in 2018
- Born: 18 October 1966 (age 60); Rennes, France
- Occupations: Film director, producer, screenwriter, actor
- Years active: 1993–present

Stéphane Brizé (born 18 October 1966) is a French filmmaker and actor. Most known for his social realist drama films, which usually follows 21st century French working class.

He regularly collaborates with Vincent Lindon, including in: Mademoiselle Chambon (2009), A Few Hours of Spring (2012), The Measure of a Man (2015), At War (2018), Another World (2021), and A Good Little Soldier (2026).

== Early life ==
Stéphane Brizé was born on 18 October 1966 in Rennes, France, from a mail carrier father and a stay-at-home mother.

After completing a university diploma in electronics at the University of Rennes, he undertook a final-year internship at France 3 Rennes that steered him toward the audiovisual sector. He became a television technician in Paris and took drama classes; he subsequently directed several plays.

== Career ==
In cinema, he directed his first short film in 1993, Bleu dommage, followed by a medium-length film in 1996, L'Œil qui traîne, before moving on to feature films in 1999 with Le Bleu des villes.

His sophomore feature film, Not Here to Be Loved (2005), starring Patrick Chesnais, received positive reviews, and solidified his career as an emerging filmmaker in the French industry.

Mademoiselle Chambon (2009), marked his first collaboration with the former couple Vincent Lindon and Sandrine Kiberlain. It follows a middle-aged man affair with his infant son teacher. At the 35th César Awards, it won the César Award for Best Adaptation.

His second collaboration with Lindon, A Few Hours of Spring (2012), premiered at the main competition of the 65th Locarno Film Festival, and follows an ex-convict return to his mother's home, during her final days of life due to a terminal cancer.

The Measure of a Man (2015) marked his first film selected to the main competition of the Cannes Film Festival at the 68th edition, where Vincent Lindon won the Best Actor prize. It follows an unemployed middle-aged man new position as security guard in a small supermarket. At the 41st César Awards, Brizé received his first Best Director nomination.

His drama film A Woman's Life (2016), premiered at the main competition of the 73rd Venice International Film Festival, where it won the FIPRESCI Prize. Starring Judith Chemla, it follows the decline of the French aristocracy during the 19th century, through the point of view of an innocent noblewoman. At War (2018), premiered at the main competition of the 71st Cannes Film Festival, where it competed for the Palme d'Or. It follows the leader of a strike who must protect his 1,100 colleague jobs.

His drama film Another World (2021), starring once again the former couple Vincent Lindon and Sandrine Kiberlain, follows the troubled separation of a middle-aged couple. It premiered at the main competition of the 78th Venice International Film Festival, where it competed for the Golden Lion.

Out of Season (2023), premiered at the main competition of the 80th Venice International Film Festival, where it competed for the Golden Lion. Starring Guillaume Canet and Alba Rohrwacher, it follows a former couple reconnecting their relationship after fifteen years. It received positive reviews.

His upcoming drama film Good Little Soldier (2026), will premiere at the main competition of the 83rd Venice International Film Festival, where it will compete for the Golden Lion. Marking his sixth collaboration with Vincent Lindon.

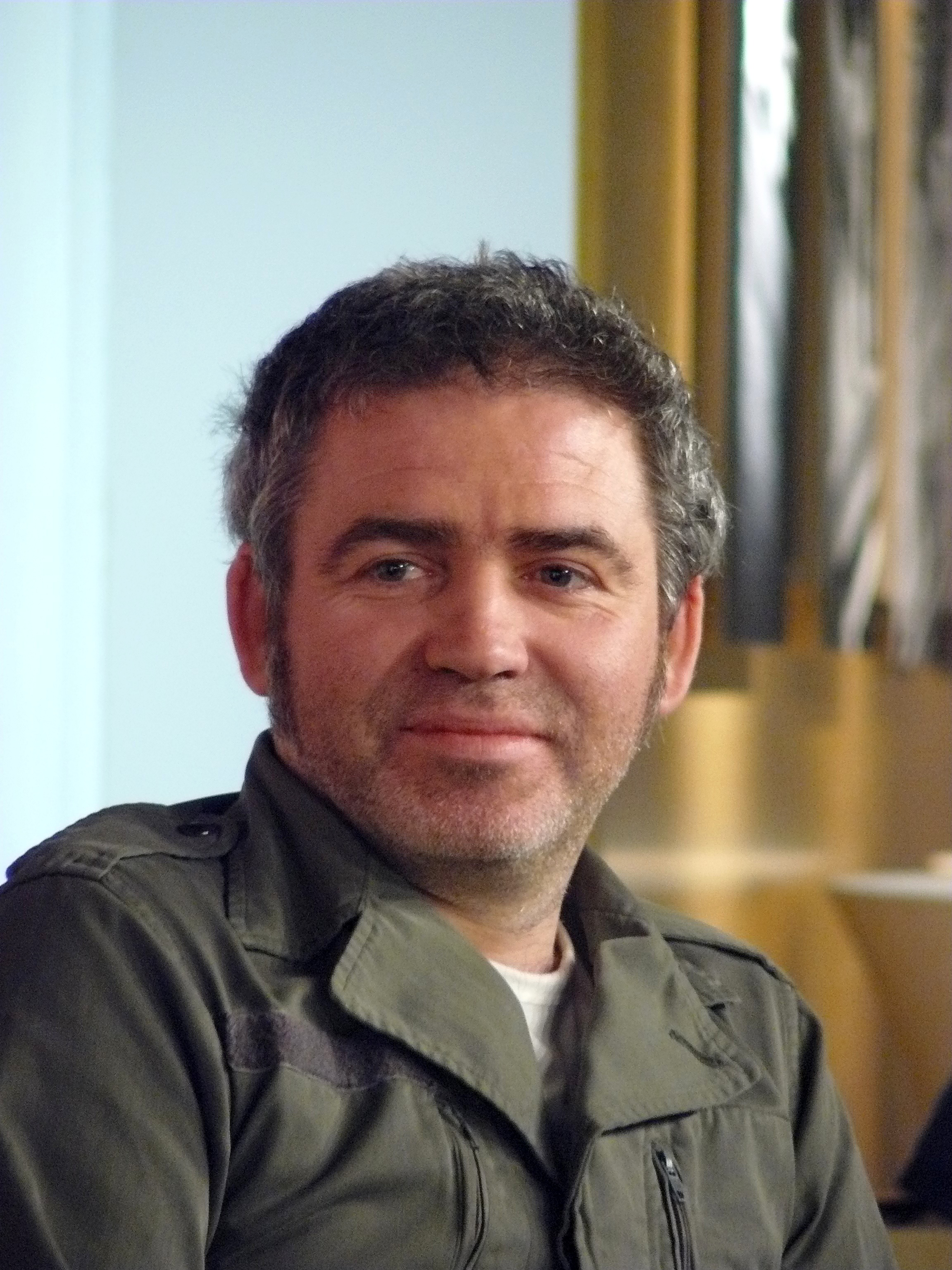
Brizé in 2010, during the DVD release of Mademoiselle Chambon

== Filmography ==
=== Feature films ===
Year	English title	Original title	Notes
1999	Hometown Blue	Le Bleu des villes	
2005	Not Here to Be Loved	Je ne suis pas là pour être aimé	Co-written with Juliette Sales
2006	Entre adultes		
2009	Mademoiselle Chambon		Co-written with Florence Vignon
2012	A Few Hours of Spring	Quelques heures de printemps	Co-written with Florence Vignon
2015	The Measure of a Man	La Loi du marché	Co-written with Olivier Gorce
2016	A Woman's Life	Une vie	Co-written with Florence Vignon
2018	At War	En Guerre	
2021	Another World	Un autre monde	Co-written with Olivier Gorce
2023	Out of Season	Hors-saison	Co-written with Marie Drucker
2026	A Good Little Soldier	Un bon petit soldat	Co-written with Coralie Amedeo and Olivier Gorce

=== Short films ===
Year	English title	Original title	Notes
1993	Bleu dommage		Also actor
1996	L'Œil qui traîne		

=== Other credits ===
Year	Title	Credited as			Notes
Year	Title	Director	Screenwriter	Actor	Notes
1995	Au petit Marguery			Yes	
1995	Ada sait pas dire non			Yes	Short film
1999	Our Happy Lives			Yes	
1999	Le Premier Pas		Yes		Short film
2008	The New Protocol			Yes	

== Awards ==
1999	Hometown Blue	Prix Michel d'Ornano (Deauville American Film Festival); Youth Jury Emile Cantillon Award - Honorable Mention (Festival International du Film Francophone de Namur)
2005	Not Here to Be Loved	CEC Award for Best Film (San Sebastián International Film Festival)
2009	Mademoiselle Chambon	César Award for Best Adaptation; FIPRESCI Prize (29th International Istanbul Film Festival); Nominated—Independent Spirit Award for Best Foreign Film
2012	A Few Hours of Spring	Nominated—César Award for Best Director; Nominated—César Award for Best Original Screenplay
2015	The Measure of a Man	Cannes Film Festival - Prize of the Ecumenical Jury (special mention); Nominated—Cannes Film Festival - Palme d'Or; Nominated—César Award for Best Film; Nominated—César Award for Best Director; Nominated—Prix Jacques Prévert du Scénario for Best Original Screenplay; Nominated—Louis Delluc Prize for Best Film
2016	A Woman's Life	Louis Delluc Prize for Best Film; Venice Film Festival - FIPRESCI Prize; Nominated—Lumière Award for Best Film; Nominated—Lumière Award for Best Director
2018	At War	Nominated—Cannes Film Festival - Palme d'Or
2021	Another World	Nominated—78th Venice International Film Festival - Golden Lion
2023	Out of Season	Nominated—80th Venice International Film Festival - Golden Lion
