= A Few Hours of Spring =

2012 film directed by Stéphane Brizé

- Film poster
- French: Quelques heures de printemps
- Directed by: Stéphane Brizé
- Written by: Florence Vignon; Stéphane Brizé
- Produced by: Miléna Poylo; Gilles Sacuto; Rémi Burah
- Starring: Vincent Lindon; Hélène Vincent; Emmanuelle Seigner
- Cinematography: Antoine Héberlé
- Edited by: Anne Klotz
- Music by: Nick Cave; Warren Ellis
- Production company: TS Productions
- Distributed by: Diaphana Films
- Release date: 19 September 2012
- Running time: 108 minutes
- Language: French
- Budget: $3.5 million
- Box office: $1.9 million

A Few Hours of Spring (French: Quelques heures de printemps) is a 2012 French drama film directed by Stéphane Brizé.

== Plot ==
After being released from prison, a man returns to his mother. Ill with terminal cancer, she decides to choose the time of her death.

== Cast ==
- Vincent Lindon as Alain Évrard
- Hélène Vincent as Yvette Évrard
- Emmanuelle Seigner as Clémence
- Olivier Perrier as Monsieur Lalouette
- Ludovic Berthillot as Bruno
- Silvia Kahn as Doctor Mathieu
- Véronique Montel as Madame Godard

== Production ==
Principal photography began in Seine-et-Marne. It was expected to last eight weeks and take place in the Île-de-France region and in Chalon-sur-Saône.

== Release ==
The film was presented at the Locarno International Film Festival, the Toronto International Film Festival, the Festival do Rio, the Reykjavík International Film Festival, the Stockholm International Film Festival, the Dubai International Film Festival, the Glasgow Film Festival, the City of Lights, City of Angels.
