= Sandrine Kiberlain =

French actress and singer

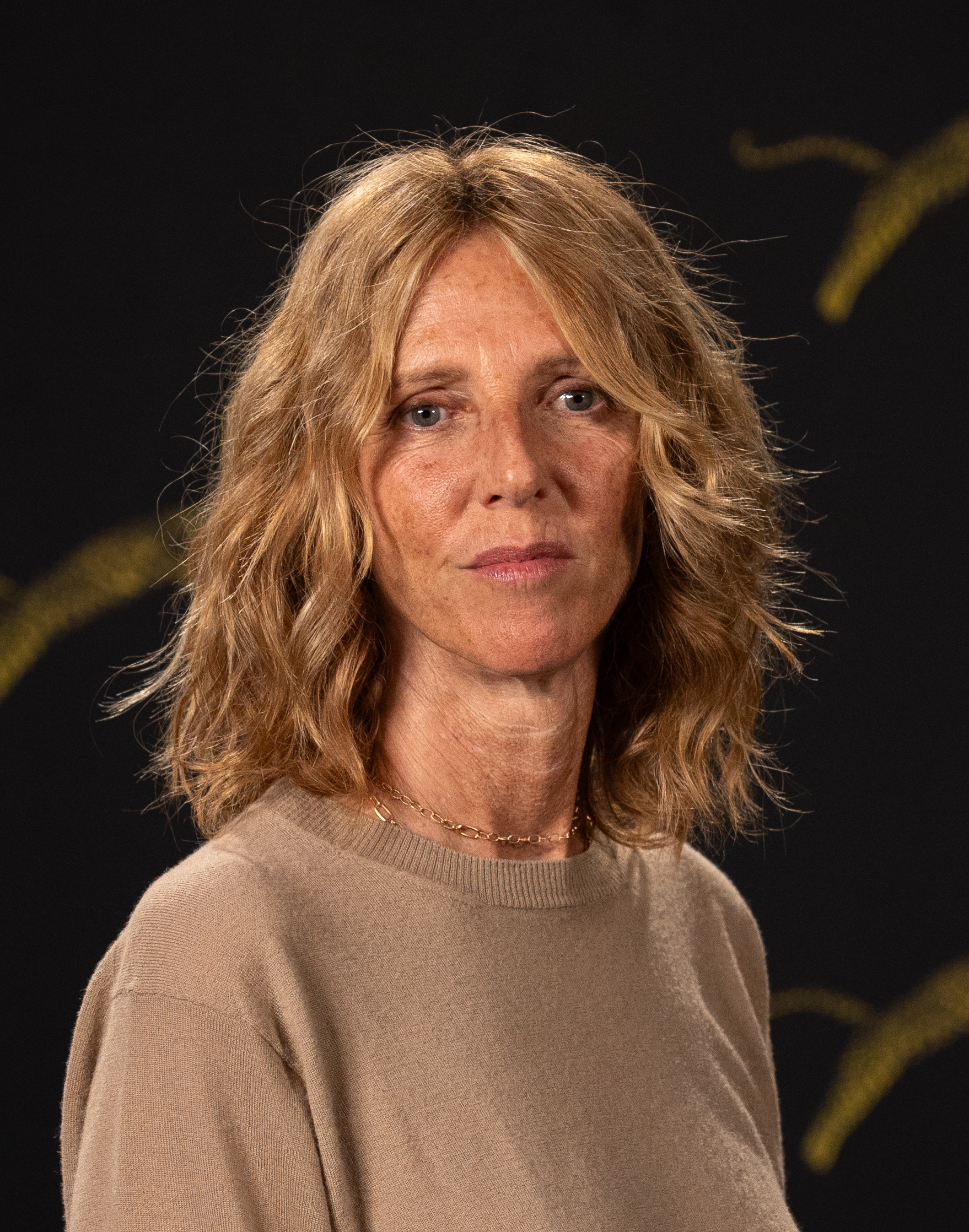
- Kiberlain in 2026
- Born: Sandrine Kiberlain; 25 February 1968 (age 58); Boulogne-Billancourt, France
- Education: Cours Florent & CNSAD
- Occupations: Actress & singer
- Years active: 1986–present
- Spouse: Vincent Lindon (m. 1998; div. 2008)
- Children: Suzanne Lindon

Sandrine Kiberlain (born Sandrine Kiberlajn; 25 February 1968) is a French actress and singer. Her most notable roles were in the films The Patriots (1994), A Self Made Hero (1996), For Sale (1998), Alias Betty (2001), Mademoiselle Chambon (2009), 9 Month Stretch (2013), and Number One Fan (2014). Kiberlain has appeared in over sixty films and won two César Awards from eight nominations.

In 2021, she made her directorial debut with the drama film A Radiant Girl.

== Career ==
Kiberlain attended Cours Florent 1987–1989 and French National Academy of Dramatic Arts 1989–1992.

Kiberlain received the Prix Romy Schneider in 1995. In addition to her acting career, she also has recorded an album (Manquait plus qu'ça, released in 2005), which was well received in France. Her second album, Coupés bien net et bien carré, was released in October 2007.

She is president of the jury of the 2018 Deauville American Film Festival.

In February 2020, she presided over the 45th César Awards ceremony.

== Personal life ==
Her four grandparents are Polish Jews. Her paternal grandfather came to France in 1933.. Her parents met in Cours Florent.

Kiberlain married actor Vincent Lindon in 1998, with whom she has a daughter, Suzanne, born in 2000. The couple met in 1993 on the set of the film L'Irrésolu (1994). They separated in 2003.

On March 5, 2015, Kiberlain appeared on the cover of Paris Match, with Édouard Baer.

== Philanthropy ==
Kiberlain has been a member of the Les Enfoirés charity ensemble since 1997.

== Filmography ==
Year	Title	Role	Director	Notes
1986	Cours privé	Uncredited	Pierre Granier-Deferre	
1986	On a volé Charlie Spencer	A Bank Worker	Francis Huster	
1989	Les jupons de la révolution	Alexandrine d'Oppède	Maroun Bagdadi	TV series (1 Episode)
1989	Les compagnons de l'aventure	A pharmacist	Christophe Andrei	TV series (1 Episode : "Philoxamil 50")
1990	Cyrano de Bergerac	Sister Colette	Jean-Paul Rappeneau	
1991	Milena	Uncredited	Vera Belmont	
1991	Des filles et des chiens		Sophie Fillières	Short
1992	Stranger in the House	Marie Maitray	Georges Lautner	
1992	Sexes faibles !	The waitress	Serge Meynard	
1993	L'Instinct de l'ange	Pauline	Richard Dembo	
1993	Les gens normaux n'ont rien d'exceptionnel	Florence	Laurence Ferreira Barbosa	
1993	Comment font les gens	Irène	Pascale Bailly	Short
1993	Méprises multiples	Kim	Christian Charmetant	Short
1993	Cuentos de Borges	Elsa	Benoît Jacquot	TV series (1 Episode)
1994	The Patriots	Marie-Claude	Éric Rochant	Nominated - César Award for Most Promising Actress
1994	L'irrésolu	Gaelle	Jean-Pierre Ronssin	
1995	To Have (or Not)	Alice	Laetitia Masson	César Award for Most Promising Actress; Brussels Film Festival - Crystal Star - Best Actress
1995	Tom est tout seul	Laurette	Fabien Onteniente	
1995	Les tous petits détails	The Woman	Valérie Liligion	Short
1996	A Self Made Hero	Yvette	Jacques Audiard	Nominated - César Award for Best Supporting Actress
1996	Beaumarchais	Marie-Thérèse Willermaulaz	Edouard Molinaro	
1996	The Apartment	Muriel	Gilles Mimouni	
1996	Je suis venue te dire	The Woman	Laetitia Masson (2)	Short
1997	Seventh Heaven	Mathilde	Benoît Jacquot (2)	Nominated - César Award for Best Actress
1997	Quadrille	Claudine André	Valérie Lemercier	
1998	For Sale	France Robert	Laetitia Masson (3)	Étoiles d'Or - Best Actress; Nominated - César Award for Best Actress
1999	Rien sur Robert	Juliette Sauvage	Pascal Bonitzer	
2000	False Servant	The Knight	Benoît Jacquot (3)	
2000	Tout va bien, on s'en va	Béatrice	Claude Mouriéras	Étoiles d'Or - Best Actress
2000	Love me	Gabrielle Rose	Laetitia Masson (4)	
2001	Alias Betty	Betty Fisher	Claude Miller	Silver Hugo Award for Best Actress; Montreal World Film Festival - Best Actress
2001	Émilie est partie	Léa	Thierry Klifa	Short
2002	Special Delivery	Catherine	Jeanne Labrune	
2003	Sole Sisters	Carole	Pierre Jolivet	
2003	After You...	Blanche Grimaldi	Pierre Salvadori	
2004	Un petit jeu sans conséquence	Claire	Bernard Rapp	
2007	La Vie d'artiste	Alice	Marc Fitoussi	
2007	Très bien, merci	Béatrice	Emmanuelle Cuau	
2009	Mademoiselle Chambon	Véronique Chambon	Stéphane Brizé	International Istanbul Film Festival - Special Prize of the Jury; Nominated - César Award for Best Actress
2009	Little Nicholas	The teacher	Laurent Tirard	
2009	Romaine par moins 30	Romaine Blot	Agnès Obadia	
2010	The Women on the 6th Floor	Suzanne Joubert	Philippe Le Guay	
2010	A View of Love	Clotilde Palestro	Nicole Garcia	
2011	Polisse	Madame de la Faublaise	Maïwenn	
2011	Beur sur la ville	Diane	Djamel Bensalah	
2011	The Bird	Anne	Yves Caumon	
2012	The Players	Marie-Christine	Alexandre Courtès	
2012	Pauline détective	Pauline	Marc Fitoussi (2)	
2012	Rue Mandar	Emma	Idit Cebula	
2013	9 Month Stretch	Ariane Felder	Albert Dupontel	César Award for Best Actress; Nominated - Globes de Cristal Award for Best Actress; Nominated - Lumière Award for Best Actress
2013	Violette	Simone de Beauvoir	Martin Provost	
2013	Tip Top	Sally Marinelli	Serge Bozon	
2013	Les gamins	Suzanne	Anthony Marciano	
2014	Number One Fan	Muriel Bayen	Jeanne Herry	Nominated - César Award for Best Actress; Nominated - Globes de Cristal Award for Best Actress; Nominated - Lumière Award for Best Actress
2014	Life of Riley	Monica	Alain Resnais	
2015	The Sweet Escape	Rachelle	Bruno Podalydès	
2015	Floride	Carole Lherminier	Philippe Le Guay (2)	
2016	Being 17	Marianne	André Téchiné	
2016	Encore heureux	Marie Ogiel	Benoît Graffin	Nominated - Globes de Cristal Award for Best Actress
2018	La belle et la belle	Margaux	Sophie Fillières	
2018	Black Tide	Solange Arnault	Erick Zonca	
2018	Amoureux de ma femme	Isabelle	Daniel Auteuil	
2018	In Safe Hands	Karine	Jeanne Herry	Nominated - César Award for Best Actress
2019	Sweetheart		Lisa Azuelos	
2021	A Radiant Girl	—N/a	Sandrine Kiberlain	Directorial debut
2021	Hear Me Out	Claire	Pascal Elbé	
2021	Another World	Anne Lemesle	Stéphane Brizé	
2022	Diary of a Fleeting Affair	Charlotte	Emmanuel Mouret	
2022	November	Héloïse	Cédric Jimenez	
2022	The Green Perfume	Claire Mayer	Nicolas Pariser	
2024	Meet the Barbarians	Anne Poudoulec	Julie Delpy	
2024	Sarah Bernhardt, la Divine	Sarah Bernhardt	Guillaume Nicloux	
2025	The Piano Accident	Simone Herzog	Quentin Dupieux	
2026	Ceux qui comptent	Rose Balestri	Jean-Baptiste Léonetti	
2026	All About Corinne (Ni vue, ni connue)	Herself	Marc Fitoussi	

== Discography ==
=== Albums ===
- Manquait plus qu'ça (2005)
- Coupés bien net et bien carré (2007)

=== Singles ===
==== As main artist ====
- La Chanteuse (2007)

==== As featured artist ====
- Vole (2016) (charity single with Carla Bruni, Nolwenn Leroy, Laurent Voulzy...)
