= Those Who Remain =

- Theatrical release poster
- French: Ceux qui restent
- Directed by: Anne Le Ny
- Written by: Anne Le Ny
- Produced by: Jean-Philippe Andraca; Christian Bérard
- Starring: Emmanuelle Devos; Vincent Lindon
- Cinematography: Patrick Blossier
- Edited by: Idit Bloch
- Music by: Béatrice Thiriet
- Production companies: Les Films A4; StudioCanal; France 2 Cinéma; Rectangle Productions
- Distributed by: StudioCanal
- Release date: 29 August 2007
- Running time: 94 minutes
- Country: France
- Language: French
- Budget: $3.8 million
- Box office: $3 million

Those Who Remain (French: Ceux qui restent) is a 2007 French drama film written and directed by Anne Le Ny, starring Vincent Lindon and Emmanuelle Devos.

== Cast ==
- Vincent Lindon as Bertrand Liévain
- Emmanuelle Devos as Lorraine Grégeois
- Yeelem Jappain as Valentine
- Anne Le Ny as Nathalie
- Grégoire Oestermann as Jean-Paul
- Christine Murillo as Suzy
- Ophélia Kolb as Jennifer
- Apolline Bouissières as Myriam
- Agathe Bouissières as Bénédicte
- Théo Frilet as Romain
- Pierre Gérard as Thierry

== Reception ==
Le Parisien gave the film four out of five stars and described it as sensitive and powerful.

== Accolades ==
| Award / Film Festival | Category | Recipients | Result |
|---|---|---|---|
| César Award | Best First Feature Film | Anne Le Ny | Nominated |
| César Award | Best Actor | Vincent Lindon | Nominated |
| César Award | Best Original Screenplay | Anne Le Ny | Nominated |
| Globes de Cristal Award | Best Actor | Vincent Lindon | Nominated |
