= List of French films of 2015 =

A list of French-produced films scheduled for release in 2015.

== 2015 ==
Title	Director	Cast	Genre	Notes	Release date
108 Demon Kings	Pascal Morelli	Sylvain Mounier, Melissa Cornu, Hugues Hausma	Family adventure	Computer-animated	21 January
All About Them	Jérôme Bonnell	Anaïs Demoustier, Félix Moati and Sophie Verbeeck	Romantic dramedy		25 March
Amnesia	Barbet Schroeder	Marthe Keller, Max Riemelt	Drama		19 August
April and the Twisted World	Christian Desmares and Franck Ekinci	Marion Cotillard, Yolande Moreau, Jean Rochefort, Olivier Gourmet, Bouli Lanners	Animation		11 November
A Perfect Man	Yann Gozlan	Pierre Niney and Ana Girardot	Thriller		18 March
Bis	Dominique Farrugia	Kad Merad and Franck Dubosc	Comedy		18 February
Bizarre	Étienne Faure	Pierre Prieur, Adrian James	Drama	Premiered at the 65th Berlin International Film Festival	
Blood Father	Jean-François Richet	Mel Gibson, Erin Moriarty, William H. Macy	Action thriller	Based on the novel Blood Father by Peter Craig	
Caprice	Emmanuel Mouret	Emmanuel Mouret, Virginie Efira, Anaïs Demoustier and Laurent Stocker	Romantic comedy		22 April
Chic!	Jérôme Cornuau	Fanny Ardant, Marina Hands, Éric Elmosnino, Laurent Stocker	Romantic comedy		7 January
Courted	Christian Vincent	Fabrice Luchini, Sidse Babett Knudsen	Drama		
Daddy or Mommy	Martin Bourboulon	Marina Foïs, Laurent Lafitte	Comedy		4 February
Dheepan	Jacques Audiard	Antonythasan Jesuthasan	Drama	Palme d'Or winner - 2015 Cannes Film Festival	26 August
Diary of a Chambermaid	Benoît Jacquot	Léa Seydoux, Vincent Lindon	Drama	Based on the novel The Diary of a Chambermaid by Octave Mirbeau; Premiered at the 65th Berlin International Film Festival	1 April
Disorder	Alice Winocour	Matthias Schoenaerts, Diane Kruger	Thriller drama		30 September
Don't Tell Me the Boy Was Mad	Robert Guédiguian	Syrus Shahidi, Ariane Ascaride, Grégoire Leprince-Ringuet	Drama		11 November
Entre amis	Olivier Baroux	Daniel Auteuil, Gérard Jugnot, François Berléand, Zabou Breitman, Mélanie Doutey and Isabelle Gélinas	Comedy		22 April
Eva & Leon	Émilie Cherpitel	Clotilde Hesme, Florian Lemaire	Drama		17 June
Fatima	Phillipe Faucon	Zita Hanrot	Drama		7 October
I Am a Soldier	Laurent Larivière	Louise Bourgoin, Jean-Hugues Anglade	Drama		18 November
In the Shadow of Women	Philippe Garrel	Clotilde Courau, Stanislas Merhar, Lena Paugam	Drama		27 May
Ice and the Sky	Luc Jacquet	Claude Lorius	Documentary		21 October
I Kissed a Girl	Noémie Saglio and Maxime Govare	Pio Marmaï	Comedy		28 January
La Belle saison	Catherine Corsini	Cécile de France, Izïa Higelin	Drama		19 August
Learn by Heart	Mathieu Vadepied	Alamine Touré, Ali Bidanessy	Comedy-drama		
Les Bêtises	Rose Philippon and Alice Philippon	Jérémie Elkaïm, Sara Giraudeau	Comedy		22 July
Louder Than Bombs	Joachim Trier	Jesse Eisenberg, Gabriel Byrne, Isabelle Huppert	Drama		
Marguerite & Julien	Valérie Donzelli	Anaïs Demoustier, Jérémie Elkaïm	Drama		2 December
Macadam Stories	Samuel Benchetrit	Michael Pitt, Isabelle Huppert, Valeria Bruni Tedeschi, Gustave Kervern	Comedy-drama		7 October
Microbe & Gasoline	Michel Gondry	Théophile Baquet, Ange Dargent, Audrey Tautou	Comedy		8 July
Mon roi	Maïwenn	Vincent Cassel, Emmanuelle Bercot, Louis Garrel, Isild Le Besco	Drama	Best Actress Award - 2015 Cannes Film Festival	21 October
Mountains May Depart	Jia Zhangke	Zhao Tao	Drama		9 December
Much Loved	Nabil Ayouch	Loubna Abidar	Drama		16 September
My Golden Years	Arnaud Desplechin	Quentin Dolmaire, Lou Roy-Lecollinet, Mathieu Amalric, Françoise Lebrun	Drama		20 May
Shaun the Sheep	Richard Starzak and Mark Burton	Justin Fletcher, John Sparkes	Animation	Based on the television series Shaun the Sheep; Premiered at the 2015 Sundance Film Festival	1 April
Taken 3	Olivier Megaton	Liam Neeson, Forest Whitaker, Famke Janssen, Maggie Grace, Dougray Scott, Sam Spruell, Leland Orser	Action thriller	Sequel to Taken 2 (2012)	21 January
Tale of Tales	Matteo Garrone	Salma Hayek, Vincent Cassel, Toby Jones, John C. Reilly	Fantasy horror		1 July
The Anarchists	Elie Wajeman	Tahar Rahim, Adèle Exarchopoulos	Drama		11 November
The Brand New Testament	Jaco Van Dormael	Benoît Poelvoorde, Yolande Moreau, Catherine Deneuve, François Damiens	Comedy		2 September
The Cowboys	Thomas Bidegain	John C. Reilly	Drama		25 November
The Art Dealer	François Margolin	Anna Sigalevitch, François Berléand, Michel Bouquet, Robert Hirsch, Louis-Do de Lencquesaing	Thriller drama		18 March
The Gunman	Pierre Morel	Sean Penn, Javier Bardem, Ray Winstone, Idris Elba, Mark Rylance, Jasmine Trinca	Action thriller	Based on the novel The Prone Gunman by Jean-Patrick Manchette	24 June
The Little Prince	Mark Osborne	Riley Osborne, Marion Cotillard, Rachel McAdams, James Franco, Jeff Bridges	Animation	Based on the novel The Little Prince by Antoine de Saint-Exupéry	29 July
The Lobster	Yorgos Lanthimos	Colin Farrell, Rachel Weisz, Ben Whishaw, Léa Seydoux, John C. Reilly, Olivia Colman	Science fiction	Jury Prize - 2015 Cannes Film Festival	28 October
The Measure of a Man	Stéphane Brizé	Vincent Lindon	Drama	Best Actor Award - 2015 Cannes Film Festival	19 May
The Night Watchman	Pierre Jolivet	Olivier Gourmet, Valérie Bonneton, Marc Zinga	Thriller		8 April
The Sweet Escape	Bruno Podalydès	Bruno Podalydès, Sandrine Kiberlain, Agnès Jaoui, Vimala Pons	Comedy		10 June
The Transporter Refueled	Camille Delamarre	Ed Skrein	Action thriller	Fourth film in the Transporter franchise	9 September
The Wakhan Front	Clément Cogitore	Jérémie Renier	Drama		30 September
Two Friends	Louis Garrel	Golshifteh Farahani, Vincent Macaigne, Louis Garrel	Romantic dramedy		23 September
Une Enfance	Philippe Claudel	Pierre Deladonchamps	Drama		14 October
Valley of Love	Guillaume Nicloux	Gérard Depardieu, Isabelle Huppert	Drama		17 June
Vanity (La Vanité)	Lionel Baier	Patrick Lapp, Carmen Maura, Ivan Georgiev	Drama		
Wolf Totem	Jean-Jacques Annaud	Feng Shaofeng, Shawn Dou, Ankhnyam Ragchaa, Basen Zhabu	Drama		25 February
