= 21st Lumière Awards =

2016 French film awards ceremony

- Official poster
- Date: 8 February 2016
- Site: Espace Pierre Cardin, Paris, France
- Hosted by: Aïda Touihri and Patrick Fabre

Highlights
- Best Film: Mustang
- Best Director: Arnaud Desplechin
- Best Actor: Vincent Lindon
- Best Actress: Catherine Frot
- Most awards: Mustang (4)
- Most nominations: My Golden Days (7)

Television coverage
- Network: Ciné+ TV5Monde

The 21st Lumière Awards ceremony, presented by the Académie des Lumières, was held on 8 February 2016, at the Espace Pierre Cardin in Paris to honour the best in French films of 2015. Nominees were announced on 4 January 2016. My Golden Days garnered the most nominations, with a total of seven.

Mustang won four awards, out of its six nominations, including Best Film and Best First Film.

== Winners and nominees ==
| Best Film Mustang: Summertime; Dheepan; Courted; Marguerite; My Golden Days | Best Director Arnaud Desplechin — My Golden Days: Jacques Audiard — Dheepan; Catherine Corsini — Summertime; Philippe Garrel — In the Shadow of Women; Xavier Giannoli — Marguerite; Maïwenn — Mon roi |
| Best Actor Vincent Lindon — The Measure of a Man & Diary of a Chambermaid: Gérard Depardieu — Valley of Love; André Dussollier — 21 Nights with Pattie; Fabrice Luchini — Courted; Vincent Macaigne — Two Friends; Jérémie Renier — The Wakhan Front | Best Actress Catherine Frot — Marguerite: Emmanuelle Bercot — Mon roi; Clotilde Courau — In the Shadow of Women; Izïa Higelin — Summertime; Isabelle Huppert — Valley of Love; Elsa Zylberstein — Un plus une |
| Best Male Revelation Rod Paradot — Standing Tall: Stany Coppet — La Vie pure; Quentin Dolmaire — My Golden Days; Alban Lenoir — French Blood; Félix Moati — All About Them; Harmandeep Palminder — Young Tiger | Best Female Revelation Güneş Nezihe Şensoy, Doğa Zeynep Doğuşlu, Elit Işcan, Tuğba Sunguroğlu & Ilayda Akdoğan — Mustang: Golshifteh Farahani — Two Friends; Sara Giraudeau — Les Bêtises; Baya Medhaffar — As I Open My Eyes; Lou Roy-Lecollinet — My Golden Days; Sophie Verbeeck — All About Them |
| Best First Film Mustang: Young Tiger; Two Friends; The Wakhan Front; La Vie pure; Vincent | Best Screenplay Fatima — Philippe Faucon: Summertime — Catherine Corsini and Laurette Polmanss; My Golden Days — Arnaud Desplechin and Julie Peyr; Mustang — Deniz Gamze Ergüven and Alice Winocour; Marguerite — Xavier Giannoli; 21 Nights with Pattie — Arnaud and Jean-Marie Larrieu |
| Best Cinematography David Chizallet — Mustang, The Anarchists & I Am a Soldier: Matias Boucard — L'Affaire SK1; Irina Lubtchansky — My Golden Days; Claire Mathon — The Last Hammer Blow, Mon roi & Two Friends; Arnaud Potier — Cowboys; Sylvain Verdet — The Wakhan Front | Best Music Grégoire Hetzel — Summertime & My Golden Days: Bruno Coulais — Diary of a Chambermaid; Warren Ellis — Mustang; Gesaffelstein — Disorder; Béatrice Thiriet — L'Astragale; Jean-Claude Vannier — Microbe & Gasoline |
| Best Documentary (Tie) The Pearl Button & The Missing Picture: Human; South to North; Tomorrow; We Come as Friends | Best French-Language Film Much Loved: As I Open My Eyes; Next Year; The Rooftops; The Brand New Testament; La Vanité |
Honorary Lumières Isabelle Huppert

== Films with multiple nominations and awards ==
The following films received multiple nominations:

| Nominations | Film |
|---|---|
| 7 | My Golden Days |
| 6 | Mustang |
| 5 | Summertime |
| 4 | Marguerite |
| 4 | Two Friends |
| 3 | Mon roi |
| 3 | The Wakhan Front |
2
| 2 | Dheepan |
| 2 | Courted |
| 2 | In the Shadow of Women |
| 2 | 21 Nights with Pattie |
| 2 | Valley of Love |
| 2 | Diary of a Chambermaid |
| 2 | La Vie pure |
| 2 | As I Open My Eyes |
| 2 | All About Them |
| 2 | Young Tiger |

The following films received multiple awards:

| Awards | Film |
|---|---|
| 4 | Mustang |
| 2 | My Golden Days |

== See also ==
- 41st César Awards
- 6th Magritte Awards
