= 41st César Awards =

2016 French film awards ceremony

- Official poster featuring a photo of Juliette Binoche during the shooting of the 1996 film The English Patient
- Date: 26 February 2016
- Site: Théâtre du Châtelet, Paris, France
- Hosted by: Florence Foresti

Highlights
- Best Film: Fatima
- Best Actor: Vincent Lindon; The Measure of a Man
- Best Actress: Catherine Frot; Marguerite
- Most awards: Mustang and Marguerite (4)
- Most nominations: Marguerite and My Golden Days (11)

Television coverage
- Network: Canal+

The 41st César Awards ceremony, presented by the Académie des Arts et Techniques du Cinéma, was held on 26 February 2016, at the Théâtre du Châtelet in Paris to honour the best French films of 2015. The ceremony was presided by Claude Lelouch, with Florence Foresti hosting the ceremony for the first time.

The nominations were announced on 27 January 2016 by Academy president Alain Terzian and awards ceremony host Florence Foresti. Marguerite and My Golden Days tied for the most nominations with eleven each.

In related events, the César & Techniques 2016 ceremony was held on 4 January 2016. On 22 February 2016, in a ceremony at the Hôtel George-V, the Prix Daniel Toscan du Plantier for producers of the year went to Pascal Caucheteux and Grégoire Sorlat of Why Not Productions (My Golden Days, Dheepan, The Sweet Escape and The Price of Fame).

Mustang and Marguerite won four awards each. Other films with multiple awards include Fatima with three, and Standing Tall with two, with the former film winning the Best Film honour.

== Winners and nominees ==
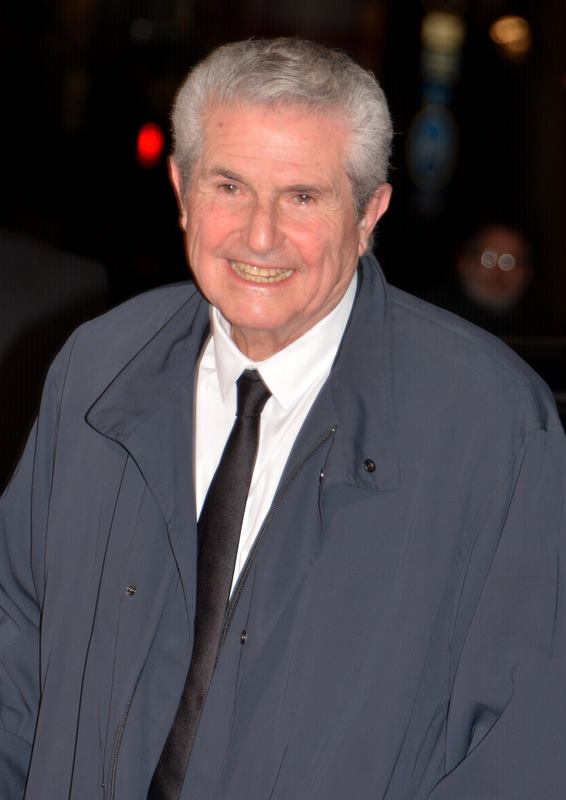
Claude Lelouch, President of the ceremony.

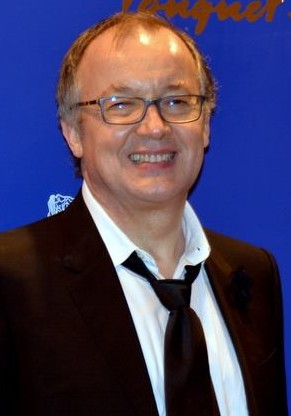
Philippe Faucon, director and writer of Fatima, won the César Awards for Best Film and Best Adaptation.

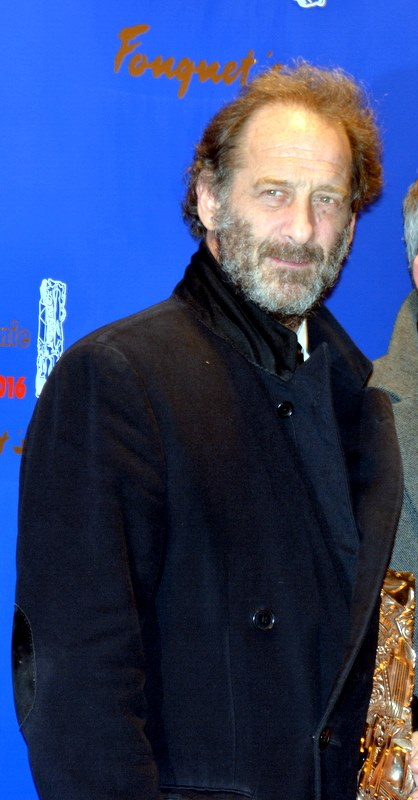
Vincent Lindon, Best Actor winner.

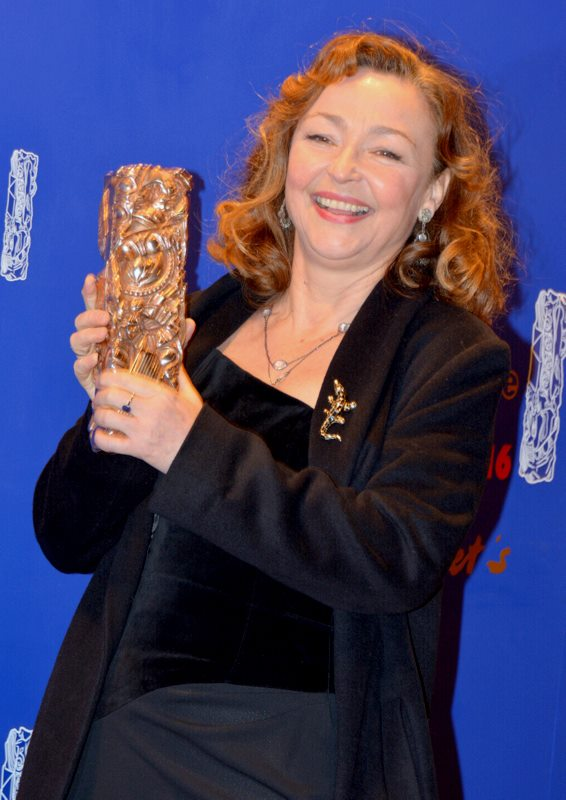
Catherine Frot, Best Actress winner.

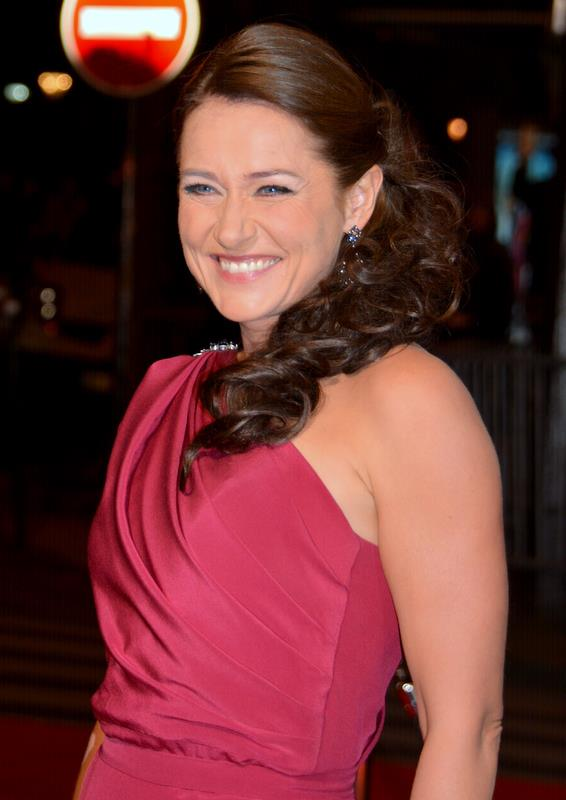
Sidse Babett Knudsen, Best Supporting Actress winner.

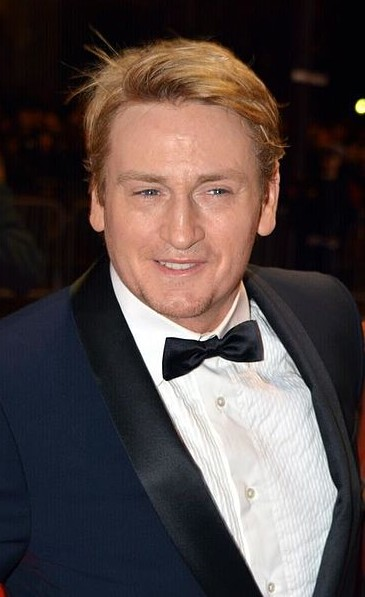
Benoît Magimel, Best Supporting Actor winner.

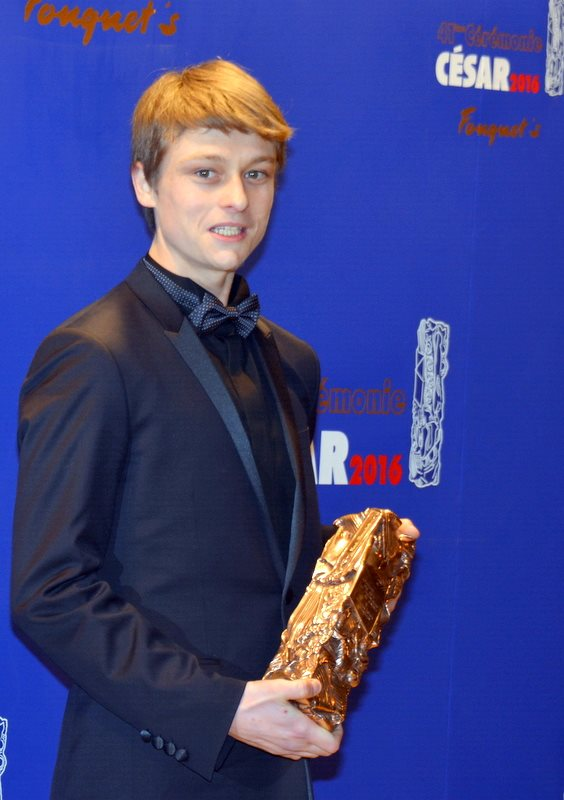
Rod Paradot, Most Promising Actor winner.

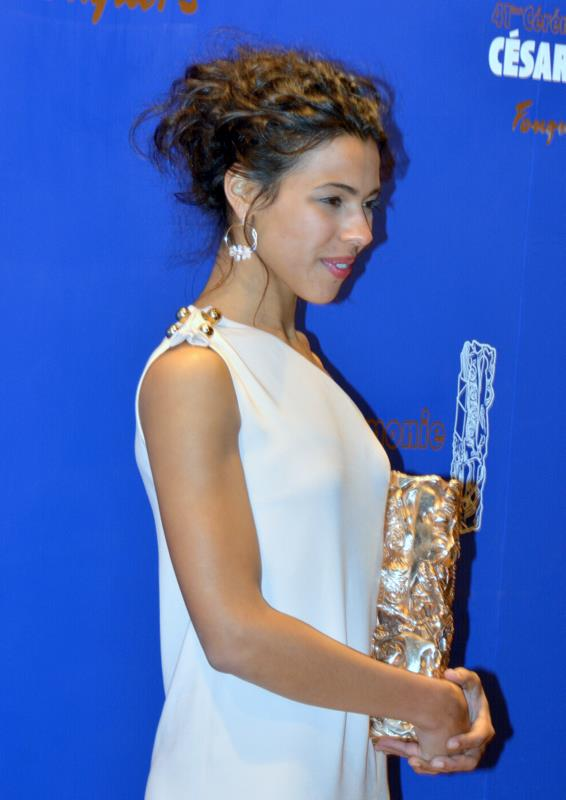
Zita Hanrot, Most Promising Actress winner.

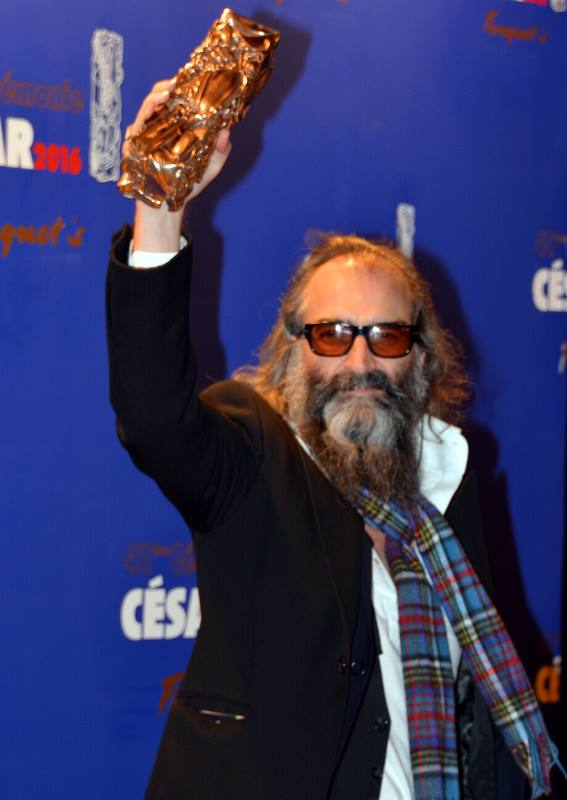
Warren Ellis, Best Original Music winner.

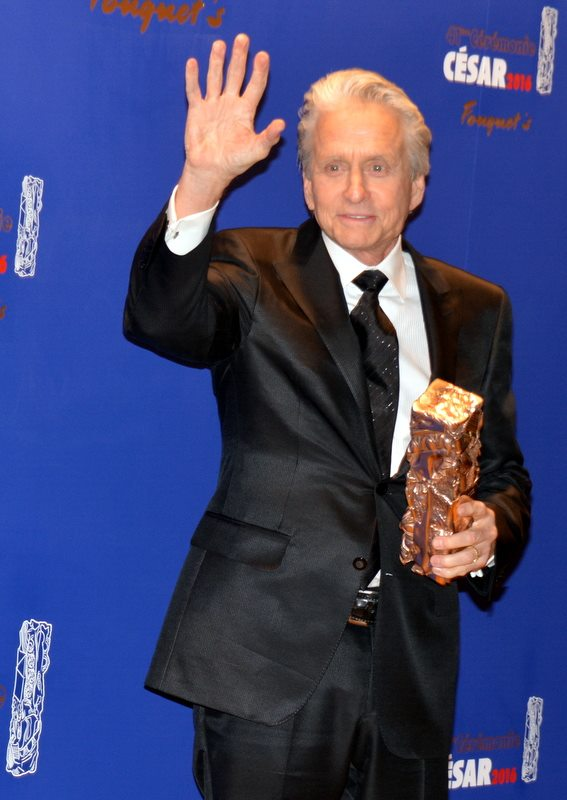
Michael Douglas, Honorary César recipient.

Best Film (presented by Juliette Binoche) Fatima: Dheepan; The Measure of a Man; Marguerite; Mon roi; Mustang; Standing Tall; My Golden Days	Best Director (presented by Gilles Lellouche) Arnaud Desplechin – My Golden Days: Jacques Audiard – Dheepan; Stéphane Brizé – The Measure of a Man; Xavier Giannoli – Marguerite; Maïwenn – Mon roi; Deniz Gamze Ergüven – Mustang; Emmanuelle Bercot – Standing Tall
Best Actor (presented by Emmanuelle Béart) Vincent Lindon – The Measure of a Man: Jean-Pierre Bacri – The Very Private Life of Mister Sim; Vincent Cassel – Mon roi; François Damiens – Cowboys; Gérard Depardieu – Valley of Love; Antonythasan Jesuthasan – Dheepan; Fabrice Luchini – Courted	Best Actress (presented by Matthias Schoenaerts) Catherine Frot – Marguerite: Loubna Abidar – Much Loved; Emmanuelle Bercot – Mon roi; Cécile de France – Summertime; Catherine Deneuve – Standing Tall; Isabelle Huppert – Valley of Love; Soria Zeroual – Fatima
Best Supporting Actor (presented by Elsa Zylberstein) Benoît Magimel – Standing Tall: Michel Fau – Marguerite; Louis Garrel – Mon roi; André Marcon – Marguerite; Vincent Rottiers – Dheepan	Best Supporting Actress (presented by Marie Gillain and Raphaël Personnaz) Sidse Babett Knudsen – Courted: Sara Forestier – Standing Tall; Agnès Jaoui – The Sweet Escape; Noémie Lvovsky – Summertime; Karin Viard – 21 Nights with Pattie
Most Promising Actor (presented by Louane Emera) Rod Paradot – Standing Tall: Swann Arlaud – Les Anarchistes; Quentin Dolmaire – My Golden Days; Félix Moati – All About Them; Finnegan Oldfield – Cowboys	Most Promising Actress (presented by Carole Bouquet) Zita Hanrot – Fatima: Lou Roy-Lecollinet – My Golden Days; Diane Rouxel – Standing Tall; Sara Giraudeau – Les Bêtises; Camille Cottin – Connasse, Princesse des cœurs
Best Original Screenplay (presented by Patrick Bruel) Mustang – Deniz Gamze Ergüven and Alice Winocour: Dheepan – Jacques Audiard, Thomas Bidegain and Noé Debré; Marguerite – Xavier Giannoli; Standing Tall – Emmanuelle Bercot and Marcia Romano; My Golden Days – Arnaud Desplechin and Julie Peyr	Best Adaptation (presented by Zabou Breitman and Pierre Deladonchamps) Fatima – Philippe Faucon: L'Affaire SK1 – David Oelhoffen and Frédéric Tellier; Macadam Stories – Samuel Benchetrit; The Clearstream Affair – Stéphane Cabel and Vincent Garenq; Diary of a Chambermaid – Benoît Jacquot and Hélène Zimmer
Best First Feature Film (presented by Jean-Hugues Anglade) Mustang - Deniz Gamze Ergüven: L'Affaire SK1 - Frédéric Tellier; Cowboys - Thomas Bidegain; The Wakhan Front - Clément Cogitore; All Three of Us - Kheiron	Best Cinematography (presented by Déborah François) Christophe Offenstein – Valley of Love: Eponine Momenceau – Dheepan; Glynn Speeckaert – Marguerite; David Chizallet and Ersin Gök – Mustang; Irina Lubtchansky – My Golden Days
Best Editing (presented by Jérôme Commandeur) Mathilde Van de Moortel – Mustang: Juliette Welfling – Dheepan; Cyril Nakache – Marguerite; Simon Jacquet – Mon roi; Laurence Briaud – My Golden Days	Best Sound (presented by Audrey Lamy) François Musy and Gabriel Hafner – Marguerite: Daniel Sobrino, Valérie Deloof and Cyril Holtz – Dheepan; Nicolas Provost, Agnès Ravez and Emmanuel Croset – Mon roi; Ibrahim Gök, Damien Guillaume and Olivier Goinard – Mustang; Nicolas Cantin, Sylvain Malbrant and Stéphane Thiébaut – My Golden Days
Best Original Music (presented by Christopher Lambert and Éric Serra) Warren Ellis – Mustang: Raphaël Haroche – Cowboys; Ennio Morricone – En mai, fais ce qu'il te plaît; Stephen Warbeck – Mon roi; Grégoire Hetzel – My Golden Days	Best Costume Design (presented by Grégoire Ludig and David Marsais) Pierre-Jean Larroque – Marguerite: Anaïs Romand – Diary of a Chambermaid; Selin Sözen – Mustang; Catherine Leterrier – L'Odeur de la mandarine; Nathalie Raoul – My Golden Days
Best Production Design (presented by Jonathan Cohen) Martin Kurel – Marguerite: Michel Barthélémy – Dheepan; Katia Wyszkop – Diary of a Chambermaid; Jean Rabasse – L'Odeur de la mandarine; Toma Baquéni – My Golden Days	Best Documentary Film (presented by Guillaume Gouix and Karidja Touré) Tomorrow (Demain): The Pearl Button; Cavanna, jusqu'à l'ultime seconde, j'écrirai; The Missing Picture; Une jeunesse allemande
Best Animated Feature Film (presented by Hippolyte Girardot) The Little Prince: Adama; April and the Extraordinary World	Best Animated Short Film (presented by Hippolyte Girardot) Sunday Lunch: La Nuit américaine d'Angélique; Sous tes doigts; Tigre à la queu leu leu
Best Short Film (presented by Nicolas Duvauchelle) Back Alley: The Last of the Frenchmen; Essaie de mourir jeune; Guy Môquet; Mon héros	Best Foreign Film (presented by Kristin Scott Thomas) Birdman: Son of Saul; I'm Dead but I Have Friends; Mia Madre; Taxi; The Brand New Testament; Youth
Honorary César (presented by Claude Lelouch) Michael Douglas

=== Performer ===
Name(s)	Performed
Christine and the Queens	"It's Only Mystery" from the film Subway

== Multiple nominations and awards ==
The following films received multiple nominations:

Nominations	Film
11	Marguerite
11	My Golden Days
9	Dheepan
9	Mustang
8	Standing Tall
8	Mon roi
4	Fatima
4	Cowboys
3	Diary of a Chambermaid
3	The Measure of a Man
3	Valley of Love
2	L'Affaire SK1
2	Summertime
2	Courted
2	L'Odeur de la mandarine

The following films received multiple awards:

Awards	Film
4	Marguerite
4	Mustang
3	Fatima
2	Standing Tall

== Viewers ==
The show was followed by 2.5 million viewers. This corresponds to 11.9% of the audience.

== See also ==
- 21st Lumière Awards
- 6th Magritte Awards
- 28th European Film Awards
- 88th Academy Awards
- 69th British Academy Film Awards
- 31st Goya Awards
- 61st David di Donatello
