= Michel Fau =

French actor (born 1964)

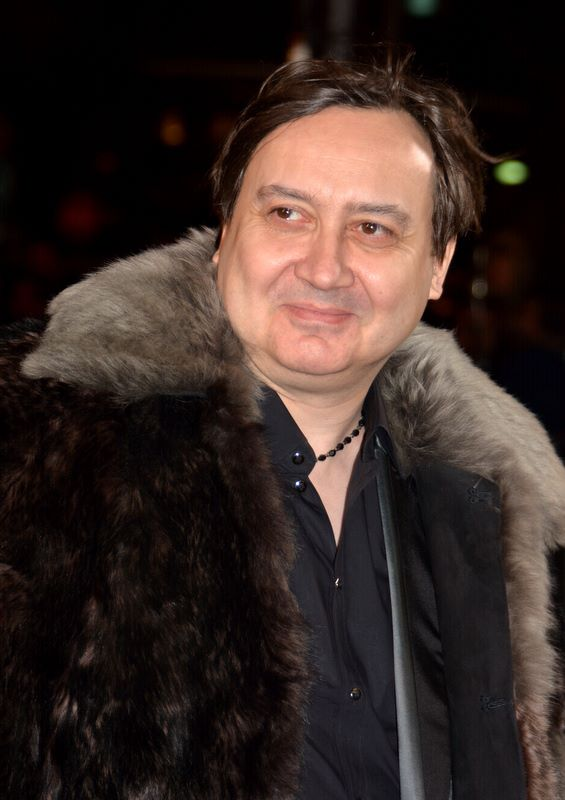
- Michel Fau at the 41st César Awards in 2016
- Born: 1964 (age 61–62); Agen, France
- Occupations: Actor, comedian, theatre director
- Years active: 1984–present

Michel Fau (born 1964) is a French comedian, actor and theatre director.

== Personal life ==
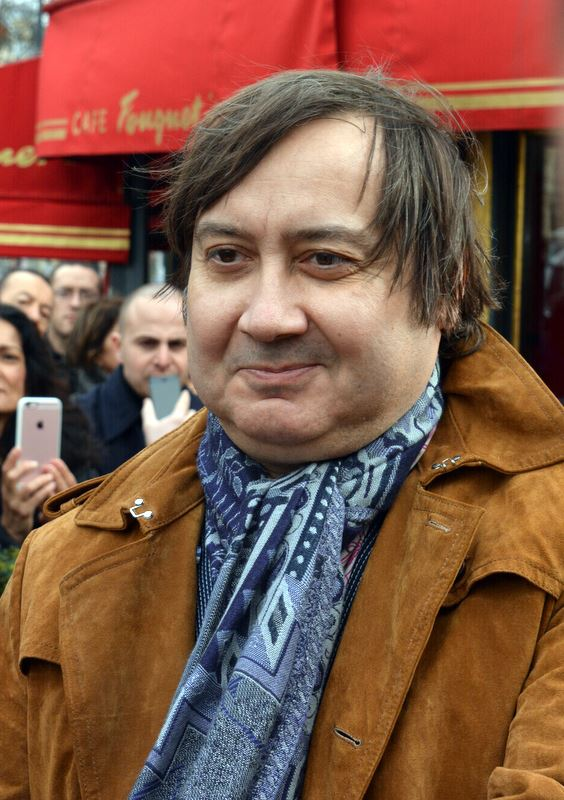
Michel Fau in 2016

At 18, he left his hometown for training at French National Academy of Dramatic Arts from 1986 to 1989. He trained with Michel Bouquet, Gerard Desarthe and Pierre Vial.

He has appeared on stage regularly in works directed by Olivier Py and he also worked with Olivier Desbordes, Jean Sébastien Rajon, Pierre Guillois, Jean-Luc Lagarce, Jean-Michel Rabeux, Jean-Claude Penchenat, Laurent Gutmann, Stéphane Braunschweig, Jacques Weber, Sandrine Kiberlain, Léa Drucker, Gaspard Ulliel, Julie Depardieu, Charlotte de Turckheim, Chantal Ladesou, Catherine Frot, Samir Guesmi, ...

In cinema, he worked with directors like Jean-Paul Rappeneau, Gilles Bourdos, Albert Dupontel, Dominik Moll, François Ozon, Benoît Jacquot, Noémie Lvovsky, Nina Companeez, Jean-Michel Ribes, Xavier Giannoli, Christophe Honoré, Josée Dayan, and André Téchiné.

He occasionally directs an interpretation workshop at the French National Academy of Dramatic Arts.

During the night of the 2011 Molière Award, he made a cover of Carla Bruni's song "Quelqu'un m'a dit" in a parody of a classical singer.

== Filmography ==
Year	Title	Role	Director	Notes
1990	Cyrano de Bergerac	Ragueneau's Poet	Jean-Paul Rappeneau	
1993	Relâche	The young actor	Gilles Bourdos	Short
1993	Le Don		David Delrieux	TV movie
1997	Le JT, petit opéra		Philippe Béziat	Short
1999	The Creator	Nicolas	Albert Dupontel	
2000	Harry, He's Here to Help	Eric	Dominik Moll	
2000	Les yeux fermés	Michel	Olivier Py	TV movie
2002	Le petit vélo dans la tête		Fabrice Fouquet	Short
2003	Swimming Pool	First Man	François Ozon	
2005	Foon	Miss Petchers	Benoît Pétré, Mika Tard, ...	
2005	Marie Antoinette	Louis XVI	Alain Brunard	TV movie
2005	Marc Eliot	Gregory Fontaine	Patrick Jamain	TV series (1 episode)
2006	Gaspard le bandit	Riboux	Benoît Jacquot	TV movie
2007	Let's Dance	The psychiatrist	Noémie Lvovsky	
2007	Un train de retard	Eric	Jeanne Gottesdiener	Short
2007	Un nouveau contrat	The Mechanic	Christophe Leraie	Short
2011	Requiem pour une tueuse	The Conductor	Jérôme Le Gris	
2011	À la recherche du temps perdu	Jupien	Nina Companeez	TV mini-series
2013	9 Month Stretch	The gynecologist	Albert Dupontel	
2014	Brèves de comptoir	The writer	Jean-Michel Ribes	
2015	Marguerite	Atos Pezzini / Divo	Xavier Giannoli	Nominated - César Award for Best Supporting Actor
2015	Arletty, une passion coupable	Sacha Guitry	Arnaud Sélignac	TV movie
2016	Open at Night	Bar manager	Édouard Baer	
2016	Sophie's Misfortunes	Father Huc	Christophe Honoré	
2016	Capitaine Marleau	Marc Durieux	Josée Dayan	TV series (1 episode)
2017	Golden Years	Samuel	André Téchiné	
2017	Ordalie	Karl Kaplan	Sacha Barbin	Short
2018	Paris Pigalle	Maurice Vogel	Cédric Anger	
2018	Alien Crystal Palace	Hambourg	Arielle Dombasle	
2018	The Most Assassinated Woman in the World	André	Franck Ribière	
2019	Amor maman	Michel	Roland Menou	Short
2020	La fuite	The uncle	Aurélien Gabrielli	Short
2020	I Love You Coiffure	Patrick	Muriel Robin	TV movie
2022	Habib, la grande aventure	The director	Aurélien Gabrielli	
2022	Diane de Poitiers	Gabriel Antoine Le Camus	Josée Dayan	TV mini-series
2023	Borgo	The inspector	Stéphane Demoustier	
2023	The Crime Is Mine	Maurice Vrai	François Ozon	
2023	Les secrets de la princesse de Cadignan	Honoré de Balzac	Arielle Dombasle	
2023	Capitaine Marleau	Claude	Josée Dayan	TV series (1 episode)
2025	The Great Arch (L'Inconnu du Grande Arche)	François Mitterrand	Stéphane Demoustier	

== Theater ==
Year	Title	Author	Director	Notes
1984	Taches d’encre	Isabelle Allard	Isabelle Allard	
1984	La Mort de Marthe	Attilio Cossu	Attilio Cossu	
1985	Creditors	August Strindberg	Michel Fau	
1985	Thérèse Raquin	Émile Zola	Michel Fau	Played Camille
1985	Measure for Measure	William Shakespeare	Régis Braun	(in french) played Angelo
1986	Creditors	August Strindberg	Michel Fau	
1986	Le Préjugé vaincu	Pierre de Marivaux	Éric Sadin	
1987	Le Ça et le vent	Viorel Stéphan	Philippe Honoré	
1988	Le Ventre	Jean-Michel Rabeux	Michel Fau	
1988	Après la pluie, le beau temps	Countess of Ségur	Philippe Honoré	
1988-90	The Misanthrope	Molière	Jacques Weber	Played Alceste
1989	La Vie parisienne	Jacques Offenbach	Pierre Vial	
1990	Fragments d’une lettre d’adieu lus par des géologues	Normand Chaurette	Gabriel Garran	
1990	La Femme abandonnée	Stéphane Auvray-Nauroy	Stéphane Auvray-Nauroy	
1991	Tableaux Impossibles	Jan Voss	Gilberte Tsaï	
1991	La Déploration	Eugène Durif	Philippe Honoré	
1992	Phèdre	Jean Racine	Stéphane Auvray-Nauroy	
1992	La Baïxada	Eric Sadin	Michel Fau	
1992	La Désillusion	Frédéric Constant & Michel Fau	Michel Fau	
1992	Les Aventures de Paco Goliard	Olivier Py	Olivier Py	
1993	Romeo and Juliet	William Shakespeare	Pierre Guillois	
1993	Il est trop tard	Stéphane Auvray-Nauroy	Stéphane Auvray-Nauroy	
1994	The New Menoza	Jakob Michael Reinhold Lenz	Laurent Gutmann	
1995	La Panoplie du squelette	Olivier Py	Olivier Py	
1995	La Cagnotte	Eugène Labiche	Jean-Luc Lagarce	Played Sylvain
1995	La Servante	Olivier Py	Olivier Py	
1996	Love's Labours Lost	William Shakespeare	Jean-Claude Penchenat	(in french) Played Biron
1996	Ce qui est resté d’un Rembrandt	Jean Genet	Laurent Gutmann	
1996	Les Décors sont de Roger H.	Laurent Gutmann	Laurent Gutmann	
1996	Miss Knife et sa baraque chantante	Olivier Py	Olivier Py	
1997	L'Architecte et la forêt Pastorale noire	Olivier Py	Olivier Py	
1997-98	Le Visage d’Orphée	Olivier Py	Olivier Py	
1998	Hyènes	Christian Siméon	Jean Macqueron	Prix Gérard Philipe
1999	Athalie	Jean Racine	Jean Gillibert	
1999	The Merchant of Venice	William Shakespeare	Stéphane Braunschweig	(in french) played Bassanio
1999	Der Silbersee	Kurt Weill	Olivier Desbordes	
1999-2000	Meurtres hors champ	Eugène Durif	Jean-Michel Rabeux	
2000	American Buffalo	David Mamet	Michel Fau	
2000	Edmond	David Mamet	Pierre Laville	
2000	Pelléas and Mélisande	Maurice Maeterlinck	Pierre Guillois	
2000-01	L’Apocalypse joyeuse	Olivier Py	Olivier Py	
2002	L’Homosexuel ou la difficulté de s’exprimer	Copi	Jean-Michel Rabeux	
2003	Le Soulier de satin	Paul Claudel	Olivier Py	Played L'annoncier, l'ange gardien, l'irrépressible, l'actrice
2004	Orphée 3	Pier Paolo Pasolini & Eugénio de Andrade	Michel Fau	
2004	The Love for Three Oranges	Sergei Prokofiev	Philippe Calvario	
2004	Feu l'amour ! / On purge bébé / Léonie est en avance / Hortense a dit J'm'en fous !	Georges Feydeau	Jean-Michel Rabeux	
2004	Dédé	Albert Willemetz & Henri Christiné	Olivier Desbordes	Played Robert Dauvergne
2005	The Robbers	Friedrich Schiller	Paul Desvaux	
2005	The Balcony	Jean Genet	Sébastien Rajon	
2006	Eugene Onegin	Pyotr Ilyich Tchaikovsky	Michel Fau	Directed production at Grand-Théâtre, Dijon
2006	L'Énigme Vilar	Jean Vilar	Olivier Py	
2006	Die Entführung aus dem Serail	Wolfgang Amadeus Mozart	Olivier Desbordes	
2006-07	Illusions comiques	Olivier Py	Olivier Py	Prix du Syndicat de la critique - Best Actor
2007	Symposium	Plato	Juliette Deschamps	
2007	Madama Butterfly	Giacomo Puccini	Michel Fau	
2007	Bastien und Bastienne	Wolfgang Amadeus Mozart	Michel Fau	
2007-08	L'Ignorant et le fou	Thomas Bernhard	Emmanuel Daumas	
2008	Oresteia	Aeschylus	Olivier Py	
2008-09	Othello	William Shakespeare	Éric Vigner	
2009	Le Soulier de satin	Paul Claudel	Olivier Py	
2009	Illusions comiques	Olivier Py	Olivier Py	
2009	Les Enfants de Saturne	Olivier Py	Olivier Py	
2009	Le Rosier de Madame Husson	Guy de Maupassant	Michel Fau	
2010	L'Impardonnable Revue pathétique et dégradante de Monsieur Fau	Michel Fau	Emmanuel Daumas	
2010-11	Nono	Sacha Guitry	Michel Fau	Directed and played Robert Chapelle
2010-11	A Doll's House	Henrik Ibsen	Michel Fau	
2011	Une visite inopportune	Copi	Philippe Calvario	
2011	Britannicus	Jean Racine	Michel Fau	Directed and played Néron
2011-12	Courteline en dentelles	Georges Courteline	Jérôme Deschamps	
2011-12	Récital emphatique	Michel Fau	Michel Fau	
2012	Entertaining Mr Sloane	Joe Orton	Michel Fau	Directed and played Eddie
2013	Demain il fera jour	Henry de Montherlant	Michel Fau	
2013	Ciboulette	Reynaldo Hahn	Michel Fau	Opéra-Comique, Paris (also played La comtesse de Castiglione). Issued on DVD by FRA-Musica and Naxos
2014	The Misanthrope	Molière	Michel Fau	Nominated - Molière Award for Best Actor; Nominated - Molière Award for Best Director
2014	Brûlez-la! Zelda la Magnifique	Christian Siméon	Michel Fau	
2015	Cactus Flower	Pierre Barillet & Jean-Pierre Gredy	Michel Fau	Nominated - Molière Award for Best Actor; Nominated - Molière Award for Best Play; Nominated - Molière Award for Best Director; Nominated - Molière Award for Best Comedy
2015	Dardanus	Jean-Philippe Rameau	Michel Fau	Bordeaux Opera; Grand prix du meilleur spectacle lyrique du Syndicat de la critique. Issued on DVD by Harmonia Mundi
2015-16	Un amour qui ne finit pas	André Roussin	Michel Fau	Prix du Brigadier
2016	Par-delà les marronniers	Jean-Michel Ribes	Jean-Michel Ribes	Played Arthur Cravan
2016	Peau de vache	Pierre Barillet & Jean-Pierre Gredy	Michel Fau	
2017	Tartuffe	Molière	Michel Fau	
2017	Cactus Flower	Pierre Barillet & Jean-Pierre Gredy	Michel Fau	
2018	Douce amère	Jean Poiret	Michel Fau	
2018	Fric-Frac	Édouard Bourdet	Michel Fau	
2019	La belle Hélène	Jacques Offenbach	Michel Fau	
2019	Ariadne auf Naxos	Richard Strauss	Michel Fau	Théâtre du Capitole, Toulouse
2019	Le postillon de Lonjumeau	Adolphe Adam	Michel Fau	Director (also played Madame Rose) at the Opéra-Comique, Paris. Issued on DVD by Naxos
2020	Betrayal	Harold Pinter	Michel Fau	
2020	George Dandin ou le Mari confondu	Molière	Michel Fau	Played title role and directed; at Versailles and the Théâtre de l'Athénée
2021	Wozzeck	Alban Berg	Michel Fau	
2021	Qu'est-il arrivé à Bette Davis et Joan Crawford ?	Jean Marbœuf	Michel Fau	
2022	Lorsque l'enfant paraît	André Roussin	Michel Fau	Nominated - Molière Award for Best Actor; Nominated - Molière Award for Best Director; Nominated - Molière Award for Best Comedy
2023	Zémire et Azor	André Grétry	Michel Fau	Opéra Comique Paris and Tourcoing Théâtre Municipal Raymond Devos
2023	Le Vison voyageur	Ray Cooney & John Chapman	Michel Fau	
2023	Piège pour un homme seul	Robert Thomas	Michel Fau	
2025	Der fliegende Holländer	Richard Wagner	Michel Fau	Théâtre du Capitole, Toulouse
