= Mustang (film) =

2015 film

- Theatrical release poster
- Directed by: Deniz Gamze Ergüven
- Written by: Deniz Gamze Ergüven; Alice Winocour
- Produced by: Charles Gillibert
- Starring: Güneş Nezihe Şensoy; Doğa Zeynep Doğuşlu; Tuğba Sunguroğlu; Elit İşcan; İlayda Akdoğan; Nihal Koldaş; Ayberk Pekcan
- Cinematography: David Chizallet; Ersin Gok
- Edited by: Mathilde Van de Moortel
- Music by: Warren Ellis
- Distributed by: Ad Vitam
- Release dates: 19 May 2015 (Cannes); 17 June 2015 (France)
- Running time: 97 minutes
- Countries: France; Germany; Turkey
- Language: Turkish
- Budget: $1.3 million
- Box office: $4.9 million

Mustang is a 2015 drama film co-written and directed by Deniz Gamze Ergüven in her feature debut. Set at an unspecified time in the 2010s in a remote Turkish village, Mustang depicts the lives of five young orphaned sisters and the challenges they face growing up with extended family as girls in a conservative society. Mustang is an international co-production of France, Germany and Turkey.

It premiered at the Directors' Fortnight section of the 2015 Cannes Film Festival, where it won the Europa Cinemas Label Award. Mustang was selected as France's submission and was nominated for the Best Foreign Language Film at the 88th Academy Awards. It received nine nominations at the 41st César Awards and won four, for First Feature Film, Original Screenplay, Editing and Original Music. Mustang has received widespread critical praise.

== Plot ==
Lale, the youngest of five sisters, bids farewell at school to her teacher, who is moving to Istanbul. The sisters decide to walk home instead of taking a van. En route, they play a game of "chicken fight" at the beach with their male classmates. At home, their grandmother hits them for having bodily contact with boys and thus "pleasuring themselves" with them. Their uncle Erol is equally furious. From then on, the girls are forbidden from leaving the house.

Their grandmother tries to make them suitable for marriage. When in public, they must now dress in drab, conservative clothing. Instead of attending school, they must stay home and learn how to cook, clean, and sew from their female relatives. Even so, the oldest sister, Sonay, sneaks out occasionally to meet her lover.

Lale, who loves football, is forbidden from attending Trabzonspor matches. She resolves to go to a match from which men have been banned due to hooliganism. She learns that the girls in the village are going together on a bus. The sisters, who want an opportunity to leave the house, sneak out with Lale. After missing the bus, they hitch a ride with a passing truck driver, Yasin, who helps them catch up to it. They enjoy the atmosphere of the all-female crowd cheering for their team. Their aunt sees them at the match on TV just as Erol and other village men are about to tune in. To prevent them from finding out, she cuts the house's and then the whole village's electricity.

When the girls return, their grandmother decides to start marrying the sisters off to get them settled. They are taken to town, ostensibly "to get lemonade," to show them off to potential suitors. A suitor soon appears. Sonay vows to marry only her lover and refuses to meet the prospective suitor and his family. Selma is sent instead and becomes engaged. Sonay gets engaged a short while later to her lover. At the two sisters' joint wedding, Sonay is happy while Selma is not. On the night of her wedding, Selma's in-laws come to view the bedsheets in a traditional ritual to establish that Selma was a virgin before her wedding night. Because there is no blood on the sheet, her in-laws take her to a physician to have her virginity tested.

Next in line for marriage is Ece, who is being sexually abused at night by Erol. When the three remaining girls stop with Erol near a bank, Ece allows a boy to have sexual contact with her in the car. Back home, she makes jokes at the lunch table, causing her sisters to laugh loudly, and is told to go to her room. There, she dies by suicide. Her whole family attends the funeral.

The two youngest sisters, Nur and Lale, remain trapped in their home. Lale continues to sneak out. On one attempt to walk to Istanbul alone, she encounters Yasin, who is kind to her. At Lale's request, he teaches her how to drive. When she is caught returning to the house, her family reinforces their efforts to make it impossible for the girls to leave, putting bars on the windows to prevent escape.

Erol starts abusing Nur, and her grandmother knows about it. She says that now it is time for Nur to be married off. Despite being young, she is found a suitor and engaged to be married. On the night of the ceremony, Lale convinces her to resist, and the girls bar themselves inside the house while the wedding party is outside, much to the embarrassment of their family. As the party disperses, Erol tries to get inside.

Lale finds a phone hidden in a cupboard and plugs it in to call Yasin for help. The girls gather up money and some supplies, grab Erol's car keys, and sneak out of the house. They manage to escape but crash the car close to their house. Yasin later picks them up and takes them to a bus station. The girls take the bus to Istanbul and find their former teacher, who greets them warmly.

== Cast ==
- Güneş Şensoy as Lale
- Doğa Doğuşlu as Nur
- Elit İşcan as Ece
- Tuğba Sunguroğlu as Selma
- İlayda Akdoğan as Sonay
- Nihal Koldaş as the grandmother
- Ayberk Pekcan as Erol
- Erol Afşin as Osman

== Production ==
After graduating from La Fémis film school in 2006, Ergüven was initially developing a film about the 1992 Los Angeles riots. It was later made and released as Kings in 2017. In 2011, she was invited to the Cinéfondation workshop at the Cannes Film Festival to pitch the project.

There she met Alice Winocour, who was pitching her film, Augustine. She subsequently put Kings on hold and wrote Mustang with Winocour over the summer of 2012. The event of girls being reprimanded for sitting on boys' shoulders, as depicted early in the film, was based on Ergüven's own experience as a teenager.

Of the five girls who played the main sisters, only Elit İşcan had acted before. Ergüven wrote her role, Ece, with İşcan in mind. Tuğba Sunguroğlu was discovered and recruited by Ergüven at the baggage claim of Charles de Gaulle Airport after a flight from Istanbul to Paris. The other three, Güneş Şensoy, Doğa Doğuşlu, and İlayda Akdoğan, were cast through audition among hundreds.

The film was a co-production between France, Germany, and Turkey, with a budget of €1.4 million. Weeks before shooting was scheduled to begin, a leading French producer pulled out of the film. She cited a shortage of funds as the main reason, and Ergüven's pregnancy, which the director had discovered a week before. A few days later, Charles Gillibert came on board as producer.

The film was shot in and around the Black Sea coastal town of İnebolu, 600 kilometers from Istanbul. The football scene was performed at an actual match, which no adult men were allowed to attend so that women might see it. The filmmakers were denied filming the match at the last minute, so they used images from the station that televised the match. They told station personnel about the problem.

The film's score was Warren Ellis's first to compose by himself. Ergüven approached Ellis, who initially turned it down due to a busy schedule, but was eventually persuaded.

== Release ==
Mustang premiered at the Directors' Fortnight section of the 2015 Cannes Film Festival on 19 May 2015. In France, it was released on 17 June 2015 and had 505,223 admissions. In Turkey, it was released on 23 October 2015 and had 25,419 admissions. It was selected for screening in the Special Presentations section of the 2015 Toronto International Film Festival.

== Reception ==
Mustang has received widespread acclaim from critics. On Rotten Tomatoes, the film has a rating of 97%, based on 156 reviews, with an average rating of 8.14/10. The site's critical consensus reads, "Mustang delivers a bracing — and thoroughly timely — message whose power is further bolstered by the efforts of a stellar ensemble cast." Metacritic reports a score of 83 out of 100, based on 29 reviews, indicating "universal acclaim".

For Variety, Jay Weissberg compared it to The Virgin Suicides. He criticized the voiceover narration as redundant while praising the direction of performances. IndieWire critic Jessica Kiang gave it a B, as "less a cultural critique, and more a bittersweet, often angry lament for childhoods ended before childhood has actually ended". Screen Daily's Tim Grierson found difficulty distinguishing among the sister characters but enjoyed their unity. Richard Brody wrote that Ergüven "gets appealing and fiercely committed performances from the five young actresses at the story’s center, but above all she effectively stokes righteous anger at a situation that admits no clear remedy other than mere escape".

In The Daily Telegraph, Tristram Fane Saunders awarded the film four stars and identified its voice as "fierce, confident and rebellious". The Guardian's Wendy Ide gave it five stars, citing it for "rebellious spirit". Ty Burr called it "an excellent first film" that condemns the treatment of women in Anatolia villages.

In Turkey, the reaction to Mustang was polarized. While critics such as Atilla Dorsay praised the film, it was criticized as depicting Turkish culture in inaccurate or orientalist ways.

=== Accolades ===
Award / Film Festival	Category	Recipients and nominees	Result
Academy Awards	Best Foreign Language Film	France	Nominated
Austin Film Critics Association	Best Foreign-Language Film		Nominated
Austin Film Critics Association	Best First Film		Nominated
Australian Film Critics Association	Best International Film (Foreign Language)	Mustang	Won
Belgian Film Critics Association	Grand Prix		Nominated
Cannes Film Festival	Europa Cinemas Label		Won
Cannes Film Festival	Caméra d'Or	Deniz Gamze Ergüven	Nominated
Cannes Film Festival	Queer Palm		Nominated
César Awards	Best Film		Nominated
César Awards	Best Director	Deniz Gamze Ergüven	Nominated
César Awards	Best Original Screenplay	Deniz Gamze Ergüven and Alice Winocour	Won
César Awards	Best First Feature Film		Won
César Awards	Best Cinematography	David Chizallet and Ersin Gök	Nominated
César Awards	Best Editing	Mathilde Van de Moortel	Won
César Awards	Best Sound	Ibrahim Gök, Damien Guillaume and Olivier Goinard	Nominated
César Awards	Best Original Music	Warren Ellis	Won
César Awards	Best Costume Design	Selin Sözen	Nominated
Critics' Choice Awards	Best Foreign Language Film		Nominated
Dallas–Fort Worth Film Critics Association	Best Foreign Language Film		4th place
European Film Awards	European Film		Nominated
European Film Awards	European Discovery of the Year		Won
Florida Film Critics Circle	Best Foreign Language Film		Nominated
Glasgow Film Festival	Glasgow Film Festival Audience Award		Won
Golden Globe Awards	Best Foreign Language Film		Nominated
Goya Awards	Best European Film		Won
Independent Spirit Awards	Best International Film		Nominated
Louis Delluc Prize	Best First Film		Nominated
Lumière Awards	Best Film		Won
Lumière Awards	Best Female Revelation	Güneş Nezihe Şensoy, Doğa Zeynep Doğuşlu, Elit Işcan, Tuğba Sunguroğlu and Ilayda Akdoğan	Won
Lumière Awards	Best First Film		Won
Lumière Awards	Best Screenplay	Deniz Gamze Ergüven and Alice Winocour	Nominated
Lumière Awards	Best Cinematography	David Chizallet	Won
Lumière Awards	Best Music	Warren Ellis	Nominated
LUX Prize			Won
National Board of Review	NBR Freedom Of Expression		Won
Washington D.C. Area Film Critics Association	Best Foreign Language Film		Nominated
46th International Film Festival of India	Silver Peacock Award for Best Actress	Gunes Sensoy, Doga Doguslu, Tugba Sunguroglu, Elit Iscan and Ilayda Akdogan	Won
Online Film Critics Society	Best Foreign Language Film		Nominated
Polish Filmmakers' Association	Best Feature Movie		Won
Satellite Awards	Best Foreign Language Film		Nominated
Stockholm International Film Festival	Best Script	Deniz Gamze Ergüven and Alice Winocour	Won
Trophées du Film français	Duo révélation cinéma	Deniz Gamze Ergüven and Charles Gillibert	Won
Odesa International Film Festival	Grand Prix - Golden Duke		Won
Washington D.C. Area Film Critics Association	Best Foreign Language Film		Nominated

== See also ==
- List of submissions to the 88th Academy Awards for Best Foreign Language Film
- List of French submissions for the Academy Award for Best Foreign Language Film
