= Young Tiger (film) =

French drama film

- Film poster
- Directed by: Cyprien Vial
- Written by: Cyprien Vial
- Produced by: Isabelle Madelaine; Emilie Tisné
- Starring: Harmandeep Palminder
- Cinematography: Pierre Cottereau
- Edited by: Albertine Lastera
- Music by: Léonie Pernet
- Production companies: Dharamsala; Darius Films
- Distributed by: Haut et Court
- Release dates: 6 October 2014 (Namur); 14 January 2015 (France)
- Running time: 87 minutes
- Country: France
- Languages: French; Punjabi

Young Tiger (French title: Bébé Tigre) is a 2014 French drama film directed by Cyprien Vial and starring Harmandeep Palminder.

== Cast ==
- Harmandeep Palminder as Many
- Vikram Sharma as Kamal
- Elisabeth Lando as Elisabeth
- Bilal Baggad as Sami
- Billel Brima as Daniel
- Amandeep Singh as Sony
- Karim Leklou as Frédéric
- Aurore Broutin as Patricia
- Gérard Zingg as Gérard
- Marie Berto as the judge
- Navpreet Singh as Ranjit

== Accolades ==
| Award / Film Festival | Category | Recipients and nominees | Result |
|---|---|---|---|
| Louis Delluc Prize | Best First Film | | Nominated |
| Lumière Awards | Best Male Revelation | Harmandeep Palminder | Nominated |
| Lumière Awards | Best First Film | | Nominated |
