= Marguerite (2015 film) =

- Film poster
- Directed by: Xavier Giannoli
- Written by: Xavier Giannoli; Marcia Romano
- Produced by: Artemio Benki; Olivier Delbosc; Marc Missonnier
- Starring: Catherine Frot; André Marcon; Michel Fau; Christa Theret; Denis Mpunga; Sylvain Dieuaide; Aubert Fenoy; Sophia Leboutte; Théo Cholbi
- Cinematography: Glynn Speeckaert
- Edited by: Cyril Nakache
- Music by: Ronan Maillard
- Production companies: La Banque Postale 8; Canal+; CNC; Eurimages; Fidélité Films; France 3 Cinéma; France Télévisions; Scope Pictures; Sirena Film
- Distributed by: Memento Films Distribution (France); ArtCam (Czech Republic)
- Release dates: 4 September 2015 (Venice); 16 September 2015 (France); 24 September 2015 (Czech Republic)
- Running time: 128 minutes
- Countries: France; Czech Republic; Belgium
- Language: French
- Budget: $8.7 million
- Box office: $8.8 million

Marguerite is a 2015 French-language comedy-drama film directed by Xavier Giannoli and written by Giannoli and Marcia Romano, loosely inspired by the life of Florence Foster Jenkins. The film is an international co-production among France, the Czech Republic, and Belgium. Marguerite received eleven nominations at the 41st César Awards, winning for Best Actress, Best Costume Design, Best Sound, and Best Production Design.

== Plot ==
Set in the Golden Twenties, the film stars Catherine Frot as a wealthy woman who is an enthusiastic amateur singer and believes, wrongly, that she has a beautiful voice.

== Cast ==
- Catherine Frot as Marguerite Dumont
- André Marcon as Georges Dumont
- Denis Mpunga as Madelbos
- Michel Fau as Atos Pezzini / Divo
- Christa Theret as Hazel Klein
- Astrid Whettnall as Françoise Bellaire
- Sylvain Dieuaide as Lucien Beaumont
- Aubert Fenoy as Kyrill Von Priest
- Sophia Leboutte as Félicité La Barbue
- Théo Cholbi as Diego

== Production ==
The film was shot in Prague from mid-September to early December 2014 (from September 15 to November 19).

== Release ==
Marguerite was screened in the main competition section of the 72nd Venice International Film Festival.

== Reception ==
=== Critical response ===
The film was well received by the critics. Review aggregator Rotten Tomatoes gives the film an approval rating of 95%, based on 110 reviews, with an average rating of 7.5/10. The site's critical consensus reads, "Touching, funny, and thoughtful, Marguerite honors its real-life inspiration with a well-acted and ultimately inspirational look at the nature of art and the value of a dream." On Metacritic the film has a score of 76 out of 100, based on 25 critics, indicating "generally favorable reviews".

Screendaily described the film as "original, funny and touching". Jordan Mintzer of The Hollywood Reporter wrote that the film "offers up an amusingly entertaining portrait of fortune, infamy and severe melodic dysfunction". Cineuropa gave the film a positive review, and said that the director "has brought together the best of his sensitivity and attraction to characters that are passionate and obsessive to the extreme, to paint the portrait of an unusual woman, who Catherine Frot plays with stunning dramatic and comical genius".

=== Accolades ===
Award / Film Festival	Category	Recipients and nominees	Result
César Awards	Best Film		Nominated
César Awards	Best Director	Xavier Giannoli	Nominated
César Awards	Best Actress	Catherine Frot	Won
César Awards	Best Supporting Actor	Michel Fau	Nominated
César Awards	Best Supporting Actor	André Marcon	Nominated
César Awards	Best Original Screenplay	Xavier Giannoli	Nominated
César Awards	Best Cinematography	Glynn Speeckaert	Nominated
César Awards	Best Editing	Cyril Nakache	Nominated
César Awards	Best Sound	François Musy and Gabriel Hafner	Won
César Awards	Best Costume Design	Pierre-Jean Larroque	Won
César Awards	Best Production Design	Martin Kurel	Won
Louis Delluc Prize	Best Film		Nominated
Lumière Awards	Best Film		Nominated
Lumière Awards	Best Director	Xavier Giannoli	Nominated
Lumière Awards	Best Actress	Catherine Frot	Won
Lumière Awards	Best Screenplay	Xavier Giannoli	Nominated
Magritte Awards	Best Foreign Film in Coproduction		Nominated
Venice International Film Festival	Golden Lion		Nominated
Venice International Film Festival	P. Nazareno Taddei Award		Won

== See also ==
- Florence Foster Jenkins, a 2016 British-French film starring Meryl Streep as Jenkins.
