= The Treasure (2015 film) =

- Film poster
- Romanian: Comoara
- Directed by: Corneliu Porumboiu
- Written by: Corneliu Porumboiu
- Produced by: Marcela Ursu
- Starring: Toma Cuzin; Adrian Purcărescu; Corneliu Cozmei; Cristina Toma; Nicodim Toma; Florin Kevorkian
- Cinematography: Tudor Mircea
- Edited by: Roxana Szel
- Release date: 21 May 2015 (Cannes)
- Running time: 89 minutes
- Country: Romania
- Language: Romanian
- Box office: $19,119

The Treasure (Romanian: Comoara) is a 2015 Romanian film directed by Corneliu Porumboiu, starring Toma Cuzin, Adrian Purcărescu and Corneliu Cozmei. It tells the story of two young men who search for lost treasure. It was screened in the Un Certain Regard section at the 2015 Cannes Film Festival where it won the Prix Un Certain Talent.

== Cast ==
- Toma Cuzin as Costi
- Adrian Purcărescu as Adrian
- Corneliu Cozmei as Cornel
- Radu Banzaru as Vanzator
- Florin Kevorkian as Sef Costi
- Iulia Ciochina as Vanzatoare
- Cristina Toma as Raluca
- Dan Chiriac as Lica
- Laurentiu Lazar as Petrescu
- Clemence Valleteau as Emma Dumont

== Production ==
The film was produced through the director's company 42 km Film in collaboration with France's Les Films du Worso and Rouge International. It received grants corresponding to 350,000 euro from the Romanian National Film Center and support from Arte France Cinéma, HBO and Eurimages. With the exception of Toma Cuzin, the entire cast are non-professional actors. Filming took place from 15 October to 15 November 2014 in Teleorman County and Bucharest.
