= 21 Nights with Pattie =

- Film poster
- Directed by: Arnaud Larrieu; Jean-Marie Larrieu
- Written by: Arnaud Larrieu; Jean-Marie Larrieu
- Produced by: Bruno Pesery
- Starring: Isabelle Carré; Karin Viard; André Dussollier
- Cinematography: Yannick Ressigeac
- Edited by: Annette Dutertre
- Music by: Nicolas Repac
- Production companies: Aréna Films; Pyramide Productions
- Distributed by: Pyramide Distribution
- Release dates: 28 August 2015 (Angoulême); 25 November 2015 (France)
- Running time: 110 minutes
- Country: France
- Language: French
- Budget: $3.7 million
- Box office: $2.5 million

21 Nights with Pattie (original title: 21 nuits avec Pattie) is a 2015 French comedy-drama film written and directed by Arnaud and Jean-Marie Larrieu.

== Plot ==
A forty-two-year-old Parisian named Caroline comes to a small village in Southern France because she has to organise the funeral of her mother. Caroline, who didn't get along all too well with her deceased mother, finds a new friend in a local woman named Pattie who introduces her to local gossip. While the traditional mid-summer dance is about to take place, the corpse disappears.

== Cast ==
- Isabelle Carré as Caroline
- Karin Viard as Pattie
- André Dussollier as Jean
- Sergi López as Manuel
- Laurent Poitrenaux as Pierre
- Denis Lavant as André
- Philippe Rebbot as Jean-Marc
- Jules Ritmanic as Kamil
- Mathilde Monnier as Isabelle

== Accolades ==
Award / Film Festival	Category	Recipients and nominees	Result
César Awards	Best Supporting Actress	Karin Viard	Nominated
Lumière Awards	Best Actor	André Dussollier	Nominated
Lumière Awards	Best Screenplay	Arnaud and Jean-Marie Larrieu	Nominated
San Sebastián International Film Festival	Best Screenplay	Arnaud and Jean-Marie Larrieu	Won
