= Land and Shade =

2015 film

- Theatrical release poster
- Directed by: César Augusto Acevedo
- Written by: César Augusto Acevedo
- Produced by: Jorge Forero, Paola Pérez Nieto, Diana Bustamante
- Starring: Haimer Leal
- Cinematography: Mateo Guzmán
- Edited by: Miguel Schverdfinger
- Release date: 18 May 2015 (Cannes)
- Running time: 97 minutes
- Countries: Colombia; France; Netherlands; Chile; Brazil
- Language: Spanish

Land and Shade (Spanish: La tierra y la sombra) is a 2015 drama film written and directed by César Augusto Acevedo. It was screened in the Critics' Week section at the 2015 Cannes Film Festival where it won the Caméra d'Or, France 4 Visionary Award and SACD Award. The film has been in development since 2009 and has since received support and funding from several international institutions. It is a co-production between Colombia, France, the Netherlands, Chile and Brazil.

== Plot ==
Alfonso is an elderly farmer who returns after 17 years to the home he abandoned due to his only son suffering from a serious illness. Upon arriving, he finds that everything he once knew has vanished, as the monoculture of sugarcane has destroyed all the farms in the region. The only thing that remains almost unchanged, just as he remembered it, is his old home: the humble white house and the small bench under the shade of the old, imposing saman tree. Yet, despite these reminders stirring his memories, Alfonso must confront the reality that he returns as a stranger, for his family stopped waiting for him long ago.

His return will reignite old passions and resentments in the heart of Alicia, his ex-wife, who has always refused to leave her property, even though an invisible threat now weaves through the vast sugarcane fields, filling everything with signs of destruction and death. Realizing that his entire family is at great risk, Alfonso will try to reach them before it's too late, doing everything he can to save them—even if it means erasing all traces of his existence.

The story, memory, and identity of everyone are on the brink of disappearing under the weight of a paradoxical notion of progress, and only a great sacrifice will offer them the chance to reconcile and begin anew, far from the place where all hopes seem to have been lost.

== Cast ==
- Haimer Leal as Alfonso
- Hilda Ruiz as Alicia
- Edison Raigosa as Geraldo
- Marleyda Soto as Esperanza
- Felipe Cárdenas as Manuel

== Reception ==
The film received positive reviews from critics. Review aggregation website Rotten Tomatoes gives it a 93% approval rating, based on 14 reviews, with an average score of 7.9/10. On Metacritic, the film has a score of 74 out of 100 based on 11 critics. Noel Murray from The A.V. Club wrote: "Acevedo has a wonderful command of visual storytelling, as evidenced by how well he frames those dark interiors; he and Guzmán [his cameraman] use every spare beam of light to illuminate the edges of his characters". Adam Morgan from the Chicago Reader also gave a positive review from the film and its cinematography: "The film is beautifully composed and full of striking images, but Acevedo's ruthless depiction of hardship makes this hard to watch". Peter Debruge from Variety wrote: "Cesar Acevedo's deliberately paced and distant-feeling debut works its way under audiences' skin, weaving a haunting allegory through painterly compositions.".
