= Les Bêtises (film) =

2015 film

- Film poster
- Directed by: Alice Philippon; Rose Philippon
- Written by: Alice Philippon; Rose Philippon
- Produced by: Antoine Denis
- Starring: Jérémie Elkaïm; Sara Giraudeau; Jonathan Lambert; Anne Alvaro; Alexandre Steiger; Jacques Weber
- Cinematography: Nicolas Gaurin
- Edited by: Nicolas Desmaison
- Music by: Fred Avril
- Production companies: Asa Films; Rezo Productions
- Distributed by: Rezo Films
- Release dates: 10 June 2015 (Cabourg); 22 July 2015 (France)
- Running time: 79 minutes
- Country: France
- Language: French
- Budget: $2.1 million
- Box office: $490.000

Les Bêtises is a 2015 French comedy film written and directed by Rose and Alice Philippon.

== Synopsis ==
François is a dreamy, awkward man in his thirties. He has been adopted and is trying to contact his biological mother. She doesn't want to meet him. However, having managed to obtain her contact details, he decides to visit her anyway. Once there, he realizes that a party is being planned, so he takes advantage of the opportunity to pose as an extra, hired to serve the party, in order to approach his mother. But his awkwardness soon makes him stand out.

== Cast ==
- Jérémie Elkaïm as François
- Sara Giraudeau as Sonia
- Jonathan Lambert as Fabrice
- Anne Alvaro as Élise
- Alexandre Steiger as Philippe
- Jacques Weber as André
- Frédéric Pierrot as the civil servant
- Cécile Fisera as Young Élise
- Marie Seux as Irène
- Béatrice de Staël as Édith
- Yvon Wust as René

== Accolades ==
| Award / Film Festival | Category | Recipients and nominees | Result |
|---|---|---|---|
| César Awards | Most Promising Actress | Sara Giraudeau | Nominated |
| Lumière Awards | Best Female Revelation | Sara Giraudeau | Nominated |
