= All About Them =

- Film poster
- Directed by: Jérôme Bonnell
- Written by: Jérôme Bonnell; Maël Piriou
- Produced by: Edouard Weil; Genevieve Lemal
- Starring: Anaïs Demoustier; Félix Moati; Sophie Verbeeck
- Cinematography: Pascal Lagriffoul
- Edited by: Julie Dupré
- Music by: Mike Higbee
- Production companies: Rectangle Productions; Wild Bunch; France 3 Cinéma; Scope Pictures
- Distributed by: Wild Bunch Distribution
- Release date: 25 March 2015
- Running time: 86 minutes
- Countries: France; Belgium
- Language: French
- Budget: $4.6 million
- Box office: $805.000

All About Them (French title: À trois on y va) is a 2015 French romantic comedy film directed by Jérôme Bonnell. It stars Anaïs Demoustier, Félix Moati and Sophie Verbeeck.

== Plot ==
Micha and Charlotte are a couple who have recently bought a house near Lille. For the past few months, the two slowly drift apart and Charlotte starts cheating on Micha with their mutual friend Mélodie who works as a lawyer. Little does Charlotte know, Micha also starts cheating on her with the same person, Mélodie. Mélodie ends up falling in love with both of them while she becomes the secret lover of both Micha and Charlotte.

== Cast ==
- Anaïs Demoustier as Mélodie
- Félix Moati as Micha
- Sophie Verbeeck as Charlotte
- Patrick d'Assumçao as William
- Caroline Baehr as Aunt Estelle
- Claire Magnin as Lawyer Courtois
- Olivier Broche as The depressive
- Laure Calamy as The aggressive

== Accolades ==
Award / Film Festival	Category	Recipients	Result
Cabourg Film Festival	Best Actress	Anaïs Demoustier	Won
Cabourg Film Festival	Prix Premiers Rendez-vous	Sophie Verbeeck	Won
César Awards	Most Promising Actor	Félix Moati	Nominated
Lumière Awards	Best Male Revelation	Félix Moati	Nominated
Lumière Awards	Best Female Revelation	Sophie Verbeeck	Nominated
