= The Wakhan Front =

2015 film

- Film poster
- Directed by: Clément Cogitore
- Written by: Clément Cogitore; Thomas Bidegain (collaboration)
- Produced by: Jean-Christophe Reymond
- Starring: Jérémie Renier; Swann Arlaud; Marc Robert; Kévin Azaïs; Finnegan Oldfield; Clément Bresson; Sâm Mirhosseini
- Cinematography: Sylvain Verdet
- Edited by: Isabelle Manquillet
- Music by: Eric Bentz; François-Eudes Chanfrault
- Distributed by: Diaphana Films
- Release dates: 16 May 2015 (Cannes); 30 September 2015 (France); 7 October 2015 (Belgium)
- Running time: 100 minutes
- Countries: France; Belgium
- Languages: French; Persian
- Budget: €2.5 million
- Box office: $105,853

The Wakhan Front (French: Ni le ciel ni la terre) is a 2015 French war thriller drama film directed by Clément Cogitore. It was screened in the Critics' Week section at the 2015 Cannes Film Festival.

== Cast ==
- Jérémie Renier as Antares Bonnassieu
- Swann Arlaud as Jérémie Lernowski
- Marc Robert as Jean Baptiste Frering
- Kévin Azaïs as William Denis
- Finnegan Oldfield as Patrick Mercier
- Clément Bresson as Étienne Baxer
- Sâm Mirhosseini as Khalil Khan
- Christophe Tek as Stéphane Tek
- Steve Tientcheu as Oscar Varennes
- Patrick Ligardes as Officer Armenet
- Hamid Reza Javdan as Sultan
- Michaël Vander-Meiren as Philippe Le Thieur
- Kamal Ait Taleb as Basile Delcourt

== Production ==
The film was shot in the Atlas Mountains in Morocco.

== Accolades ==
Award / Film Festival	Category	Recipients and nominees	Result
Cannes Film Festival	Gan Foundation Support for Distribution		Won
Cannes Film Festival	Caméra d'Or	Clément Cogitore	Nominated
Cannes Film Festival	Queer Palm		Nominated
César Awards	Best First Feature Film		Nominated
French Syndicate of Cinema Critics	Best First French Film		Won
Louis Delluc Prize	Best First Film		Nominated
Lumière Awards	Best Actor	Jérémie Renier	Nominated
Lumière Awards	Best First Film		Nominated
Lumière Awards	Best Cinematography	Sylvain Verdet	Nominated
Magritte Awards	Best Actor	Jérémie Renier	Nominated
Magritte Awards	Best Foreign Film in Coproduction		Nominated
Motovun Film Festival	Propeller of Motovun		Won
