= Learn by Heart =

- Film poster
- Directed by: Mathieu Vadepied
- Written by: Mathieu Vadepied; Vincent Poymiro; Olivier Demangel
- Produced by: Bruno Nahon
- Starring: Alamine Touré; Ali Bidanessy; Guillaume Gouix
- Cinematography: Bruno Romiguière
- Edited by: Marie-Pierre Frappier
- Music by: Flemming Nordkrog
- Production companies: Unité de Production; Ten Films
- Distributed by: Gaumont
- Release dates: 22 May 2015 (Cannes); 16 September 2015 (France)
- Running time: 93 minutes
- Country: France
- Language: French

Learn by Heart (French: La Vie en grande) is a 2015 French comedy-drama film directed by Mathieu Vadepied. It was selected to close the Critics' Week section at the 2015 Cannes Film Festival.

== Cast ==
- Balamine Guirassy as Adama
- Ali Bidanessy as Mamadou
- Guillaume Gouix as Stanislas Mauger
- Joséphine de Meaux as The CPE
- Naidra Ayadi as The interim agent
- Idrissa Diabaté as Adama's brother
- Marion Ploquin as The Teacher
