= Microbe & Gasoline =

- Film poster
- Directed by: Michel Gondry
- Written by: Michel Gondry
- Produced by: Georges Bermann
- Starring: Ange Dargent; Théophile Baquet; Diane Besnier; Audrey Tautou
- Cinematography: Laurent Brunet
- Edited by: Elise Fievet
- Music by: Jean-Claude Vannier
- Production companies: Partizan; StudioCanal
- Distributed by: StudioCanal
- Release date: 8 July 2015
- Running time: 103 minutes
- Country: France
- Language: French
- Budget: $4.5 million
- Box office: $303,787

Microbe & Gasoline (French: Microbe et Gasoil) is a 2015 French comedy-drama film written and directed by Michel Gondry. The coming-of-age film follows the adventures of two teenagers who take a road trip in their self-assembled vehicle. The film stars newcomers Théophile Baquet and Ange Dargent along with Audrey Tautou. It was reviewed favorably by critics.

== Plot summary ==
Junior high friends Daniel ("Microbe") and Theo ("Gasoline") struggle to fit in at school, with the diminutive Daniel often the target of bullies. Laura, a taller classmate, has a crush on him, but both struggle to break the friend zone due to Daniel's social awkwardness with women. Theo is a similar misfit, far too analytical for his age.

The two teens also come from difficult homes: Theo's father is harsh and unemotional, while his mother suffers from poor health. Daniel's detached mother, Marie, mistakenly construes her son's longer hair and many friendships with girls as gender questioning.

On a whim, the two misfits decide to take a road trip across France, but lack a car and licenses to do so. Theo suggests they build a recreational vehicle powered by a lawnmower push power engine, and a chassis consisting of abandoned scraps. Daniel assuages Theo's concern about attracting attention by making the contraption double as a garden shed. The end product - while crudely built - is functional.

Daniel and Theo make observations on themselves and life throughout the trip, with an emphasis on sex and relationships. They also encounter various characters and situations along the way, some humorous (two police officers stopping to take selfies in front of the wheeled conveyance), while others are frightening (a childless, lonely couple attempting to hold the boys as captives), provocative (Daniel getting a haircut at a brothel run by the Korean mafia) or tense (gangsters connected to the brothel pursuing the boys for an inflated debt).

The duo fall out when Theo discovers Daniel's sole motivation for the trip was to impress Laura at her family's lakeside retreat. At about the same time, their make-shift vehicle is found charred, as authorities assumed it was part of a nearby gypsy settlement. Because the fire didn't damage the engine, the pair are able to operate the vehicle a little while longer until a descent towards a cliff forces them to ditch it. They ultimately get home by conning their way onto an airplane and train.

Upon arriving back to Versailles, the boys are met with hostility from their respective families: Theo's mother has died and his father decides to send his runaway son to a reformative institution in Grenoble. Daniel returns to school and is tested by one of his bullies. The tormentor remarks how Daniel has now become a better person without his only friend by his side. Daniel responds by putting a grappling hold around the ruffian's neck and punching him in the nose, a tactical move Theo taught him.

After being expelled from school, Laura notices Daniel leave the campus with his mother and calls out his name. However, he doesn't respond to her.

== Cast ==
- Théophile Baquet as Théo Leloir / Gasoil
- Ange Dargent as Daniel Guéret / Microbe
- Audrey Tautou as Marie-Thérèse Guéret
- Diane Besnier as Laura
- Vincent Lamoureux as Steve
- Agathe Peigney as Agathe
- Douglas Brosset as Oscar
- Charles Raymond as Kévin
- Ferdinand Roux-Balme as Simon
- Marc Delarue as Romain
- Ely Penh as the gang leader
- Jana Bittnerova as Madame Leloir
- Zimsky as Monsieur Leloir
- Fabio Zenoni as Monsieur Guéret
- Matthias Fortune Droulers as Théo's brother
- Sacha Bourdo as the Russian teacher
- Laurent Poitrenaux as the dentist
- Étienne Charry as the organiser
- Marie Berto as Carole Raoult

== Reception ==
On review aggregator website Rotten Tomatoes, 92% of 60 critics gave the film a positive review, with an average rating of 7.2/10. The website's critical consensus reads, "Microbe and Gasoline brings Michel Gondry's distinctive gifts to bear on an oft-told tale, with thoroughly charming results." Review aggregator Metacritic, which uses a weighted average, reports 75 out of 100 based on 20 critics, indicating "generally favorable reviews".

== Accolades ==
Award / Film Festival	Category	Recipients and nominees	Result
Lumière Awards	Best Music	Jean-Claude Vannier	Nominated
