= I Am a Soldier =

2015 film

- Promotional poster
- Directed by: Laurent Larivière
- Written by: Laurent Larivière; François Decodts
- Produced by: Dominique Besnehard; Michel Feller; Hubert Toint
- Starring: Louise Bourgoin; Jean-Hugues Anglade
- Cinematography: David Chizallet
- Edited by: Marie-Pierre Frappier
- Music by: Martin Wheeler
- Production companies: Mon Voisin Productions; Saga Film; Umedia
- Distributed by: Le Pacte (France)
- Release dates: 20 May 2015 (Cannes); 18 November 2015 (France)
- Running time: 97 minutes
- Countries: France; Belgium
- Language: French
- Budget: $3.6 million
- Box office: $110.052

I Am a Soldier (French: Je suis un soldat) is a 2015 French-Belgian drama film directed by Laurent Larivière, starring Louise Bourgoin and Jean-Hugues Anglade. Set in Roubaix, France, the film follows Sandrine, an unemployed young woman who finds herself initiated into the illegal trade of dog trafficking. It was screened in the Un Certain Regard section at the 2015 Cannes Film Festival.

The original title of the film is taken from the lyrics of the Johnny Hallyday song "Quand revient la nuit".

== Cast ==
- Louise Bourgoin as Sandrine
- Jean-Hugues Anglade as Henri
- Anne Benoît as Martine
- Laurent Capelluto as Pierre
- Nina Meurisse as Audrey
- Nathanaël Maïni as Tony
- Angelo Bison as Roberto
- Thomas Scimeca as Fabien
- Eva-Luuna Mathues as Lola

== Accolades ==
Award / Film Festival	Category	Recipients and nominees	Result
Cannes Film Festival	Palm DogManitarian award		Won
Cabourg Film Festival	Swann d'Or for Best Actress	Louise Bourgoin	Won
Cairo International Film Festival	Best Actress	Louise Bourgoin	Won
Lumière Awards	Best Cinematography	David Chizallet	Won
Magritte Awards	Best Supporting Actor	Laurent Capelluto	Nominated
