= Courted (film) =

2015 film

- Film poster
- Directed by: Christian Vincent
- Written by: Christian Vincent
- Produced by: Matthieu Tarot
- Starring: Fabrice Luchini; Sidse Babett Knudsen
- Cinematography: Laurent Dailland
- Edited by: Yves Deschamps
- Music by: Claire Denamur
- Production companies: Albertine Productions; France 2 Cinéma; Gaumont
- Distributed by: Gaumont Distribution
- Release dates: 6 September 2015 (Venice); 18 November 2015 (France)
- Running time: 98 minutes
- Country: France
- Language: French
- Budget: $7.3 million
- Box office: $7.5 million

Courted (French: L'Hermine) is a 2015 French drama film directed by Christian Vincent.

It was screened in the main competition section of the 72nd Venice International Film Festival where Fabrice Luchini won the Volpi Cup for Best Actor. At the 41st César Awards, Sidse Babett Knudsen won the César Award for Best Supporting Actress.

== Plot ==
Michel Racine is a feared president and judge of Assize Court, as strict with himself as with others. Everything changes when he meets Ditte when she's selected as a juror in a criminal trial over which he presides.

== Cast ==
- Fabrice Luchini as Michel Racine
- Sidse Babett Knudsen as Ditte Lorensen-Coteret
- Raphaël Ferret as Lieutenant Massimet
- Miss Ming as Jessica Marton
- Corinne Masiero as Marie-Jeanne Metzer
- Marie Rivière as Marie-Laure Racine
- Michaël Abiteboul as Lawyer Jourd'hui

== Accolades ==
Award / Film Festival	Category	Recipients and nominees	Result
César Awards	Best Actor	Fabrice Luchini	Nominated
César Awards	Best Supporting Actress	Sidse Babett Knudsen	Won
Lumière Awards	Best Film		Nominated
Lumière Awards	Best Actor	Fabrice Luchini	Nominated
Venice International Film Festival	Best Actor	Fabrice Luchini	Won
Venice International Film Festival	Best Screenplay Award	Christian Vincent	Won
Venice International Film Festival	Golden Lion		Nominated

== Reception ==
On Rotten Tomatoes, the film has an aggregate score of 91% based on 10 positive and 1 negative critic reviews.
