= Two Friends (2015 film) =

2015 French movie by Louis Garrel

- Film poster
- French: Les Deux Amis
- Directed by: Louis Garrel
- Screenplay by: Louis Garrel; Christophe Honoré
- Based on: The Moods of Marianne by Alfred de Musset
- Produced by: Anne-Dominique Toussaint
- Starring: Golshifteh Farahani; Vincent Macaigne; Louis Garrel
- Cinematography: Claire Mathon
- Edited by: Marie-Julie Maille
- Music by: Philippe Sarde
- Production companies: Les Films des Tournelles; Arte France Cinéma
- Distributed by: Ad Vitam Distribution
- Release dates: 18 May 2015 (Cannes); 23 September 2015 (France)
- Running time: 100 minutes
- Country: France
- Language: French
- Budget: €2.787.393; (≃$3.3 million)
- Box office: $125,812

Two Friends (French: Les Deux Amis) is a 2015 French romantic dramedy film directed by Louis Garrel in his feature debut, and co-written by Garrel and Christophe Honoré. The film is loosely based on the play The Moods of Marianne by Alfred de Musset. It was selected to screen in the Critics' Week section at the 2015 Cannes Film Festival.

== Plot ==
Mona, a prisoner on work release, meets Clément, a shy actor. Desperate to impress Mona, Clément recruits his extroverted friend, Abel, to help. When Mona becomes more interested in Abel, it sets off a conflict between the two friends. Meanwhile, Mona attempts to keep her past hidden.

== Cast ==
- Golshifteh Farahani as Mona
- Vincent Macaigne as Clément
- Louis Garrel as Abel
- Mahaut Adam as Colette
- Pierre Maillet as Le réceptionniste hôtel
- Rhizlaine El Cohen as La gérante
- Aymeline Valade as La femme station-service

== Release ==
The film had its world premiere at the Cannes Film Festival, during the Critics' Week, on 18 May 2015. It was nominated for two awards, including the Golden Camera award. It was first released in French theaters on 23 September 2015.

== Reception ==
=== Box office ===
Two Friends grossed $0 in North America and $125,812 worldwide, against a production budget of about $3.3 million.

=== Critical response ===
On French review aggregator AlloCiné, the film holds an average rating of 3.6 out of 5, based on 18 critics' reviews. Peter Debruge of Variety wrote that the film captures "a sense of genuine emotion many directors never accomplish in their entire careers". Jordan Mintzer of The Hollywood Reporter called it "a charming if not entirely convincing feature debut".

Jonathan Romney at Screen Daily says it was "Elegantly shot, the whole thing nevertheless seems at once thin and over-cooked: Philippe Sarde's lush orchestral score feels excess to requirements, given the intimate, ultimately claustrophobic scale of the drama."

Mubi writes, "The latest filmmaker in the Garrel dynasty, Philippe’s son Louis picks up the camera for this, his debut feature as writer-director. Co-written with his regular collaborator Christophe Honoré, Two Friends is a terrific 21st-century spin on the classic—and yes, French—love-triangle drama."

=== Accolades ===
Award / Film Festival	Category	Recipients and nominees	Result
Cannes Film Festival	Caméra d'Or	Louis Garrel	Nominated
Cannes Film Festival	Queer Palm		Nominated
Lumière Awards	Best Actor	Vincent Macaigne	Nominated
Lumière Awards	Best Female Revelation	Golshifteh Farahani	Nominated
Lumière Awards	Best First Film		Nominated
Lumière Awards	Best Cinematography	Claire Mathon	Nominated
