= Macadam Stories =

- Film poster
- Directed by: Samuel Benchetrit
- Screenplay by: Samuel Benchetrit; Gabor Rassov
- Based on: Les Chroniques de l'Asphalte (Volume I) by Samuel Benchetrit
- Produced by: Julien Madon; Eric Pujol
- Starring: Isabelle Huppert; Valeria Bruni Tedeschi; Gustave Kervern; Michael Pitt
- Cinematography: Pierre Aïm
- Edited by: Thomas Fernandez
- Music by: Raphaël
- Production companies: La Camera Deluxe; Maje Productions; Single Man Productions
- Distributed by: Paradis Films
- Release dates: 17 May 2015 (Cannes); 7 October 2015 (France)
- Running time: 100 minutes
- Country: France
- Languages: French, English, Arabic
- Box office: $880.180

Macadam Stories (French: Asphalte) is a 2015 French comedy-drama film written and directed by Samuel Benchetrit, and based on the first volume of Benchetrit's autobiography Les Chroniques de l'Asphalte. The film was selected to be screened in the Special Screenings section at the 2015 Cannes Film Festival.

== Plot ==
The elevator in the apartment complex breaks down and residents have to pay for the repair, but the dull middle-aged Sternkowitz, who lives on the first floor, refuses to pay for the repair. In the end, Sternkowitz was exempt from paying on the condition that he didn't use the elevator, but shortly after, he was injured and began using a wheelchair. Then, he secretly uses the elevator so that no one can see him, and goes out to buy food in the middle of the night in the vending machine of a hospital. However, when the night shift nurse finds him, he immediately lies and says: "I'm a photographer who is scouting locations". Attracted to her, he goes to see her at the hospital every night at recess. As they come close, Sternkowitz offers to take her picture, to which she agrees. One night, he decides to go to the hospital, but the elevator breaks down and he's unable to get out of it. Desperate, he manages to escape from the elevator and drags himself to the hospital. When their appointment has passed by and the nurse finally goes home from her night shift, Sternkowitz honestly confesses that he's not a photographer.

Teenage boy Charly lives with his mother, who is often away from home, and spends most of his time alone in a meaningless existence. One day, a middle-aged woman named Jeanne Meyer moves into the next flat. She used to be an actress, but now she has no roles and is totally depressed. At first, Jeanne dismisses Charly as an ordinary, irritating teenager. But as their friendship develops, he helps her to realize that her life and career are not over and Charly realizes that adults can be more than they seem.

The return capsule carrying astronaut John Mackenzie crash-lands on the roof of the apartment complex due to a mistake. Wanting to cover up the emergency, NASA asks Madame Hamida, an Algerian immigrant living on the top floor of the complex, to protect him for two days until he can be picked up. She treats him kindly, feeding him couscous, and lending him her son's room and clothes, while the latter is in jail. John doesn't understand French and Madame Hamida doesn't understand English. But despite the language barrier, they come to feel a mother and son affection for each other and part in sorrow when NASA arrives to retrieve him.

== Cast ==
- Isabelle Huppert as Jeanne Meyer
- Gustave Kervern as Sternkowitz
- Valeria Bruni Tedeschi as The Nurse
- Tassadit Mandi as Madame Hamida
- Jules Benchetrit as Charly
- Michael Pitt as John McKenzie
- Mickaël Graehling as Dédé
- Larouci Didi as Mouloud
- Thierry Gimenez as Monsieur Gilosa

== Production ==
Principal photography began on 15 December 2014 and wrapped on 6 February 2015. Shooting took place in Colmar (Haut-Rhin).

== Accolades ==
Award / Film Festival	Category	Recipients and nominees	Result
César Awards	Best Adaptation	Samuel Benchetrit	Nominated
Prix Jacques Prévert du Scénario	Best Adaptation	Samuel Benchetrit	Nominated
