= 2015 Cannes Film Festival =

- Official poster of the 68th Cannes Film Festival featuring a photo of Ingrid Bergman by David Seymour
- Opening film: Standing Tall
- Closing film: Ice and the Sky
- Location: Cannes, France
- Founded: 1946
- Awards: Palme d'Or: Dheepan
- Hosted by: Lambert Wilson
- No. of films: 19 (In Competition)
- Festival date: 13 – 24 May 2015
- Website: www.festival-cannes.com/en.html

Cannes Film Festival
- 2016 2014

The 68th Cannes Film Festival took place from 13 to 24 May 2015. Ethan and Joel Coen were the Co-Presidents of the Jury for the main competition, marking the first time that two people co-chaired the jury. Since the Coen brothers each received a separate vote, they were joined by seven other jurors to form the customary nine-juror panel.

French filmmaker Jacques Audiard won the Palme d'Or, the festival's top prize, for the drama film Dheepan. During his speech, Audiard stated that "receive a prize from the Coen brothers is something pretty exceptional. I'm very touched". French film director Agnès Varda was presented with the Honorary Palme d'Or at the festival's closing ceremony. She was the first female filmmaker to ever receive the award.

The festival's official poster featured Swedish actress Ingrid Bergman, photographed by David Seymour. The poster was chosen to pay tribute to Bergman for her contributions to films; she also served as the Jury President at 1973 Cannes Film Festival. Once again, French actor Lambert Wilson was the host for the opening and closing ceremonies.

The festival saw artistic director Thierry Frémaux ask celebrities to abstain from taking selfies on the red carpet. While he did not have the powers to ban the pictures from the red carpet altogether, Frémaux urged celebrities to resist the temptation.

The festival opened with Standing Tall by Emmanuelle Bercot, and closed with Ice and the Sky by Luc Jacquet.

== Juries ==
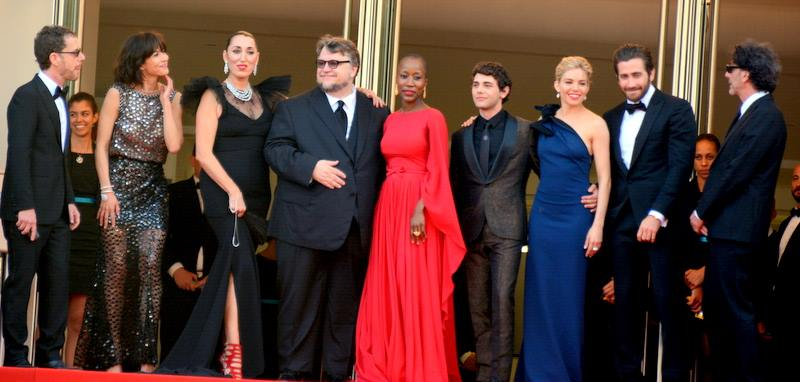
The main competition jury

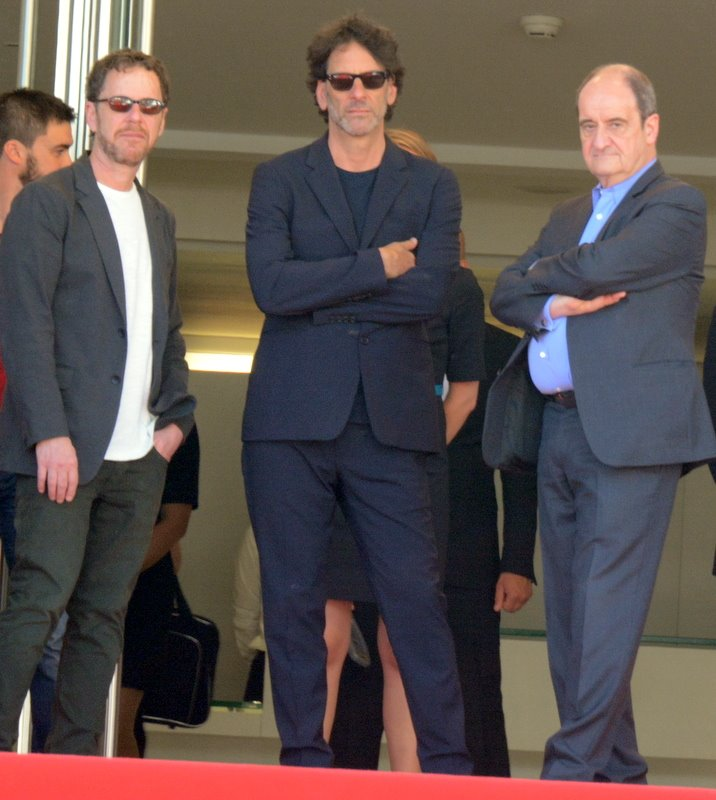
Ethan and Joel Coen, Main Jury Presidents, with Festival President Pierre Lescure.

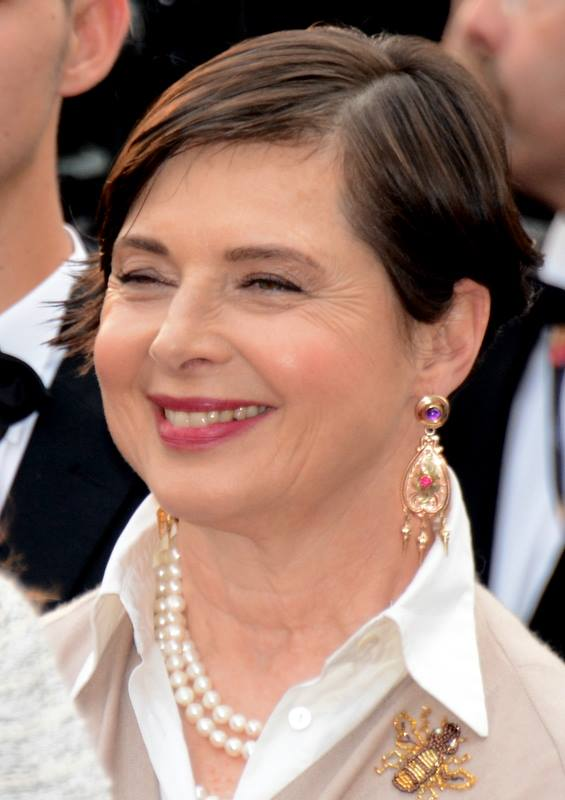
Isabella Rossellini, Un Certain Regard Jury President

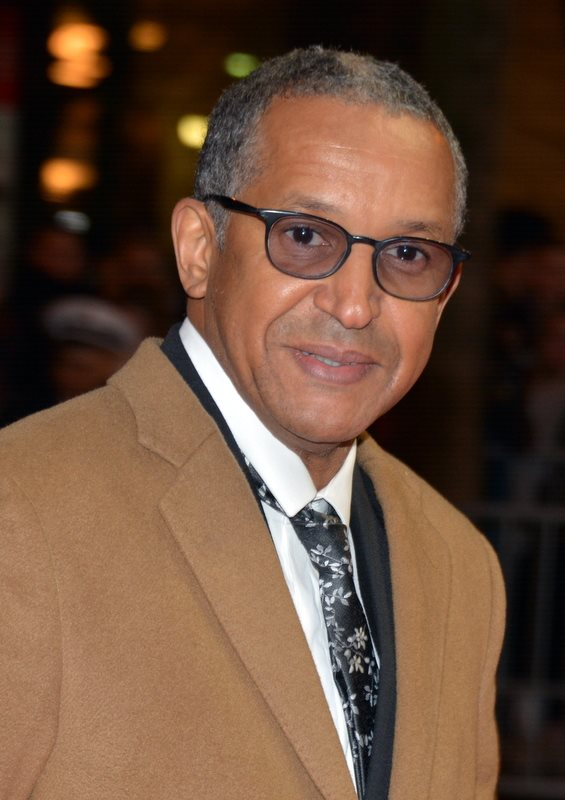
Abderrahmane Sissako, Cinéfondation and Short Films Competition Jury President

=== Main competition ===
- Ethan and Joel Coen, American filmmakers – Jury Co-Presidents
- Rossy de Palma, Spanish actress
- Guillermo del Toro, Mexican filmmaker
- Xavier Dolan, Canadian filmmaker and actor
- Jake Gyllenhaal, American actor
- Sophie Marceau, French actress and filmmaker
- Sienna Miller, English actress
- Rokia Traoré, Malian singer-songwriter and composer

=== Un Certain Regard ===
- Isabella Rossellini, Italian-American actress – Jury President
- Haifaa al-Mansour, Saudi Arabian filmmaker
- Panos H. Koutras, Greek filmmaker
- Nadine Labaki, Lebanese filmmaker and actress
- Tahar Rahim, French actor

=== Camera d'Or ===
- Sabine Azéma, French actress – Jury President
- Claude Garnier, French cinematographer
- Delphine Gleize, French filmmaker
- Yann Gonzalez, French filmmaker
- Didier Huck, French Technicolor executive
- Bernard Payen, French film critic and curator
- Melvil Poupaud, French actor

=== Cinéfondation and Short Films Competition ===
- Abderrahmane Sissako, Mauritanian filmmaker – Jury President
- Cécile de France, Belgian actress
- Joana Hadjithomas, Lebanese filmmaker
- Daniel Olbrychski, Polish actor
- Rebecca Zlotowski, French filmmaker

=== Critics' Week ===
- Ronit Elkabetz, Israeli actress and filmmaker – Jury President
- Andréa Picard, Canadian film curator and critic
- Katell Quillévéré, French filmmaker
- Peter Suschitzky, English cinematographer
- Boyd van Hoeij, French-based Dutch film critic

=== L'Œil d'or ===
- Rithy Panh, Franco-Cambodian filmmaker – Jury President
- Diana El Jeiroudi, Syrian producer
- Scott Foundas, American film critic
- Irène Jacob, Franco-Swiss actress
- Nicolas Philibert, French filmmaker

=== Queer Palm ===
- Desiree Akhavan, American-Iranian filmmaker and actress – Jury President
- Ava Cahen, French journalist
- Laëtitia Eïdo, French actress
- Elli Mastorou, Belgian film journalist
- Nadia Turincev, French film producer

== Official selection ==
=== In Competition ===
The films competing for the Palme d'Or were announced at a press conference on 16 April 2015. Two films were added to the main competition line-up on 23 April 2015, Valley of Love by Guillaume Nicloux and Chronic by Michel Franco. The following films were selected to compete for the Palme d'Or:

English Title	Original Title	Director(s)	Production Country
The Assassin	聶隱娘	Hou Hsiao-hsien	Taiwan, China, Hong Kong
Carol (QP)		Todd Haynes	United Kingdom, United States
Chronic		Michel Franco	Mexico, France
Dheepan		Jacques Audiard	France
The Lobster		Yorgos Lanthimos	Greece, France, Ireland, Netherlands, United Kingdom
Louder Than Bombs		Joachim Trier	Norway, France, Denmark
Macbeth		Justin Kurzel	United Kingdom, France
Marguerite & Julien (QP)	Marguerite et Julien	Valérie Donzelli	France
The Measure of a Man	La Loi du marché	Stéphane Brizé	France
Mia Madre		Nanni Moretti	Italy, France
Mountains May Depart	山河故人	Jia Zhangke	China, Japan, France
My King	Mon Roi	Maïwenn	France
Our Little Sister	海街 diary	Hirokazu Kore-eda	Japan
The Sea of Trees		Gus Van Sant	United States
Sicario		Denis Villeneuve	United States
Son of Saul (CdO)	Saul fia	László Nemes	Hungary
Tale of Tales	Il racconto dei racconti	Matteo Garrone	Italy, France, United Kingdom
Valley of Love	La Vallée de l'amour	Guillaume Nicloux	France
Youth	La giovinezza	Paolo Sorrentino	Italy, France, Switzerland, United Kingdom

(CdO) indicates film eligible for the Caméra d'Or as directorial debut feature.
(QP) film eligible for the Queer Palm.

=== Un Certain Regard ===
The following films were selected to compete in the Un Certain Regard section: Sweet Red Bean Paste by Naomi Kawase was the opening film.

English Title	Original Title	Director(s)	Production Country
Alias Maria		José Luis Rugeles Gracia	Colombia, Argentina, France
Cemetery of Splendour	รักที่ขอนแก่น	Apichatpong Weerasethakul	Thailand
The Chosen Ones	Las elegidas	David Pablos	Mexico
Disorder	Maryland	Alice Winocour	France
Fly Away Solo (CdO)	Masaan	Neeraj Ghaywan	India
The Fourth Direction	Chauthi Koot	Gurvinder Singh	India
The High Sun	Zvizdan	Dalibor Matanić	Croatia, Slovenia
I Am a Soldier (CdO)	Je suis un soldat	Laurent Larivière	France, Belgium
Journey to the Shore	岸辺の旅	Kiyoshi Kurosawa	Japan
Lamb (CdO)		Yared Zeleke	Ethiopia, France, Germany, Norway
Madonna	마돈나	Shin Su-won	South Korea
Nahid (CdO)	ناهید	Ida Panahandeh	Iran
One Floor Below	Un etaj mai jos	Radu Muntean	Romania
The Other Side (ŒdO)		Roberto Minervini	United States, Italy
Rams	Hrútar	Grímur Hákonarson	Iceland
The Shameless	무뢰한	Oh Seung-uk	South Korea
Sweet Bean (opening film)	あん	Naomi Kawase	Japan
Trap	Taklub	Brillante Mendoza	Philippines
The Treasure	Comoara	Corneliu Porumboiu	Romania

(CdO) film eligible for the Caméra d'Or as directorial debut feature.
(ŒdO) film eligible for the Œil d'or as documentary.

=== Out of Competition ===
The following films were selected to screen out of competition:

English Title	Original Title	Director(s)	Production Country
Ice and the Sky (closing film) (ŒdO)	La Glace et le ciel	Luc Jacquet	France
Inside Out		Pete Docter	United States
Irrational Man		Woody Allen	United States
The Little Prince	Le Petit Prince	Mark Osborne	France
Mad Max: Fury Road		George Miller	Australia, United States
Standing Tall (opening film)	La Tête haute	Emmanuelle Bercot	France
Midnight Screenings
Amy (ŒdO) (QP)		Asif Kapadia	United Kingdom
Love (QP)		Gaspar Noé	France
Office (CdO)	오피스	Hong Won-chan	South Korea

(CdO) indicates film eligible for the Caméra d'Or as directorial debut feature.
(ŒdO) film eligible for the Œil d'or as documentary.
(QP) film eligible for the Queer Palm.

=== Special Screenings ===
English Title	Original Title	Director(s)	Production Country
Afterthought (CdO)	היורד למעלה	Elad Keidan	Israel
Amnesia		Barbet Schroeder	Switzerland, France
Don't Tell Me the Boy Was Mad	Une histoire de fou	Robert Guédiguian	France
Macadam Stories	Asphalte	Samuel Benchetrit	France
Our House (ŒdO)	Oka	Souleymane Cissé	Mali
Panama (CdO)		Pavle Vučković	Serbia
A Tale of Love and Darkness (CdO)	סיפור על אהבה וחושך	Natalie Portman	United States, Israel

(CdO) indicates film eligible for the Caméra d'Or as directorial debut feature.
(ŒdO) film eligible for the Œil d'or as documentary.

=== Cinéfondation ===
The Cinéfondation section focuses on films made by students at film schools. The following 18 entries (14 fiction films and 4 animation films) were selected out of 1,600 submissions. More than one-third of the films selected represent schools participating in Cinéfondation for the first time. It is also the first time that a film representing a Spanish film school had been selected.

English Title	Original Title	Director(s)	School
14 Steps	Четырнадцать шагов	Maksim Shavkin	Moscow School of New Cinema, Russia
Absent	Abwesend	Eliza Petkova	dffb, Germany
Amphibian	Anfibio	Héctor Silva Núñez	EICTV, Cuba
Leonardo		Félix Hazeaux, Thomas Nitsche, Edward Noonan, Franck Pina and Raphaëlle Plantier	MOPA (formerly Supinfocom-Arles), France
Lost Queens	Locas perdidas	Ignacio Juricic Merillán	Carrera de Cine y TV Universidad de Chile, Chile
The Magnetic Nature	El ser mágnetico	Mateo Bendesky	Universidad del Cine, Argentina
Manoman		Simon Cartwright	National Film and Television School, United Kingdom
Paradise	Het Paradijs	Laura Vandewynckel	RITS School of Arts Brussels, Belgium
Retriever		Tomáš Klein and Tomáš Merta	FAMU Prague, Czech Republic
The Return of Erkin	возвращение Эркин	Maria Guskova	High Courses for Scriptwriters & Film Directors, Russia
Share		Pippa Bianco	AFI Directing Workshop for Women, United States
Slaughterhouse	کشتارگاه	Behzad Azadi	Art University of Tehran, Iran
Ten Buildings Away	עשרה רחובות, מאה עצים	Miki Polonski	Minshar for Art, Israel
To Return Until	Ainahan ne palaa	Salla Sorri	Aalto University-ELO Film School Helsinki Finland
Tsunami		Sofie Kampmark	The Animation Workshop, Denmark
Under the Sun	日光之下	Qiu Yang	The VCA, Film & TV School, Melbourne University, Australia
Victor XX		Ian Garrido López	ESCAC, Spain
The Wheel of Emotions	Les Chercheurs	Aurélien Peilloux	La Fémis, France

=== Short Films Competition ===
Out of 4,550 entries, the following films were selected to compete for the Short Film Palme d'Or:

English Title	Original Title	Director(s)	Production Country
Ave Maria	السلام عليك يا مريم	Basil Khalil	Palestine, France, Germany
Buddy	Copain	Jan Roosens and Raf Roosens	Belgium
The Guests		Shane Danielsen	Australia
Love Is Blind		Dan Hodgson	United Kingdom
Patriot		Eva Riley	United Kingdom
Present Imperfect	Presente imperfecto	Iair Said	Argentina
P.S. I Can't Breathe		Monet Merchand and Rochelle White	United States
Sunday Lunch	Le Repas dominical	Céline Devaux	France
Tuesday	Salı	Ziya Demirel	Turkey, France
Waves '98	موج ٩٨	Ely Dagher	Lebanon, Qatar

=== Cannes Classics ===
The full line-up for the Cannes Classics section was announced on 30 April 2015. Greek-French film director Costa-Gavras was announced as the guest of honor. In tribute to the recently deceased Portuguese film director, Cannes Classics screened Manoel de Oliveira's posthumous 1982 film Memories and Confessions. The film was previously unseen outside of Portugal.

English Title	Original Title	Director(s)	Production Country
Restored Prints
Battles Without Honor and Humanity (1973)	仁義なき戦い	Kinji Fukasaku	Japan
Black Girl (1966)	La Noire de...	Ousmane Sembène	France, Senegal
Elevator to the Gallows (1958)	Ascenseur pour l'échafaud	Louis Malle	France
Insiang (1976)		Lino Brocka	Philippines
Marius (1931)		Alexander Korda	France
La Marseillaise (1938)		Jean Renoir	France
The Official Story (1985)	La historia oficial	Luis Puenzo	Argentina
Orders (1974)	Les Ordres	Michel Brault	Canada
Panic (1946)	Panique	Julien Duvivier	France
Ran (1985)	乱	Akira Kurosawa	Japan
Rocco and His Brothers (1960)	Rocco e i suoi fratelli	Luchino Visconti	Italy, France
The Round-Up (1966)	Szegénylegények	Miklós Jancsó	Hungary
The Story of the Last Chrysanthemums (1939)	残菊物語	Kenji Mizoguchi	Japan
Sur (1988)		Fernando Solanas	Argentina, France
The Third Man (1949)		Carol Reed	United Kingdom
A Touch of Zen (1971)	俠女	King Hu	Taiwan
Welcome, or No Trespassing (1964)	Добро пожаловать, или Посторонним вход воспрещён	Elem Klimov	Soviet Union
Les yeux brûlés (1986)		Laurent Roth	France
Tributes
Citizen Kane (1941)		Orson Welles	United States
The Lady from Shanghai (1947)		Orson Welles	United States
Lumière!		Louis Lumière	France
More (1969)		Barbet Schroeder	West Germany, France, Luxembourg
Visit or Memories and Confessions	Visita ou Memórias e Confissões	Manoel de Oliveira	Portugal
Z (1969)		Costa-Gavras	France, Algeria
Documentaries about Cinema
By Sidney Lumet (ŒdO)		Nancy Buirski	United States
Gérard Depardieu: Larger Than Life (CdO) (ŒdO)	Depardieu grandeur nature	Richard Melloul	France
Harold and Lillian: A Hollywood Love Story (ŒdO)		Daniel Raim	United States
Hitchcock/Truffaut (ŒdO)		Kent Jones	United States
Ingrid Bergman: In Her Own Words (ŒdO)	Jag är Ingrid	Stig Björkman	Sweden
Orson Welles: Shadows & Light (ŒdO)	Orson Welles, autopsie d'une légende	Elisabeth Kapnist	France
Sembene! (CdO) (ŒdO)		Samba Gadjigo and Jason Silverman	United States, Senegal
Steve McQueen: The Man & Le Mans (ŒdO)		Gabriel Clarke and John McKenna	United States, United Kingdom
This Is Orson Welles (ŒdO)		Clara Kuperberg and Julia Kuperberg	France
Anniversary of the Sixty Years of the Creation of the Palme d'Or
The Golden Palm's Legend (CdO) (ŒdO)	La Légende de la Palme d'Or	Alexis Veller	France

(CdO) indicates film eligible for the Caméra d'Or as directorial debut feature.
(ŒdO) film eligible for the Œil d'or as documentary.

=== Cinéma de la Plage ===
The Cinéma de la Plage is a part of the Official Selection of the festival. The outdoors screenings at the beach cinema of Cannes are open to the public:

English Title	Original Title	Director(s)	Production Country
Apollo 13 (1995)		Ron Howard	United States
Hibernatus (1969)		Edouard Molinaro	France, Italy
Hôtel du Nord (1938)		Marcel Carné	France
Ivan the Terrible (1944)	Иван Грозный	Sergei Eisenstein	Soviet Union
Joe Hill (1971)		Bo Widerberg	Sweden, United States
Rabid Dogs (2015)	Enragés	Eric Hannezo	France, Canada
Ran (1985)		Akira Kurosawa	Japan
The Tall Blond Man with One Black Shoe (1972)	Le grand blond avec une chaussure noire	Yves Robert	France
The Terminator (1984)		James Cameron	United States
The Usual Suspects (1995)		Bryan Singer	United States

== Parallel sections ==
=== Critics' Week ===
The full selection for the Critics' Week section was announced on 20 April 2015, at the section's website. Les Anarchistes by Elie Wajeman, and Learn by Heart by Mathieu Vadepied, were selected as the opening and closing films for the Critics' Week section.

English Title	Original Title	Director(s)	Production Country
In Competition
Dégradé (CdO)		Tarzan and Arab Nasser	France, Qatar
Krisha (CdO)		Trey Edward Shults	United States
Land and Shade (CdO)	La tierra y la sombra	César Augusto Acevedo	Colombia, France, Netherlands, Chile, Brazil
Mediterranea (CdO)		Jonas Carpignano	Italy, France, United States, Germany
Paulina	La patota	Santiago Mitre	Argentina, Brazil, France
Sleeping Giant (CdO)		Andrew Cividino	Canada
The Wakhan Front (CdO) (QP)	Ni le ciel ni la terre	Clément Cogitore	France, Belgium
Special Screenings
The Anarchists (opening film)	Les Anarchistes	Elie Wajeman	France
Coin Locker Girl (CdO)	차이나타운	Han Jun-hee	South Korea
Learn by Heart (CdO) (closing film)	La Vie en grand	Mathieu Vadepied	France
Two Friends (CdO) (QP)	Les Deux Amis	Louis Garrel	France
Shorts Films Competition
Boys	Pojkarna	Isabella Carbonell	Sweden
Chickenpox	Varicella	Fulvio Risuleo	Italy
Command Action		João Paulo Miranda Maria	Brazil
The Dragon's Demise	La Fin de dragon	Marina Diaby	France
Everything Will Be Okay	Alles wird gut	Patrick Vollrath	Germany
The Fox Exploits the Tiger's Might		Lucky Kuswandi	Indonesia
Love Comes Later		Sonejuhi Sinha	United States
Monsters Turn Into Lovers	Jeunesse des Loups-Garous	Yann Delattre	France
Ramona		Andrei Crețulescu	Romania
Too Cool for School		Kevin Phillips	United States

(CdO) indicates film eligible for the Caméra d'Or as directorial debut feature.
(QP) film eligible for the Queer Palm.

=== Directors' Fortnight ===
The full selection for the Directors' Fortnight section was announced on 21 April 2015, at the section's website. In the Shadow of Women by Philippe Garrel, and Dope by Rick Famuyiwa were selected as the opening and closing films for the section. Actua 1, a previously unseen 1968 short film directed by Garrel, preceded the screening of In the Shadow of Women.

English Title	Original Title	Director(s)	Production Country
Arabian Nights	As Mil e uma Noites	Miguel Gomes	Portugal
Beyond My Grandfather Allende (CdO) (ŒdO)	Allende, mi abuelo Allende	Marcia Tambutti Allende	Chile, Mexico
The Brand New Testament	Le Tout Nouveau Testament	Jaco Van Dormael	Luxembourg, France, Belgium
Cowboys (CdO)	Les Cowboys	Thomas Bidegain	France
Dope (QP) (closing film)		Rick Famuyiwa	United States
Embrace of the Serpent	El abrazo de la serpiente	Ciro Guerra	Colombia, Venezuela, Argentina
Fatima		Phillipe Faucon	France
Green Room		Jeremy Saulnier	United States
The Here After (CdO)	Efterskalv	Magnus von Horn	France, Poland, Sweden
In the Shadow of Women (opening film)	L'Ombre des femmes	Philippe Garrel	France
Much Loved (QP)		Nabil Ayouch	Morocco, France
Mustang (CdO) (QP)		Deniz Gamze Ergüven	France
My Golden Days	Trois souvenirs de ma jeunesse	Arnaud Desplechin	France
Peace to Us in Our Dreams		Šarūnas Bartas	Lithuania, France, Russia
A Perfect Day		Fernando León de Aranoa	Spain
Songs My Brothers Taught Me (CdO)		Chloé Zhao	United States
Short Films
Backyard	Quintal	André Novais Oliveira	Brazil
Blue Thunder	Bleu tonnerre	Jean-Marc E. Roy & Philippe David Gagné	Canada
The Broken Past	El pasado roto	Martín Morgenfeld & Sebastián Schjaer	Argentina
Calme ta joie		Emmanuel Laskar	France
The Exquisite Corpus		Peter Tscherkassky	Austria
A Few Seconds	Quelques secondes	Nora El Hourch	France
Kung Fury		David Sandberg	Sweden
Pitchoune		Reda Kateb	France
Pueblo		Elena López Riera	Spain
Rate Me		Fyzal Boulifa	United Kingdom
Trials, Exorcisms	Provas, Exorcismos	Susana Nobre	Portugal
Special Screenings
Yakuza Apocalypse: The Great War of the Underworld	極道大戦争	Takashi Miike	Japan

(CdO) indicates film eligible for the Caméra d'Or as directorial debut feature.
(ŒdO) film eligible for the Œil d'or as documentary.
(QP) film eligible for the Queer Palm.

=== ACID ===
ACID, an association of French and foreign film directors, demonstrates its support for nine films each year, seeking to provide support from filmmakers to other filmmakers. The full ACID selection was announced on 21 April 2015, at the section's website.

English Title	Original Title	Director(s)	Production Country
(Be)Longing	Volta à Terra	João Pedro Plácido	Portugal, Switzerland, France
Cosmodrama		Philippe Fernandez	France
Gaz de France		Benoît Forgeard	France
The Grief of Others		Patrick Wang	United States
I Am the People	Je suis le peuple	Anna Roussillon	France
Pauline (QP)	Pauline s'arrache	Emilie Brisavoine	France
Raging Rose	Crache Coeur	Julia Kowalski	France, Poland
Vanity (QP)	La Vanité	Lionel Baier	Switzerland, France
Where There Is Shade (QP)	De l'ombre il y a	Nathan Nicholovitch	France

(QP) indicates film eligible for the Queer Palm.

== Official Awards ==
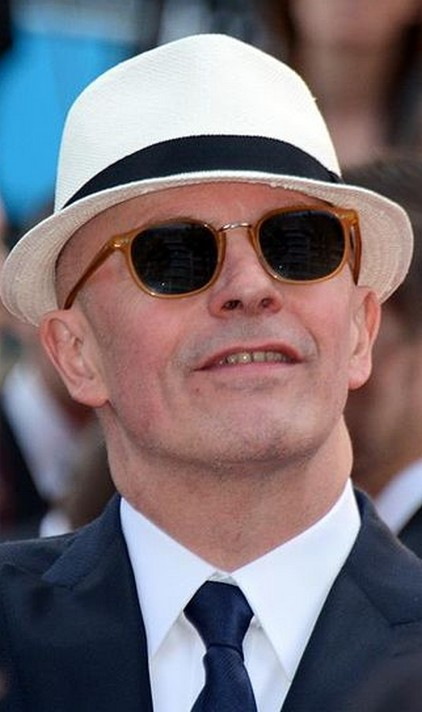
Jacques Audiard, winner of the Palme d'Or

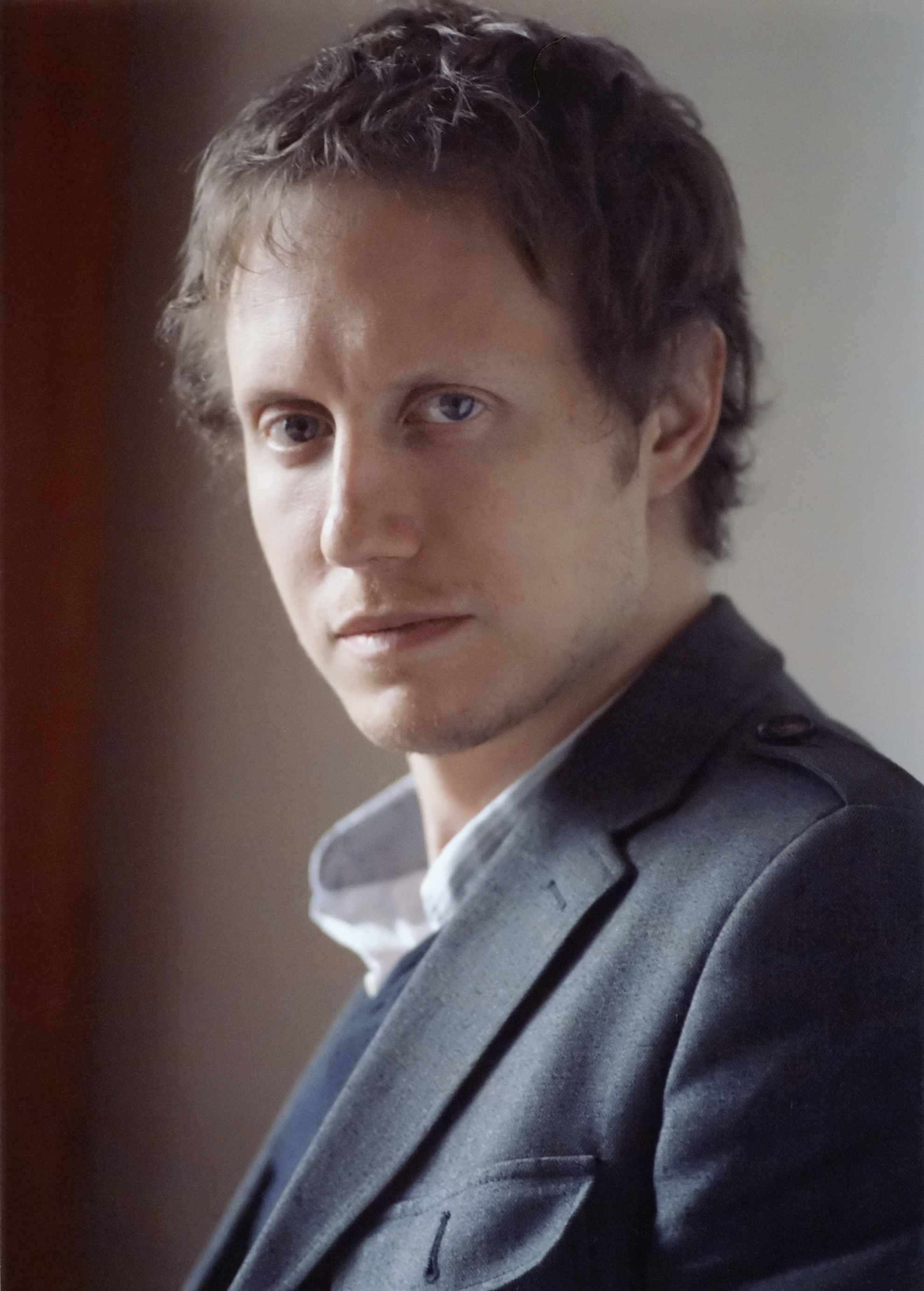
László Nemes, winner of the Gran Prix

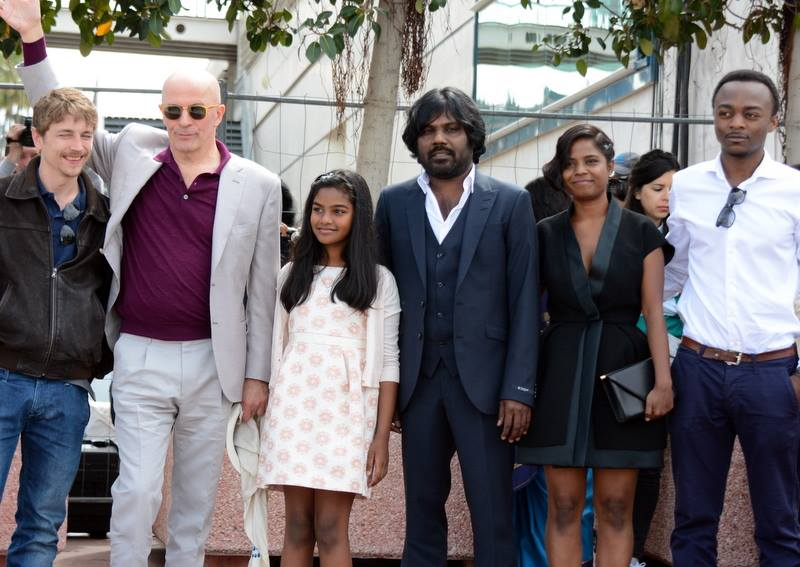
Director and stars of Palme d'Or winner Dheepan

=== In Competition ===
- Palme d'Or: Dheepan by Jacques Audiard
- Grand Prix: Son of Saul by László Nemes
- Best Director: Hou Hsiao-hsien for The Assassin
- Best Screenplay: Michel Franco for Chronic
- Best Actress:
  - Emmanuelle Bercot for Mon Roi
  - Rooney Mara for Carol
- Best Actor: Vincent Lindon for The Measure of a Man
- Jury Prize: The Lobster by Yorgos Lanthimos

=== Honorary Palme d'Or ===
- Agnès Varda

=== Un Certain Regard ===
- Prix Un Certain Regard: Rams by Grímur Hákonarson
- Un Certain Regard Jury Prize: The High Sun by Dalibor Matanić
- Un Certain Regard Award for Best Director: Kiyoshi Kurosawa for Journey to the Shore
- Prix Un Certain Talent: The Treasure by Corneliu Porumboiu
- Un Certain Regard Special Prize for Promising Future:
  - Nahid by Ida Panahandeh
  - Masaan by Neeraj Ghaywan

=== Caméra d'Or ===
- Land and Shade by César Augusto Acevedo

=== Cinéfondation ===
- First Prize: Share by Pippa Bianco
- Second Prize: Lost Queens by Ignacio Juricic Merillán
- Third Prize:
  - The Return of Erkin by Maria Guskova
  - Victor XX by Ian Garrido López

=== Short Films Competition ===
- Short Film Palme d'Or: Waves '98 by Ely Dagher
  - Special Mention: P.S. I Can't Breathe by Monet Merchand and Rochelle Leanne

== Independent Awards ==
=== FIPRESCI Prizes ===
- Son of Saul by László Nemes (In Competition)
- Masaan by Neeraj Ghaywan (Un Certain Regard)
- Paulina by Santiago Mitre (Critics' Week)

=== Vulcan Award of the Technical Artist ===
- Vulcan Award: Tamás Zányi (sound designer) for Son of Saul

=== Prize of the Ecumenical Jury ===
- Mia Madre by Nanni Moretti
- Commendations:
  - The Measure of a Man by Stéphane Brizé
  - Trap by Brillante Mendoza

=== Critics' Week ===
- Nespresso Grand Prize: Paulina by Santiago Mitre
- France 4 Visionary Award: Land and Shade by César Augusto Acevedo
- SACD Award: Land and Shade by César Augusto Acevedo
- Sony CineAlta Discovery Award for Short Film: Chickenpox by Fulvio Risuleo
- Canal+ Award: Ramona by Andrei Crețulescu
- Gan Foundation Support for Distribution Award: The Wakhan Front by Clément Cogitore

=== Directors' Fortnight ===
- Art Cinema Award: Embrace of the Serpent by Ciro Guerra
- SACD Prize: My Golden Days by Arnaud Desplechin
- Europa Cinemas Label Award: Mustang by Deniz Gamze Ergüven
- Illy Prize for Short Film: Rate Me by Fyzal Boulifa
  - Special Mention: The Exquisite Corpus by Peter Tscherkassky

=== L'Œil d'or ===
- Beyond My Grandfather Allende by Marcia Tambutti Allende
  - Special Mention: Ingrid Bergman: In Her Own Words by Stig Björkman

=== Queer Palm ===
- Carol by Todd Haynes
  - Special Mention: The Lobster by Yorgos Lanthimos
- Short Film Queer Palm: Lost Queens by Ignacio Juricic Merillán

=== Palm Dog ===
- Palm Dog Award: Lucky the Maltipoo for Arabian Nights
- Grand Jury Prize: "Bob" from The Lobster
- Palm Dog Manitarian award: I Am a Soldier

=== François Chalais Prize ===
- Son of Saul by László Nemes

=== Cannes Soundtrack Award ===
- Lim Giong for The Assassin
