= Valley of Love =

- Film poster
- Directed by: Guillaume Nicloux
- Written by: Guillaume Nicloux
- Produced by: Cyril Colbeau-Justin; Jean-Baptiste Dupont; Sylvie Pialat
- Starring: Isabelle Huppert; Gérard Depardieu
- Cinematography: Christophe Offenstein
- Edited by: Guy Lecorne
- Music by: Charles Ives
- Production companies: Les Films du Worso; LGM Productions
- Distributed by: Le Pacte
- Release dates: 22 May 2015 (Cannes); 17 June 2015 (France)
- Running time: 92 minutes
- Country: France
- Languages: French; English
- Budget: $2.9 million
- Box office: $1.2 million

Valley of Love is a 2015 French film directed by Guillaume Nicloux, starring Gérard Depardieu and Isabelle Huppert. It tells the story of two French people who used to be a couple and had a son 31 years ago. They reunite after the son's death, having received a letter asking them to visit five places in Death Valley, which will make the son reappear. The film was selected to compete for the Palme d'Or at the 2015 Cannes Film Festival. The film won the César Award for Best Cinematography at the 41st César Awards.

== Plot ==
Gérard and Isabelle, a French couple separated for decades, meet up at a desert motel in California. Each has received a letter from their son Michaël, who killed himself in San Francisco six months earlier, asking them to visit certain spots in Death Valley on certain days, when he will reappear to them. While Isabelle has stayed petite and attractive, she is shocked to see that Gérard is in poor health and enormous. The two squabble and sentimentalise, sometimes wondering if an old flame could be reignited and sometimes sick of the other's company. Grumbling at the apparent pointlessness of the mission, and wilting under the intense heat, they nevertheless follow Michaël's instructions. One night back at the motel, Isabelle panics and Gérard rushes to her room. She is convinced there was an intruder, who could have been Michaël. She says he seized her ankles, which afterwards exhibit a mysterious inflammation. Out together in the desert, Gérard walks on alone and returns to Isabelle in panic, convinced that he met Michaël, who seized his wrists. Later, they too become inflamed. The film ends there, leaving viewers to ponder what meaning the couple will draw from their experience and whether it may bring them closer again.

== Cast ==
- Isabelle Huppert as Isabelle
- Gérard Depardieu as Gérard

Huppert and Depardieu had last worked together on film more than 30 years earlier in 1980, approximately the same amount of time their characters in this movie had been separated.

== Production ==
The film was produced through Les Films du Worso and LGM Cinéma, with co-production support from DD Productions, France 3 Cinéma and Belgium's Scope Pictures. It was pre-bought by Canal+ and received backing from the CNC, Soficinéma, Cinémage, Cofinova and Palatine Etoile Soficas. Filming in California began on 8 September 2014.

== Release ==
The film was released in France on 17 June 2015.

In November 2015, the film was released by Strand Releasing in the United States.

== Accolades ==
Award	Category	Recipient(s)	Result
2015 Cannes Film Festival	Palme d'Or	Guillaume Nicloux	Nominated
41st César Awards	Best Actor	Gérard Depardieu	Nominated
41st César Awards	Best Actress	Isabelle Huppert	Nominated
41st César Awards	Best Cinematography	Christophe Offenstein	Won
21st Lumière Awards	Best Actor	Gérard Depardieu	Nominated
21st Lumière Awards	Best Actress	Isabelle Huppert	Nominated
