= Les Anarchistes =

- Film poster
- Directed by: Elie Wajeman
- Written by: Elie Wajeman; Gaëlle Macé
- Produced by: Lola Gans
- Starring: Tahar Rahim; Adèle Exarchopoulos; Swann Arlaud; Guillaume Gouix
- Cinematography: David Chizallet
- Edited by: François Quiqueré
- Music by: Gloria Jacobsen
- Production companies: France 2 Cinéma; 24 Mai Productions; Wild Bunch
- Distributed by: Mars Distribution
- Release dates: 14 May 2015 (Cannes); 11 November 2015 (France)
- Running time: 101 minutes
- Country: France
- Language: French
- Box office: $155,554

Les Anarchistes (English: The Anarchists) is a 2015 French drama film directed by Elie Wajeman and co-written with Gaëlle Macé. It was selected to open the Critics' Week section at the 2015 Cannes Film Festival.

== Plot ==
In 1899, brigadier Corporal Jean Albertini is recruited to infiltrate a group of anarchists.

== Cast ==
- Tahar Rahim as Corporal Jean Albertini
- Adèle Exarchopoulos as Judith Lorillard
- Swann Arlaud as Elisée
- Guillaume Gouix as Eugène Lévêque
- Cédric Kahn as Gaspar
- Sarah Le Picard as Marie-Louise Chevandier
- Karim Leklou as Biscuit
- Emilie de Preissac as Clothilde Lapiower
- Thilbault Lacroix as Albert Vuillard
- Arieh Worthalter as Adrian
- Simon Bellouard as Hans
- Aurélia Poirier as Martha

== Accolades ==
| Award / Film Festival | Category | Recipients and nominees | Result |
|---|---|---|---|
| César Awards | Most Promising Actor | Swann Arlaud | Nominated |
| Lumière Awards | Best Cinematography | David Chizallet | Won |
