= Mon Roi =

- Film poster
- Directed by: Maïwenn
- Written by: Étienne Comar; Maïwenn
- Produced by: Alain Attal
- Starring: Vincent Cassel; Emmanuelle Bercot; Louis Garrel; Isild Le Besco; Chrystèle Saint Louis Augustin
- Cinematography: Claire Mathon
- Edited by: Simon Jacquet
- Music by: Stephen Warbeck
- Production companies: Les Productions du Trésor; France 2 Cinéma; StudioCanal; Arches Films
- Distributed by: StudioCanal
- Release dates: 17 May 2015 (Cannes); 21 October 2015 (France)
- Running time: 128 minutes
- Country: France
- Language: French
- Budget: $10.6 million
- Box office: $8 million

Mon Roi, also known as My King, is a 2015 French drama film directed by Maïwenn. The film stars Vincent Cassel, Emmanuelle Bercot, Louis Garrel and Isild Le Besco (Maïwenn's sister). It was selected to compete for the Palme d'Or at the 2015 Cannes Film Festival. At Cannes, Bercot won the award for Best Actress.

== Plot ==
After Tony (Emmanuelle Bercot) has a skiing accident in which she injures her knee, she goes to a seaside clinic to recover. While there, her rehabilitation counsellor asks her to reflect on what led to her injury. Tony flashes back to her marriage with Georgio (Vincent Cassel).

One night, while out with her brother and his girlfriend at a club, Tony sees Georgio, a man she recognizes. She flicks water from a champagne bucket in his face but he claims not to recognize her. Leaving the club, Georgio invites Tony and her friends to his house. She reveals that they met while she was working her way through law school as a waitress and he used to flick water at women he would flirt with. Georgio is a restaurateur and Tony is impressed with his lifestyle and joie de vivre. On their second date, he takes her, without warning, to his friend's wedding, where he is serving as best man. They quickly begin dating, although she is agitated when he introduces her to Agnès, a former model girlfriend who dislikes Tony and tells her she "stole" her boyfriend. Nevertheless, things continue to progress between the couple. Georgio suddenly tells Tony that he wants her to have his baby; he has decided that he is "ready". Tony becomes pregnant and the two marry.

Agnès reacts to the news by attempting suicide. Georgio begins taking care of her and Tony feels he is more invested in Agnès than in their relationship. She leaves Georgio overnight, though he promises her he'll stop seeing Agnès. Georgio tells Tony that because she walked out on him, he will now never stop taking care of Agnès and also tells Tony that he can't live with her 24/7. It will be better for their relationship for them to live separately, being together mainly for the good times. He rents an apartment across the street from their shared apartment which he moves into. While she is living alone, a lawyer and movers come by to tell her that because Georgio is in severe debt, many of their possessions, including ones that she brought to the marriage, are being taken away to be sold. Georgio regains her possessions and the two briefly reconcile in time for their son, Sinbad, to be born. Their marriage begins to fracture again when Georgio goes to see Agnès again and later introduces her to their son. He also claims to be working at times Tony needs him to watch their son. However, when Tony goes to his apartment, she finds him in bed with a woman he claims not to know. He tells her that he has never cheated on her but admits to having a drug problem. Tony's brother tells her to leave Georgio but Tony argues that all marriages have their ups and downs and she is willing to continue trying.

Tony begins to take medication in order to cope with her depression over her marriage. She begins to increase her dosage until she finally attempts suicide by taking all her pills. After her suicide attempt, Tony finally decides to divorce Georgio, but he refuses, especially after she tells him that he will only be able to see his son every other weekend. He threatens her by saying that he'll bring up her suicide attempt and her depression during her pregnancy in order to keep custody of their son to himself. Nevertheless, the two have an amicable divorce and continue to sleep together from time to time. While attending therapy, Georgio apologizes to Tony for hurting her. The two take Sinbad on vacation together. Tony gets a high-publicity case defending a murderer and she realizes that Georgio is not happy for her despite explaining to him that the case will make her career. Busy with her case, Tony is surprised by Georgio at her office one day. He tells her he is afraid of losing her and that soon it will be their ten-year anniversary. He threatens her with physical violence. She tells him that he already lost her a long time ago, and that physical violence could not be worse than the emotional violence he has put her through.

Leaving rehab, Tony returns to normal life where she goes to a parent–teacher interview. Georgio makes an appearance, and though it is clear they still care about each other and share a mutual attraction, they do not interact, and they do not engage in a fight or any of the passive-aggressive behaviour that marked so much of their relationship. Georgio leaves early, saying goodbye to the teachers but not directly to Tony, who smiles wistfully before turning back to the interview.

== Cast ==
- Vincent Cassel as Georgio
- Emmanuelle Bercot as Tony
- Louis Garrel as Solal
- Isild Le Besco as Babeth
- Chrystèle Saint Louis Augustin as Agnès
- Patrick Raynal as Denis
- Paul Hamy as Pascal
- Yann Goven as Jean
- Djemel Barek as Djemel
- Marie Guillard as Marie
- Chrystèle Saint Louis Augustin as Georgio's ex-girlfriend
- Slim El Hedli as Slim
- Norman Thavaud as Nico

== Production ==
Maïwenn spent many years writing the script for the film, which was loosely based on her relationship with real estate developer Jean-Yves Le Fur. Agnès was based on model Karen Mulder, who was Le Fur's former fiancé and attempted suicide in 2002.

Maïwenn wrote the role of Tony specifically with Emmanuelle Bercot in mind. Her first choice for the role of Georgio was Vincent Cassel but upon their initial meeting he was so negative about the script and about Georgio's roles that Maïwenn initially thought he was passing on the role.

== Critical reception ==
Review aggregator site Rotten Tomatoes reports that 72% of critics have given the film a positive review, based on 74 reviews with an average rating of 6.7/10, the consensus being: "My King uses a medical catastrophe as the catalyst for a fully realized, thought-provoking look at love and co-dependency." On Metacritic, the film has received a score of 68 out of 100 based on 18 critics, indicating "generally favorable reviews".

Ignatiy Vishnevetsky of The A.V. Club said that despite "parts of the film that are intriguing on their own... [Mon Roi] is overlong and overheated, suggesting a filmmaker who's better at getting actors to yell at each other than at judging what's essential. [...] At its worst, it brings to mind the unedited first-draft manuscript of an inspirational memoir."

== Accolades ==
Award / Film Festival	Category	Recipients and nominees	Result
Cannes Film Festival	Palme d'Or	Maïwenn	Nominated
Cannes Film Festival	Best Actress	Emmanuelle Bercot (tied with Rooney Mara for Carol)	Won
César Awards	Best Film	Maïwenn (director), Alain Attal (producer)	Nominated
César Awards	Best Director	Maïwenn	Nominated
César Awards	Best Actor	Vincent Cassel	Nominated
César Awards	Best Actress	Emmanuelle Bercot	Nominated
César Awards	Best Supporting Actor	Louis Garrel	Nominated
César Awards	Best Editing	Simon Jacquet	Nominated
César Awards	Best Sound	Nicolas Provost, Agnès Ravez and Emmanuel Croset	Nominated
César Awards	Best Original Music	Stephen Warbeck	Nominated
Lumière Awards	Best Director	Maïwenn	Nominated
Lumière Awards	Best Actress	Emmanuelle Bercot	Nominated
Lumière Awards	Best Cinematography	Claire Mathon	Nominated
