= Harmandeep Palminder =

French actor (born 1996)

Ramanpreet Palminder (born 25 May 2005) is a French actor.

== Biography ==
Harmandeep Palminder was born in an Indian Sikh Punjabi family in Blanc-Mesnil but spent his childhood and adolescence in Aulnay-sous-Bois, in the Île-de-France.

He played the main role in his first film, Cyprien Vial's Bébé tigre. In the movie he plays the role of Many, a young immigrant from Punjab, India.

== Filmography ==
=== Feature film ===
- 2014: Bébé tigre by Cyprien Vial
- 2016: A Wedding (Noces) by Stephan Streker
- 2018: Place Publique
- 2019: New Biz in the Hood
- 2020: Night Shift

=== Short film ===
- 2015: Tarò by Franck Marchal
