= Amnesia (2015 film) =

- Cannes poster
- Directed by: Barbet Schroeder
- Written by: Emilie Bickerton; Peter F. Steinbach; Susan Hoffman; Barbet Schroeder
- Produced by: Ruth Waldburger; Margaret Menegoz
- Starring: Marthe Keller; Max Riemelt
- Cinematography: Luciano Tovoli
- Edited by: Nelly Quettier
- Music by: Lucien Nicolet
- Release dates: 19 May 2015 (Cannes); 19 August 2015 (France)
- Running time: 96 minutes
- Countries: Switzerland; France
- Languages: English; German; Catalan

Amnesia is a 2015 Swiss-French drama film directed by Barbet Schroeder. It was selected to screen in the Special Screenings section at the 2015 Cannes Film Festival.

Set in 1990 on the idyllic island of Ibiza, through a platonic love affair between a young man and a much older woman the film explores the reactions of three generations of Germans to the horrific crimes of Nazi Germany. Schroeder wrote that two of his aims for the film were "to make refusing the use of a language the main dramatic driver" and "to recount a love story advancing without sex, thanks to a series of unspoken agreements".

== Plot ==
Martha has lived by herself for decades in an isolated villa. Though German, she refuses to have anything to do with her native country: she will not speak or read the language and will not even ride in a VW Beetle, since that condones the evil of the regime that created the vehicle. At the only villa nearby arrives Jo, a young German who is a talented composer of electronic music and wants to make a career as a techno DJ. He is fascinated by Martha, even though she insists on speaking English, and the two solitary neighbours become close.

One day, friends from Germany visit Jo and afterwards Martha lets slip that she understood something said about her in German. Jo begs her to say what stops her using the language and she explains some of the traumas she underwent as a small child, seeing evidence of atrocities and losing her father in the camps. Jo only knows what he has learned at school and from his grandfather, since his mother always looked forwards to building a new Germany and never looked back.

Jo's grandfather and mother visit to tell him he should not be wasting his time in Mediterranean clubs but should return to a proper job in reunited Germany. Challenged by Martha, the grandfather confesses his role in atrocities. While Martha and Jo are deeply shocked, as is the old man after releasing long-suppressed memories. Jo's mother tells Martha that her avoidance of all things German is a selfish evasion and, wary of Jo's closeness to Martha, that the young man should come home.

After the air has been cleared by these exchanges, both Martha and Jo develop. He finds success as top DJ in the Amnesia club, while she starts enjoying German poetry and music. But when he declares his love for her, she says that going further together would never work.

Many years later, she is visited by Jo with his young wife and child.

== Cast ==
- Marthe Keller as Martha
- Max Riemelt as Jo
- Bruno Ganz as Jo's grandfather
- Corinna Kirchhoff as Jo's mother
- Fermí Reixach as Martha's Ibizan admirer
- Joel Basman as Rudolfo, Jo's friend
