= Xavier Giannoli =

French film director (born 1972)

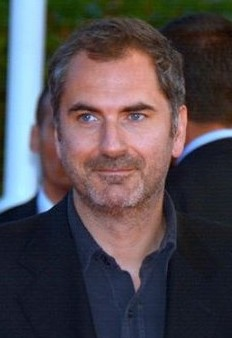
- Giannoli in 2013
- Born: 7 March 1972 (age 54)
- Occupations: Film director Screenwriter; Producer
- Years active: 1993–present

Xavier Giannoli (born 7 March 1972) is a French film director, screenwriter and producer. Most known for his films Marguerite (2015) and Lost Illusions (2021).

In 2010, he was named a Chevalier in the Ordre des Arts et des Lettres.

== Filmography ==
=== Feature film ===
Year	English Title	Original Title	Notes
2003	Eager Bodies	Les Corps impatients	Also cinematographer
2005	Une aventure		
2006	When I Was a Singer	Quand j'étais chanteur	
2009	In the Beginning	À l'origine	
2012	Superstar		
2015	Marguerite		
2018	The Apparition	L'Apparition	
2021	Lost Illusions	Illusions perdues	
2026	Rays and Shadows	Des Rayons et des Ombres	

=== Short film ===
Year	Title
1993	Le Condamné
1994	Terre sainte
1995	J'aime beaucoup ce que vous faites
1996	Dialogue au sommet
1998	L'Interview

=== Only producer ===
- Demonlover (2002)
- Clean (2004)
- Declaration of War (2012) - Associate producer

=== Television ===
Year	English Title	Original Title	Notes
2023	Of Money and Blood	D'argent et de sang	12 episodes co-directed with Frederic Planchon

== Awards and nominations ==
Year	Title	Notes
1996	Dialogue au sommet	Nominated—César Award for Best Short Film
1998	L'Interview	César Award for Best Short Film; Short Film Palme d'Or
2006	When I Was a Singer	Nominated—César Award for Best Film; Nominated—César Award for Best Original Screenplay; Nominated—Cannes Film Festival - Palme d'Or; Nominated—Globes de Cristal Award for Best Film
2009	In the Beginning	Nominated—César Award for Best Film; Nominated—César Award for Best Director; Nominated—César Award for Best Original Screenplay; Nominated—Lumière Award for Best Film; Nominated—Lumière Award for Best Director; Nominated—Cannes Film Festival - Palme d'Or
2012	Superstar	Nominated—Venice Film Festival - Golden Lion
2015	Marguerite	Venice Film Festival - P. Nazareno Taddei Award; Nominated—César Award for Best Film; Nominated—César Award for Best Director; Nominated—César Award for Best Original Screenplay; Nominated—Louis Delluc Prize for Best Film; Nominated—Lumière Award for Best Film; Nominated—Lumière Award for Best Director; Nominated—Lumière Award for Best Screenplay; Nominated—Venice Film Festival - Golden Lion
