= Emmanuel Bourdieu =

French writer, playwright, film director (born 1965)

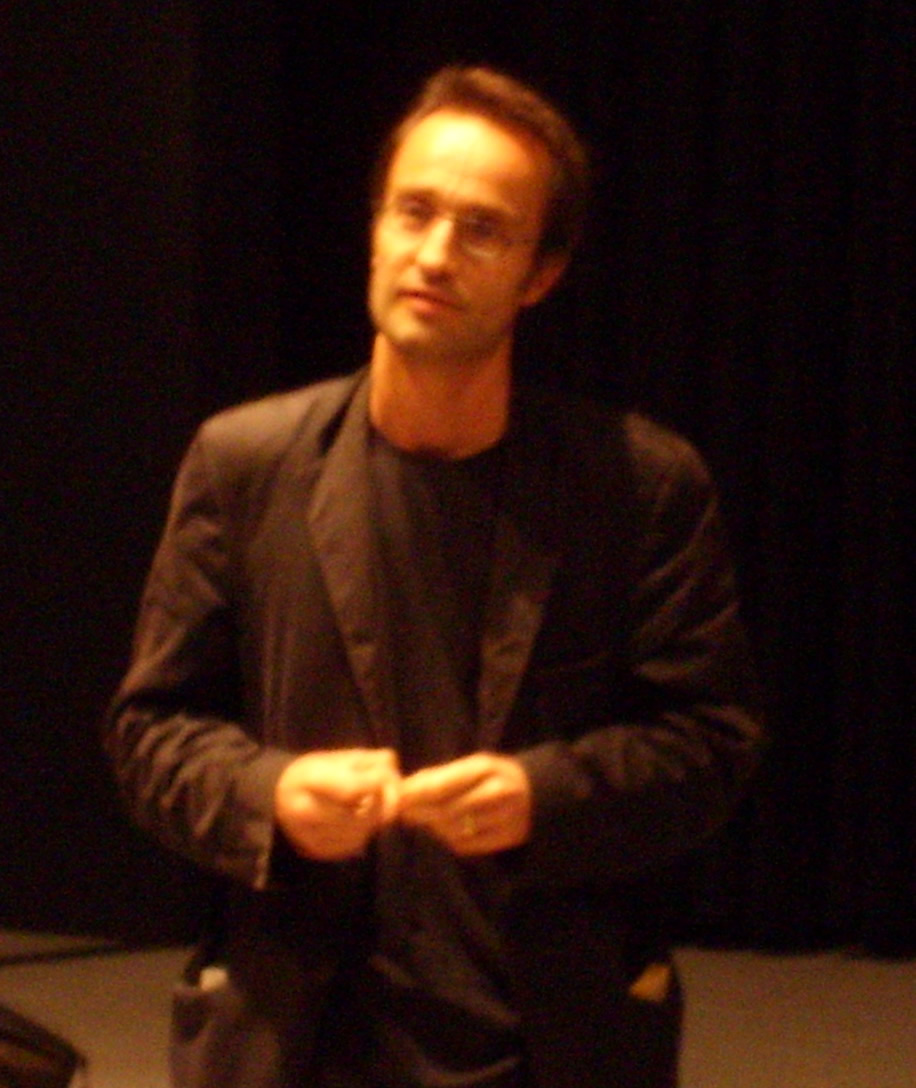
- Bourdieu in 2008
- Born: 6 April 1965 (age 61); Paris, France
- Education: École Normale Supérieure
- Occupations: Writer, philosopher
- Parent(s): Marie Claire Brizard; Pierre Bourdieu

Emmanuel Bourdieu (French pronunciation: [emanɥɛl buʁdjø]; born 6 April 1965 in Paris) is a French writer, playwright, film director and philosopher. He is the youngest son of Marie Claire Brizard and sociologist Pierre Bourdieu.

== Biography ==
While a student at Lycée Henri-IV, he met Denis Podalydès who belonged to the drama club of Lycée Fénelon.

An alumnus of the École Normale Supérieure (Ulm), he earned a PhD in philosophy. He taught philosophy courses at the University of Bordeaux III and assistant in linguistics at the University of Paris VII. He participated in the Cerisy conference on "American Philosophy."

During his studies, he met Jeanne Balibar and Arnaud Desplechin, with whom, together with Mathieu Amalric, Emmanuelle Devos, Denis and Bruno Podalydès, he created the group of young filmmakers and intellectuals called 'Rive Gauche'.

Emmanuel Bourdieu began his writing career in the theatre with the play Tout mon possible (All I Can) and Je crois (I Believe), put on in 1998 by Denis Podalydès. He then wrote for film with Arnaud Desplechin (My Sex Life... or How I Got into an Argument, Esther Kahn, A Christmas Tale), Nicole Garcia (Vendôme) and Catherine Corsini (The New Eve).

He started directing in 1998 with a short film called Venise (Venice), followed by Candidature (Candidacy) for which he won the Prix Jean Vigo (2001) and the César Award for Best Short Film (2003).

In his first feature film, released simultaneously in cinemas under the title Vert Paradis (Green Paradise) and broadcast on Arte as Les Cadets de Gascogne. It is based on the sociological work of his father in The Bachelors' Ball: The Crisis of Peasant Society in Béarn.

In 2006, Les Amitiés maléfiques (Poison Friends) received the Grand Prix of the Critics at Cannes Film Festival.

== Cinema ==
=== As actor ===
- 2004: Le Pont des Arts by Eugène Green, playing a spectator at the Noh performance

=== As director of photography ===
- 2001: Les Trois Théâtres (The Three Theatres) by Emmanuel Bourdieu

=== As short film director ===
- 1998: Venise (Venice)
- 2001: Les Trois Théâtres (The Three Theatres)
- 2001: Candidature (Candidacy)

=== As a feature film director ===
- 2003: Vert Paradis (Green Paradise)
- 2006: Les Amitiés maléfiques (Poison Friends)
- 2006: Mascarade (Masquerade)
- 2008: Intrusions
- 2013: Drumont, histoire d'un antisémite français (Drumont: The Story of a French Anti-Semite) – historical TV movie about Édouard Drumont
- 2016: Louis-Ferdinand Céline - adapted from Milton Hindus' 1950 book on French author Louis-Ferdinand Céline

=== As writer or co-writer ===
- 1996: My Sex Life... or How I Got into an Argument by Arnaud Desplechin
- 1998: Vendôme by Nicole Garcia
- 1998: The New Eve by Catherine Corsini
- 2000: Esther Kahn by Arnaud Desplechin
- 2000: Bronx-Barbes by Eliane de Latour
- 2001: Les Trois Théâtres
- 2001: Candidature
- 2003: Playing 'In the Company of Men' by Arnaud Desplechin
- 2003: Vert Paradis, scenario by Denis Podalydès and Marcia Romano
- 2006: Les Amitiés maléfiques
- 2008: A Christmas Tale by Arnaud Desplechin
- 2008: Intrusions

== Theatre ==
=== As writer and director of plays ===
- 1996: Parce qu'il est comme ça (Because It Is Like This)
- 1997: Les Grands Esprits se rencontrent (The Great Spirits Meet)
- 1998: Tout mon possible (All I Can)
- 2002: Je crois (I Believe), staging by Denis Podalydès
- 2007: Le Mental de l’équipe (The Mind of the Team) by Emmanuel Bourdieu and Frédéric Bélier-Garcia, staging by Denis Podalydès and Frédéric Bélier-Garcia, Théâtre du Rond-Point
- 2010: Le Cas Jekyll (The Jekyll Case) by Christine Montalbetti, directed by Emmanuel Bourdieu and Eric Ruf, Théâtre national de Chaillot
- 2013: L'Homme qui se hait (The Man Who Hates) by Emmanuel Bourdieu, directed by Denis Podalydès and Emmanuel Bourdieu, Théâtre national de Chaillot.

== Literature ==
- Mes parents (My Parents), 3-volume boxed set by Serge Lalou, Richard Bean and Emmanuel Bourdieu (8 April 2005)
- Je crois (I Believe) by Emmanuel Bourdieu (26 February 2002)
- Esther Kahn (Bilingual scenario) by Arnaud Desplechin and Emmanuel Bourdieu (Sep 2000)

== Awards ==
- 2001 Prix Jean Vigo to Candidature
- 2003: Candidature, nominated for the César Award for Best Short Film
- 2003: Vert Paradis: Prize of the international press at the Festival of Geneva 2003
- 2006: Les Amitiés maléfiques: Grand Prix of the International Critics' Week
