= Quentin Dolmaire =

French actor (born 1994)

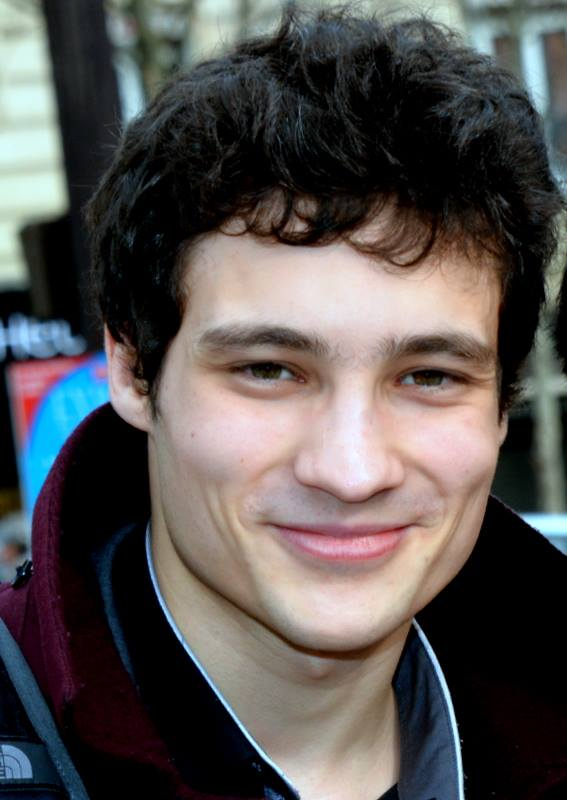
- Quentin Dolmaire at the banquet dinner for the 41st César Awards
- Born: February 18, 1994 (age 32)
- Occupation: Actor
- Years active: 2015–present
- Notable work: My Golden Days

Quentin Dolmaire (born 18 February 1994) is a French actor. He was nominated for the César Award for Most Promising Actor in 2016 for his role in My Golden Days.

== Biography ==
Dolmaire, having played theatre since the age of ten, quit his physics studies, in order to follow acting courses at Cours Simon. He was only in his second course when he was approached by the director Arnaud Desplechin for the role of Paul Dédalus in My Golden Days, the sequel to My Sex Life... or How I Got into an Argument. Dolmaire plays the adolescent version of the character in the movie, whilst Mathieu Amalric plays the elder.

== Filmography ==
Year	Title	Role	Director	Notes
2015	My Golden Days	Paul Dédalus	Arnaud Desplechin	Nominated - César Award for Most Promising Actor; Nominated - Lumière Award for Best Male Revelation
2016	Les heures de coton	Thomas	Sébastien Truchet	Short
2017	The Midwife	Simon	Martin Provost	
2017	Redoubtable	Paul	Michel Hazanavicius	
2017	Ex-voto	Lucas	Antoine Beauvois	Short
2017	L'amour volant	Gaspard	Antoine Denis	Short
2018	Ulysses & Mona	Camille	Sébastien Betbeder	
2018	Paris Pigalle	Vincent	Cédric Anger	
2018	Un violent désir de bonheur	Gabriel / François	Clément Schneider	
2018	L'autre sur ma tête	Nani	Julie Colly	Short
2018	Sur la terre, des orages	Nathan	Marion Jhöaner	Short
2018	Capitaine Marleau	Tom Tamani	Josée Dayan	TV series (1 episode)
2019	Synonyms	Emile	Nadav Lapid	
2021–2022	UFOs	Rémy Bidaut		TV series (24 episodes)
