= 11th Satellite Awards =

Awards ceremony for film and television

- Date: December 18, 2006

Highlights
- Best drama film: The Departed
- Best comedy/musical film: Dreamgirls
- Best television drama: House, M.D.
- Best television musical/comedy: Ugly Betty
- Best director: Bill Condon for Dreamgirls; Clint Eastwood for Flags of Our Fathers

The 11th Satellite Awards, honoring the best in film and television of 2006, were given on December 18, 2006.

== Special achievement awards ==
Auteur Award (for his visionary work as a filmmaker) – Robert Altman

Mary Pickford Award (for outstanding contribution to the entertainment industry) – Martin Landau

Nikola Tesla Award (for creating special effects on the 1978 film Superman that pre-dated contemporary computer-generated images) – Richard Donner

Outstanding Guest Star (Law & Order: Special Victims Unit) – Jerry Lewis

== Motion picture winners and nominees ==
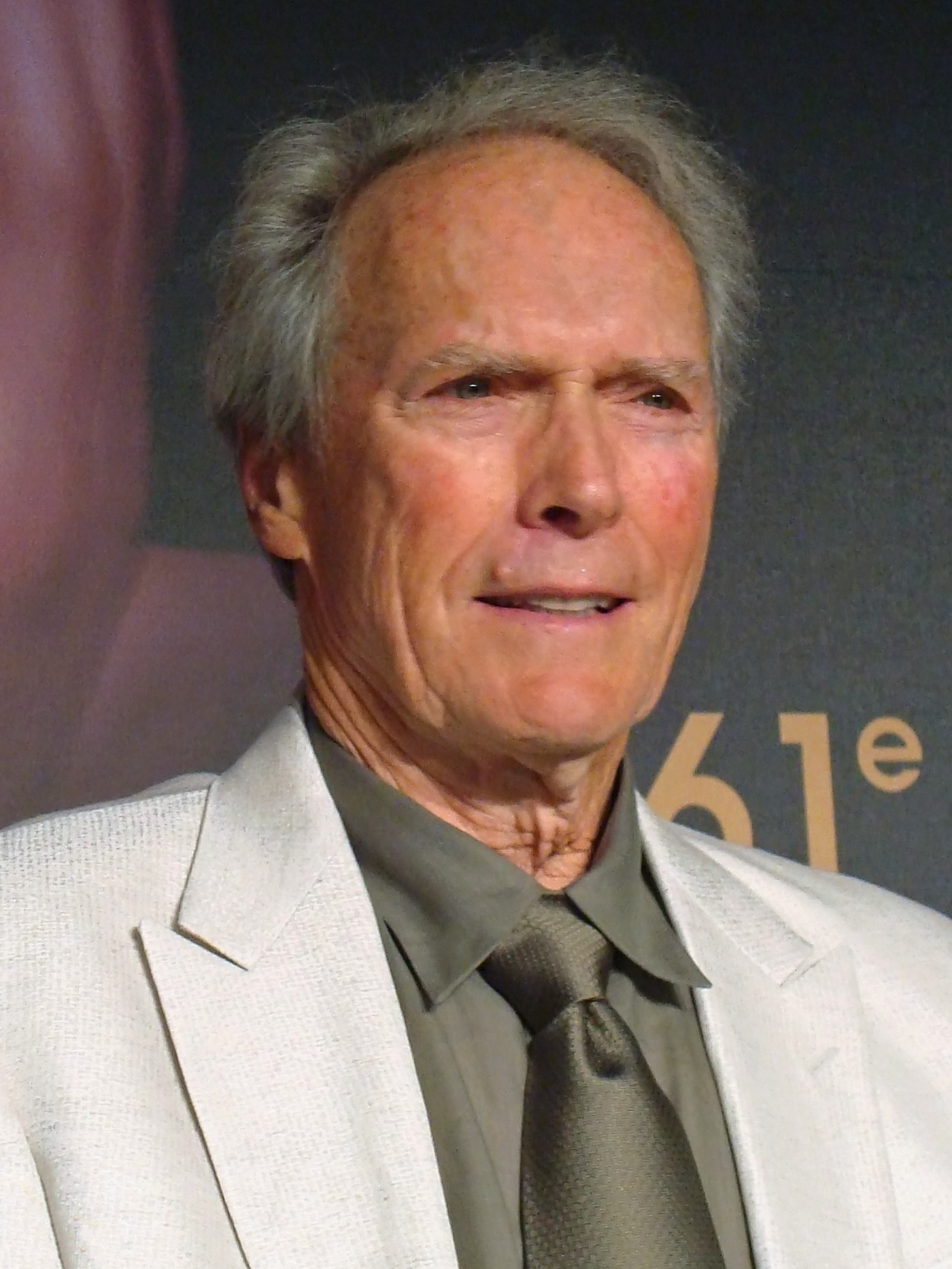
Clint Eastwood, Best Director co-winner

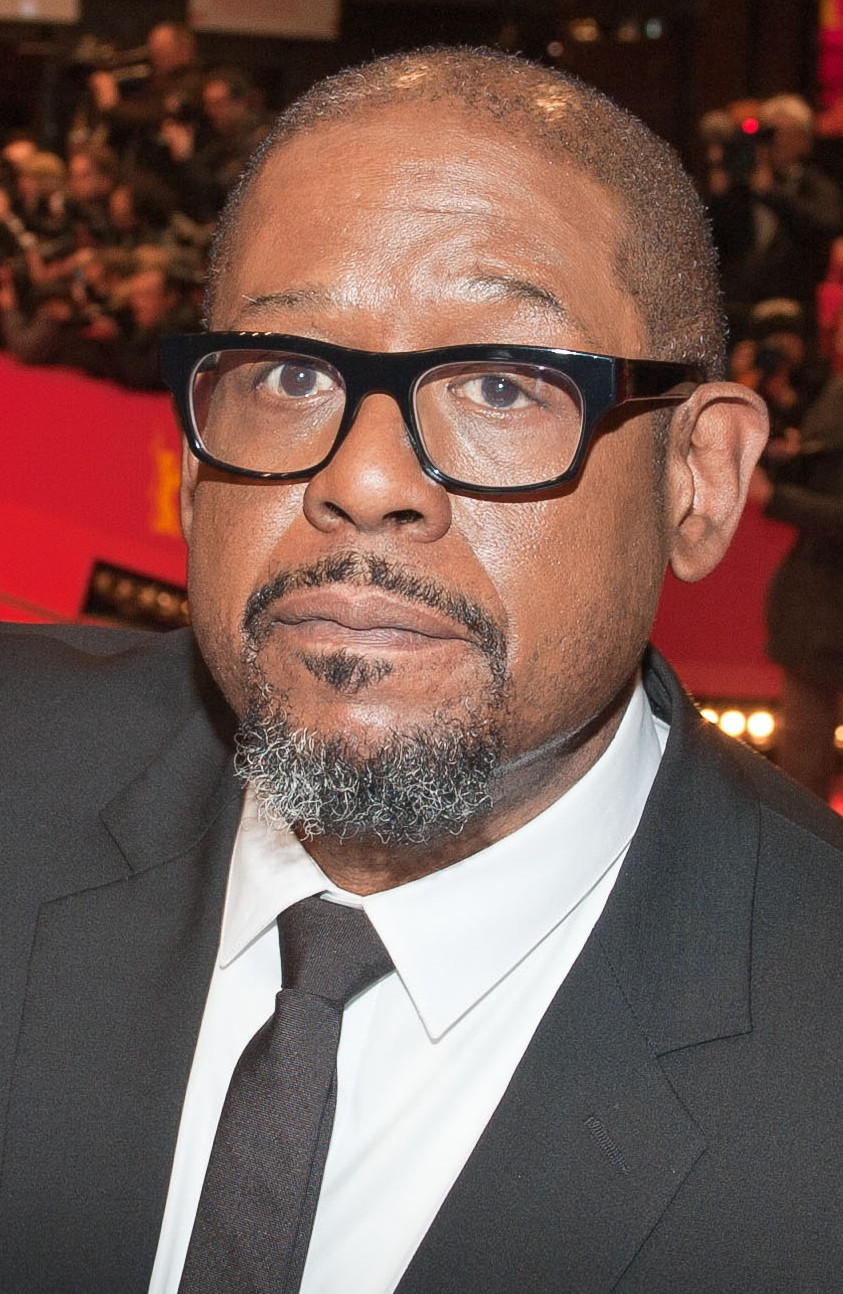
Forest Whiatker, Best Actor in a Motion Picture – Drama winner

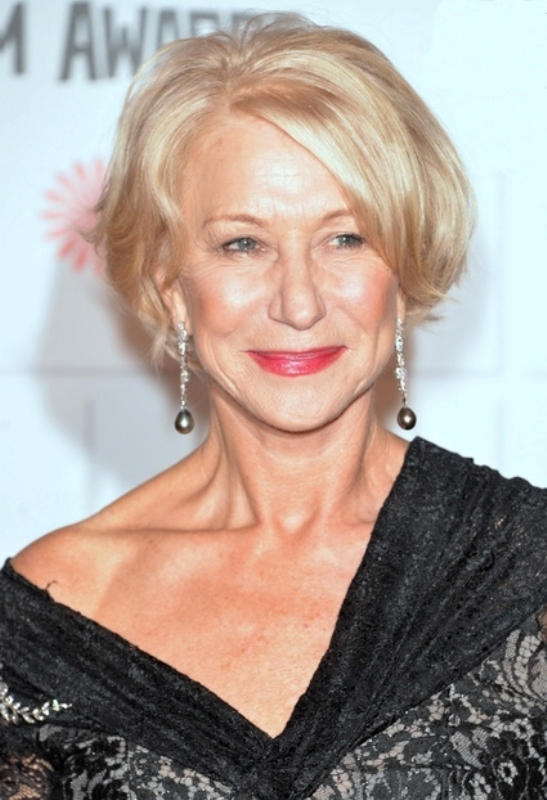
Helen Mirren, Best Actress in a Motion Picture – Drama winner

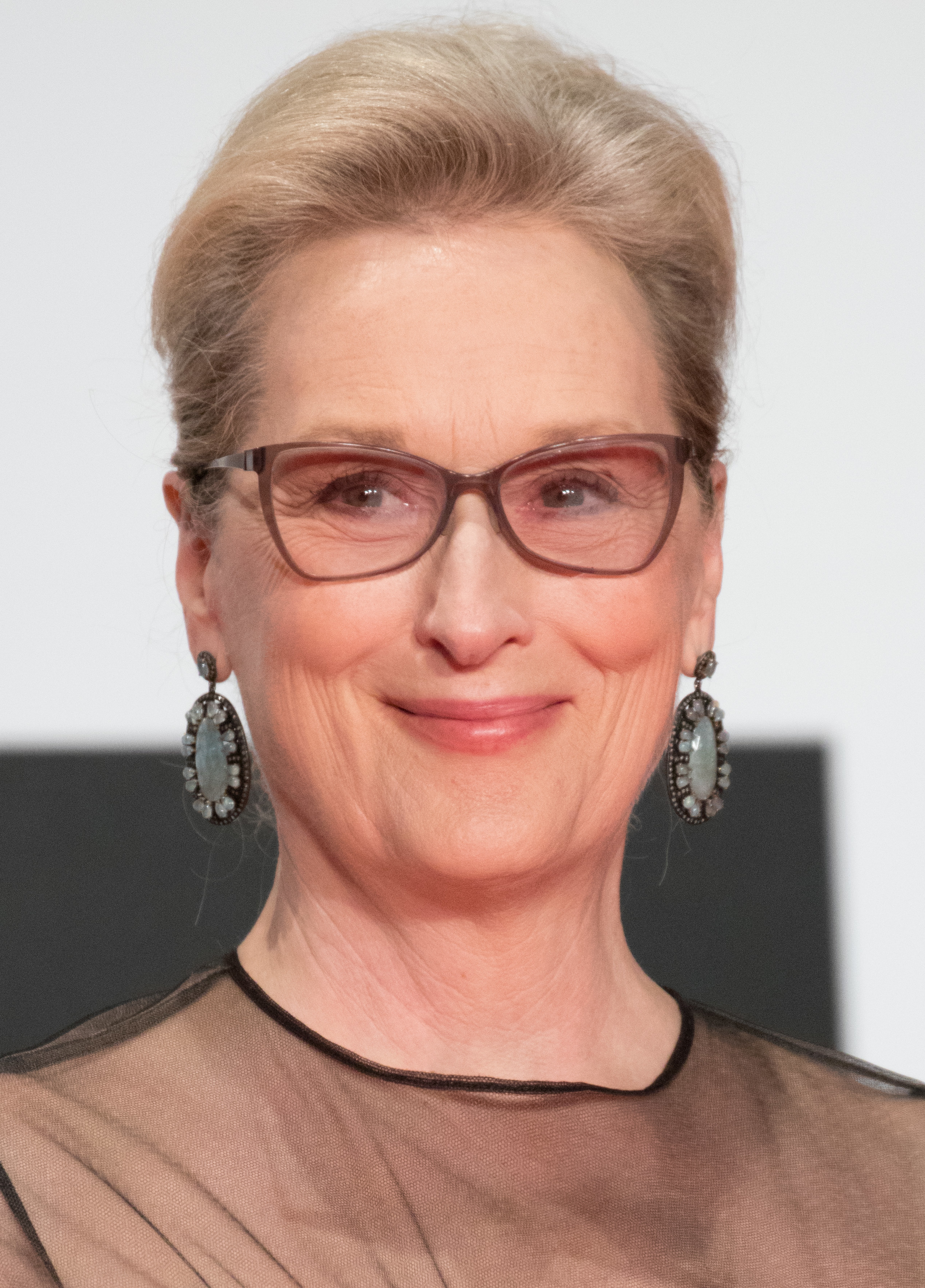
Meryl Streep, Best Actress in a Motion Picture – Comedy or Musical winner

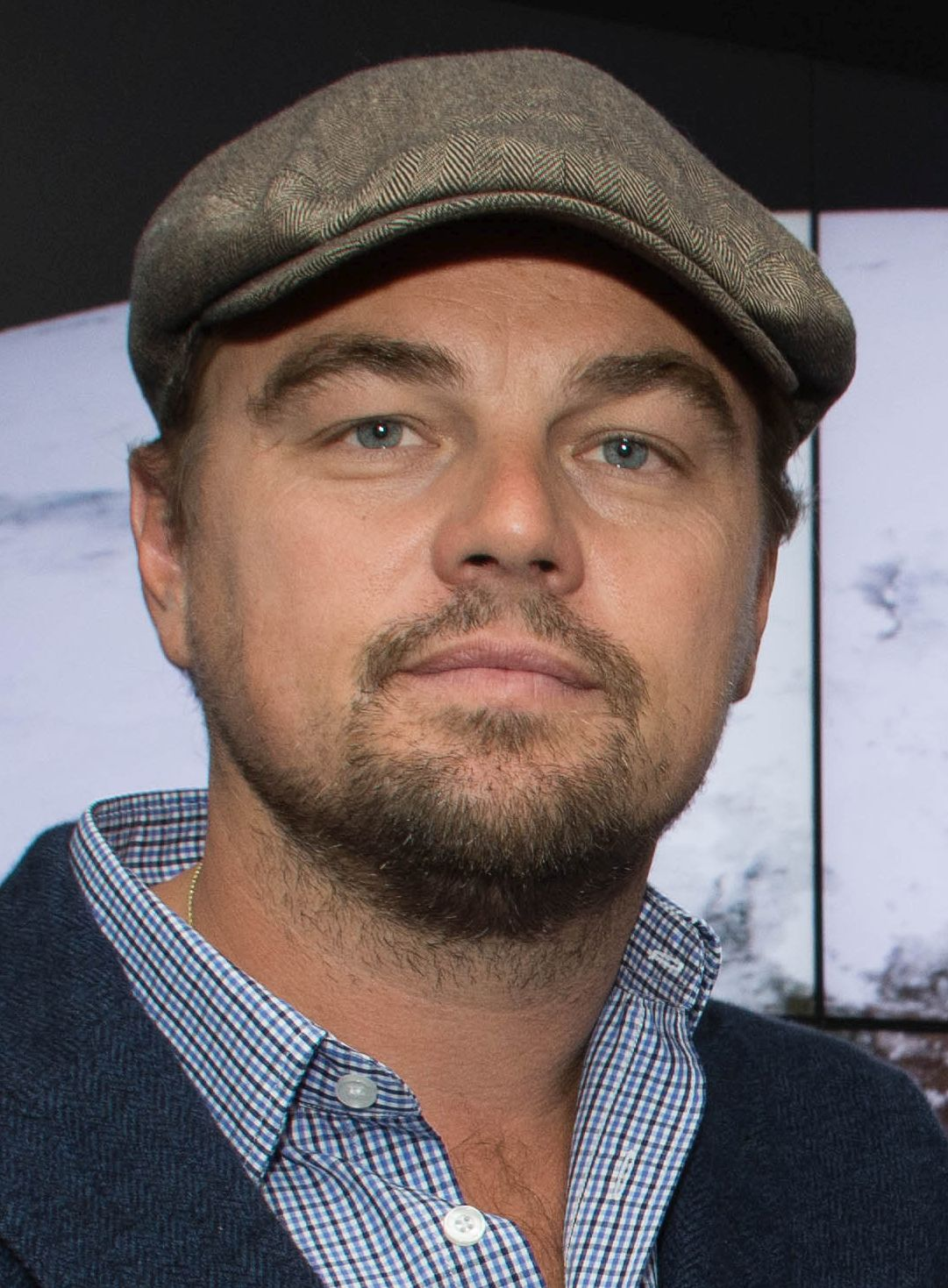
Leonardo DiCaprio, Best Supporting Actor in a Motion Picture winner

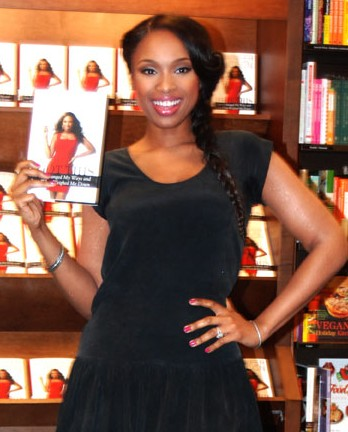
Jennifer Hudson, Best Supporting Actress in a Motion Picture winner

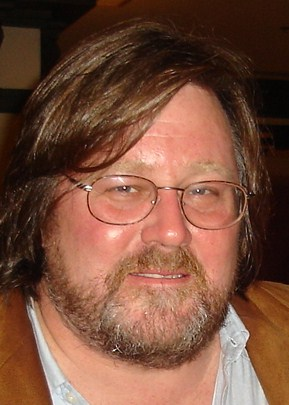
William Monahan, Best Adapted Screenplay winner

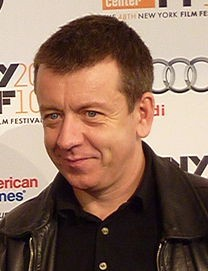
Peter Morgan, Best Original Screenplay winner

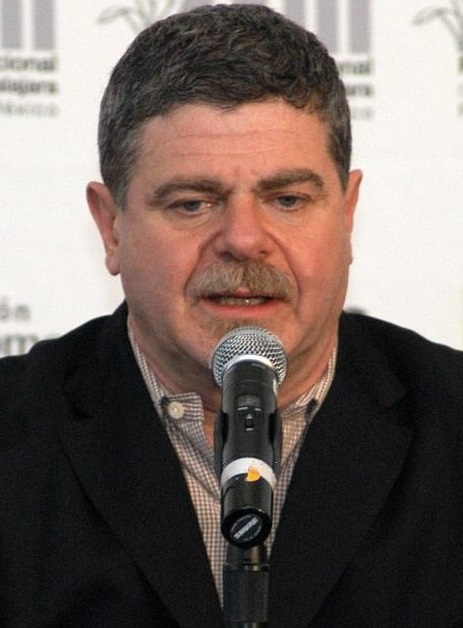
Gustavo Santaolalla, Best Original Score winner

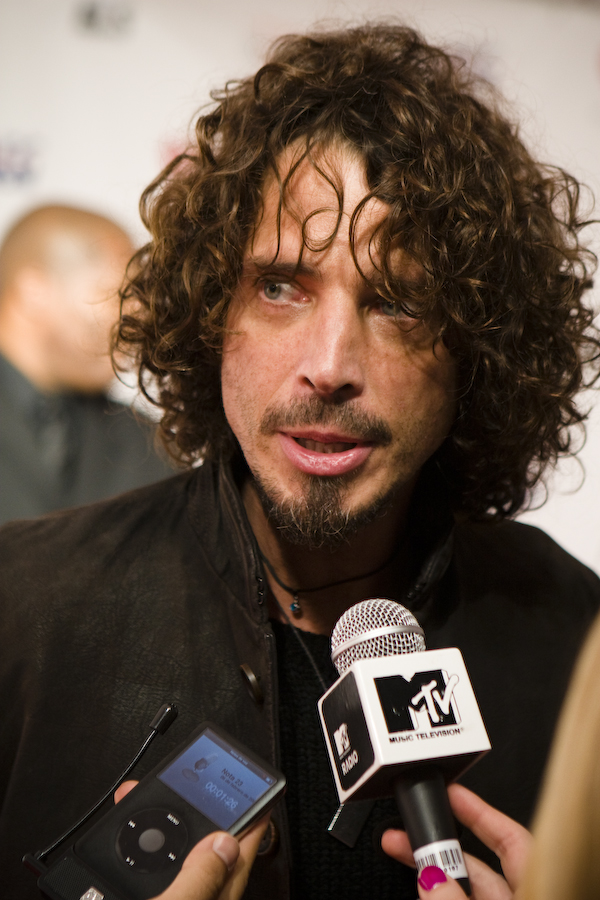
Chris Cornell, Best Original Song winner

=== Best Actor – Drama ===
Forest Whitaker – The Last King of Scotland

- Leonardo DiCaprio – Blood Diamond
- Ryan Gosling – Half Nelson
- Joshua Jackson – Aurora Borealis
- Derek Luke – Catch a Fire
- Patrick Wilson – Little Children

=== Best Actor – Musical or Comedy ===
Joseph Cross – Running with Scissors

- Sacha Baron Cohen – Borat: Cultural Learnings of America for Make Benefit Glorious Nation of Kazakhstan
- Aaron Eckhart – Thank You for Smoking
- Will Ferrell – Stranger than Fiction
- Peter O'Toole – Venus

=== Best Actress – Drama ===
Helen Mirren – The Queen

- Penélope Cruz – To Return (Volver)
- Judi Dench – Notes on a Scandal
- Maggie Gyllenhaal – Sherrybaby
- Gretchen Mol – The Notorious Bettie Page
- Kate Winslet – Little Children

=== Best Actress – Musical or Comedy ===
Meryl Streep – The Devil Wears Prada

- Annette Bening – Running with Scissors
- Beyoncé – Dreamgirls
- Toni Collette – Little Miss Sunshine
- Julie Walters – Driving Lessons
- Jodie Whittaker – Venus

=== Best Animated or Mixed Media Film ===
Pan's Labyrinth (El laberinto del fauno)

- Cars
- Flushed Away
- Happy Feet
- Ice Age: The Meltdown

=== Best Art Direction and Production Design ===
Flags of Our Fathers – Henry Bumstead, Richard Goddard, and Jack G. Taylor Jr.

- Dreamgirls
- Marie Antoinette
- Pan's Labyrinth (El laberinto del fauno)
- V for Vendetta

=== Best Cinematography ===
Flags of Our Fathers – Tom Stern

- The Black Dahlia
- Curse of the Golden Flower (Man cheng jin dai huang jin jia)
- The Fountain
- A Good Year
- The House of Sand (Casa de Areia)
- X-Men: The Last Stand

=== Best Costume Design ===
The Devil Wears Prada – Patricia Field

- The Black Dahlia
- Dreamgirls
- Curse of the Golden Flower (Man cheng jin dai huang jin jia)
- Marie Antoinette

=== Best Director ===
Bill Condon – Dreamgirls (TIE)
Clint Eastwood – Flags of Our Fathers (TIE)

- Pedro Almodóvar – To Return (Volver)
- Stephen Frears – The Queen
- Alejandro González Iñárritu – Babel
- Martin Scorsese – The Departed

=== Best Documentary Film ===
Deliver Us from Evil

- An Inconvenient Truth
- Jonestown: The Life and Death of Peoples Temple
- Leonard Cohen: I'm Your Man
- The U.S. vs. John Lennon
- The War Tapes

=== Best Editing ===
X-Men: The Last Stand – Mark Helfrich, Mark Goldblatt, and Julia Wong

- Babel
- Dreamgirls
- Flags of Our Fathers
- Miami Vice

=== Best Film – Drama ===
The Departed

- Babel
- Flags of Our Fathers
- Half Nelson
- The Last King of Scotland
- Little Children
- The Queen

=== Best Film – Musical or Comedy ===
Dreamgirls

- The Devil Wears Prada
- Little Miss Sunshine
- Stranger than Fiction
- Thank You for Smoking
- Venus

=== Best Foreign Language Film ===
To Return (Volver), Spain

- Apocalypto, United States
- Changing Times (Les temps qui changent), France
- The Lives of Others (Das Leben der Anderen), Germany
- The Syrian Bride, Israel
- Water, Canada

=== Best Original Score ===
"Babel" – Gustavo Santaolalla

- "Brick" – Nathan Johnson
- "The Da Vinci Code" – Hans Zimmer
- "Flags of Our Fathers" – Clint Eastwood
- "The Lives of Others (Das Leben der Anderen)" – Gabriel Yared
- "Notes on a Scandal" – Philip Glass

=== Best Original Song ===
"You Know My Name" performed by Chris Cornell – Casino Royale

- "Listen" – Dreamgirls
- "Love You I Do" – Dreamgirls
- "Never Let Go" – The Guardian
- "Till the End of Time" – Little Miss Sunshine
- "Upside Down" – Curious George

=== Best Screenplay – Adapted ===
The Departed – William Monahan

- Dreamgirls – Bill Condon
- Flags of Our Fathers – William Broyles Jr. and Paul Haggis
- Little Children – Todd Field and Tom Perrotta
- A Prairie Home Companion – Garrison Keillor
- Thank You for Smoking – Jason Reitman

=== Best Screenplay – Original ===
The Queen – Peter Morgan

- Babel – Guillermo Arriaga and Alejandro González Iñárritu
- Changing Times (Les temps qui changent) – Pascal Bonitzer, Laurent Guyot, and André Téchiné
- The House of Sand (Casa de Areia) – Luiz Carlos Barreto, Elena Soarez, and Andrucha Waddington
- To Return (Volver) – Pedro Almodóvar
- The Wind That Shakes the Barley – Paul Laverty

=== Best Sound ===
Dreamgirls

- Babel
- The Da Vinci Code
- Flags of Our Fathers
- X-Men: The Last Stand

=== Best Supporting Actor ===
Leonardo DiCaprio – The Departed

- Alan Arkin – Little Miss Sunshine
- Adam Beach – Flags of Our Fathers
- Jack Nicholson – The Departed
- Brad Pitt – Babel
- Donald Sutherland – Aurora Borealis

=== Best Supporting Actress ===
Jennifer Hudson – Dreamgirls

- Cate Blanchett – Notes on a Scandal
- Abigail Breslin – Little Miss Sunshine
- Blythe Danner – The Last Kiss
- Rinko Kikuchi – Babel
- Lily Tomlin – A Prairie Home Companion

=== Best Visual Effects ===
Pirates of the Caribbean: Dead Man's Chest

- The Da Vinci Code
- Flags of Our Fathers
- The Fountain
- Pan's Labyrinth (El laberinto del fauno)
- V for Vendetta
- X-Men: The Last Stand

=== Outstanding Motion Picture Ensemble ===
The Departed

== Television winners and nominees ==
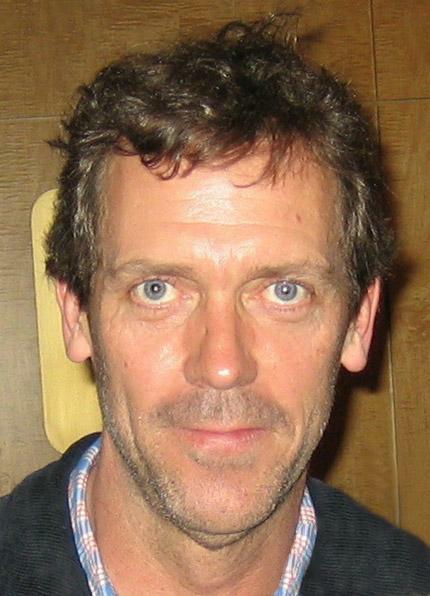
Hugh Laurie, Best Actor in a Drama Series winner

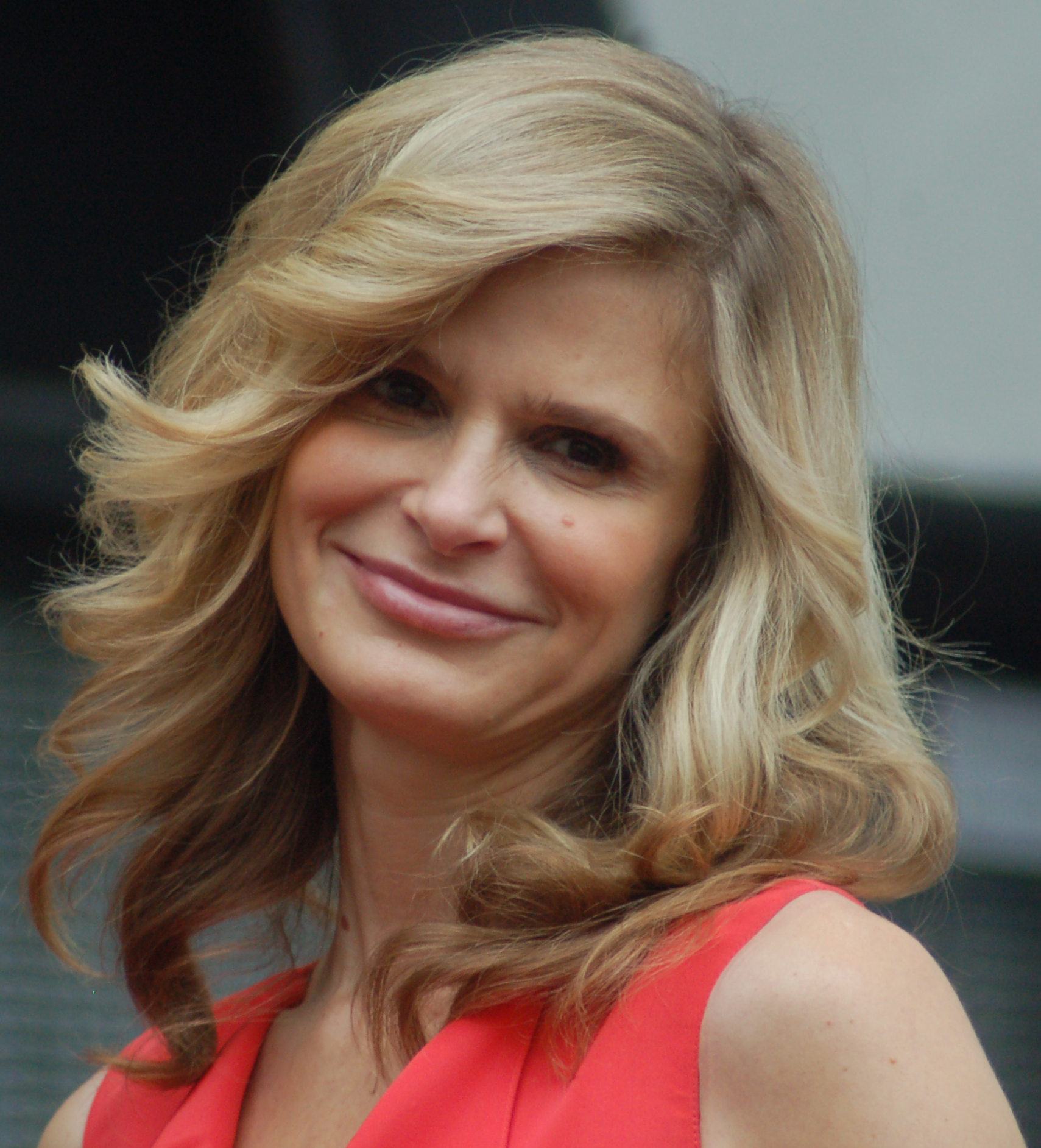
Kyra Sedwick, Best Actress in a Drama Series winner

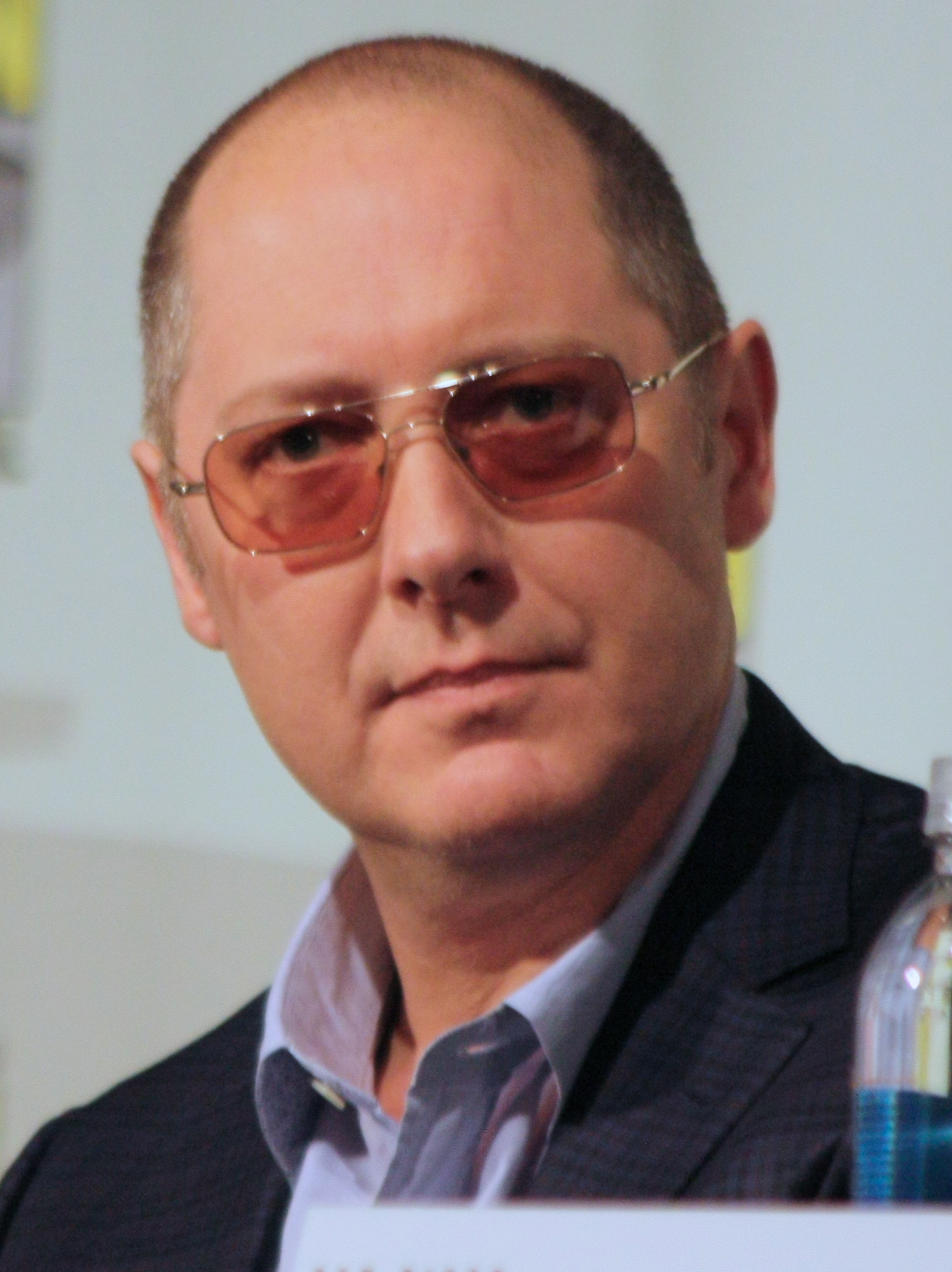
James Spader, Best Actor in a Comedy or Musical Series winner

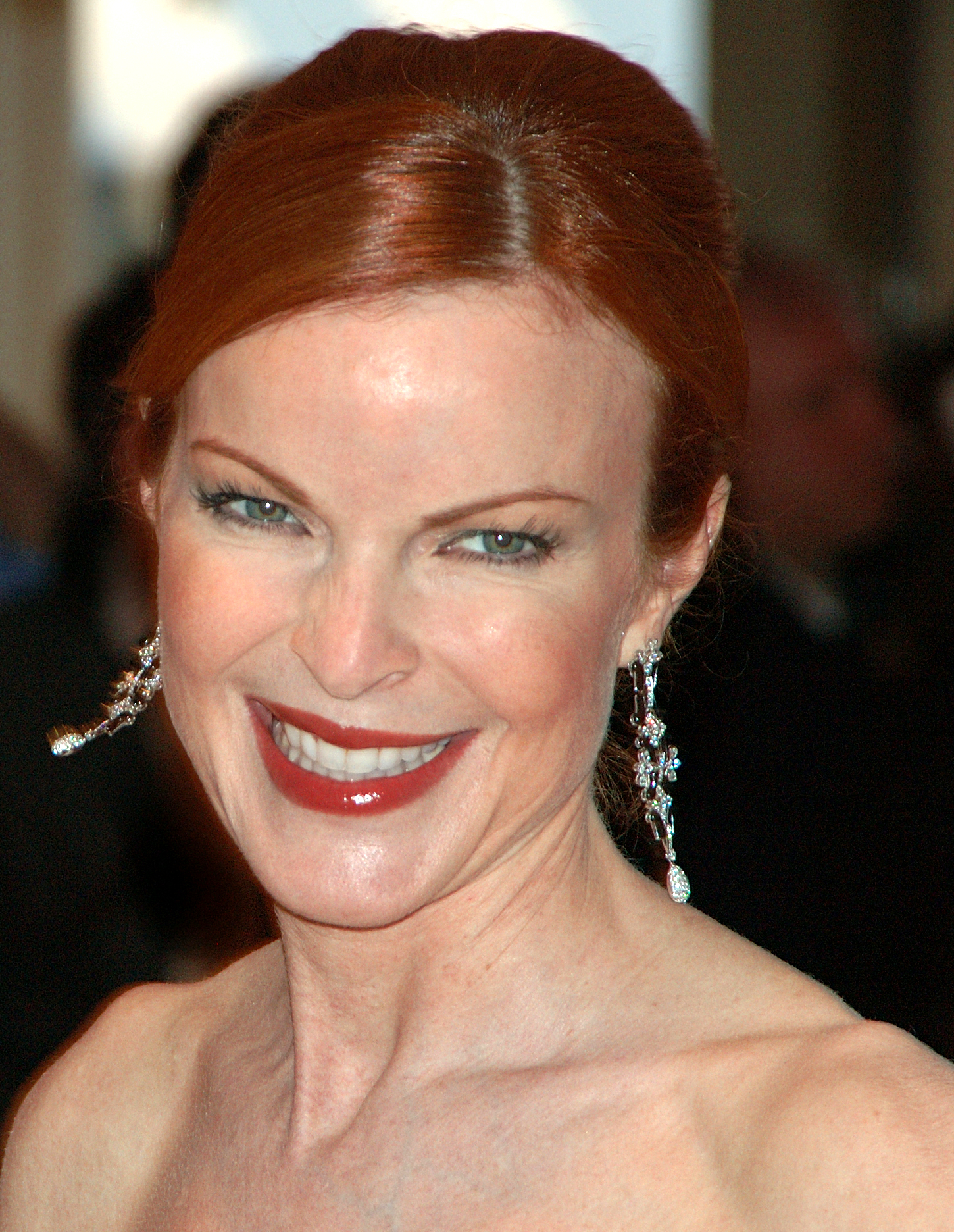
Marcia Cross, Best Actress in a Comedy or Musical Series winner

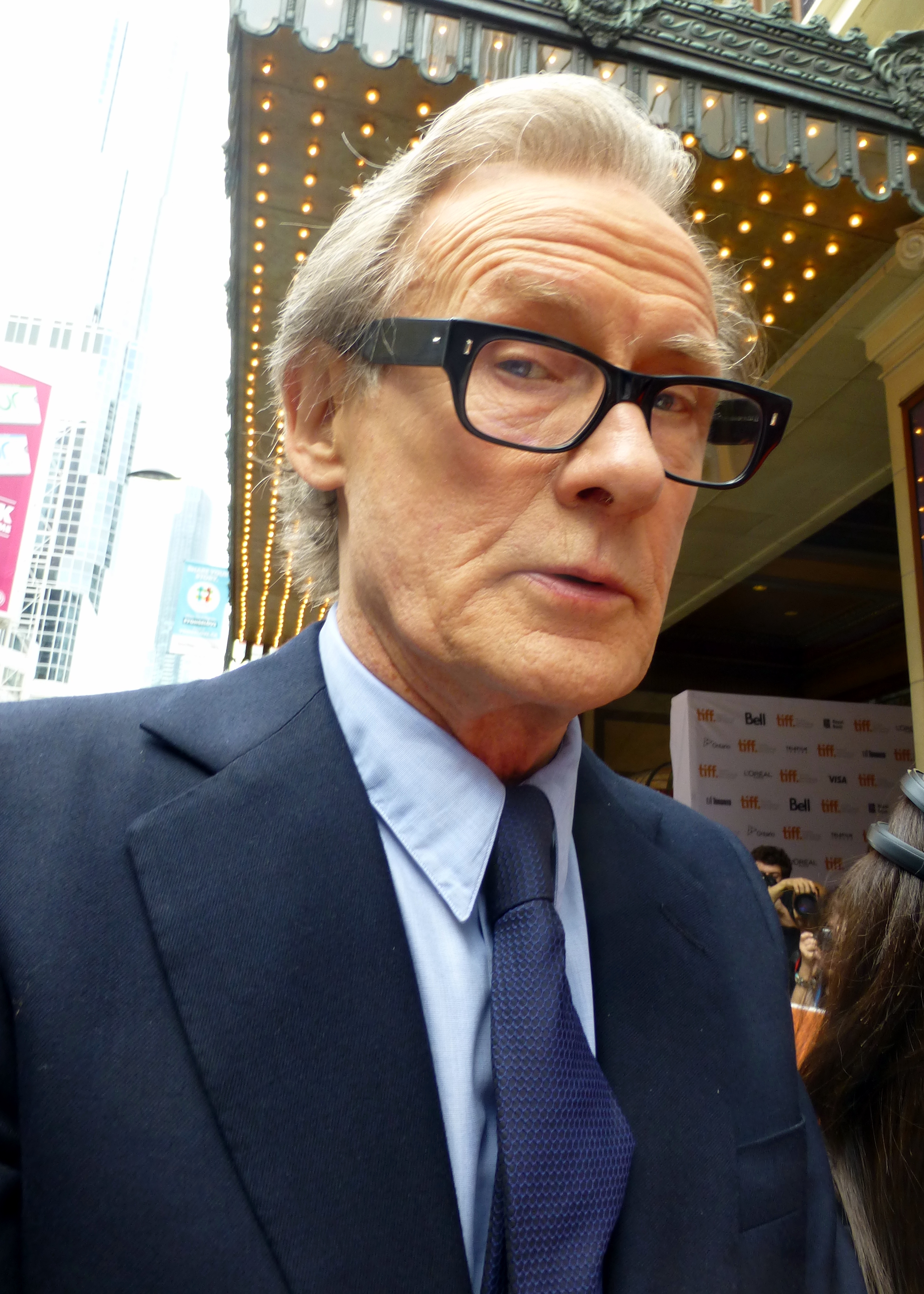
Bill Nighy, Best Actor in a Miniseries or Television Film winner

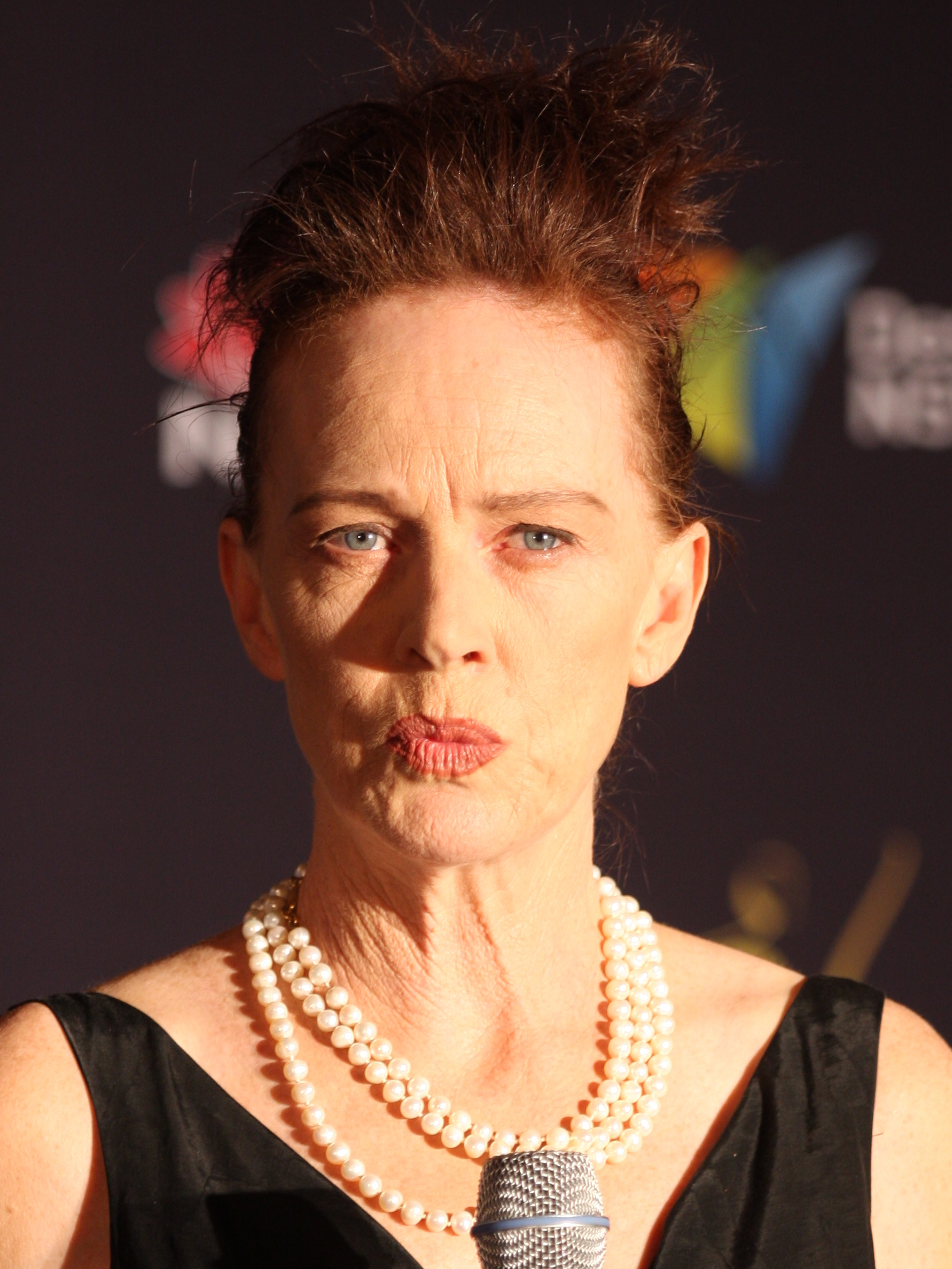
Judy Davis, Best Actress in a Miniseries or Television Film winner

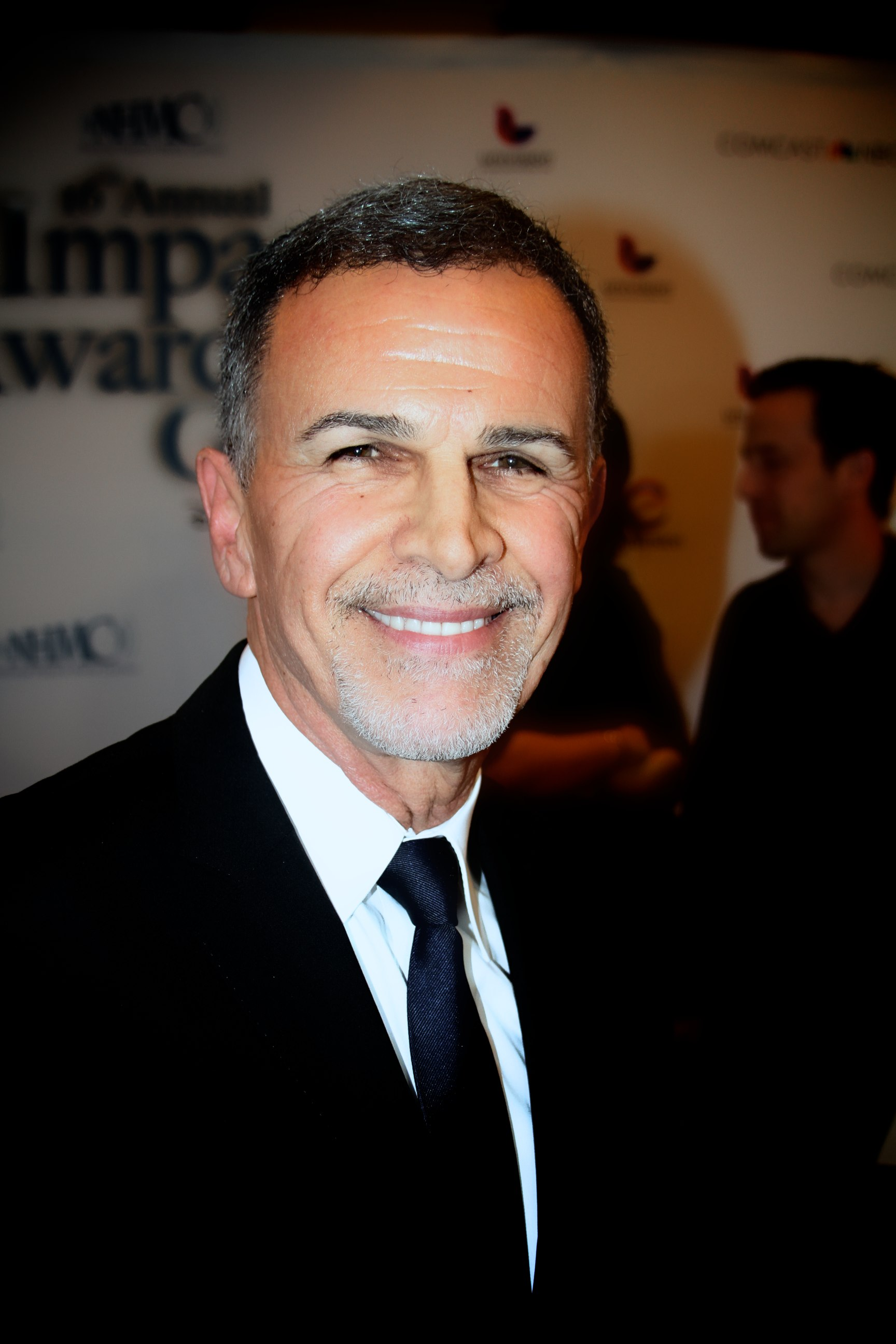
Tony Plana, Best Supporting Actor in a Series, Miniseries, or Television Film winner

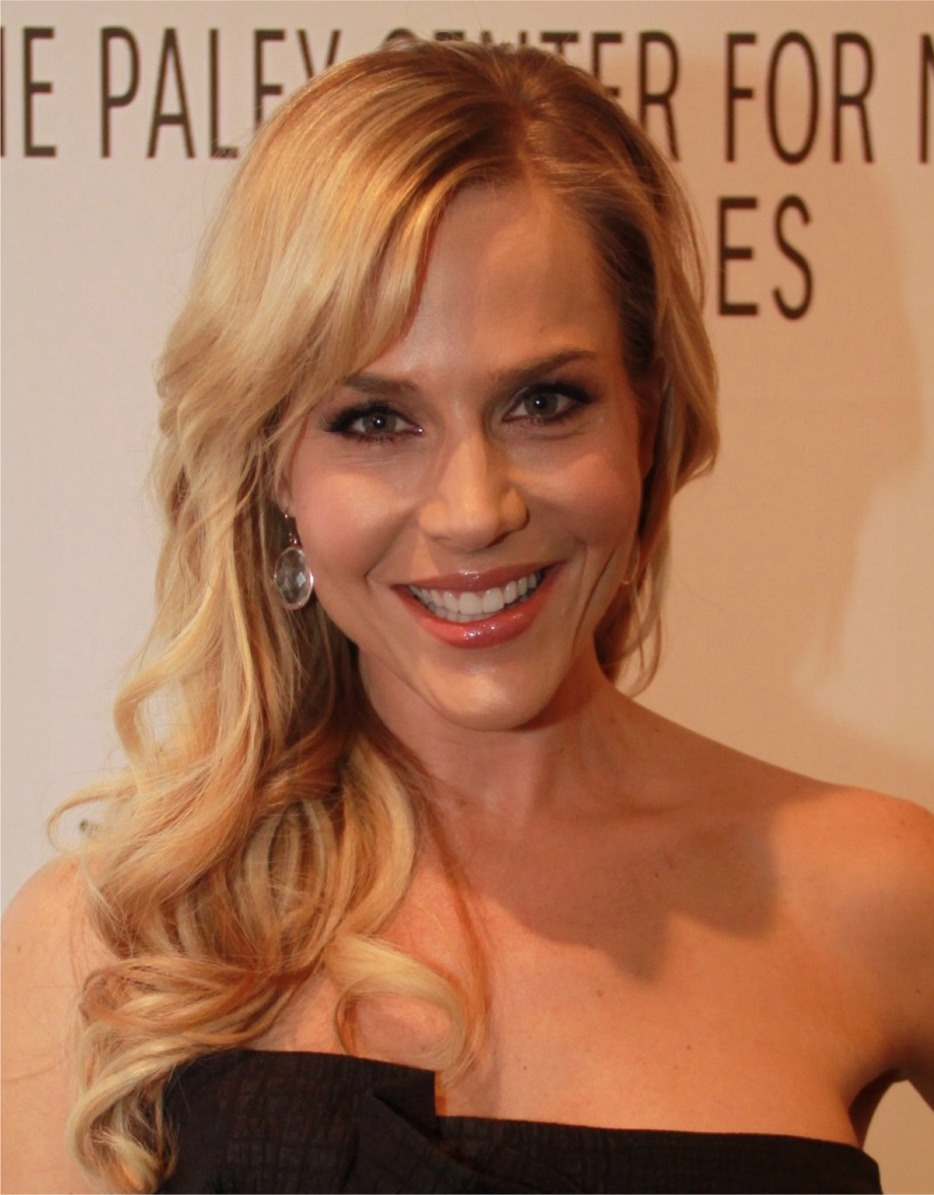
Julie Benz, Best Supporting Actress in a Series, Miniseries, or Television Film winner

=== Best Actor – Drama Series ===
Hugh Laurie – House, M.D.

- Michael C. Hall – Dexter
- Denis Leary – Rescue Me
- Bill Paxton – Big Love
- Matthew Perry – Studio 60 on the Sunset Strip
- Bradley Whitford – Studio 60 on the Sunset Strip

=== Best Actor – Musical or Comedy Series ===
James Spader – Boston Legal

- Steve Carell – The Office
- Stephen Colbert – The Colbert Report
- Ted Danson – Help Me Help You
- Jason Lee – My Name Is Earl
- James Roday – Psych

=== Best Actor – Miniseries or TV Film ===
Bill Nighy – Gideon's Daughter

- Andre Braugher – Thief
- Charles Dance – Bleak House
- Hugh Dancy – Elizabeth I
- Ben Kingsley – Mrs. Harris

=== Best Actress – Drama Series ===
Kyra Sedgwick – The Closer

- Kristen Bell – Veronica Mars
- Emily Deschanel – Bones
- Sarah Paulson – Studio 60 on the Sunset Strip
- Amanda Peet – Studio 60 on the Sunset Strip
- Jeanne Tripplehorn – Big Love

=== Best Actress – Musical or Comedy Series ===
Marcia Cross – Desperate Housewives

- America Ferrera – Ugly Betty
- Laura Kightlinger – The Minor Accomplishments of Jackie Woodman
- Lisa Kudrow – The Comeback
- Julia Louis-Dreyfus – The New Adventures of Old Christine
- Mary-Louise Parker – Weeds

=== Best Actress – Miniseries or TV Film ===
Judy Davis – A Little Thing Called Murder

- Gillian Anderson – Bleak House
- Annette Bening – Mrs. Harris
- Helen Mirren – Elizabeth I
- Miranda Richardson – Gideon's Daughter

=== Best Miniseries ===
To the Ends of the Earth

- Bleak House
- Casanova
- Elizabeth I
- Thief

=== Best Series – Drama ===
House, M.D.

- 24
- Dexter
- Heroes
- Rescue Me
- The Wire

=== Best Series – Musical or Comedy ===
Ugly Betty

- The Colbert Report
- Entourage
- Everybody Hates Chris
- The Office

=== Best Supporting Actor – Miniseries or TV Film ===
Tony Plana – Ugly Betty

- Michael Emerson – Lost
- Philip Baker Hall – The Loop
- Robert Knepper – Prison Break
- Jeremy Piven – Entourage
- Forest Whitaker – The Shield

=== Best Supporting Actress – Miniseries or TV Film ===
Julie Benz – Dexter

- Fionnula Flanagan – Brotherhood
- Laurie Metcalf – Desperate Housewives
- Elizabeth Perkins – Weeds
- Jean Smart – 24
- Vanessa Williams – Ugly Betty

=== Best TV Film ===
A Little Thing Called Murder

- Gideon's Daughter
- High School Musical
- In from the Night
- Mrs. Harris

=== Outstanding Television Ensemble ===
Grey's Anatomy

== New Media winners and nominees ==
=== Best Classic DVD ===
The Conformist

- State Fair, Oklahoma!, Carousel, The King and I, South Pacific, and The Sound of Music For the "Rodgers & Hammerstein Box Set Collection".
- The Wild Bunch, Pat Garrett and Billy the Kid, Ride the High Country, and The Ballad of Cable Hogue For "Sam Peckinpah's Legendary Westerns Collection".
- Flying Down to Rio, The Gay Divorcee, Roberta, Top Hat, Follow the Fleet, Swing Time, Shall We Dance, Carefree, The Story of Vernon and Irene Castle, and The Barkleys of Broadway For the "Astaire & Rogers Ultimate Collector's Edition".
- Breakfast at Tiffany's For the "Anniversary Edition".
- Cabin in the Sky
- Grease
- 1900
- Valley of the Dolls
- The Wicker Man

=== Best Documentary DVD ===
An Inconvenient Truth

- 49 Up
- Andy Warhol: A Documentary
- The Aristocrats
- Dave Chappelle's Block Party
- Independent Lens For episode "Enron: The Smartest Guys in the Room (#8.22)".
- Marie Antoinette
- Pornography: A Secret History of Civilisation
- Thinking XXX
- Wordplay

=== Best DVD Extras ===
Mission: Impossible III

- Harry Potter and the Philosopher's Stone, Harry Potter and the Chamber of Secrets, Harry Potter and the Prisoner of Azkaban, and Harry Potter and the Goblet of Fire For "Harry Potter Years 1-4".
- The Chronicles of Narnia: The Lion, the Witch and the Wardrobe
- Corpse Bride
- The Da Vinci Code
- Good Night, and Good Luck
- The New World
- The Omen
- The Poseidon Adventure
- The Towering Inferno

=== Best DVD Release of TV Shows ===
The Simpsons For "The Complete Eighth Season".

- Alias For "The Complete Fifth Season".
- Desperate Housewives For "The Complete Second Season".
- Mission: Impossible For "The Complete First Season".
- Police Squad! For "The Complete Series".
- Six Feet Under For "The Complete Series Gift Set".
- Slings & Arrows For "Season Two".
- Liza with a Z For "Collector's Edition".

=== Outstanding Action/Adventure Game ===
New Super Mario Bros.

- F.E.A.R.: First Encounter Assault Recon
- Ghost Recon Advanced Warfighter
- Metroid Prime Hunters
- Ōkami

=== Outstanding Game Based on a Previous Medium ===
Kingdom Hearts II

- Lego Star Wars II: The Original Trilogy
- The Lord of the Rings: The Battle for Middle-Earth II
- Scarface: The World Is Yours
- Star Wars: Empire at War

=== Outstanding Overall DVD ===
Superman, Superman II, Superman II: The Richard Donner Cut, Superman III, Superman IV: The Quest for Peace, Superman Returns For the "Superman Ultimate Collector's Edition".

- Capote
- Good Night, and Good Luck
- A History of Violence
- Jarhead
- Les temps qui changent
- Pandora's Box
- Symbiopsychotaxiplasm: Take 2 1/2
- V for Vendetta

=== Outstanding Puzzle/Strategy Game ===
Company of Heroes

- Dr. Kawashima's Brain Training: How Old Is Your Brain?
- Galactic Civilizations II: Dread Lords
- Mercury Meltdown
- Tetris DS

=== Outstanding Role Playing Game ===
The Elder Scrolls IV: Oblivion

- Final Fantasy XII
- Kingdom Hearts II
- Marvel: Ultimate Alliance
- Neverwinter Nights 2

=== Outstanding Sports Game ===
FIFA 07

- MLB '06: The Show
- NCAA Football 2007
- Pro Evolution Soccer 5
- Rockstar Games Presents Table Tennis

=== Outstanding Youth DVD ===
The Little Mermaid

- Akeelah and the Bee
- Cars
- Eight Below
- The Greatest Game Ever Played
- Ice Age: The Meltdown
- Lady and the Tramp
- Nanny McPhee
- Wallace & Gromit: The Curse of the Were-Rabbit

== Awards breakdown ==
=== Film ===
Winners:

4 / 6 The Departed: Best Film – Drama / Best Screenplay – Adapted / Best Supporting Actor / Outstanding Motion Picture Ensemble
4 / 11 Dreamgirls: Best Film – Musical or Comedy / Best Director & Sound / Best Supporting Actress
3 / 10 Flags of Our Fathers: Best Art Direction and Production Design / Best Cinematography & Director
2 / 3 The Devil Wears Prada: Best Actress – Musical or Comedy / Best Costume Design
2 / 4 The Queen: Best Actress – Drama / Best Screenplay – Original
1 / 1 Casino Royale: Best Original Song
1 / 1 Deliver Us from Evil: Best Documentary Film
1 / 1 Pirates of the Caribbean: Dead Man's Chest: Best Visual Effects
1 / 2 The Last King of Scotland: Best Actor – Drama
1 / 2 Running with Scissors: Best Actor – Musical or Comedy
1 / 3 Pan's Labyrinth (El laberinto del fauno): Best Animated or Mixed Media Film
1 / 4 To Return (Volver): Best Foreign Language Film
1 / 4 X-Men: The Last Stand: Best Editing
1 / 8 Babel: Best Original Score

Losers:

0 / 5 Little Miss Sunshine
0 / 4 Little Children
0 / 3 The Da Vinci Code, Notes on a Scandal, Thank You for Smoking, Venus
0 / 2 Aurora Borealis, The Black Dahlia, Changing Times (Les temps qui changent), Curse of the Golden Flower (Man cheng jin dai huang jin jia), The Fountain, Half Nelson, The House of Sand (Casa de Areia), The Lives of Others (Das Leben der Anderen), Marie Antoinette, A Prairie Home Companion, Stranger than Fiction, V for Vendetta

=== Television ===
Winners:

2 / 2 House, M.D.: Best Actor – Drama Series / Best Series – Drama
2 / 2 A Little Thing Called Murder: Best Actress – Miniseries or TV Film / Best TV Film
2 / 4 Ugly Betty: Best Series – Musical or Comedy Series / Best Supporting Actor – Miniseries or TV Film
1 / 1 Boston Legal: Best Actor – Musical or Comedy Series
1 / 1 The Closer: Best Actress – Drama Series
1 / 1 To the Ends of the Earth: Best Miniseries
1 / 1 Grey's Anatomy: Outstanding Television Ensemble
1 / 2 Desperate Housewives: Best Actress – Musical or Comedy Series
1 / 3 Dexter: Best Supporting Actress – Miniseries or TV Film
1 / 3 Gideon's Daughter: Best Actor – Miniseries or TV Film

Losers:

0 / 4 Studio 60 on the Sunset Strip
0 / 3 Bleak House, Elizabeth I, Mrs. Harris
0 / 2 24, Big Love, The Colbert Report, Entourage, The Office, Rescue Me, Thief, Weeds
