= Lou Roy-Lecollinet =

French actress (born 1996)

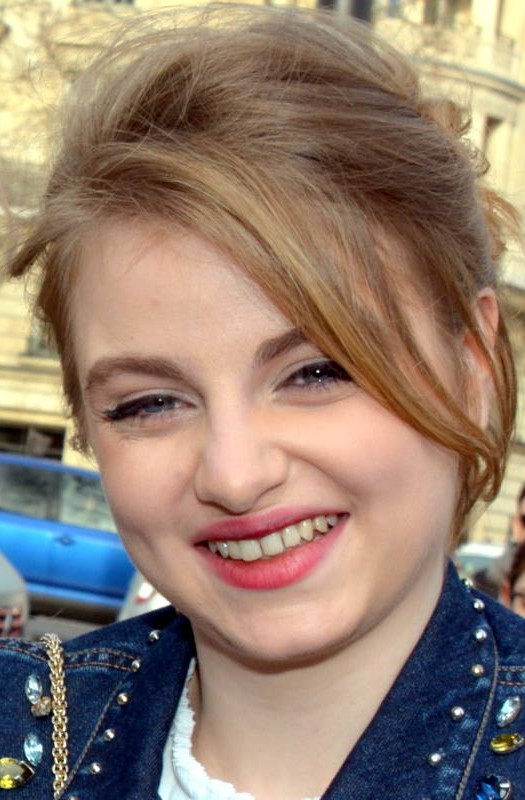
- Lou Roy-Lecollinet in February 2016
- Born: 1 August 1996 (age 30)
- Occupation: Actress
- Years active: 2015-present

Lou Roy-Lecollinet (born 1 August 1996) is a French actress. She was nominated for the César Award for Most Promising Actress in 2016 for her role in the film My Golden Days.

== Life and career ==
Lou Roy-Lecollinet was born in Saint-Maur-des-Fossés, a suburb of Paris. While still a lycée pupil, and following the advice of her drama teacher, she auditioned for a role in the film My Golden Days, directed by Arnaud Desplechin. In interviews, she has claimed that she became an actress almost by chance. She told one interviewer, "I didn’t want to be an actress. I wanted to direct plays onstage."

The film, a prequel to the director's earlier My Sex Life... or How I Got into an Argument (1996), was presented at the 2015 Cannes Film Festival. She was nominated for the César Award for Most Promising Actress for her role in it.

Roy-Lecollinet guest starred in the music video for Danny L Harle's song "Broken Flowers" in 2016, released on British label PC Music.

== Filmography ==
Year	Title	Role	Director	Notes
2015	My Golden Days	Esther	Arnaud Desplechin	Nominated - César Award for Most Promising Actress; Nominated - Lumière Award for Best Female Revelation
2016	Petit homme	Nat	Nathanaël Guedj	Short
2016	Jeunesse	Young woman	Shanti Masud	Short
2016	La tortue	Julie	Thomas Blumenthal & Roman Dopouridis	Short
2017	I Got Life!	Lucie Tabort	Blandine Lenoir	
2017	Paris etc	Allison	Zabou Breitman	TV series (12 episodes)
2018	Fiertés	Young Aurélie	Philippe Faucon	TV series (1 episode)
2023	La chimera	Mélodie	Alice Rohrwacher	
