= Two Pianos =

Upcoming French film by Arnaud Desplechin

- French: Deux pianos
- Directed by: Arnaud Desplechin
- Written by: Arnaud Desplechin
- Produced by: Pascal Caucheteux
- Starring: François Civil; Nadia Tereszkiewicz; Charlotte Rampling; Hippolyte Girardot
- Cinematography: Paul Guilhaume
- Edited by: Laurence Briaud
- Music by: Grégoire Hetzel
- Production companies: Why Not Productions; Arte France Cinéma
- Distributed by: Le Pacte
- Release dates: 10 September 2025 (TIFF); 15 October 2025 (France)
- Country: France
- Language: French
- Box office: $2 million

Two Pianos (French: Deux pianos) is a 2025 French romantic drama film directed by Arnaud Desplechin, starring François Civil as a virtuoso French pianist who returns from Asia to experience an impossible love story in his hometown of Lyon. The cast includes Nadia Tereszkiewicz, Charlotte Rampling and Hippolyte Girardot.

The film had its world premiere in the Gala Presentations section of the 2025 Toronto International Film Festival on 10 September 2025, and was released theatrically in France on 15 October 2025 by Le Pacte.

== Plot ==
The story follows the career of Mathias, a virtuoso French pianist who lived in Asia for many years and returns to his hometown of Lyon to experience an impossible love story.

== Cast ==
- François Civil as Mathias Vogler
- Nadia Tereszkiewicz as Claude
- Charlotte Rampling as Elena
- Hippolyte Girardot

== Production ==
=== Development ===
On 30 September 2024, Arte France Cinéma announced that it would co-produce along with Why Not Productions the next film directed by Arnaud Desplechin, Une affaire, starring François Civil as a virtuoso pianist who lives an impossible love story, and that Nadia Tereszkiewicz, Charlotte Rampling and Hippolyte Girardot would also star in the film that is set in the city of Lyon.

On 6 June 2025, it was reported that the title was changed to Deux pianos.

=== Filming ===
Principal photography began in Lyon, France on 18 October 2024. Filming locations included the Parilly train station and the streets of Vieux Lyon. Shooting wrapped in December 2024.

== Release ==
The film was originally set to be released theatrically in 2026, but it had its world premiere in the Gala Presentations section of the 2025 Toronto International Film Festival on 10 September 2025. For its European premiere, the film was added to the competition lineup of the 73rd San Sebastián International Film Festival. The film was released in France on 15 October 2025 by Le Pacte.

It was screened in non-competitive section 'Grand public' of the 20th Rome Film Festival in October 2025. The film will be released in the United States on 8 May 2026.

=== Critical response ===
On review aggregator Rotten Tomatoes, 82% of 22 critics gave the film a positive review, with an average rating of 6.0/10. Critic Scout Tafoya of RogerEbert.com named Two Pianos as the best film of 2025, which he tied with director Arnaud Desplechin's other film Filmlovers!.
