= Stéphane Fontaine =

French cinematographer

- Years active: 1988–present

Stéphane Fontaine is a French cinematographer.

He graduated from the École nationale supérieure Louis-Lumière in 1985, and began his career as first assistant camera.

== Filmography ==
=== Feature film ===
Year	Title	Director
1996	My Sex Life... or How I Got into an Argument (Note: Shared credit with Éric Gautier and Dominique Perrier-Royer)	Arnaud Desplechin
2000	Bronx-Barbès	Éliane de Latour
2002	La Vie nouvelle	Philippe Grandrieux
2003	Playing 'In the Company of Men'	Arnaud Desplechin
2004	Look at Me	Agnès Jaoui
2005	The Beat That My Heart Skipped	Jacques Audiard
2006	Charlie Says	Nicole Garcia
2006	Call Me Elisabeth	Jean-Pierre Améris
2007	Talk to Me	Kasi Lemmons
2008	What Just Happened	Barry Levinson
2009	Espion(s)	Nicolas Saada
2009	A Prophet	Jacques Audiard
2010	Dumas	Safy Nebbou
2010	The Next Three Days	Paul Haggis
2011	Goodbye First Love	Mia Hansen-Løve
2012	Rust and Bone	Jacques Audiard
2013	Jimmy P: Psychotherapy of a Plains Indian	Arnaud Desplechin
2014	Samba	Éric Toledano; Olivier Nakache
2016	Captain Fantastic	Matt Ross
2016	Elle	Paul Verhoeven
2016	Jackie	Pablo Larraín
2019	The Kill Team	Dan Krauss
2019	My Zoe	Julie Delpy
2020	Ammonite	Francis Lee
2022	Paris Memories	Alice Winocour
2024	Conclave	Edward Berger

== Awards and nominations ==
Year	Award	Category	Title	Result
2024	BAFTA Awards	Best Cinematography	Conclave	Nominated
2005	César Awards	Best Cinematography	The Beat That My Heart Skipped	Won
2009	César Awards	Best Cinematography	A Prophet	Won
2012	César Awards	Best Cinematography	Rust and Bone	Nominated
2016	César Awards	Best Cinematography	Elle	Nominated
2009	European Film Award	Best Cinematographer	A Prophet	Nominated
2013	Lumière Awards	Best Cinematography	Jimmy P: Psychotherapy of a Plains Indian	Nominated

== Decorations ==
- Chevalier of the Order of Arts and Letters (2015)
