= Malik Zidi =

French actor (born 1975)

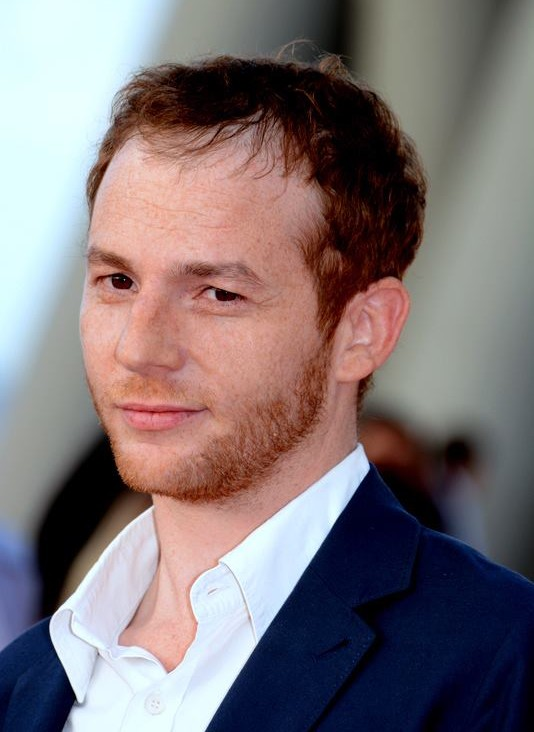
- Malik Zidi in 2013
- Born: 14 February 1975 (age 51); Châtenay-Malabry, France
- Occupation: Actor
- Years active: 1996-present

Malik Zidi (born 14 February 1975) is a French film, television and theatre actor. He is a César Award recipient for Most Promising Actor.

== Life and career ==
Malik Zidi was born in Châtenay-Malabry to a Kabyle Algerian father and a Breton mother. He spent his formative years in Saint-Maur-des-Fossés, a suburb of Paris. Zidi abandoned his conventional studies early to concentrate on a career in comedy. Following courses at the Théâtre Véronique Nordey, and the Théâtre de Proposition in Paris, he briefly studied acrobatics and mime at the Théâtre de la Piscine and cinema at the Studio Pygmalion. Zidi made his first film appearance in the 1998 Sébastien Lifshitz-directed Les Corps ouverts.

In 2000, Zidi was chosen by director François Ozon to appear as the troubled, lovelorn, bisexual youth Franz in the Teddy Award-winning film Water Drops on Burning Rocks (French:Gouttes d'eau sur pierres brûlantes). The film was based on the play Tropfen auf heisse Steine by German film director and screenwriter Rainer Werner Fassbinder. The film is a four-part comedy-drama shot entirely on one set and featuring only four actors: Zidi, Bernard Giraudeau, Ludivine Sagnier and American actress Anna Levine. Zidi's role in Water Drops on Burning Rocks garnered him his first of four César Award nominations.

Malik Zidi followed up with roles in the 2002 Antoine Santana-directed A Moment of Happiness opposite Isild Le Besco, earning his second César Award nomination for Most Promising Actor. In 2004, he appeared in the André Téchiné-directed romantic drama Les Temps qui changent (English release title: Changing Times) as Sami, the bisexual son of Cécile (portrayed by Catherine Deneuve), who visits his parents in Tangiers so that he may visit his Moroccan boyfriend. The film also starred actor Gérard Depardieu and was nominated for a Satellite Award. Zidi received his third César Award nomination.

In 2006, Zidi appeared in the Emmanuel Bourdieu-drama Les Amitiés maléfiques (English release title: Poison Friends). The film was showcased at the Cannes Film Festival and Bourdieu received the Critics Week Grand Prize and the Grand Golden Rail. The film also won the SACD Screenwriting Award and Zidi was once again nominated for a César Award, winning the Award for Most Promising Actor 2007.

In addition to film, Zidi has appeared in numerous television roles.

In 2020, Zidi penned his first novel L'ombre du soir, which was published by Éditions Anne Carrière.

== Personal life ==
Zidi currently resides in the Ile-de-France. He lists Michel Piccoli and Laurent Terzieff as his "heroes" and is a jazz aficionado.

== Filmography ==
Year	Title	Role	Notes
1998	Open Bodies	Classroom mate	
1998	Place Vendôme	Sam's Son	
1998	Le Onzième commandement		
2000	Water Drops on Burning Rocks	Franz	Nominated—César Award for Most Promising Actor
2000	The Judge Is a Woman	Yvan	TV series
2000	Deuxième vie	The cybercafé waiter	
2001	Vertiges	Nico	TV series
2001	Sa mère, la pute	Bimbo	Telefilm
2001	A Moment of Happiness	Philippe	Nominated—César Award for Most Promising Actor
2002	Almost Peaceful	Joseph	
2002	Froid comme l'été	Baudelaire	
2003	My Children Are Different	Thomas	
2003	The Thibaults	Jacques Thibault	TV mini-series
2004	Sissi, l'impératrice rebelle	Rodolphe	Telefilm
2004	Old Goriot	Eugène de Rastignac	Telefilm
2004	Changing Times	Sami	Nominated—César Award for Most Promising Actor
2005	Looking for Cheyenne	Pierre	
2005	Les Rois maudits	Philippe VI de Valois	TV miniseries
2006	Beyond the Ocean	Bruno	
2006	Poison Friends	Eloi Duhaut	César Award for Most Promising Actor; Nominated—Lumière Award for Most Promising Actor
2006	Le Grand Meaulnes	Franz	
2007	Jacquou le Croquant	Touffu	
2007	Les Camarades	François	TV mini-series
2007	Les Zygs, le secret des disparus	Jean / Béjean	Telefilm
2007	Le Baiser	The man	Short film
2007	Faits divers	Franck	Short film
2008	Rendez-vous au tas de sable...	Vincent	Short film
2008	Miroir, mon beau miroir	Lepic	Telefilm
2008	La Mort n'oublie personne	Jean Ricouart	Telefilm
2008	Geliebte Clara	Johannes Brahms	
2009	Après moi	Hugo	Telefilm
2009	Ex	Marc	
2009	Un chat un chat	Antoine	
2009	Venus and Apollo	Paul	
2009	Sweet France	Mourad Chaouche	Telefilm
2009	The Queen of Clubs	Aurélien	
2010	Mysteries of Lisbon	Visconde de Armagnac	
2011	Mysteries of Lisbon	Visconde de Armagnac	TV mini-series
2011	Rebellion	JP Perrot	
2012	The Gordji Affair	Luc Delair	Telefilm
2012	Le Silence et l'Oubli	Emmanuel	Short film
2012	Lines of Wellington	Octave de Ségur	
2012	Berthe Morisot	Édouard Manet	Telefilm
2012	As Linhas de Torres Vedras	Octave de Ségur	TV mini-series
2012	A Child of Yours	Victor	
2013	Amaro amore	Andrè	
2013	The Marchers	Philippe	
2013	Loulou, l'incroyable secret	Loulou (voice)	Animated film
2013	Robbery on the Champs-Élysées	Mathieu	Short film
2014	Sire Gauvain et le Chevalier Vert	Bertilak / Le Chevalier Vert	Short film
2015	Le Ciel du centaure	Ingeniero	
2015	The Assistant	Thomas Lemans	
2015	Made in France	Sam	
2016	Daguerrotype	Thomas	
2016	Marie Curie: The Courage of Knowledge	André Debierne	
2017	Gauguin - Voyage de Tahiti	Henri Vallin	
2017	Nox	Raphaël Berger	TV mini-series Nominated - ACS Award for Best Actor
2018	Tout ce qu'il me reste de la révolution	Saïd	
2019	Play	Mathias Adler	
2019	Vers la bataille	Louis	
2021	Oxygen	Léo Ferguson	
2022	Qu'est-ce qu'elle a ma famille?	Mathieu	Telefilm
2022	Sons of Ramses	Michaël	
2023	Disparition inquiétante	Ludovic Minghetti	TV mini-series
2026	Child	Greg	Feature film

== Other awards ==
- 2001: Berlin International Film Festival - Shooting Stars Award
