= Milo Machado-Graner =

French actor

- Born: 31 August 2008 (age 17)
- Occupation: Actor
- Years active: 2021–present
- Known for: Anatomy of a Fall

Milo Machado-Graner (born 31 August 2008) is a French actor known for his role in the film Anatomy of a Fall (2023), which garnered him numerous accolades, including nominations for the Critics Choice, Lumière and César awards.

== Early life ==
Machado-Graner has a brother, Solan, with whom he co-starred in Waiting for Bojangles (2021). Their mother is a Parisian visual artist originally from Famalicão, Portugal.

== Career ==
In 2021, Machado-Graner made his acting debut in the first season of the Arte series In Therapy, portraying the son of the psychiatrist and psychoanalyst played by Frédéric Pierrot.

In 2023, he starred as Daniel, the visually impaired son of Sandra, in Justine Triet's courtroom drama Anatomy of a Fall, which won the Palme d'Or at Cannes. Initially seeking blind and visually impaired actors for the role, Triet eventually opened casting to include sighted children. She aimed to cast a blond-haired actor to complement the leading actress Sandra Hüller, who portrays Daniel's mother. However, upon listening to Machado-Graner's audition tape, she invited him for a callback audition in November 2021. Impressed by his emotional transformation and maturity, Triet promptly selected him for the role, likening his audition to Henry Thomas's for E.T. the Extra-Terrestrial (1982). Anthony Lane of The New Yorker wrote that Machado-Graner played the role "with a fine blend of frailty and determination," while Dana Stevens of Slate named him as the best juvenile performer of the year. In November 2023, he was named to Révélations, the shortlist for Best Male Revelation at the César Awards. He also received a nomination for Best Young Actor/Actress at the 29th Critics' Choice Awards. On 24 January 2024, Machado-Graner was nominated for Best Male Revelation at the 49th César Awards.

In 2024, Machado-Graner starred in Arnaud Desplechin's docufiction film Filmlovers!, which celebrates movie theaters.

== Filmography ==
=== Film ===
Year	Title	Role	Notes
2021	Waiting for Bojangles	Alexandre	
2021	Stuck Together	Basile Boghassian	
2023	Anatomy of a Fall	Daniel Maleski	
2024	Filmlovers!	Paul Dédalus	
2024	Le Choix	Lucas (voice)	
2025	Mercato	Abel Berzane	
2025	Once Upon My Mother	Jacques Perez (ages 12–17)	

=== Television ===
Year	Title	Role	Notes
2021	In Therapy	Adam Dayan	3 episodes
2022	Alex Hugo	Tristan Melino	Episodes: "Mauvais sang"
2022	Heureusement qu'on s'a	Léo	TV movie

== Accolades ==
Award	Date of ceremony	Category	Film	Result	Ref.
Capucines du cinéma français	15 December 2023	Best Supporting Actor	Anatomy of a Fall	Won	
César Awards	23 February 2024	Best Male Revelation	Anatomy of a Fall	Nominated	
Chicago Film Critics Association	12 December 2023	Most Promising Performer	Anatomy of a Fall	Nominated	
Critics' Choice Movie Awards	14 January 2024	Best Young Actor/Actress	Anatomy of a Fall	Nominated	
Dublin Film Critics' Circle	18 December 2023	Best Actor	Anatomy of a Fall	8th place	
International Cinephile Society	11 February 2024	Best Supporting Actor	Anatomy of a Fall	Nominated	
International Cinephile Society	11 February 2024	Best Breakthrough Performance	Anatomy of a Fall	Runner-up	
Lumière Awards	22 January 2024	Best Male Revelation	Anatomy of a Fall	Nominated	
Music City Film Critics Association	15 January 2024	Best Young Actor	Anatomy of a Fall	Nominated	
North Carolina Film Critics Association	3 January 2024	Best Breakthrough Performance	Anatomy of a Fall	Nominated	
Paris Film Critics Association	4 February 2024	Best Male Revelation	Anatomy of a Fall	Nominated	
San Diego Film Critics Society	19 December 2023	Best Youth Performance	Anatomy of a Fall	Runner-up	
Seattle Film Critics Society	8 January 2024	Best Youth Performance	Anatomy of a Fall	Won	
Washington D.C. Area Film Critics Association	9 December 2023	Best Youth Performance	Anatomy of a Fall	Nominated	
