= Playing 'In the Company of Men' =

2003 film

- Film poster
- Directed by: Arnaud Desplechin
- Written by: Edward Bond; Emmanuel Bourdieu; Arnaud Desplechin; Nicolas Saada
- Produced by: Gaëlle Bayssière; Arnaud Desplechin
- Starring: Sami Bouajila
- Cinematography: Stéphane Fontaine
- Edited by: Laurence Briaud
- Music by: Krishna Levy; Paul Weller
- Production companies: Capa Drama; Why Not Productions; Arte France Cinéma
- Distributed by: BAC Films
- Release date: 15 May 2003
- Running time: 121 minutes
- Country: France
- Language: French

Playing 'In the Company of Men' (French: En jouant 'Dans la compagnie des hommes' or French: Léo, en jouant 'Dans la compagnie des hommes') is a 2003 French drama film directed by Arnaud Desplechin. It was screened in the Un Certain Regard section at the 2003 Cannes Film Festival.

== Cast ==
- Sami Bouajila as Léonard
- Jean-Paul Roussillon as Henri Jurrieu
- Wladimir Yordanoff as Hammer
- László Szabó as Claude Doniol
- Anna Mouglalis as Ophélie
- Bakary Sangaré as Jonas Servun
- Hippolyte Girardot as Willian De Lille
- Anne Consigny as Therese Jurrieu
- Xavier Beja as Laerte
