= My Golden Days =

- Theatrical release poster
- French: Trois souvenirs de ma jeunesse
- Directed by: Arnaud Desplechin
- Written by: Arnaud Desplechin; Julie Peyr
- Produced by: Oury Milshtein; Tatiana Bouchain
- Starring: Quentin Dolmaire; Lou Roy-Lecollinet; Mathieu Amalric; Olivier Rabourdin; Françoise Lebrun; Elyot Milshtein; Lily Taieb; Raphaël Cohen; Pierre Andrau; Théo Fernandez; Clémence Le Gall
- Cinematography: Irina Lubtchansky
- Edited by: Laurence Briaud
- Music by: Grégoire Hetzel
- Production companies: Why Not Productions; France 2 Cinéma
- Distributed by: Le Pacte
- Release dates: 15 May 2015 (Cannes); 20 May 2015 (France)
- Running time: 120 minutes
- Country: France
- Language: French
- Budget: $4.2 million
- Box office: $1.5 million

My Golden Days (French: Trois souvenirs de ma jeunesse, lit. 'Three Memories of my Youth'), also titled My Golden Years, is a 2015 French drama film directed by Arnaud Desplechin. It stars Quentin Dolmaire, Lou Roy-Lecollinet, and Mathieu Amalric. It features the character of Paul Dédalus, who appeared in Desplechin's earlier films My Sex Life... or How I Got into an Argument (1996) and A Christmas Tale (2008), and would go on to appear in Filmlovers! (2024). It was screened as part of the Directors' Fortnight section of the 2015 Cannes Film Festival, where it won the SACD Prize.

== Plot ==
Due to a passport problem, an anthropologist Paul is stopped and interrogated at the airport in Paris. He recalls the memories of his youth.

Told in three segments: (1: “Childhood”) Paul argues with his mother and goes and stays with an aunt. His mother dies and his angry father attacks him. (2: “Russia”) Paul is questioned about a passport irregularity. He explains that he went on a school trip to Russia. His Jewish friend agreed to act as a courier, handing over money and books. Paul gave up his passport (3: “Esther”) Paul falls in love with his sister’s friend Esther, beautiful, promiscuous, and unhappy. They meet at parties and begin a long-term relationship, though each has other lovers. Paul studies in Paris but returns home when he can. His tutor dies and he works on a research project in Tajikistan. (“Epilogue”) Paul bumps into Jean-Paul and his wife. Paul says Jean-Paul betrayed him while he was away.

== Cast ==
- Quentin Dolmaire as Paul Dédalus
- Lou Roy-Lecollinet as Esther
- Mathieu Amalric as Paul (adult)
- Dinara Droukarova as Irina
- Pierre-Benoist Varoclier as Yorick
- Françoise Lebrun as Rose
- Irina Vavilova as Mme Sidorov
- Olivier Rabourdin as Abel Dédalus
- Anne Benoît as Louise
- Elyot Milshtein as Marc Zylberberg
- Pierre Andrau as Kovalki
- Lily Taieb as Delphine Dédalus
- Raphaël Cohen as Ivan Dédalus
- Clémence Le Gall as Pénélope
- Théo Fernandez as Bob
- Yassine Douighi as Medhi
- Ève Doé-Bruce as Professor Béhanzin
- Mélodie Richard as Gilberte
- Pierre-Benoist Varoclier as Yorick
- Éric Ruf as Kovalki (adult)
- Patrick d'Assumçao as The monk

== Release ==
The film had its world premiere in the Directors' Fortnight section at the 2015 Cannes Film Festival on 15 May 2015. It was released in France on 20 May 2015.

== Reception ==
=== Critical reception ===
On review aggregator website Rotten Tomatoes, the film holds an approval rating of 88% based on 69 reviews, with an average rating of 7.5/10. The website's critical consensus reads, "My Golden Years is a complex, well-acted coming-of-age drama." On Metacritic, the film has a weighted average score of 87 out of 100, based on 24 critics, indicating "universal acclaim".

=== Accolades ===
Award	Year of ceremony	Category	Recipient(s)	Result	Ref(s)
Cabourg Film Festival	2015	Best Director	Arnaud Desplechin	Won	
Cannes Film Festival	2015	SACD Prize	My Golden Days	Won	
César Award	2016	Best Film	My Golden Days	Nominated	
César Award	2016	Best Director	Arnaud Desplechin	Won	
César Award	2016	Most Promising Actor	Quentin Dolmaire	Nominated	
César Award	2016	Most Promising Actress	Lou Roy-Lecollinet	Nominated	
César Award	2016	Best Original Screenplay	Arnaud Desplechin and Julie Peyr	Nominated	
César Award	2016	Best Cinematography	Irina Lubtchansky	Nominated	
César Award	2016	Best Editing	Laurence Briaud	Nominated	
César Award	2016	Best Original Music	Grégoire Hetzel	Nominated	
César Award	2016	Best Sound	Nicolas Cantin, Sylvain Malbrant, and Stéphane Thiébaut	Nominated	
César Award	2016	Best Costume Design	Nathalie Raoul	Nominated	
César Award	2016	Best Production Design	Toma Baquéni	Nominated	
Chicago International Film Festival	2015	Best Art Direction	Toma Baqueni	Won	
Louis Delluc Prize	2015	Best Film	My Golden Days	Nominated	
Lumière Awards	2016	Best Film	My Golden Days	Nominated	
Lumière Awards	2016	Best Director	Arnaud Desplechin	Won	
Lumière Awards	2016	Best Male Revelation	Quentin Dolmaire	Nominated	
Lumière Awards	2016	Best Female Revelation	Lou Roy-Lecollinet	Nominated	
Lumière Awards	2016	Best Screenplay	Arnaud Desplechin and Julie Peyr	Nominated	
Lumière Awards	2016	Best Cinematography	Irina Lubtchansky	Nominated	
Lumière Awards	2016	Best Music	Grégoire Hetzel	Won	
Prix Jacques Prévert du Scénario	2016	Best Original Screenplay	Arnaud Desplechin and Julie Peyr	Won	
