= I Got Life! =

- Poster
- Original title: Aurore
- Directed by: Blandine Lenoir
- Written by: Jean-Luc Gaget; Blandine Lenoir
- Produced by: Antoine Rein; Fabrice Goldstein
- Starring: Agnès Jaoui
- Cinematography: Pierre Milon
- Edited by: Stéphanie Araud
- Music by: Bertrand Belin
- Production company: Karé Productions
- Distributed by: Diaphana Films
- Release date: April 26, 2017
- Running time: 99 min
- Country: France
- Language: French
- Budget: $3.5 million
- Box office: $4.9 million

I Got Life! (French: Aurore) is a 2017 French drama film directed by Blandine Lenoir.

== Plot ==
Aurore is fifty years old, separated from her husband, Nanar, and with two grown up daughters. The restaurant she works at is under new management from an insufferable boss, and she is suffering with symptoms of the menopause. While pretending to view an apartment that her friend Marie-Noelle (known as Mano) is selling, she reencounters an old flame and her former husband’s best friend, Christophe, with whom she reconnects.

Her eldest daughter, Marina, tells her that she is pregnant. Aurore at first is worried that Marina is making a similar mistake to her in having a baby so young, which upsets Marina. Aurore arranges for Marina to have her initial scans at the hospital where Christophe works in order to see him again, although this leads to a further argument and reconciliation. Christophe and Aurore meet for a few dates. Infuriated by the changes to the restaurant, Aurore quits her job as a waitress.

Aurore’s younger daughter, Lucie, announces that she is leaving for Barcelona with her boyfriend, who is moving there for work. Nanar tells Aurore that he wants a divorce so he can marry his new partner, with whom he now has two young daughters. Aurore stops seeing Christophe, and starts seeing Hervé, whom she met at a party hosted by Mano. After some time at the job centre, Aurore finds a job as a cleaner for a group of four retired women.

At a high school reunion, an old classmate assumes that Aurore and Christophe are a long-term couple, and cannot believe that Aurore instead married Nanar. Marina comes to stay with Aurore, and Lucie returns from Barcelona after breaking up with her boyfriend.

Hervé invites Aurore for a romantic getaway to Venice, but she is hesitant to accept, holding on to her feelings for Christophe. Just as she is driving away, she spots Christophe heading towards her house, getting out of the car. They reunite, and Marina gives birth to Aurore’s first grandchild.

== Cast ==
- Agnès Jaoui: Aurore Tabort
- Thibault de Montalembert: Christophe Tochard
- Pascale Arbillot: Mano
- Sarah Suco: Marina Tabort
- Lou Roy-Lecollinet: Lucie Tabort
- Philippe Rebbot: Nanar
- Samir Guesmi: The trainer
- Laure Calamy: The Pôle Emploi employee
