= Poison Friends =

- Directed by: Emmanuel Bourdieu
- Starring: Malik Zidi; Thibault Vinçon
- Release date: 18 May 2006 (CFF)
- Running time: 1h 40min
- Country: France
- Language: French
- Box office: $316.184

Poison Friends (French: Les Amitiés maléfiques) is a 2006 French drama film directed by Emmanuel Bourdieu.

== Cast ==
- Malik Zidi - Eloi Duhaut
- Thibault Vinçon - André Morney
- Alexandre Steiger - Alexandre Pariente
- Thomas Blanchard - Edouard Franchon
- Dominique Blanc - Florence Duhaut
- Natacha Régnier - Marguerite
- Jacques Bonnaffé - Professor Mortier
- Geneviève Mnich - The editor
