= Place Vendôme (film) =

- Film poster
- Directed by: Nicole Garcia
- Written by: Jacques Fieschi; Nicole Garcia
- Produced by: Alain Sarde
- Starring: Catherine Deneuve; Jean-Pierre Bacri; Emmanuelle Seigner; Jacques Dutronc
- Cinematography: Laurent Dailland
- Edited by: Luc Barnier; Françoise Bonnot
- Music by: Richard Robbins
- Distributed by: AMLF
- Release dates: September 1998 (Venice); 7 October 1998 (France)
- Running time: 117 minutes
- Country: France
- Language: French
- Budget: $11 million
- Box office: $7.5 million

Place Vendôme is a 1998 French crime drama film directed by Nicole Garcia, starring Catherine Deneuve, and named after the Place Vendôme in Paris.

Deneuve won the Volpi Cup for Best Actress at the 55th Venice International Film Festival for her role in the film.

== Plot ==
Vincent Malivert is the head of a prestigious jewel broker's firm on the exclusive Place Vendôme. Hampered by debt and implicated in trafficking of stolen jewels, he commits suicide, leaving his wife Marianne to pick up the pieces.

Marianne, who has spent the last few years in and out of a clinic recovering from alcoholism, discovers a set of perfect cut diamonds in her husband's safe. Although she knows the diamonds are probably stolen, she decides to use this opportunity to rebuild her life and sets about trying to find a buyer for the hidden jewels. Unwittingly, she is drawn to a shady dealer named Battistelli, the very man who drove her into a disastrous and loveless marriage.

== Cast ==
- Catherine Deneuve as Marianne Malivert
- Jean-Pierre Bacri as Jean-Pierre
- Emmanuelle Seigner as Nathalie
- Jacques Dutronc as Serge Battistelli
- Bernard Fresson as Vincent Malivert
- François Berléand as Eric Malivert
- Dragan Nikolić as Janos
- Larry Lamb as Christopher Makos
- Otto Tausig as Samy
- László Szabó as Charlie Rosen
- Elisabeth Commelin as Mademoiselle Pierson
- Philippe Clévenot as Kleiser
- Malik Zidi as Sam's Son
- Éric Ruf as Phillipe Ternece
- Nidal Al-Askhar as Saliha
- Julian Fellowes as Wajman
- Michael Culkin as De Beers Man

== Production ==
Principal photography began on 23 June 1997 and completed on 26 September 1997.

== Reception and critical response ==
On review aggregator Rotten Tomatoes, Place Vendôme holds an approval rating of 85%, based on 20 reviews, and an average rating of 6.6/10. On Metacritic, the film has a weighted average score of 74 out of 100, based on 18 critics, indicating "Generally favorable reviews".

In the New York Times, David Kehr wrote, "despite its many flaws, the film never loses its focus on its fascinating central figure. Grandly suffering, grandly triumphant or just plain grand, Ms. Deneuve is a spectacle to behold." Lisa Nesselson of the Variety Magazine said that the film is "an elaborate and elegant suspenser that gives Catherine Deneuve plenty of leeway to act up a storm, "Place Vendome" features coveted gemstones, the no-nonsense factions that want them and a woman's revised take on her own destiny, played out against luxurious backdrops".

Roger Ebert gave the film a score of 3.5 out of 4.
