= Changing Times (film) =

Changing Times (Les Temps qui changent)
- Theatrical release poster
- Directed by: André Téchiné
- Written by: André Téchiné; Laurent Guyot; Pascal Bonitzer
- Produced by: Paulo Branco
- Starring: Catherine Deneuve; Gérard Depardieu
- Cinematography: Julien Hirsch
- Edited by: Martine Giordano
- Music by: Juliette Garrigues
- Distributed by: Gemini Films
- Release date: 8 December 2004
- Running time: 100 minutes
- Country: France
- Languages: French; Arabic
- Budget: €5.3 million
- Box office: €4.1 million

Changing Times (original title: Les Temps qui changent) is a 2004 French drama film directed by André Téchiné, starring Catherine Deneuve and Gérard Depardieu. The film follows a construction engineer who goes to Morocco to oversee a new project and catch up with the woman he loved 30 years ago.

== Plot ==
Antoine, a successful French civil engineer, travels to Tangiers to supervise the construction of buildings for a large media center. His real motivation, however, is to seek out his first love from thirty years before, Cécile. Having discovered that Cécile lives in Tangiers, he begins anonymously sending her roses every day at the radio station where she hosts a French-Arabic program, but she is uninterested in her secret admirer. Cécile, who married a man shortly after ending her relationship with Antoine, only to divorce later, is currently married to a younger man, Nathan, a Moroccan Jewish physician.

Antoine has literally counted the days (31 years, 8 months, and 20 days) since he last saw Cécile and has spent years tracking her down. He has come to Morocco expressly to make her fall back in love with him. He has never married and in his obsession to win Cécile's heart he recruits the help of Nabila, his Moroccan assistant, to investigate the possibility of using witchcraft. Antoine and Cécile eventually cross paths in a supermarket when Antoine walks into a plate glass window, injuring his nose, and Nathan, who is with Cécile, rushes over to administer first aid.

Around the time Antoine arrives in Tangier, Cécile and Nathan's son, Sami, who lives in Paris, arrives for a visit with his live-in girlfriend, Nadia, and Saïd, her 9-year-old son by another man. Sami often leaves them alone in order to visit with his Moroccan boyfriend Bilal, who briefly lived in Paris and is now looking after a villa for its absent owners. Bilal more or less accepts Sami's ambivalence and they restart their affair. Nadia, meanwhile, hopes to reconnect with her identical twin sister, Aïcha, a conservative observant Muslim who works in a McDonald's, but Aicha is reluctant to see her and after many efforts Nadia manages only a brief glimpse at her sister from afar. When Nadia's addiction to prescriptions pills is exposed by Nathan, Sami decides that is time to return to Paris.

Cécile, who is cold and formal, has buried her youthful dreams, coping with life in a state of mild exasperation. Her marriage is less than blissful. Nathan, whose career has stalled, has had several affairs. Eventually Cécile, encouraged by Rachel, a friend and coworker, accepts Antoine's advances, initially proposing a brief fling, rather than his preference for them to grow old together. They make love and Antoine is closer to reaching his goal just when he was losing all hope. However, shortly thereafter, Antoine is involved in a serious accident, trapped in a collapse at the construction site where he works and is hospitalized with a coma. Cécile visits him constantly at the hospital.

Cécile and Nathan separate. He moves to Casablanca accepting a new job. It is suggested that he has started a relationship with Aïcha. Bilal is ambivalent about accepting Samis's offer to visit him in Paris. Months later during one of Cécile's hospital visits, Antoine wakes up from his coma, and their hands join.

== Cast ==
- Catherine Deneuve as Cécile
- Gérard Depardieu as Antoine Lavau
- Gilbert Melki as Nathan
- Malik Zidi as Sami
- Lubna Azabal as Nadia/Aïcha
- Nadem Rachati as Bilal
- Tanya Lopert as Rachel
- Nabila Baraka as Nabila
- Idir Elomri as Saïd

== Release ==
Though the film's initial release was in December 2004, its regular release in the United States was not until mid-July 2006, when it opened at the Paris Theatre in Manhattan. The film was released on DVD in the United States on 3 October 2006.

== Reception ==
The film garnered a favorable critical reaction, holding a fresh rating of 63% on Rotten Tomatoes based on 41 reviews. Metacritic gave the film an average score of 64/100, indicating "generally favorable reviews".

The reviewer for the Minneapolis Star Tribune commented that: " The movie is not quite in the league of his 1995 masterpiece, Wild Reeds. But it still serves as another gorgeous and immensely satisfying reminder that there are few better directors than Téchiné when it comes to capturing the vagaries of the heart. The script, which the director helped write, is over determined. But the casting is inspired. In many ways, the story is about the spells we allow ourselves to fall under, preventing us from seeing life as it is.

Andrew Sarris from The New York Observer called it "an interesting film experience, as much because of its chaotic narrative as in spite of it. In Variety Lisa Nesselson said that "this moody, more-bitter-than-sweet ode to anxiety is intense adult fare reinforced by effective no frills lensing". Writing in Newsday, film critic John Anderson lauded the director. " Techiné always locates a steadfast emotional element in the worlds he creates, a defiant human construct against unstoppable change. In Changing Times, it is love, in unfamiliar forms".

Stephen Holden in The New York Times wrote "In Changing Times, Mr. Téchiné, the great French director, is near the peak of his form. Weaving a half dozen subplots, he creates a set of variations on the theme of divided sensibilities tugging one another into states of perpetual unrest and possible happiness. Much of the movie's charm lies in its sheer vitality. Mr. Téchiné loves people and life, and every scene is filled with light, music, activity and a sensuous appreciation of landscape. The characters are continually on the move. That's one reason Mr. Téchiné's films feel so buoyant: no one is weighed down by too much psychological baggage. He accepts that human behavior is mysterious and unpredictable. Even his unhappiest characters are players in a larger vision of a multicultural world in continual flux. The impulse to connect across cultures is a fundamental urge that's worth the pain and uncertainty; it offers the same rewards as learning a new language".

Praising the cast, Jonathan Rosenbaum in the Chicago Reader commented that "volatile and sometimes daring performances by Catherine Deneuve, Gérard Depardieu, Gilbert Melki, Malik Zidi, and Lubna Azabal (as twins) contribute to the highly charged and novelistic experience". In a disagreeing note, Lisa Schwarzbaum, writing for Entertainment Weekly, found the film "strangely inert".

== Accolades ==
- Berlin Film Festival (Germany)
  - Nominated: Golden Berlin Bear (André Téchiné)
- César Awards (France)
  - Nominated: Most Promising Actor (Malik Zidi)
- Satellite Awards (USA)
  - Nominated: Best Motion Picture – Foreign Language
  - Nominated: Best Overall DVD
  - Nominated: Best Screenplay – Original (Pascal Bonitzer, Laurent Guyot and André Téchiné)

== Bibliography ==
- Marshall, Bill, André Téchiné, Manchester University Press, 2007, ISBN 0-7190-5831-7
