= Filmlovers! =

2024 film by Arnaud Desplechin

- Theatrical release poster
- French: Spectateurs !
- Directed by: Arnaud Desplechin
- Written by: Arnaud Desplechin
- Produced by: Charles Gillibert
- Narrated by: Arnaud Desplechin; Mathieu Amalric
- Cinematography: Noé Bach
- Edited by: Laurence Briaud
- Music by: Grégoire Hetzel
- Production companies: CG Cinéma; Scala Films; Arte France Cinéma; Hill Valley
- Distributed by: Les Films du Losange
- Release dates: 22 May 2024 (Cannes); 15 January 2025 (France)
- Running time: 88 minutes
- Country: France
- Language: French

Filmlovers! (French: Spectateurs !) is a 2024 docufiction drama film written and directed by Arnaud Desplechin. It stars Milo Machado-Graner, Mathieu Amalric and Françoise Lebrun. It features the character of Paul Dédalus, who appeared in Desplechin's earlier films My Sex Life... or How I Got into an Argument (1996), A Christmas Tale (2008) and My Golden Days (2015). According to Desplechin the film is meant to "celebrate movie theaters and their manifold magic".

It had its world premiere in the Special Screenings section at the 77th Cannes Film Festival on 22 May 2024, where competed for the L'Œil d'or.

== Plot ==
A film lover celebrates the magic of cinema. Memories, fiction and discoveries intertwine in a rapid flow of cinematic images.

== Cast ==
- Louis Birman as 6-year-old Paul
- Dominique Païni as The painter
- Clément Hervieu-Léger as Barthes reader
- Françoise Lebrun The grandmother
- Sandra Laugier as The philosopher
- Olga Milshtein as Philosophy student
- Milo Machado-Graner as 14-year-old Paul
- Margaux Mussano
- Sam Chemoul as 22-year-old Paul
- Marilou Poujardieu as Valérie
- Salomé Rose Stein as Sylvia
- Micha Lescot as Professor Censier
- Soshana Felman as The philosopher
- Kent Jones as The American friend
- Salif Cissé as 30-year-old
- Mathieu Amalric as The filmmaker

== Production ==
Filmlovers! is Arnaud Desplechin's fifteenth feature film and is an essay film in homage to cinema. It features the character of Paul Dédalus, who is considered Desplechin's alter-ego and who first appeared in his film My Sex Life... or How I Got into an Argument (1996) and its prequels A Christmas Tale (2008) and My Golden Days (2015). In Filmlovers!, he returns to the character's childhood, and tells the story of how he got introduced to cinema: first as a spectator, then as a cinephile, and finally a filmmaker. The film is a hybrid of documentary and fiction that incorporates archival footage of film clips and stills as well as interviews with those who accompanied Desplechin in his experiences as a spectator. Ranging from Hollywood blockbusters to Italian neorealism, from the silent era to contemporary cinema, the film is a journey through the images that shaped Desplechin's filmmaking. Desplechin wrote the film's screenplay, in collaboration with Fanny Burdino. He also cited Steven Spielberg's semi-autobiographical film The Fabelmans (2022) as a source of inspiration. The film was produced by Charles Gillibert at CG Cinéma. It was co-produced by Scala Films, Arte France Cinéma and Hill Valley, with the participation of French fashion house Chanel.

Principal photography began on 17 July 2023 in Avion, Pas-de-Calais, where shooting took place for two days at the cinema Le Familia, which was transformed to resemble the 1960s and 1970s. Filming continued that same week in Roubaix and Tourcoing. Desplechin planned to shoot sequences in his former high school, in which a multimedia room bears his name. Filming then moved to Paris.

== Release ==
The film was selected to be screened in the Special Screenings section at the 77th Cannes Film Festival, where it had its world premiere on 22 May 2024.

International sales are handled by Les Films du Losange, who also distributed the film in France on 15 January 2025.

== Reception ==
=== Critical response ===
On the review aggregator website Rotten Tomatoes, 100% of 10 critics' reviews are positive. Metacritic, which uses a weighted average, assigned the film a score of 78 out of 100, based on 5 critics, indicating "generally favorable" reviews.

=== Accolades ===
Award	Date of ceremony	Category	Recipient(s)	Result	Ref.
Cannes Film Festival	24 May 2024	L'Œil d'or	Arnaud Desplechin	Nominated	

== List of mentioned films ==
The film makes reference to several other films, including:

- A Touch of Zen (1971) by King Hu
- Aliens (1986) by James Cameron
- Bathing in a Stream (1897) by Alice Guy
- Bram Stoker's Dracula (1992) by Francis Ford Coppola
- Broken Arrow (1996) by John Woo
- Champs Elysées (1896) by Auguste and Louis Lumière
- Cheyenne Autumn (1964) by John Ford
- Chimes at Midnight (1965) by Orson Welles
- Cliffhanger (1993) by Renny Harlin
- Come Drink with Me (1966) by King Hu
- Coming Home (2014) by Zhang Yimou
- Cries and Whispers (1972) by Ingmar Bergman
- Daisies (1966) by Vera Chytilova
- Day of Wrath (1943) by Carl Theodor Dreyer
- Die Hard (1988) by John McTiernan
- Europe '51 (1952) by Roberto Rossellini
- Fantomas (1964) by André Hunebelle
- From the Branches Drops the Withered Blossom (1960) by Paul Meyer
- Frozen River (2008) by Courtney Hunt
- Iola's Promise (1912) by D. W. Griffith
- It Happened One Night (1934) by Frank Capra
- Journey into Light (1951) by Stuart Heisler
- Killer of Sheep (1977) by Charles Burnett
- King Kong (1976) by John Guillermin
- Man with a Movie Camera (1929) by Dziga Vertov
- Minority Report (2002) by Steven Spielberg
- Mouchette (1967) by Robert Bresson
- Napoléon (1927) by Abel Gance
- North by Northwest (1959) by Alfred Hitchcock
- Notting Hill (1999) by Roger Michell
- Only Angels Have Wings (1939) by Howard Hawks
- Passage Through a Tunnel By Rail (1898) by Auguste and Louis Lumière
- Peggy Sue Got Married (1986) by Francis Ford Coppola
- Persona (1966) by Ingmar Bergman
- Point Break (1991) by Kathryn Bigelow
- Ran (1985) by Akira Kurosawa
- Safety Last! (1923) by Fred C. Newmeyer
- Samba Traoré (1992) by Idrissa Ouedraogo
- Shoah (1985) by Claude Lanzmann
- Spellbound (1945) by Alfred Hitchcock
- Sullivan's Travels (1941) by Preston Sturges
- Terminator 2: Judgment Day (1991) by James Cameron
- The 400 Blows (1959) by François Truffaut
- The Age of Innocence (1993) by Martin Scorsese
- The Arrival of a Train at La Ciotat (1896) by Auguste and Louis Lumière
- The Battle of the Rails (1946) by René Clément
- The Cotton Club (1984) by Francis Ford Coppola
- The Deer Hunter (1978) by Michael Cimino
- The Exiles (1961) by Kent Mackenzie
- The Little Soldier (1963) by Jean-Luc Godard
- The River (1951) by Jean Renoir
- The Terrible Children (1950) by Jean-Pierre Melville
- The Tiger of Eschnapur (1959) by Fritz Lang
