= The New Eve =

1924 painting by Sándor Bortnyik

Coordinates: 47.4911°N 19.0628°E

- Az új Éva (Hungarian)
- Artist: Sándor Bortnyik
- Year: 1924
- Medium: oil on canvas
- Dimensions: 48,5 cm × 38 cm (191 in × 15 in)
- Location: Hungarian National Museum; Budapest

The New Eve (Hungarian: Az új Éva) is a painting by Hungarian artist Sándor Bortnyik from 1924.

== Description ==
The picture is painted in oil on canvas with the dimensions of 48.5 x 38.0 cm; it is part of the collection of the Hungarian National Museum in Budapest, Hungary.

== Analysis ==
In 1919, exiled from his native Hungary, Sandor Bortnik falls in with representatives of Constructivism, most particularly from 1922 to 1924, when he lived in Weimar, Germany and met artists from the Bauhaus movement. In keeping with this aesthetic Bortnik painted abstract two- and three-dimensional compositions to which he subsequently added representational figures and objects.

"New Eve" describes an ironic ideal of a modern 1920s woman. A model in a fashionable skirt (but no blouse, her torso being a beige cylinder with abstract breasts (and her head a featureless oval)) holds in her left hand the green Apple of Sin, and in her right a clutch or checkbook. Behind her on the levitating ocher platform is a black dress form, and in the far background a bifurcated modern skyscraper. In the immediate foreground are two mannequin in a boxing pose whose hands, unlike the female model's, are spheres.

Over all the painting manages to deride utopian ideals, but cannot eschew them inasmuch as it itself is an artifact shaping the "new world".
