= Notes on a Scandal (soundtrack) =

Film score by Philip Glass
- Released: January 9, 2007
- Studio: AIR Studios, London
- Genre: Film score
- Length: 50:09
- Label: Rounder

Notes on a Scandal is the soundtrack of the 2006 film, composed by Philip Glass. It was released by Rounder Records on January 9, 2007.

The album was nominated for the Academy Award for Best Original Score.

== Track listing ==
Music composed by Philip Glass

1. "First Day of School" – 2:42
2. "The History" – 2:53
3. "Invitation" – 1:29
4. "The Harts" – 2:16
5. "Discovery" – 3:01
6. "Confession" – 1:45
7. "Stalking" – 1:53
8. "Courage" – 2:17
9. "Sheba & Steven" – 1:23
10. "The Promise" – 2:54
11. "Good Girl" – 3:00
12. "Sheba's Longing" – 2:32
13. "Someone in Your Garden" – 1:51
14. "A Life Lived Together" – 3:02
15. "Someone Has Died" – 2:01
16. "Betrayal" – 3:43
17. "It's Your Choice" – 2:39
18. "Barbara's House" – 3:45
19. "Going Home" – 2:11
20. "I Knew Her" – 3:22

== Personnel ==
- Michael Riesman - conductor
- Nico Muhly - assistant conductor

"Special thanks to Jim Keller, Kurt Munkacsi, Zoe Knight."
