= My Sex Life... or How I Got into an Argument =

1996 film

- Film poster
- Directed by: Arnaud Desplechin
- Written by: Arnaud Desplechin; Emmanuel Bourdieu
- Produced by: Pascal Caucheteux
- Starring: Mathieu Amalric
- Cinematography: Stéphane Fontaine; Eric Gautier; Dominique Perrier-Royer
- Edited by: Eszter Majoros
- Music by: Krishna Levy
- Production companies: Why Not Productions; La Sept Cinéma; France 2 Cinéma
- Distributed by: BAC Films
- Release date: May 1996
- Running time: 178 minutes
- Country: France
- Language: French
- Budget: $4 million
- Box office: $1.9 million

My Sex Life... or How I Got into an Argument (French: Comment je me suis disputé... (ma vie sexuelle)) is a 1996 French drama film directed by Arnaud Desplechin. It competed for the Palme d'Or at the 1996 Cannes Film Festival. It won the César Award for Most Promising Actor (Mathieu Amalric) and was also nominated for Most Promising Actress (Emmanuelle Devos and Jeanne Balibar). The film ensured Desplechin's and Amalric's career launches in the 90s as respected director and actor respectively (although they had both initially worked towards the reverse). Historically, it also marks one of Marion Cotillard's very first roles in the industry.

My Sex Life... follows the story of a PhD student and lecturer in philosophy, Paul Dédalus, as he struggles to break up with his longtime girlfriend, has conflicted feelings about his two mistresses – who are also his friends' partners –, and has a difficult time facing a new colleague, appointed head of the "epistemology department", a former friend who dislikes him for reasons Paul cannot remember. The Catholic conversion and religious concerns of Paul's younger brother, Ivan, are a subplot in the movie.

Being nearly three hours long, the movie's representation of a daily life in Paris follows a similar pattern to Jean Eustache's The Mother and the Whore from 1973, a cult post-French New Wave film lasting three hours and forty minutes. Similar dialogues and epigrammatic lines or quotations on life, love and friendship are found in both works. Maurice Pialat's interest for "realistic" circumstances has been cited by Desplechin as a major influence on his work in general.

Other versions of the Paul Dédalus character appear in A Christmas Tale (2008), My Golden Days (2015) and Filmlovers! (2024). These later productions also feature Amalric.

== Cast ==
- Mathieu Amalric as Paul Dedalus
- Emmanuelle Devos as Esther
- Marianne Denicourt as Sylvia
- Emmanuel Salinger as Nathan
- Thibault de Montalembert as Bob
- Chiara Mastroianni as Patricia
- Denis Podalydès as Jean-Jacques
- Jeanne Balibar as Valérie
- Fabrice Desplechin as Ivan
- Hélène Lapiower as Le Mérou
- Michel Vuillermoz as Frédéric Rabier
- Roland Amstutz as Chernov
- Marion Cotillard as Student
