= Arnaud Desplechin =

French film director and screenwriter

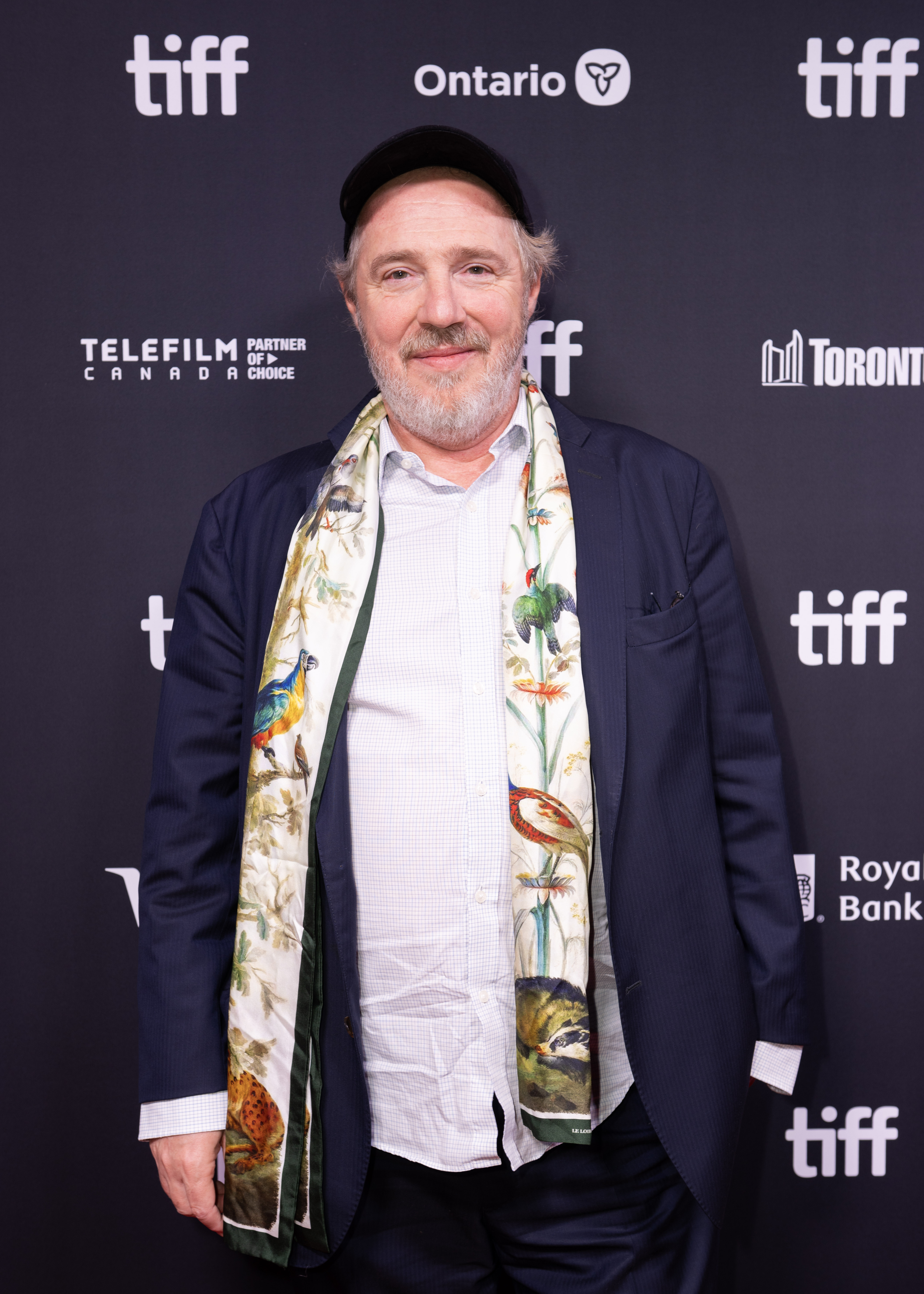
- Desplechin in 2025
- Born: 31 October 1960 (age 65); Roubaix, France
- Occupations: Film director, screenwriter, cinematographer, producer
- Years active: 1984–present
- Spouse: Florence Seyvos

Arnaud Desplechin (French: [aʁno depləʃɛ̃]; born 31 October 1960) is a French filmmaker. His films usually explore contemporary French society, featuring melodramatic settings or heavily inspired by François Truffaut.

He is most known for Esther Kahn (2000), Kings and Queen (2004), A Christmas Tale (2008) and My Golden Days (2015), for the latter he won the César Award for Best Director.

== Early life ==
Desplechin was born in Roubaix. He is the son of Robert and Mado Desplechin, and grew up in the Nord department. He has a brother named Fabrice who has acted in several of his films, and two sisters: novelist Marie Desplechin and screenwriter Raphaëlle Desplechin.

Arnaud Desplechin studied film directing at the University of Paris III: Sorbonne Nouvelle then at the IDHEC, graduating in 1984. He made three short films inspired by the work of the Belgian novelist Jean Ray. During the late 1980s, Desplechin worked as a director of photography on several films.

== Career ==
In 1990, Desplechin directed La vie des morts, starring several actors who would go on to appear in multiple Desplechin films, such as Marianne Denicourt, Emmanuelle Devos, Emmanuel Salinger and Thibault de Montalembert. The 54-minute-long film won the Jean Vigo Prize for Short Films, and was shown at the 1990 Cannes Film Festival.

Desplechin's first feature-length movie, The Sentinel, premiered in 1992 at Cannes, starring several actors from La vie des morts as well as Mathieu Amalric, Chiara Mastroianni, and Lászlo Szabó, who have also become frequent Desplechin collaborators. Desplechin's 1996 film My Sex Life... or How I Got Into an Argument was critically successful.

In 2000, Desplechin made his first English-language film, Esther Kahn, adapted from a short story by Arthur Symons, and starred Summer Phoenix in the title role. The film was seen as a homage to François Truffaut's work because it deals with coming of age (a favorite Truffaut theme) and uses the New Wave cinema techniques that Truffaut pioneered.

Three years later, Desplechin made two films adapting Edward Bond's play Playing 'In the Company of Men': one showing 70% rehearsal footage and 30% of the film itself; and the other with inverse proportions. The next year, he directed Kings and Queen, which mixed comedy and tragedy to tell the story of two ex-lovers played by Amalric and Devos. The film also starred Catherine Deneuve in the role of a psychiatrist. Kings and Queen was nominated for several awards and Amalric won the César Award for Best Actor. However, controversy arose when actress Marianne Denicourt, Desplechin's ex-girlfriend, accused him of revealing elements of her private life in the screenplay of Kings and Queen. In 2005, she published Mauvais génie ("Evil Genius"), describing her relationship with an unscrupulous film director called "Arnold Duplancher." In 2006, she unsuccessfully sued Desplechin.

In 2007, Desplechin filmed L'Aimée, a documentary showing his father, his brother, and his nephews in the family house in Roubaix just before it was to be sold. That same year, he filmed the family drama A Christmas Tale, starring Deneuve, Amalric, Devos, and Mastroianni. This film was screened in competition at Cannes in 2008.

His 2013 film Jimmy Picard was nominated for the Palme d'Or at the 2013 Cannes Film Festival, constituting his fifth film selected in the main competition. In 2014, he adapted Alexander Ostrovsky's play The Forest. For the drama film My Golden Days (2015), which he directed and co-wrote, Desplechin won the César and Lumière Award for best director, and the SACD Prize at the 2015 Cannes Film Festival.

In 2016, he was a member of the main competition jury of the 2016 Cannes Film Festival.

In 2019, the film Oh Mercy! was nominated for the Palme d'Or at the 2019 Cannes Film Festival, making it his seventh film selected in the main competition. His 2021 film, Deception, had its world premiere in the Cannes Premiere section of the 2021 Cannes Film Festival. His 2022, Brother and Sister starring Marion Cotillard and Melvil Poupaud, premiered in official competition at the 2022 Cannes Film Festival, marking his eighth entry in the festival's main competition. In 2024, his docudrama Filmlovers! premiered in the Special Screenings section of the 2024 Cannes Film Festival.

In 2025, Desplechin's drama film, Two Pianos, starring François Civil, Nadia Tereszkiewicz and Charlotte Rampling, premiered in the Gala Presentations section of the 2025 Toronto International Film Festival, becoming Desplechin's first film in over 20 years to premiere outside of Cannes.

== Filmography ==
Year	English Title	Original title	Notes
1991	La vie des morts		
1992	The Sentinel	La sentinelle	
1996	My Sex Life... or How I Got into an Argument	Comment je me suis disputé... (ma vie sexuelle)	
2000	Esther Kahn		English-language debut
2003	Playing 'In the Company of Men'	En jouant 'Dans la compagnie des hommes'	
2004	Kings and Queen	Rois et reine	
2008	A Christmas Tale	Un conte de Noël	
2013	Jimmy P: Psychotherapy of a Plains Indian		
2015	My Golden Days	Trois souvenirs de ma jeunesse	
2017	Ismael's Ghosts	Les fantômes d'Ismaël	
2019	Oh Mercy!	Roubaix, une lumière	
2021	Deception	Tromperie	
2022	Brother and Sister	Frère et Sœur	
2024	Filmlovers!	Spectateurs!	Docudrama
2025	Two Pianos	Deux pianos	
TBA	The Thing That Hurts		Post-production

=== Documentary film ===
- L'Aimée (2007)

=== Television ===
Year	Title	Director	Writer	Notes
2014	La Forêt	Yes	Yes	TV movie
2022	In Therapy	Yes	No	7 episodes
