= Pearl Chanda =

English actress

- Born: Pearl Iannelli Chanda; 11 March 1992 (age 34); Balham, London, England
- Education: RADA
- Occupation: Actress
- Years active: 2011–present

Pearl Iannelli Chanda (born 11 March 1992) is an English actress. She is known for her theatre work and her roles in the Canal+ series War of the Worlds (2021–2022) and the film See How They Run (2022).

== Early life and education ==
Chanda was born in Balham, in the south London Borough of Wandsworth. She is of Indian and Italian descent. She attended the BRIT School, a specialist performing arts school in Croydon. She graduated with a Bachelor of Arts degree in acting from the Royal Academy of Dramatic Art (RADA) in 2013.

== Career ==
Chanda gained prominence through her work in theatre, making her stage debut in 2013 as Nina in the Headlong production of The Seagull. The following year, she made her television debut with a guest appearance in an episode of the BBC One soap opera Holby City. She played Julia in the 2014 Royal Shakespeare Company production of The Two Gentlemen of Verona.

Chanda appeared in the 2015 ITV miniseries Arthur & George as Maud Edalji. That same year, she had stage roles in Crave at the Crucible Theatre in Sheffield, The Angry Brigade at the Bush Theatre in London, and The Glass Menagerie at the Nuffield Theatre in Southampton. This was followed by roles in Ink at the Almeida and Duke of York's Theatre in 2017, One for Sorrow at the Royal Court Theatre in 2018, and Three Sisters in 2019, also at the Almeida. Meanwhile, she had a small role in Motherland on BBC Two.

In 2020, Chanda played DC Laura Simpson in the first series of the ITV crime drama McDonald & Dodds, and Nilufer in two episodes of Michaela Coel's BBC One limited series I May Destroy You. She also had a film role in the horror film Marionnette. Chanda joined the main cast of the British-French science fiction production War of the Worlds for its second and third series, as Zoe.

Chanda played Cassie in the stage adaptation of The Taxidermist's Daughter at the Chichester Festival Theatre in 2022. She appears in the 2022 mystery comedy film See How They Run as Sheila Sim. Chanda was able to discuss the role and character with Sim’s son Michael Attenborough whom Chanda had worked with previously.

== Acting credits ==
=== Film ===
Year	Title	Role	Notes
2014	Mr. Turner	Theatre Actor	
2016	The Big Return of Ray Lamere	Lilly	Short film
2020	Marionette	Margie	
2022	See How They Run	Sheila Sim	

=== Television ===
Year	Title	Role	Notes
2013	Holby City	Imogen Parker	Episode: "Father's Day"
2014	Royal Shakespeare Company: The Two Gentlemen of Verona	Julia	Recording
2015	Arthur & George	Maud Edalji	Miniseries
2017	Endeavour	Bettina Pettybon	Episode: "Canticle"
2017	Motherland	Debbie Louise	2 episodes
2020	McDonald & Dodds	DC Laura Simpson	2 episodes
2020	I May Destroy You	Nilufer	2 episodes
2021–2022	War of the Worlds	Zoe	Main role (season 2-3)
2024	Mary & George	Frances Carr, Countess of Somerset	Miniseries

=== Theatre ===
Year	Title	Role	Notes
2012	The Seagull	Nina	Headlong
2013	Godchild	Minnie	Hampstead Theatre, London
2014	The Two Gentlemen of Verona	Julia	Royal Shakespeare Theatre, Stratford-upon-Avon
2015	Crave	C	Sheffield Crucible Theatre
2015	The Angry Brigade	Anna / Henderson	Bush Theatre, London
2015	The Glass Menagerie	Laura	Nuffield Theatre, Southampton
2017	Ink	Stephanie Rahn	Almeida Theatre / Duke of York's Theatre, London
2018	One for Sorrow	Imogen	Royal Court Theatre, London
2019	Three Sisters	Masha	Almeida Theatre
2022	The Taxidermist's Daughter	Cassie	Chichester Festival Theatre
2023	The White Factory	Rivka Kaufman	Marylebone Theatre, London
2023–2024	The House of Bernarda Alba	Magdalena	National Theatre, London
2024	The Harmony Test	Zoe	Hampstead Theatre, London
2025	Hedda	Hedda Gabler	Orange Tree Theatre, London
2026	Cleansed	Grace	Almeida Theatre, London
