= The Hook Up Plan =

French television series

- French: Plan Coeur
- Genre: Romantic comedy
- Created by: Noémie Saglio; Julien Teisseire; Chris Lang
- Starring: Zita Hanrot; Sabrina Ouazani; Joséphine Draï; Marc Ruchmann; Syrus Shahidi
- Country of origin: France
- Original language: French
- No. of seasons: 3
- No. of episodes: 21

Production
- Production location: Paris
- Cinematography: Marc Koninckx afc-sbc
- Production company: Unrated Studios

Original release
- Network: Netflix
- Release: December 7, 2018 – January 1, 2022

The Hook Up Plan (French: Plan Coeur) is a romantic comedy television series and the second French series produced for Netflix after Marseille.

The show premiered on December 7, 2018, and Season 2 premiered on October 11, 2019. A special episode about the COVID-19 pandemic was added to Netflix on August 26, 2020 in France.

In December 2020, the show was renewed for a third and final season, which premiered on January 1, 2022.

== Premise ==
Elsa, on the verge of turning thirty and stuck in an uninspiring job, finds herself still hung up on her ex-boyfriend two years after their breakup. Her friends, hoping to help her break out of her rut and find some confidence, decide to hire a male escort to take her on a few dates.

== Cast ==
=== Main cast ===
- Zita Hanrot: Elsa "El" Payette, Charlotte and Émilie's best friend
- Sabrina Ouazani: Charlotte "Cha" Ben Smires, Elsa and Émilie's best friend, Antoine's sister
- Joséphine Draï: Émilie "Milou" Châtaigne, Elsa and Charlotte's best friend, and Antoine's partner
- Marc Ruchmann: Julio "Jules Dupont" Saldenha, the gigolo, Roman's best friend
- Syrus Shahidi: Antoine Ben Smires, Matthieu and Maxime's friend, Charlotte's brother, and Émilie's partner
- Tom Dingler: Matthieu, Antoine and Maxime's friend
- Guillaume Labbé: Maxime "Max" Pauillac, Antoine and Matthieu's friend, and Elsa's ex-boyfriend
- Yvan Naubron: Roman, Julio's best friend
- Ludivine de Chastenet: Chantal, Elsa's colleague and friend

=== Recurring cast ===
- Jean-Michel Martial: Dr Philippe Payette, Elsa's father (season 1)
- Karina Testa: Manon, Antoine's colleague (season 1)
- Nanou Garcia: Anita Saldenha, Julio's mother (season 1)
- Anne Depétrini: Valérie, a regular client of Julio (season 1)
- Alexia Barlier: Gaïa, Maxime's new partner (season 1)
- Stéphanie Murat: Audrey Payette, Elsa's mother (season 1, season 3)
- Aude Legastelois: Anaïs Payette, Elsa's sister (season 1)
- Victor Meutelet: Arthur, the intern (season 2)
- Aurélie Vérillon: Rachel, Julio's producer (season 2)

== Episodes ==
Season	Episodes	Originally released
1	8	December 7, 2018
2	6	October 11, 2019
Covid 19 Special		November 6, 2020
3	6	January 1, 2022

=== Season 1 (2018) ===
No. overall	No. in season	Title	Directed by	Written by	Original release date
1	1	"The Secret Plan" (French: Plan secret)	Noémie Saglio	Chris Lang, Noémie Saglio and Julien Teisseire	December 7, 2018
2	2	"The Sloppy Plan" (French: Plan boulette)	Noémie Saglio	Chris Lang, Noémie Saglio and Julien Teisseire	December 7, 2018
3	3	"The Booty Plan" (French: Plan cul)	Noémie Saglio	Chris Lang, Noémie Saglio and Julien Teisseire	December 7, 2018
4	4	"The Love Plan" (French: Plan love)	Noémie Saglio	Chris Lang, Noémie Saglio and Julien Teisseire	December 7, 2018
5	5	"The Party Plan" (French: Plan teuf)	Renaud Bertrand	Chris Lang, Noémie Saglio, Julien Teisseire and Scott Weinger	December 7, 2018
6	6	"The Lame Plan" (French: Plan pourri)	Renaud Bertrand	Chris Lang, Noémie Saglio, Julien Teisseire and Scott Weinger	December 7, 2018
7	7	"The Solo Plan" (French: Plan solo)	Renaud Bertrand	Chris Lang, Noémie Saglio, Julien Teisseire and Scott Weinger	December 7, 2018
8	8	"The Exit Plan" (French: Plan de sortie)	Renaud Bertrand	Chris Lang, Noémie Saglio, Julien Teisseire and Scott Weinger	December 7, 2018

=== Season 2 (2019) ===
No. overall	No. in season	Title	Directed by	Written by	Original release date
9	1	"The Homecoming Plan" (French: Plan retour)	Renaud Bertrand, Noémie Saglio	Chris Lang	October 11, 2019
10	2	"The Llama Plan" (French: Plan lama)	Renaud Bertrand, Noémie Saglio	Chris Lang	October 11, 2019
11	3	"The Backup Plan" (French: Plan de secours)	Renaud Bertrand, Noémie Saglio	Chris Lang	October 11, 2019
12	4	"The Pick-Up Plan" (French: Plan drague)	Renaud Bertrand, Noémie Saglio	Chris Lang	October 11, 2019
13	5	"The After Plan" (French: Plan d'après)	Renaud Bertrand, Noémie Saglio	Chris Lang	October 11, 2019
14	6	"The Love Plan" (French: Plan cœur)	Renaud Bertrand, Noémie Saglio	Chris Lang	October 11, 2019

=== Covid 19 Special (2020) ===
No. overall	No. in season	Title	Directed by	Written by	Original release date
15	1	"The Lockdown Plan" (French: Plan confiné.e.s)	Noémie Saglio	Chris Lang	August 26, 2020 (France); November 6, 2020 (Netflix)

=== Season 3 (2022) ===
No. overall	No. in season	Title	Directed by	Written by	Original release date
16	1	"The Wrong Plan" (French: Faux plan)	Noémie Saglio	Noémie Saglio & Julien Teisseire	January 1, 2022
17	2	"The War Plan" (French: War plan)	Noémie Saglio	Noémie Saglio & Julien Teisseire	January 1, 2022
18	3	"The High and Dry Plan" (French: En plan)	Noémie Saglio	Noémie Saglio & Julien Teisseire	January 1, 2022
19	4	"The Worst Plan" (French: Pire plan)	Noémie Saglio	Noémie Saglio & Julien Teisseire	January 1, 2022
20	5	"The Sorority Plan" (French: Sororiplan)	Noémie Saglio	Noémie Saglio & Julien Teisseire	January 1, 2022
21	6	"The Final Plan" (French: Dernier plan)	Noémie Saglio & Julien Teisseire	Noémie Saglio & Julien Teisseire	January 1, 2022
