= Alexandra Kremer-Khomassouridze =

French photographer

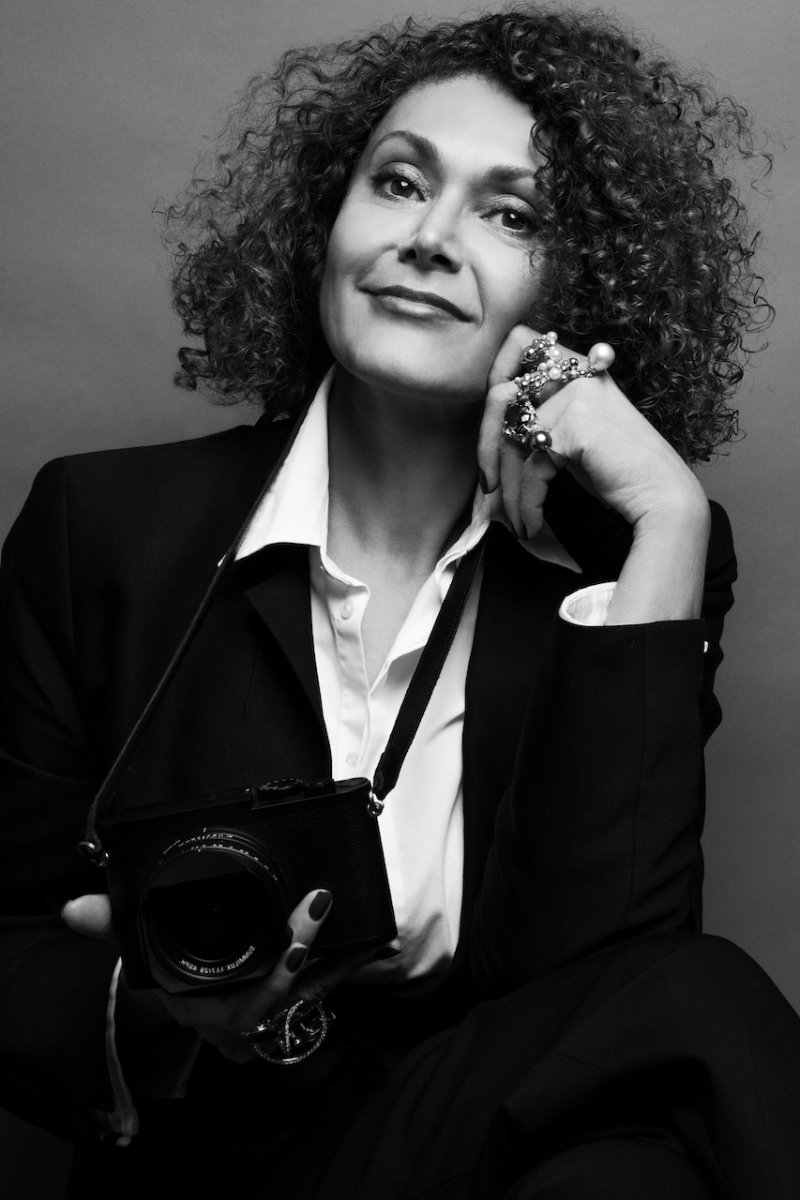
- Education: Azerbaijan State Academy of Fine Arts, IRIS Photo School, École Française d'Enseignement Technique (EFET), Master's degree in photojournalism from the Centre de Formation et de Perfectionnement des Journalistes (CFPJ), where she studied under war photographer Yan Morvan.
- Occupations: Fine art photographer, contemporary artist
- Known for: Life Music; Faces of Freedom; What Happiness Is
- Children: Angie Kremer. Anna Zhivilo
- Relatives: Mahmud Abdullayev (grandfather)
- Website: kremeralexandra.com

Alexandra Kremer-Khomassouridze is a French photographer and collector of historical photographs of Georgian and Azerbaijani descent. She is known for her work in art and conceptual photography, often exploring themes such as identity, cultural expression, and the relationship between reality and illusion.

She has exhibited her work internationally and collaborated with musicians, festivals, and media outlets across Europe and the Middle East. Kremer-Khomassouridze primarily works in black and white, and her photographs are produced in limited editions. Since 2024, she has been represented by the Paris- and Geneva-based Galerie Esther Woerdehoff.

== Biography ==
Alexandra Kremer-Khomassouridze was born in USSR, and raised in Georgia and Azerbaijan in a family of musicians. Her grandfather was Mahmud Əli oğlu Abdullayev, a Soviet and Azerbaijani oil engineer. She graduated from the Azerbaijan State Academy of Fine Arts and moved to Paris in 1989 where she earned a degree in gemology from the Institut National de Gemmologie. Continuing her studies in art and photography, she attended EFET and the IRIS Photo School, and later obtained a Master's degree in photojournalism from the Centre de Formation et de Perfectionnement des Journalistes (CFPJ), where she studied under war photographer Yan Morvan. She worked in a theater in Baku after graduating from the Azerbaijan State Academy of Fine Arts.

Between 1997 and 1999, she worked as a photojournalist with the Paris-based Gamma Photo Agency,and from 2000 onward collaborated with Eyedea Photo Agency. From 1994 to 2009, she photographed internationally renowned classical musicians such as Mstislav Rostropovich, Yuri Bashmet, and Gidon Kremer for a collection that was exhibited in 2009.

Her work has been featured in international exhibitions and publications. She is the author of the photography book Live Music, which includes backstage and rehearsal portraits of classical musicians such as Mstislav Rostropovich, Daniel Barenboim, Sofia Gubaidulina, Gidon Kremer, Martha Argerich, and Arvo Pärt.

Between 1998 and 2002, she also worked as a curator and project coordinator for the Russian editions of French magazines such as Gala and Paris Match. From 2016 to 2019, she focused on backstage and onstage theatre photography in collaboration with Lithuanian director Oskaras Koršunovas, including work presented at the Avignon Festival.

From May 9 to June 28, 2026, the photographic installation The Gondolier by Alexandra Kremer-Khomassouridze was presented at the Palazzo Ca' Tron in Venice, Italy. The installation was featured as part of Diario Veneziano, a project by Ilya and Emilia Kabakov held in conjunction with the 61st Venice Biennale.

Since 2024, she has been represented by the Paris- and Geneva-based Galerie Esther Woerdehoff.

Her notable projects include:

- Live Music – backstage portraits of classical musicians;
- Faces of Freedom – Project exploring identity and freedom, inspired by the first article of the Universal Declaration of Human Rights: "All human beings are born free and equal in dignity and rights."
- Soul of Fuel – a reportage on Neft Daşları, an offshore oil platform in the Caspian Sea;
- What Happiness Is... – an ongoing project printed on handmade Japanese paper and finished using traditional Japanese watercolor techniques.
- La Divina Commedia of Life – a photographic series born on stage and backstage, exploring the space between theatre, reality and the illusion of life.

Her photographs are produced in limited editions of three prints per image, each manually processed by the artist. She has also contributed photography for classical music labels such as EMI (UK), Teldec (Germany), and Nonesuch (USA).

Her work has appeared in publications including Paris Match, Le Monde, Le Figaro, Clásica, World of Azerbaijan, Photo, Hermitage, and Diapason.

== Selected exhibitions ==
Kremer-Khomassouridze has exhibited her work internationally at major art fairs, festivals, and cultural institutions. Selected exhibitions include:

- 2026 - SCUROCHIARO, « La Divina Commedia of Life « photography exhibition on the occasion of the 30th anniversary of the Elba Isola Musicale d’Europa Festival.
- 2026 – The Gondolier (photographic installation), presented within Ilya and Emilia Kabakov's project Diario Veneziano at the 61st Venice Biennale, Palazzo Ca’ Tron, Venice, Italy (May 9 – June 28).
- 2025 – Photo London, Galerie Esther Woerdehoff, Somerset House, London
- 2024 – Paris Photo, Galerie Esther Woerdehoff, Grand Palais, Paris
- 2024 – AIPAD, Galerie Esther Woerdehoff, Park Avenue Armory, New York
- 2024 – Photographs exhibited at PhotoHouse, Paris, during a Photo London presentation.
- 2018 – Life/Live Music, Lithuanian National Philharmonic Society, Vilnius
- 2016 – “Faces of Freedom”. Tbilisi Photo Festival, Tbilisi Photography House, Georgia
- 2015 – Faces of Freedom, solo photographic exhibition, Asia House, London, curated by Farah Pirieva, presented as part of the Buta Festival of Azerbaijani Arts in London.
- 2013 – Musée de Minéralogie, Paris
- 2011 – “Life /Live Music” Salle Pleyel, Paris
- 2011 – Life/ Live Music, Museum Kronberger Malerkolonie, Germany
- 2010 – Born in the USSR – Made in France, Espace des Blancs Manteaux, Paris
- 2009 – Azerbaijan State Philharmonic Hall, Baku
- 2009 – “Life /Live Music”, Yugra-Classic Concert and Theater Center, Khanty-Mansiysk, Siberia.
- 2009 – “Life /Live Music”, Live Music, Great Hall of the Saint Petersburg Philharmonia, Saint Petersburg
- 2008 – “Life /Live Music”, photographic exhibition of 80 black-and-white works, 5th Moscow World Fine Art Fair, Central Exhibition Hall Manege, Moscow., Moscow

== Publications and archives ==
Kremer-Khomassouridze is the author of the photobook "Life Music" (Fotoloft Gallery, 2008, ISBN 978-5-91435-002-1), featuring backstage portraits of classical musicians. The book is available at the Tschann Library in Paris.

In 2019, she published a children's photobook in Russian titled *Про Аннушку и Деда Мороза* (ISBN 978-5-904065-28-7).

Her photographic archive includes portraits of internationally recognized classical musicians such as Mstislav Rostropovich, Yuri Bashmet, Daniel Barenboim, Gidon Kremer, Vladimir Spivakov, Valery Gergiev, Yo‑Yo Ma, and Arvo Pärt.

Since 2009, distribution of her music-related photography has been managed by the Lebrecht Music & Arts Photo Library and, more recently, by Bridgeman Images.
