= Ad vitam =

Ad vitam is a Latin phrase meaning "for life"

Ad Vitam may also refer to:

- Ad Vitam (company), a French film company
- Ad Vitam (TV series), a 2018 French TV series
- Ad Vitam (film), a 2025 French film

== See also ==
- Immortel, ad vitam, a 2004 film by Enki Bilal
