= Coulier =

Coulier is a surname. Notable people with the surname include:

- Dave Coulier (born 1959), American actor, voice actor, stand-up comedian, impressionist and television host
- Gilles Coulier (born 1986), Belgian film director and screenwriter
- Mark Coulier (born 1964), British make-up artist
