= Soria Zeroual =

French film actor (born 1970)

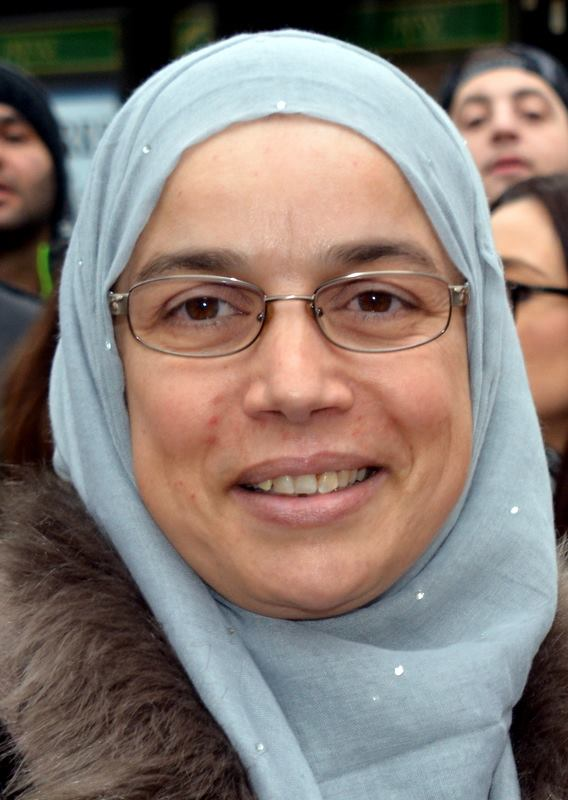
- Zeroual in 2016
- Born: 14 May 1970 (age 54); Batna, Algeria
- Occupation: Actress
- Years active: 2015—present

Soria Zeroual (born 14 May 1970) is an Algerian cleaning lady and non-professional actress. Zeroual has been living in France since 2002. She plays the title role in the film Fatima, directed by Philippe Faucon. She was nominated for the César Award for Best Actress for her role in the film.
