= Ouidad Elma =

French-Moroccan actress

- Born: Rif Mountains, Morocco
- Occupation: Actress

Ouidad Elma is a French-Moroccan actress. She was born on October 2, 1992, on the Rif Mountains, Morocco. She grew up in Paris in the neighborhood of Menilmontant.

== Early life ==
Elma began acting classes when she was six years old. She joined the theatre company in Paris and began acting professionally at the age of sixteen. She played her first character for the movie "Sa raison d'être" directed by Renaud Bertrand. Then she played a lead role in the French film "Plan B" directed by Kamel Saleh. She then moved to Morocco and pursued her acting career by playing lead roles in various films. She played in "Love The Medina", "Zero" directed by Noureddine Lakhmari and in "The Rif Lover", "L'Amante du Rif" directed by Narjiss Nejjar.

== Film career ==
In 2014 Elma appeared in the TV miniseries The Red Tent and the film Madness. The following year, she appeared in the film Killing Jesus and the FX series Tyrant.

In 2016, she signed with the Medi 1 TV channel in the television series of Ghoul and the French film Tazzeka. Also that year, Elma appeared in the BBC series The Last Post which aired in October 2017.

== Awards and nominations ==
Elma has obtained nominations and awards for her films, notably at the Dubai international film festival, Festival International du Film Francophone de Namur and Marrakech International Film Festival in 2011 and 2012. In 2015, she won the Best Actress Award for "Madness" at the Agadir Film Festival.

== Music ==
In 2015, Elma appeared in the music video for Skrillex's song "Fuck That."

== Filmography ==
=== Film ===
- 2021 : The Last Mercenary : Farah
- 2018 : Amin directed by Philippe Faucon
- 2018 : Demi-soeurs directed by Saphia Azzeddine and François Régis Jeanne
- 2016 : Tazzeka directed by Jean-Philippe Gaud : Salma
- 2015 : La lisière (Short) directed by Simon Saulnier: Hawa
- 2015 : Chaïbia directed by Youssef Britel : Amal
- 2014 : 7, rue de la Folie/ Madness directed by Jawad Rhalib : Sara
- 2012: Zéro directed by Noureddine Lakhmari : Nadia
- 2011: L'amante du rif directed by Narjiss Nejjar : Radia
- 2011: Love in the medina directed by Abdelhai Laraki : Zineb
- 2010 : Plan B directed by Kamel Saleh : Lydia

=== Television ===
- 2017 : The Last Post directed by Jonny Campbell and Miranda Bowen : Yusra
- 2016 : Ghoul ( 30 episodes ) directed by Jean Luc Herbulot : Amal
- 2015 : Tyrant 2.2 - Enter The Fates directed by Gwyneth Horder-Payton : Amina
- 2015 : Killing Jesus directed by Christopher Menaul : Sarah
- 2014 : The Red Tent directed by Roger Young : Abi
- 2008 : Sa raison d'être directed by Renaud Bertrand : Kayna
