= Zita Hanrot =

French actress (born 1989)

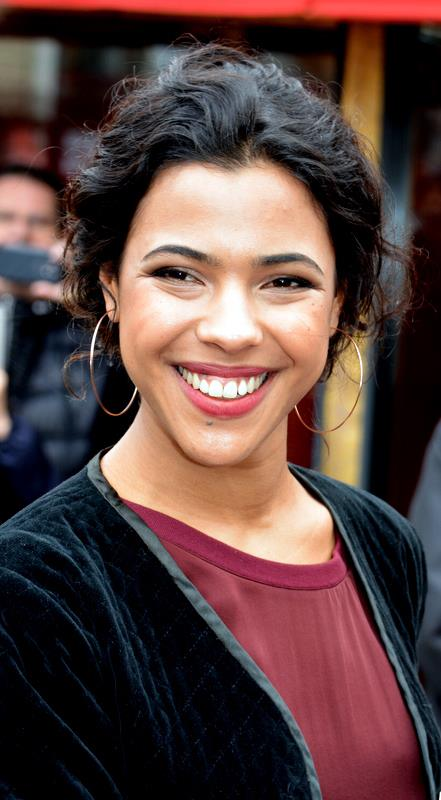
- Zita Hanrot in February 2016
- Born: 7 December 1989 (age 36); Marseille, France
- Occupation: Actress
- Years active: 2004—present

Zita Hanrot (French: [zita ɑ̃ʁo]; born 7 December 1989 in Marseille, France) is a French actress. She received widespread critical acclaim and later won the César Award for Most Promising Actress in 2016 for her role in the film, Fatima. From 2018 to 2022, she starred in three seasons of the Netflix original French-language comedy, Plan Coeur ("The Hook Up Plan"). In 2024, she starred in the television series, La Maison and the biopic, The Ballad of Suzanne Césaire.

== Early life ==
Zita Hanrot was born in 1989, to an English mother of Jamaican descent and a French father. Her father is a graphic designer and her mother is an illustrator and graphic designer. Many of her father's relatives are set designers, landscapers, or architects. She grew up with an interest in artistic careers and took classes in classical dance as a child.

After graduating from high school in Marseille, Hanrot enrolled in art history classes, originally intending to pursue a career similar to her parents. However, she disliked the courses and later dropped out after studying for three months. Instead, she enrolled in private theatre classes at the Ecole D'Art Dramatique Sylvia Roche in Marseille with the intention of leaving her hometown to pursue acting professionally. She successfully auditioned for a place at École du Jeu in Paris at age 20. She lived in an 8 sq. m. apartment and worked evening shifts at a café. In 2011, she was accepted into the Conservatoire national supérieur d'art dramatique, France's national drama school, in Paris. She graduated in 2014.

== Career ==
Hanrot appeared in commercials such as the French army campaign (2006) alongside the French actor Karl E. Landler. She has cited the actress Béatrice Dalle as an inspiration, particularly for her role in the 1986 film Betty Blue.

Before graduating from the Conservatory, she was cast in her first film role in 2012 in Radiostars, directed by Romain Lévy, in which she plays the younger sister of Manu Payet. She subsequently played minor roles in The New Girlfriend in 2013, and Eden in 2014. Her breakthrough role came in 2015's Fatima (2015), for which she was awarded the César Award for Most Promising Actress. In the film, directed by Philippe Faucon, she plays Nesrine, a medical student and the daughter of a north-African immigrant, determined to improve her position in life.

Following the success of Fatima, Hanrot filmed a role in Marie Garel Weiss's directorial debut film called, La Fête est finie ("The party is over" in English) in 2016. The movie was released in 2017. In June 2019, she began filming the ecological whistleblower drama, Red Soil. Hanrot plays an occupational nurse who uncovers corruption at the chemical factory where she works. The movie was later released in the UK for streaming services on 16 August 2021.

From 2018 to 2022, she starred in three seasons of the Netflix original French-language comedy, Plan Coeur (literally "Heart Plan", but marketed as "The Hook Up Plan" in English-speaking regions). A special lockdown episode was filmed in France in 2020 and highlighted the changes in the country due to the COVID-19 pandemic.

In 2020, she was among ten actors selected for the European Film Promotion's European Shooting Star award, which highlights up-and-coming film talent across Europe.

In 2024, Harper's Bazaar Australia praised her work in the French fashion drama television series, La Maison, which streamed worldwide on AppleTV+. Hanrot stated that her character in the series, "Paloma", a Berlin-based fashion designer, was inspired by British fashion designer, Alexander McQueen. To prepare for the role, she watched documentaries on fashion history with a specific focus on McQueen's career; Hanrot is a fan of McQueen. La Maison has been compared to the Max drama, Succession, with critics dubbing it, "The French Succession".

In 2024, she starred in the biopic, The Ballad of Suzanne Césaire, as the titular character; the film was screened at Toronto International Film Festival in Canada and at the Lincoln Center in New York City in the autumn of 2024.

== Personal life ==
Her brother, Idrissa Hanrot, is also an actor, starring notably in the 2016 film Five. In April 2022, Hanrot revealed on her personal Instagram account that she was expecting her first child.

In an interview with Chanel, she said that she enjoys reading and cited works by French philosopher and psychoanalyst, Anne Dufourmantelle, as some of her favourite books. In that same interview, she revealed that her father's garden in Marseille is one of her favourite places to read and expressed that she would like to play Haruki Murakami's character, "Aomame", from his 1Q84 trilogy or "Nora" from Henrik Ibsen's 1879 play, A Doll's House. Hanrot previously studied Ibsen while attending drama school in Paris during her early 20s. She cites Edward Scissorhands as a film that frightened her as a child and her favourite director is Danish filmmaker, Lars von Trier.

Hanrot is fluent in English. She lived in Marseille until she was 20 and resides in Paris as of 2024.

== Filmography ==
Year	Title	Role	Notes
2004	Le Tuteur	Malika	TV series
2012	Radiostars	Jennifer	Film debut
2013	Run	Dounia	Short film
2014	Eden	Anaïs	
2014	The New Girlfriend	Restaurant waitress	
2014	Errance	The girl on the train	Short film
2015	Rose et le soldat	Rose	Telefilm
2015	Nuit/Béton	Morgane	Short film
2015	Chefs	Nadia	TV mini-series
2015	Fatima	Nesrine	César Award for Most Promising Actress
2015	Chez Victoire	Iris	Telefilm
2015	Point du Jour	Sabrina	Short film
2016	Le Gang des Antillais	Linda	
2016	De sas en sas		
2016	T.A.N.K.	Zoé	10 episodes; television series
2017	La fête est finie	Sihem	French film
2017	K.O.	Dina	French film
2018	Paul Sanchez est revenu!	Marion	French film
2018-2022	The Hook Up Plan	Elsa	Netflix original series - 21 Episodes (3 seasons)
2019	The Swallows of Kabul	Zunaira (voice)	
2020	School Life	Samia	Netflix Original
2020	Red Soil	Nour Hamadi	Film; known as Rouge in French-language markets
2021	Love, Death & Robots	Hirald	Season 2, episode "Snow in the Desert"
2022	Angry Annie	Hélène	French film
2023	My Sole Desire	Mia	French film
2023	Lee	Ady Fidelin	
2024	La Maison	Paloma Castel	AppleTV+ original series (Lead role)
2024	The Ballad of Suzanne Césaire	Suzanne Césaire	Titular role/Lead
2025	Ad Vitam	Manon	Netflix original film
