= War of the Worlds (2019 TV series) =

Science fiction television series

- Genre: Drama; Science fiction
- Created by: Howard Overman
- Based on: The War of the Worlds by H. G. Wells
- Written by: Howard Overman
- Directed by: Gilles Coulier; Richard Clark
- Starring: Gabriel Byrne; Elizabeth McGovern; Léa Drucker; Adel Bencherif; Emilie de Preissac; Natasha Little; Daisy Edgar-Jones; Ty Tennant; Bayo Gbadamosi; Stephen Campbell Moore; Stéphane Caillard; Aaron Heffernan; Pearl Chanda; Molly Windsor; Lizzie Brocheré; Lukas Haas
- Countries of origin: United Kingdom; France
- Original languages: English; French
- No. of series: 3
- No. of episodes: 24

Production
- Executive producers: Howard Overman; Julian Murphy; Johnny Capps; Gilles Coulier
- Producer: Gareth Williams
- Production locations: United Kingdom; France; Belgium
- Production companies: Urban Myth Films; Fox Networks Group; StudioCanal

Original release
- Network: Canal+ (France); Fox (UK; series 1); Star (UK; series 2–3)
- Release: October 28, 2019 – September 26, 2022

War of the Worlds is a science fiction television series produced by Fox Networks Group and StudioCanal-backed Urban Myth Films. The series was created and written by Howard Overman and directed by Gilles Coulier and Richard Clark. The series is an adaptation of The War of the Worlds, an 1898 novel by H. G. Wells about Earth coming to terms in the wake of a sudden Martian invasion. It is the third television adaptation of the novel. It stars Gabriel Byrne, Léa Drucker and Daisy Edgar-Jones, along with an ensemble supporting cast.

The first season consists of eight episodes and premiered in France in October 2019. An eight-episode second season premiered in France in May 2021. War of the Worlds was renewed for a final eight-episode season in July 2021, which aired in September 2022.

== Premise ==
The series takes place in contemporary Britain and France, but it serves as a re-imagining of the classic H. G. Wells novel.

In this new take on War of the Worlds, when astronomers detect a transmission from another star, it is definitive proof of intelligent extra-terrestrial life. Earth's population waits for further contact with bated breath, but does not have to wait long. Within days, mankind is all but wiped out, with just pockets of humanity left in an eerily deserted world. As alien ships appear in the sky, the survivors ask a burning question — who are these attackers and why are they hell-bent on our destruction?

— Den of Geek

== Cast ==
=== Main ===
- Gabriel Byrne as Bill Ward
- Léa Drucker as Catherine Durand
- Daisy Edgar-Jones as Emily Gresham (seasons 1–2)
- Elizabeth McGovern as Helen Brown, Bill's ex-wife (season 1; guest season 2)
- Bayo Gbadamosi as Kariem Gat Wich Machar
- Adel Bencherif as Colonel Mustafa Mokrani (season 1; guest season 2-3)
- Emilie de Preissac as Sophia Durand, Catherine's sister
- Natasha Little as Sarah Gresham, Emily and Tom's mother
- Ty Tennant as Tom Gresham, Emily's brother
- Stephen Campbell Moore as Jonathan Gresham, Emily and Tom's father
- Paul Gorostidi as Nathan
- Stéphane Caillard as Chloe Dumont
- Aaron Heffernan as Ash Daniel (seasons 1, 3; recurring season 2)
- Mathieu Torloting as Sacha Dumont, Chloe's son (season 2; recurring season 1)
- Pearl Chanda as Zoe (seasons 2–3)
- Ania Sowinski as Adina, an alien leader (seasons 2–3)
- Molly Windsor as Martha (season 3)
- Lizzie Brocheré as Juliet (season 3)
- Lukas Haas as Richard (season 3)

=== Featured ===
The following actors are credited in the opening titles of only one or two episodes in which they play a significant role.

- Georgina Rich as Rachel (guest, season 1 & 3)
- Michael Marcus as Dan Ward, Bill and Helen's son (guest, seasons 1 & 3)
- Alysson Paradis as Officer Clara
- Guillaume Gouix as Noah Dumont, Chloe's brother

== Episodes ==
| Season | Episodes | Originally released | |
| Season | Episodes | First released | Last released |
|---|---|---|---|
| 1 | 8 | October 28, 2019 | November 18, 2019 |
| 2 | 8 | May 17, 2021 | June 7, 2021 |
| 3 | 8 | September 5, 2022 | September 26, 2022 |

=== Season 1 (2019) ===
| No. overall | No. in season | Episode | Directed by | Written by | Original French air date |
|---|---|---|---|---|---|
| 1 | 1 | Episode 1 | Gilles Coulier | Howard Overman | October 28, 2019 |
Astronomer Catherine Durand investigates a strong signal from exoplanet Ross 128 b which is of intelligent origin. Soon afterwards a large group of meteors hits the centers of all major inhabited areas of Earth. They are indeed metallic spacecraft. Blind teenager Emily can hear strange pulsing sounds, while scientist Bill recognizes the magnetic signal in the pulses (received by equipment from his brain research). He tries to warn his son Dan and goes to find his ex-wife Helen. The magnetic signal increases and quickly kills all humans who are not underground, underwater or in metallic rooms. In London, Sarah Gresham, with her children, Tom and Emily, fortunately drive into an underground parade, while her husband Jonathan is in Paris, where his taxi plunges into the Seine at an opportune moment. Kariem enters England illegally, hiding inside a metal storage cylinder and emerges to find himself alone in a strange environment. Catherine's sister Sophia tries to reach her at the observatory.
| 2 | 2 | Episode 2 | Gilles Coulier | Howard Overman | October 28, 2019 |
In London, Paris and the French Alps, the survivors try to reach their loved ones, walking among the dead and wondering about the motives of the invaders. Helen and Sarah find it hard to grasp this new reality. Tom and Emily struggle to understand their mother's behaviour, especially when she refuses to let them help Kariem, who has been injured in an attack by a shop keeper. Jonathan decides to make his way alone back to England. Neuroscientist Bill finds the alien methods mystifying. Kariem makes some bad decisions based on fear. Catherine despairs in the search for her sister Sophia. In a Grenoble supermarket, Catherine, Colonel Mokrani and a group of French soldiers have a first encounter with lethal, alien quadrupedal bots.
| 3 | 3 | Episode 3 | Gilles Coulier | Howard Overman | November 4, 2019 |
Helen and Bill arrive too late to find Dan at the command center but learn he escaped when a quadruped bot killed most of the personnel. They manage to incapacitate a quadruped and discover that it is a cyborg, with a biological interior. Sarah and her children meet an orderly outside a hospital, Ash. They find Kariem recuperating inside and Ash orders them to get over their previous meeting. Once again, only Emily hears the alien pulses, which temporarily restores her sight. Catherine is in shock when the alien pulses – which she hears on equipment – suddenly play the song that she and her colleagues had once broadcast into space, confirming this song attracted the alien attackers to Earth. Jonathan meets Chloe, who warns him of the quadrupeds; they head north together – bound for London and Amiens, respectively. After Bill finds Dan's body outside, Helen grieves, then asks Bill to find a way to kill the quadrupeds. A pack of quadrupeds approach the hospital and are positioned to enter.
| 4 | 4 | Episode 4 | Gilles Coulier | Howard Overman | November 4, 2019 |
Catherine finds the source of the sounds and Colonel Mokrani and his team go out to investigate. Sarah and her children have a close encounter with a quadruped. Sacha finds a meteor site and hears the noises Emily hears in London. Helen and Bill are determined to find a way to destroy all the quadruped cyborgs. Kariem and Emily bond. Arriving at her childhood home with Jonathan, Chloe finds Sacha and her policeman brother, Noah. Ash and Kariem return to the hospital and are startled to find that the quadruped bots have taken the nursery babies, after killing the other people there.
| 5 | 5 | Episode 5 | Richard Clark | Howard Overman | November 11, 2019 |
Helen and Bill meet up with, and join, the Greshams' quintet of survivors. They try to find a way to cope with their situation. Bill finds a student in Tom. Emily feels a strange connection with the alien invaders. Sacha overhears Chloe berating Noah for raping her when she was 15, resulting in Sacha. Emily and Kariem have sex. Further confirmation of what the quadruped cyborgs may be after is revealed when one kills a pregnant woman by removing the fetus. Jonathan is baffled by Sacha's behaviour, seeing him leave his "uncle" Noah to be killed. Catherine, Colonel Mokrani and his team discover a destroyed alien ship, containing some organic material ("is that what they look like?"), where some malfunctioning quadrupeds are harmlessly wandering through the wreckage.
| 6 | 6 | Episode 6 | Richard Clark | Howard Overman | November 11, 2019 |
Emily's sight recovers as she hears the noise, then she calmly stares at a quadruped cyborg until it turns and walks away. Bill is intrigued by her connection to the cyborgs, others question it. Sacha discovers he has a connection to the cyborgs too – which cause him to briefly see a girl (Emily) he does not know. Jonathan, joined by Chloe and Sacha on the journey to the Channel and England, finds Sacha's behaviour very hard to understand, including Sacha's sudden interest in Emily, when he sees Jonathan's family photo. In London, the group of survivors make their way to the university lab where Bill and Tom try to gain information on the quadrupeds. They find the aliens know more about humans than they imagined possible. Emily clashes with her mother. Helen and Sarah take a gamble and end up in a precarious situation. Tom's birthday needs celebrating and everybody reconciles. Catherine and Mokrani's team return to the observatory, where they are surprised to find Sophia but none of the other soldiers.
| 7 | 7 | Episode 7 | Richard Clark | Howard Overman | November 18, 2019 |
Sophia managed to survive when she hid inside a mountain service tunnel before the deadly alien signal was transmitted. She then found a young English boy, Theo, who she takes responsibility for. They spend some time with other survivors, before walking to Catherine's mountaintop observatory. Bill tries to get information from Emily but she is sympathetic to the aliens, rationalizing that humans killing in war is similar to the aliens killing humans. Chloe discovers that Sacha stole Jonathan's picture, convincing her that he is twisted enough to have facilitated Noah's death. Sacha attacks Jonathan, then runs into the forest. Emily has two more friendly encounters with a quadruped cyborg, not telling anyone about the first instance, then Helen is killed by the cyborg in the second instance. At the start of Emily's second encounter, Sacha has a friendly cyborg encounter in France; both teenagers have visions of each other at the same moment. Sophia, who has had no choice but to kick her addictions, convinces Catherine that the world may end, so she should have no choice but to act on her feelings for Colonel Mokrani. Catherine develops a theory that the high-frequency alien noise connects all the cyborgs, similar to birds having innate connections. She wonders if her low frequency science array caused the nearby alien crash.
| 8 | 8 | Episode 8 | Richard Clark | Howard Overman | November 18, 2019 |
Catherine, Sophia and Mokrani's troops move down the mountain to the ski resort to look for the other survivors. Along the way, they discover that the missing troops at the observatory have been killed by the cyborgs. Ash further doubts Emily's motives and confronts her mother, while Bill wrestles with his new reality. Jonathan learns the truth about Sacha's father from Chloe. Emily encounters another cyborg and Sacha does too at the same moment. They both experience an intimate vision together. Emily believes she must meet up and communicate with the aliens. Kariem allows her to go, but only on the condition that he goes with her. Sacha decides to follow Jonathan and Chloe to England, secretly hoping to meet his daughter, Emily. The cyborgs launch an attack at the ski resort and Sophia is hit. Catherine puts her frequency jamming theory to the test. Emily enters a massive cylindrical-shaped alien ship located on the river Thames. Inside, she finds the newborn babies and an alien that looks very human in form.

=== Season 2 (2021) ===
| No. overall | No. in season | Episode | Directed by | Written by | Original French air date |
|---|---|---|---|---|---|
| 9 | 1 | Episode 9 | Richard Clark | Howard Overman | May 17, 2021 |
The Alien shows Emily a vision of a woman on a destroyed and polluted planet, and the alien ship takes off. Six months later more people have arrived at the university and have formed a resistance. Bill is working on a bioweapon based on dead humanoid aliens. Outside Grenoble, Micah is pursued and shot by a group of people but makes it to the Observatory, where he is revealed to be a humanoid alien. Micah is looking for Bill as 'the cause of their suffering'. Jonathan, Chloe and Sascha make it back to London and find a Resistance group in Vauxhall. Three resistance groups make assaults on alien ships that have landed since the attack, and find them deserted - apart from a returned Emily. On leaving they are all ambushed by more humanoid aliens bearing Emily's tattoo. Emily can only remember flashes of memories of her time on the ship, of the same woman she saw in her original vision who asks her to kill Bill.
| 10 | 2 | Episode 10 | Richard Clark | Howard Overman | May 17, 2021 |
Catherine gives the antibiotic to Micah, against orders – he awakens and explains the formulas in the notebooks are the key to moving objects through space and time. Aliens track Micah to the observatory and infiltrate. In the fighting, Theo and Col. Makrani are killed, and his own brother murders Micah. Bill Ward is developing a bioweapon that blocks insulin production with fatal results, and after taking hair samples, discovers that Emily's DNA is almost identical to that of the aliens. Jonathan, Chloe, and Sacha meet up with survivors in London, and Jonathan is reunited with his family, but ultimately chooses to be with Chloe. Sacha and Emily recognize each other from the visions. Later Emily tries to stab Bill in his sleep but is pulled off by Kariem. Bill chooses to try out the bioweapon on Emily. Catherine and Sophia escaped the observatory with Nathan, trying to find Bill Ward's identity.
| 11 | 3 | Episode 11 | Richard Clark | Howard Overman | May 24, 2021 |
| 12 | 4 | Episode 12 | Richard Clark | Howard Overman | May 24, 2021 |
| 13 | 5 | Episode 13 | Ben A. Williams | Howard Overman | May 31, 2021 |
| 14 | 6 | Episode 14 | Ben A. Williams | Howard Overman | May 31, 2021 |
| 15 | 7 | Episode 15 | Ben A. Williams | Howard Overman | June 7, 2021 |
| 16 | 8 | Episode 16 | Ben A. Williams | Howard Overman | June 7, 2021 |

=== Season 3 (2022) ===
| No. overall | No. in season | Episode | Directed by | Written by | Original French air date |
|---|---|---|---|---|---|
| 17 | 1 | Episode 17 | Indra Siera | Howard Overman | September 5, 2022 |
| 18 | 2 | Episode 18 | Indra Siera | Howard Overman | September 5, 2022 |
| 19 | 3 | Episode 19 | Indra Siera | Howard Overman | September 12, 2022 |
| 20 | 4 | Episode 20 | Indra Siera | Howard Overman | September 12, 2022 |
| 21 | 5 | Episode 21 | Indra Siera | Howard Overman | September 19, 2022 |
| 22 | 6 | Episode 22 | Jonas Alexander Arnby | Howard Overman | September 19, 2022 |
| 23 | 7 | Episode 23 | Jonas Alexander Arnby | Howard Overman | September 26, 2022 |
| 24 | 8 | Episode 24 | Jonas Alexander Arnby | Howard Overman | September 26, 2022 |

== Production ==
=== Development ===
War of the Worlds was produced by Fox Networks Group and StudioCanal. AGC Television co-finances and co-distributes the series. The series was executive produced by Overman, Julian Murphy and Johnny Capps. Gilles Coulier and Richard Clark each directed four episodes of the first season, with Coulier directing the first four episode and Clark directing the last four. The series was written by Howard Overman.

By October 2019, the creative team had begun work on a second season. Richard Clark returned to direct the first four episodes, with Ben A. Williams directing the final four. In July 2021, War of the Worlds was renewed for a third season, which aired in 2022. Season 3 was directed by Indra Siera and Jonas Alexander Arnby.

=== Casting ===
Gabriel Byrne and Elizabeth McGovern star in the series. They are joined by Daisy Edgar-Jones and Bayo Gbadamosi as co-stars and Aimee-Ffion Edwards, Stéphane Caillard, Adel Bencherif, Guillaume Gouix, Léa Drucker and Natasha Little as main supporting cast. Greg Kinnear was originally set to star, but was not listed in the starring cast list when it was revealed by Deadline Hollywood in January 2019.

=== Filming ===
Production for the first season took place in the United Kingdom, France and Belgium. The series was filmed in Bristol in March 2019, as well as filming in Cardiff, Newport and London.

The second season began filming on July 13, 2020, with filming concluding on October 22, 2020.

The song “Into My Arms” by Nick Cave is prominently used In the series.

== Release ==
The first series was released in full on MyCanal in France on October 28, 2019, before being broadcast from the same day in weekly batches of two episodes and was released in most parts of Europe and Africa weekly between October 30 and December 18, 2019. The series premiered in the United States on February 16, 2020, on Epix; in the UK on March 5, 2020; and in Canada on October 7, 2020, on CBC Television. Canal+ and Fox Networks Group have the rights to release the series in Europe and Africa. AGC Television distributes the series to the North American market and co-distributes, with StudioCanal, to Latin America, Asia, Australia, New Zealand and the Middle East. Fox Networks Group releases the series in Europe. The series broadcasts on Fox in more than 50 countries and on Epix in the United States and territories.

The eight-episode second season was released in full on May 17, 2021 in France on MyCanal, before being broadcast from the same day in weekly batches of two episodes, mirroring the release of the first season. The season premiered May 24, 2021 on Fox in South Africa; in the United States on Epix on June 6, 2021; and on October 6, 2021, in Canada on CBC Gem.

The eight-episode third season began broadcast from September 5, 2022, in weekly batches of two episodes. The season premiered in the United States on Epix on September 12, 2022.

== Reception ==
Ben Dowell in The Times gave the first series four out of five stars. The AV Club dubbed it "compelling if derivative". NY Times describes it as a "smart, atmospheric genre series".
