= Adama Niane =

Adama Niane may refer to:

- Adama Niane (footballer)
- Adama Niane (actor)
