= Adama Niane (actor) =

French actor (1966–2023)

- Born: 23 August 1966; Paris, France
- Died: 28 January 2023 (aged 56)
- Education: Sorbonne Nouvelle University Paris 3
- Occupation: Actor

Adama Niane (23 August 1966 – 28 January 2023) was a French actor.

== Biography ==
Born in the 18th arrondissement of Paris on 23 August 1966, Niane studied theatre at Sorbonne Nouvelle University Paris 3 and started in the theatre troupe of Philippe Duclos. At the end of the 1980s, he acted onstage in pieces by Alfred de Musset, Pierre de Marivaux, Bernard-Marie Koltès, and Jean-Luc Lagarce.

Niane frequently appeared in recurring television roles in series such as Mystères, PJ, and The Last Panthers. He gained notoriety from his role as Sébastien Sangha in the series Plus belle la vie. He also appeared in minor roles in cinema, portraying serial killer Guy Georges in SK1. He was also part of the cast of Le Gang des Antillais, directed by Jean-Claude Barny.

On 28 January 2023, Niane died at the age of 56.

== Filmography ==
=== Cinema ===
- Mo (1996)
- Baise-moi (2000)
- 35 Shots of Rum (2008)
- SK1 (2014)
- Le Gang des Antillais (2016)
- Perdrix (2019)
- Get In (2019)
- Felicità (2020)

=== Telefilms ===
- Suite en ré (2000)
- Ambre a disparu (2004)
- Imposture (2017)

=== Television ===
- Commissaire Moulin (1992)
- Julie Lescaut (2001)
- Frank Riva (2003)
- Mystère (2007)
- PJ (2009)
- Plus belle la vie (2009)
- Boulevard du Palais (2009–2010)
- Flics (2011)
- The Last Panthers (2015)
- Sam (2016–2023)
- Braquo (2016)
- La Mante (2017)
- Maroni, les fantômes du fleuve (2018)
- Prise au piège (2019)
- Inhuman Resources (2020)
- Lupin (2021)
- Alex Hugo (2021)
- Thirty Coffins Island (2021)
