= Stéphane Caillard =

French actress (born 1988)

- Born: Stéphane Caillard; 1 October 1988 (age 37); Marseille, France
- Education: INSAS Brussels and Asnières Studio-Theatre
- Occupation: Actress
- Years active: 1999–present
- Known for: Marseille TV Series

Stéphane Caillard (born 1 October 1988 in Marseille, France) is a French film and television actress. Since 1999, she has appeared in various films and drama series on French television. In 2004, she played Camille Dassin, the daughter of Richard Bohringer's character in the TV series Doctor Dassin. In 2025 she played Leo in the Netflix film, Ad Vitam.

== Biography ==
Caillard attended acting classes at INSAS Brussels and studied at the Asnières Studio-Theatre. In 2011, she appeared in Les Lyonnais, a film directed by Olivier Marchal. In 2012, she joined the Compagnie du Boramar in Collioure, with which she appeared in two plays by Molière. She won her first major role in 2015, playing Alma, one of the three heroines in the series La Vie devant elles, and then Julia Taro, in the TV series Marseille.

== Filmography ==
=== Film ===
| Year | Title | Role |
|---|---|---|
| 2006 | C'est beau une ville la nuit | |
| 2010 | Le temps de la kermesse est terminé | Alex Keller |
| 2011 | Les Lyonnais | Janou jeune |
| 2011 | Rabat | Julie |
| 2015 | Premiers Crus | Cécile |
| 2016 | Juillet Août | Louise |
| 2016 | Bastille Day (2016 film) | Béatrice |
| 2017 | Chez nous | Victoire Vasseur |
| 2019 | Get In | Chlóe |
| 2025 | Ad Vitam | Leo |

=== Television ===
| Year | Title | Role |
|---|---|---|
| 1999 | La maison d'Alexina | Momo |
| 2010 | Les petite meutres d'Agatha Christie: Le chat et les souris | Annabelle de Lussac |
| 2011 | A Gang Story | young Janou |
| 2013 | Les petite meutres d'Agatha Christie: Jeux de glaces | Juliette |
| 2014 | Borgia | Charlotte d'Albret |
| 2015, 2017 | La Vie devant elles (seasons 1 and 2) | Alma |
| 2015 | Neuf Jours en hiver | Frédérique |
| 2016 | Marseille | Julia Taro |
| 2018 | Genius | Geneviève Aliquot |
| 2019 | War of the Worlds | Chloe Dumont |
