= The Disintegration =

2011 French film

- Directed by: Philippe Faucon
- Written by: Philippe Faucon; Éric Nebot; Mohamed Sifaoui
- Starring: Rashid Debbouze
- Cinematography: Laurent Fénart
- Edited by: Sophie Mandonnet
- Music by: Benoît Schlosberg
- Release date: 2011
- Countries: France; Belgium
- Language: French

The Disintegration (French: La Désintégration) is a 2011 French-Belgian drama film co-written and directed by Philippe Faucon. The film premiered out of competition at the 68th edition of the Venice Film Festival. The title is "a play on words combining disintegration with the negation of integration".

== Plot ==
Djamel, a middle-aged young man, meets three young well acquainted boys and tries to manipulate their thoughts against society.

== Cast ==
- Rashid Debbouze as Ali Aousi
- Kamel Laadaili as Rachid Aousi
- Yassine Azzouz as Djamel
- Ymanol Perset as Hamza
- Christian Mazzuchini as Chef entrepôt Ali
