= Gidon Kremer =

Latvian violinist (born 1947)

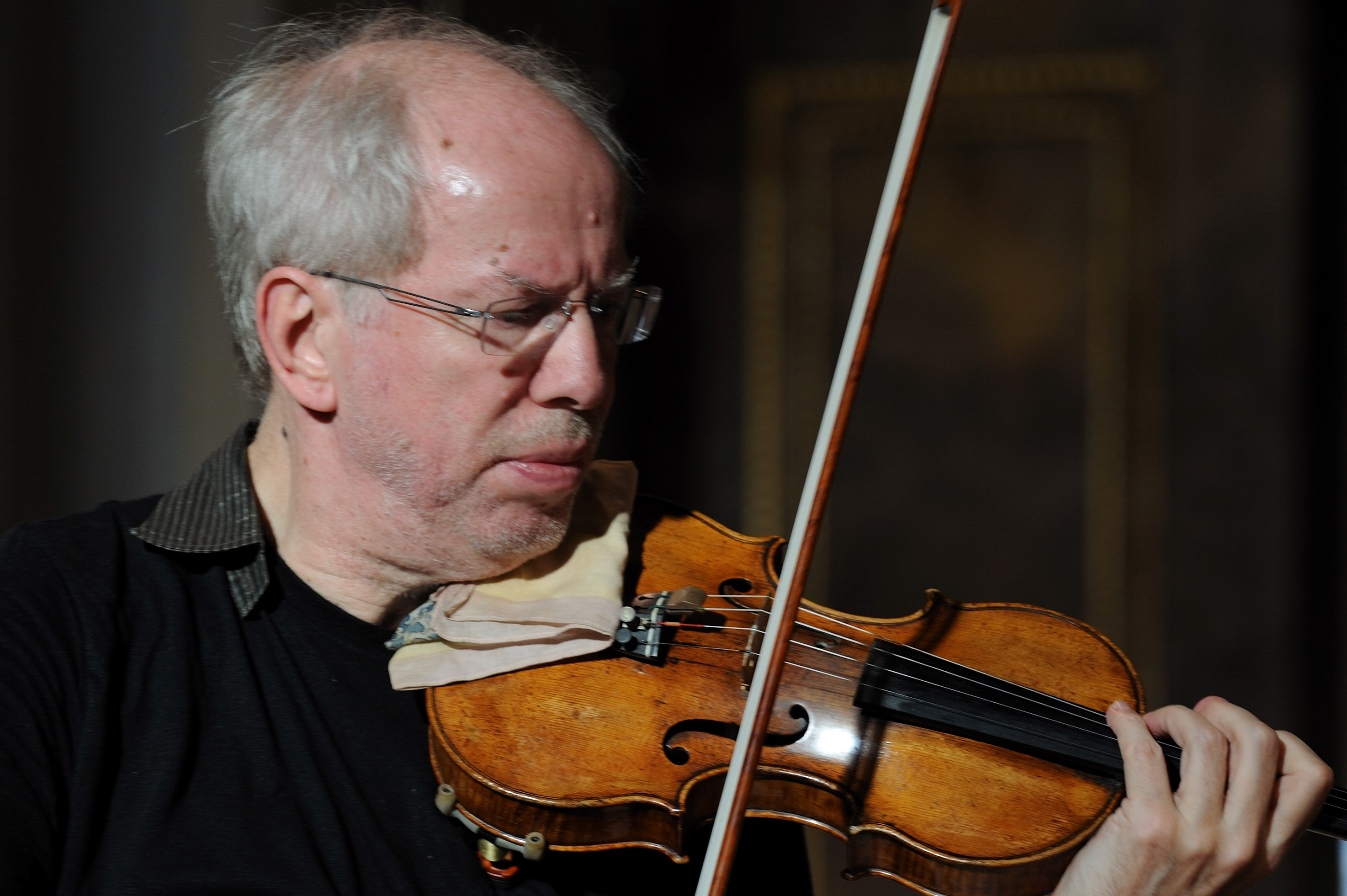
- Kremer in 2008
- Born: 27 February 1947 (age 79); Riga, Latvian SSR, USSR
- Education: Riga School of Music; Moscow Conservatory
- Occupation: Classical violinist
- Organizations: Lockenhaus Chamber Music Festival; Kremerata Baltica
- Children: Angie Kremer
- Awards: Pour le Mérite for Sciences and Arts; Praemium Imperiale
- Website: www.gidonkremer.net

Gidon Markusovich Kremer (Russian: Гидон Маркусович Кремер, Latvian: Gidons Krēmers; born 27 February 1947) is a Latvian-German classical violinist, artistic director, and founder of Kremerata Baltica.

== Life and career ==
Gidon Kremer was born in Riga. His father was Jewish and had survived the Holocaust. His mother had German-Swedish origins. His maternal grandfather Karl Brückner was a well-known musicologist and violinist in Riga. He is married to the photographer Alexandra Kremer-Khomassouridze.

The boy began playing the violin at the age of four, receiving instruction from his father and his grandfather, who were both professional violinists. He went on to study at the Riga School of Music, where his teacher was mainly Voldemar Sturestep (Voldemārs Stūresteps). From 1965, Kremer studied with David Oistrakh at the Moscow Conservatory. In 1967, he won third prize at the Queen Elisabeth Music Competition in Brussels. In 1969, he won second prize at the Montreal International Violin Competition (shared with Oleh Krysa), followed by first prize at the Paganini Competition in Genoa, and first prize again in 1970 at the International Tchaikovsky Competition in Moscow.

Kremer's first concert in the West was in Vienna's Musikverein in November 1970, in three concerts with Thomas Schippers and the Vienna Symphony, in which he played Elgar's Violin Concerto.

In 1980, he left the USSR and settled in Germany, obtaining also German citizenship. In 1981, Kremer founded a chamber music festival in Lockenhaus, Austria, with a focus on new and unconventional programming, serving as artistic director for 30 years until 2011.

In 1997, Kremer founded the Kremerata Baltica chamber orchestra, composed of young players from the Baltic region. He was also among the artistic directors of the festival "Art Projekt 92" in Munich and is director of the Musiksommer Gstaad festival (1996/97) and Basel ("les musiques") in Switzerland. In 2007–2008, he and Kremerata Baltica toured with the classical musical comedy duo Igudesman & Joo. He also made regular appearances at the Verbier Festival until 2011, when he publicly criticised the perceived 'star culture' aspect of the festival and withdrew from the festival.

He has performed works by Astor Piazzolla (in the Hommage à Piazzolla recordings), George Enescu, Alban Berg, Dmitri Shostakovich, Béla Bartók, Philip Glass, Alfred Schnittke, Victor Kissine, Mieczysław Weinberg, Arthur Lourié and John Adams. He also performed works by Leonid Desyatnikov, Alexander Raskatov, Alexander Vustin, Lera Auerbach, Pēteris Vasks, Arvo Pärt, Victoria Poleva, Valentyn Sylvestrov, and Stevan Kovacs Tickmayer. Among the many composers who have dedicated works to him are Sofia Gubaidulina (Offertorium), Luigi Nono (La lontananza nostalgica utopica futura), Alfred Schnittke, Giya Kancheli, and Victor Kissine.

His partners in performance include Valery Afanassiev, Martha Argerich, Mikhail Pletnev, Oleg Maisenberg, Vadim Sakharov, Mischa Maisky, Yo-Yo Ma, Clemens Hagen, Giedrė Dirvanauskaitė, Yuri Bashmet, Kim Kashkashian, Thomas Zehetmair, Tatiana Grindenko, and Per Arne Glorvigen. Over the course of his career, Kremer has appeared with a wide range of conductors, including Leonard Bernstein, Herbert von Karajan, Nikolaus Harnoncourt, Claudio Abbado, Riccardo Muti, Mstislav Rostropovich, Kent Nagano, Christoph Eschenbach, Andrey Boreyko, Seiji Ozawa, Simon Rattle and Nayden Todorov.

He has a large discography on the Deutsche Grammophon label, for which he has recorded since 1978. He has also recorded for Philips Records, EMI, Decca Records, ECM and Nonesuch Records. Celebrating Kremer's 70th birthday (27 February 2017), on 14 October 2016 Deutsche Grammophon released a box set of all the concerto recordings he had made for the label. ECM Records marked the occasion with a new album of all of Mieczysław Weinberg's chamber symphonies, released in January 2017, which he recorded with Kremerata Baltica.

In other media, Kremer played Paganini in Peter Schamoni's 1983 film Frühlingssinfonie ("Spring Symphony") and was the music director of the film Le joueur de violon by Charles Van Damme.

Kremer is the author of four books on music, including Fragments of Childhood (Kindheitsplitter) and Letters to a Young Pianist (2013).

== Honours and awards ==
- Pour le Mérite for Sciences and Arts (2016, Germany)
- Praemium Imperiale award (2016, Japan)
- Grammy Award nomination in 2015 for recording “Mieczysław Weinberg” (ECM New Series, 2014) in the category of Classical Music: Best Classical Compendium
- Una Vita Nella Musica – Artur Rubinstein Prize from Venice in 2011
- Grande Ufficiale Ordine al Merito della Repubblica Italiana (23 December 2011, Italy)
- Lifetime Achievement Award of the Istanbul Music Festival in 2010
- Rolf Schock Prize for the Musical Arts from Stockholm in 2008
- Saeculum Glashütte Original MusikFestspielPreis from Dresden in 2007
- Grammy Award in 2002 for recording “After Mozart” (Nonesuch, 2001) in the category of Classical Music: Best Small Ensemble Performance
- ECHO Klassik prize in 2002 for recording “After Mozart” (Nonesuch, 2001)
- IMC-UNESCO International Music Prize (2001, performers category, jointly awarded to Oumou Sangaré)
- Lithuanian Great Duke Gediminas Medal (2000, Lithuania)
- Triumph Prize 2000 (Moscow)
- Latvian Great Music Award (1995, 2004, Latvia)
- Officer of the Order of the Three Stars (12 March 1997, Latvia)
- Baltic Assembly Prize for Literature, the Arts and Science (1997)
- Léonie Sonning Music Prize (1989, Denmark)
- Ernst von Siemens Music Prize (1982)
- International Tchaikovsky Competition (first prize, 1970, Moscow)
- Paganini Competition (first prize, 1969, Genoa)
- Montreal International Violin Competition (second prize, 1969, Montreal)
- Queen Elisabeth Music Competition (third prize, 1967, Brussels)

== Sources ==
- Apinis, Pēteris (2006). A Hundred Great Latvians. Riga: Nacionālais apgāds. ISBN 978-9984-26-288-8. OCLC 238892134.
