= Fatima (2015 film) =

2015 film

- Film poster
- Directed by: Philippe Faucon
- Screenplay by: Philippe Faucon; Mustapha Kharmoudi (script consultant); Aziza Boudjellal (script consultant); Yasmina Nini-Faucon (script consultant)
- Based on: Prière à la lune and Enfin, je peux marcher seule by Fatima Elayoubi
- Produced by: Philippe Faucon (fr) Serge Noël
- Starring: Soria Zeroual; Zita Hanrot; Kenza Noah Aïche
- Cinematography: Laurent Fenart
- Edited by: Sophie Mandonnet
- Music by: Robert Marcel Lepage
- Distributed by: Pyramide Distribution
- Release dates: 20 May 2015 (Cannes); 7 October 2015 (France)
- Running time: 79 minutes
- Countries: France; Canada
- Languages: French; Arabic
- Budget: € 2.6 million

Fatima is a 2015 French-Canadian drama film directed by Philippe Faucon. It was screened in the Directors' Fortnight section at the 2015 Cannes Film Festival. It won the Prix Louis-Delluc for Best Film in December 2015. It received four nominations at the 41st César Awards and won Best Film, Most Promising Actress and Best Adaptation.

== Cast ==
- Soria Zeroual as Fatima
- Zita Hanrot as Nesrine
- Kenza Noah Aïche as Souad
- Chawki Amari as Father
- Dalila Bencherif as Leila
- Edith Saulnier as Séverine

== Reception ==
=== Critical reception ===
On review aggregator website Rotten Tomatoes, the film holds an approval rating of 84% based on 25 reviews, and an average rating of 6.8/10. On Metacritic, the film has a weighted average score of 69 out of 100, based on 9 critics, indicating "generally favorable reviews".

=== Accolades ===
Award / Film Festival	Category	Recipients and nominees	Result
César Awards	Best Film		Won
César Awards	Best Actress	Soria Zeroual	Nominated
César Awards	Most Promising Actress	Zita Hanrot	Won
César Awards	Best Adaptation	Philippe Faucon	Won
French Syndicate of Cinema Critics	Best French Film		Won
Louis Delluc Prize	Best Film		Won
Lumière Awards	Best Screenplay	Philippe Faucon	Won
Prix Jacques Prévert du Scénario	Best Adaptation	Philippe Faucon	Nominated
