= Paul Sanchez est revenu! =

- French: Paul Sanchez est revenu!
- Directed by: Patricia Mazuy
- Screenplay by: Patricia Mazuy; Yves Thomas
- Produced by: Patrick Sobelman
- Starring: Laurent Lafitte; Zita Hanrot; Idir Chender
- Cinematography: Frédéric Noirhomme
- Edited by: Mathilde Muyard
- Music by: John Cale
- Production company: Ex nihilo
- Release date: 18 July 2018 (France)
- Country: France
- Language: French

Paul Sanchez est revenu! is a French film directed by Patricia Mazuy, from a screenplay by Mazuy and Yves Thomas. It stars Laurent Lafitte, Zita Hanrot and Idir Chender. It was released on 18 July 2018. Welsh musician John Cale, who previously collaborated with Mazuy on The King's Daughters (2000) and Sport de filles (2011), composed the original music score.

== Plot ==
February 2017. In Roquebrune-sur-Argens, people report to Gendarmerie Nationale about the return of Paul Sanchez, who fled from Cahors four years ago after having committed a severe crime. This story even makes a local journal reporter, Yohann Poulain, forget the chief gendarme is driving a costly Porsche unlawfully confiscated from Johnny Depp, and investigate this case instead. People never forgot about Paul Sanchez, who had killed his wife Violette with four children (Florent, Baptiste, Laura, and Marie) on 19 September 2006 in Cahors and had their corpses burned for an unknown reason.

Paul Sanchez contacts Yohann Poulain via e-mail. For that reason, the reporter is contacted by a female gendarme named Marion Boulicaut who participates in phone calls with Sanchez upon his request. Sanchez wants somebody to listen to him, and tells her about the tyrant inside his head, who orders him to kill people.

Later on, while hiking in the mountains in her leisure time, Marion tracks Sanchez and ties him up. Having confessed at first, he later begins insisting he is not Sanchez, but Didier Gérard, pool engineer. Marion takes his spit for DNA analysis and leaves him tied up at a garden shed, without food and water.

Investigating Didier Gérard, Marion comes to the conclusion that Gérard has gone mad, and is going to kill his own wife and three children. She rushes towards his wife, who has been reporting to gendarmes about Gérard's loss for several days. While on the premises, the spouses meet and Marion eliminates Gérard, who is attempting to kill his wife.

Yohann Poulain publishes his book titled Paul Sanchez est revenu! While being interviewed on TV, he announces that he is looking for Marion, who left her service with Gendarmerie Nationale after the events, and fled away from Roquebrune-sur-Argens.

== Production ==
The film was announced in February 2017 with SBS as a distributor. Principal photography began in February 2017 in Roquebrune-sur-Argens and was completed by 31 March 2017.
