= Amin (film) =

2018 film directed by Philippe Faucon

- Film poster
- Directed by: Philippe Faucon
- Screenplay by: Philippe Faucon; Mustapha Kharmoudi; Yasmina Nini-Faucon
- Produced by: Olivier Père
- Starring: Emmanuelle Devos; Moustapha Mbengue
- Cinematography: Laurent Fénart
- Edited by: Sophie Mandonnet
- Music by: Amine Bouhafa
- Production company: Istiqlal Films
- Distributed by: Pyramide Distribution
- Release date: 15 May 2018 (Cannes)
- Running time: 91 minutes
- Country: France
- Language: French
- Budget: $4 million
- Box office: $396.000

Amin is a 2018 French drama film directed by Philippe Faucon. It was selected to screen in the Directors' Fortnight section at the 2018 Cannes Film Festival.

== Cast ==
- Moustapha Mbengue: Amin Sow
- Emmanuelle Devos: Gabrielle
- Mareme N'Diaye: Aïcha
- Noureddine Benallouche: Abdelaziz
- Moustapha Naham: Ousmane
- Jalal Quarriwa: Sabri
- Émilie Gavois-Kahn: The director
- Ouidad Elma: Selima
- Fantine Harduin: Célia
- Loubna Abidar: The waitress
