= Get In (film) =

2019 film by Olivier Abbou

- Theatrical release poster
- French: Furie
- Directed by: Olivier Abbou
- Screenplay by: Aurélien Molas; Olivier Abbou
- Story by: Aurélien Molas
- Produced by: Léonard Glowinski; Jean-Christophe Barret
- Starring: Adama Niane; Stéphane Caillard; Paul Hamy; Eddy Leduc; Marie Bourin; Hubert Delattre
- Cinematography: Laurent Tangy
- Edited by: Benjamin Favreul
- Music by: Clément Téry
- Production companies: 22h22; APC; Umedia; Nexus Factory; Chaocorp Cinéma; Ciné@
- Distributed by: New Story
- Release dates: 7 September 2019 (L'Étrange Festival); 6 November 2019 (France)
- Running time: 97 minutes
- Country: France
- Language: French

Get In (French: Furie) is a 2019 French horror thriller film written and directed by Olivier Abbou. The film stars Adama Niane, Stéphane Caillard and Paul Hamy in the lead roles. It was released in France on 6 November 2019 and received positive reviews from critics. It was later released on Netflix on 1 May 2020.

== Plot ==
Upon returning home from their motor-homing vacation, Paul Diallo, his wife Chloé (Stéphane Caillard), and their son Louis find their house occupied by squatters who refuse to leave, claiming that it is in fact their house.

It is soon revealed that the squatters are Sabrina Bolso (the family's regular babysitter) and her partner Eric, who had come to an informal agreement with the family to stay in their home whilst they were on holiday. With all parties having signed a document agreeing to the unspecific occupancy of the house, the police claim the family have no legal right to formally evict them, and could be accused of assault should they enforce eviction themselves. Defeated, the family resort to living from their motorhome in an abandoned campsite owned by the insouciant Mickey, an old school-friend of Chloé.

After unhelpful meetings with their solicitor, and hopes of regaining their home dwindling with delayed court dates, Paul grows frustrated and seeks comfort in Mickey and his carefree friends. Mickey tells Paul he believes Paul is "choosing to be a victim" and encourages him to start taking charge of his life. Following several wild late-night parties out with Mickey, Paul grows accustomed to their anarchic, often male-chauvinistic, way of life, and follows their advice to take back control through severe means. In an attempt to intimidate, he permanently parks the motorhome in their backyard, claiming the squatters can't legally force them to leave either, as they are still tenants too.

Tension between Paul and Chloé mounts right away. At school, where Paul teaches teenagers history, the camera draws attention to a young couple in class who is mixed much like Paul and Chloé are. A discussion of John Locke’s ideas on property leads the black male student of the couple, Kevin, to proclaim that a robbery is the fault of the robbed for being weak and insufficiently masculine. Paul is incensed and immediately dismisses the boy who storms out bemoaning Paul for being an “Oreo” —- explained later as “black on the outside; white on the inside.”

Growing worried for her husband's stability, Chloé warns Mickey to stay away from Paul - wherein it is revealed that the pair previously shared an intimate relationship, and likely had an affair whilst Paul and Chloé have been married. However, Mickey takes Paul out one last time. Paul becomes disgusted and overwhelmed when, in a drunken, drug-fueled state, he accepts oral sex from a strange woman at a party. Whilst she goes down on him in a bathroom stall he begins to trip. The experience seems positive at first but Paul ultimately finds her vampire fangs too much and runs out of the club.

There in the club parking lot Paul finds none other than Kevin being beaten unrecognizable by Mickey and his gang armed with bats and brass knuckles. Off to the side his girlfriend is being restrained, forced to watch with no recourse, screaming for help. Upon noticing Paul the girl cries out in terror “Mr. Diallo! Help us Mr. Diallo! Please help us!” Franck tries to assuage Paul's concerns and the camera fades to black. It then fades to Paul laboriously walking down the side of some road when Mickey and Franck spot him and stop their truck alongside him. Paul effectively tells Mickey to leave him alone and Mickey strikes him and drives off laughing.

Later that same night, Paul and Chloé are shocked to see Mickey and his friends storm the house, armed with Molotov cocktails and baseball bats. When confronted by Paul, Mickey tells him "I'll take your house, as you can't do it yourself," and decides to burn the entire house. Mickey viciously beats Eric to a bloody pulp before he and his friends attack Paul and Chloé.

As Paul retains consciousness, he watches helplessly as Mickey's friends destroy the family's belongings. Aware that Paul won't fight back, Mickey mounts and strips the semi-conscious, bloodied Chloé - while his friends torture Sabrina and Eric by forcibly vacuum packing them, slowly suffocating them. Paul manages to hide Chloé in a closet, and sneaks outside to the motorhome, wherein he drives into the side of the house, knocking down a few of Mickey's friends. Managing to ambush Franck from under the motorhome, Paul brutally smashes his skull with a brick.

Now faced only with Mickey, he opens the RVs cooking gas valve, lures him inside the motorhome, and throws a Molotov cocktail at the vehicle, causing it to explode. Miraculously, though weak and burned, Mickey survives and attacks Paul. Chloé is able to incapacitate him using a pressure washer, before Paul mercilessly beats him with a baseball bat. As Paul looks down at Mickey's bloodied face, he sees a flash of his own face, before the body briefly springs back to life to utter, "You got your house back.", before falling back down. The couple return to the burning house to rescue Sabrina, only for Paul to glance back at Mickey's body to find he has vanished.

Some time later, the family has successfully moved back into what remains of their home. After putting Louis to bed, the couple (both visually bruised and scarred) engage in passionate sex. Neither Mickey's ultimate whereabouts, nor Kevin and his girlfriend's ultimate well-being are ever addressed.

== Cast ==
- Adama Niane as Paul Diallo
- Stéphane Caillard as Chloé Diallo
- Paul Hamy as Mickey
- Matthieu Kacou as Louis Diallo
- Marie Bourin as Sabrina Bolso
- Hubert Delattre as Eric Bolso
- Coline Beal as La rousse
- Eddy Leduc as Franck
- Jacques Herlin as Le juge

== Critical reception ==
Writing for Movie Nation, Roger Moore called the movie "a taut, troubling and topical French thriller". Albert Nowicki of His Name Is Death opined that the film was inspired by 1970s psychological thrillers, most notably Straw Dogs. He also praised the dynamics between the two central characters portrayed by Paul Hamy and Adama Niane.
