= Victor Kissine =

Russian-born classical composer (born 1953)

- Виктор Кисин
- Born: 15 March 1953; Leningrad, Soviet Union
- Occupations: Composer; Musicologist
- Organizations: INSAS; Conservatoire royal de Mons

Victor Kissine (Russian: Виктор Романович Кисин; born 15 March 1953) is a Russian-born Belgian classical composer and academic teacher.

== Biography ==
Kissine was born in Leningrad on 15 March 1953. He studied musicology at the Rimsky-Korsakov Saint Petersburg State Conservatory with Mikhail Druskin, among others, completing a PhD.

He has been a resident of Belgium from 1990, working as professor of musical analysis and orchestration at INSAS and at the Conservatoire royal de Mons.

Kissine has composed two operas and ballets, orchestral and concertante works including three violin concertos, chamber music, choral and vocal music, and film scores. His compositions have been premiered at venues including Carnegie Hall and Lincoln Center in New York City, the Komische Oper Berlin, the Salzburg Festival and the Kammermusikfest Lockenhaus; he has collaborated with orchestras including the Berlin Philharmonic, the San Francisco Symphony, Konzerthausorchester Berlin and the Belgian National Orchestra. He has served as a juror of international competitions such as the 2026 Queen Elisabeth Competition in Brussels. One of his compositions, Caprice, was written for the 2012 violin competition..

== Award ==
Kissine was named a Grand Officier of the Belgian Order of Leopold on 15 November 2020. A 2011 recording of his second piano trio, Zerkalo, alongside Tchaikovsky's Piano Trio, with violinist Gidon Kremer, cellist Giedrė Dirvanauskaitė and pianist Khatia Buniatishvili, received the Preis der deutschen Schallplattenkritik.
