= SK1 (film) =

- Film poster
- Directed by: Frédéric Tellier
- Written by: David Oelhoffen; Frédéric Tellier
- Produced by: Julien Leclercq; Julien Madon; Julien Deris; Franck Elbase; David Gauquie; Nicolas Lesage; Etienne Mallet
- Starring: Raphaël Personnaz; Nathalie Baye; Olivier Gourmet; Michel Vuillermoz
- Cinematography: Mathias Boucard
- Edited by: Mickael Dumontier
- Music by: Christophe La Pinta; Frédéric Tellier
- Production companies: Labyrinthe Films; Movie Pictures; France 3 Cinéma; Cinéfrance 1888; SND Films; Mondatta Films; Bethsabée Mucho
- Distributed by: SND
- Release dates: 25 August 2014 (Angoulême); 7 January 2015 (France)
- Running time: 120 minutes
- Country: France
- Language: French
- Budget: $5.6 million
- Box office: $2.6 million

SK1 (French: L'Affaire SK1), known in the US as Serial Killer 1, is a 2014 French thriller drama film directed by Frédéric Tellier. The term "SK1" is a codename given by the police to the first serial killer who was identified and arrested via DNA analysis in France.

== Plot ==
The film chronicles the hunt and trial of a 1990s serial killer, dubbed "The Beast of the Bastille".

== Synopsis ==
The film is set in Paris in 1991. It is based on the story of Franck Magne, a young inspector starting out in the Criminal Investigation Department at 36 quai des Orfèvres, in the Crime Squad. His first case deals with the murder of a young woman. His investigation leads him to study similar cases that he is the only one to link together. He is quickly confronted by the reality of police investigation work: the lack of equipment, bureaucracy... For 8 years, obsessed by this investigation, he hunts the serial killer that no one else believes exists. As a decade goes by, the victims multiply and leads become muddled. The gap between the brutal murders grows shorter. Franck Magne hunts down the killer that begins to emerge, so as to stop him. The inspector from the Crime Squad becomes the architect of the most complex and vast investigation ever undertaken by the French Criminal Investigation Department. During it, Magne crosses paths with Frédérique Pons, a lawyer determined to understand the destiny of the man hidden behind the killer. The film covers 10 years of investigation, amongst cops, judges, forensic policemen, and lawyers who will all be affected by this case that became the "Guy Georges, the killer of Eastern Paris" case.

== Cast ==
- Raphaël Personnaz as Franck Magne (Charlie)
- Nathalie Baye as Frédérique Pons
- Olivier Gourmet as Bougon
- Michel Vuillermoz as Carbonnel
- Adama Niane as Guy Georges
- Christa Théret as Elisabeth Ortega
- Thierry Neuvic as Jensen
- William Nadylam as the advocat of Guy Georges
- Marianne Denicourt as Martine Monteil
- Annie Mercier as Jeanne Morin
- Chloë Stéfani as Corinne
- Benjamin Lavernhe as Frédéric Brunet

== Accolades ==
| Award / Film Festival | Category | Recipients and nominees | Result |
|---|---|---|---|
| César Awards | Best Adaptation | David Oelhoffen and Frédéric Tellier | Nominated |
| César Awards | Best First Feature Film | | Nominated |
| Lumière Awards | Best Cinematography | Matias Boucard | Nominated |
| Prix Jacques Prévert du Scénario | Best Adaptation | | Won |

== See also ==
- List of French films of 2014
