= The Angry Brigade (play) =

2014 play by James Graham

The Angry Brigade is 2014 play by the British playwright James Graham, centred on the Angry Brigade anarchist group. It was announced in January 2014. It opened at the Theatre Royal, Plymouth on 18 September 2014 before touring to the Oxford Playhouse, Warwick Arts Centre and Watford Palace Theatre between 8 and 25 October 2014. The production was directed by James Grieve and a four-person cast of Patsy Ferran, Scarlett Alice Johnson, Harry Melling and Felix Scott.
