= Ad Vitam (film) =

French action drama film

- Release poster
- Directed by: Rodolphe Lauga
- Screenplay by: Rodolphe Lauga; David Corona; Guillaume Canet
- Produced by: Guillaume Canet; Jean Cottin
- Starring: Guillaume Canet; Stéphane Caillard
- Production company: Cabanes Productions
- Distributed by: Netflix
- Release date: January 10, 2025
- Running time: 98 minutes
- Country: France
- Language: French

Ad Vitam is a 2025 French action thriller film directed by Rodolphe Lauga and starring Guillaume Canet, who also co-wrote the film with Lauga and David Corona. It was released globally on Netflix on 10 January 2025.

== Premise ==
A former GIGN operator, dismissed from his job after a tragic accident, gets mixed in a dangerous conspiracy when his pregnant wife is kidnapped.

== Cast ==
- Guillaume Canet as Franck Lazareff
- Stéphane Caillard as Léo
- Nassim Lyes as Ben
- Zita Hanrot as Manon
- Alexis Manenti as Nico

== Production ==
The film is directed by Rodolphe Lauga, who co-wrote it with Guillaume Canet and David Corona. Canet is a producer alongside Jean Cottin for Cabanes Productions. Canet also has a starring role. Appearing alongside him in the cast are Stéphane Caillard, Nassim Lyes, Zita Hanrot and Alexis Manenti.

Principal photography took place in Paris in April 2024. Filming continued in Paris and Versailles into June 2024.

== Release ==
It was released on Netflix on 10 January 2025.

== Reception ==
On the review aggregator website Rotten Tomatoes, 42% of 12 critics' reviews are positive, with an average rating of 4.8/10. Elisabeth Vincentelli in The New York Times criticised the pacing of the film, describing a long flashback sequence that may be designed to provide "emotional weight, but it only creates belly fat". Dennis Harvey for Variety said it was "entertaining" and certainly "not dull", but became increasingly hard to take seriously, as the script veers between gritty thriller terrain to the kind of overscaled set-pieces more apt for James Bond". Harvey felt that the different sections "failure to gel" is “exacerbated by an awkward story structure whose midsection is a long, two-part flashback".

== Viewership ==
According to data from Showlabs, Ad Vitam ranked sixth on Netflix in the United States during the week of 13–19 January 2025.
