= Guy Georges =

French serial killer (born 1962)

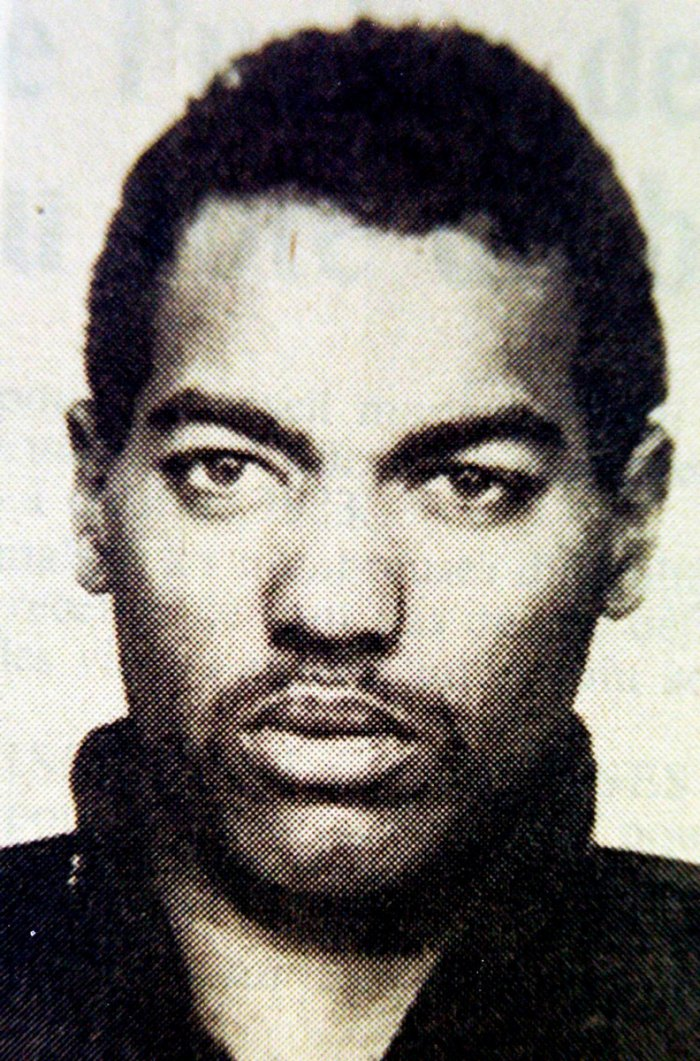
- Born: Guy Rampillon; 15 October 1962 (age 63); Vitry-le-François, France
- Other name: The Beast of the Bastille
- Status: Incarcerated
- Penalty: 22 years to life imprisonment (5 April 2001)

Details
- Victims: 7
- Span of crimes: 24 January 1991 – 16 November 1997
- Country: France
- Date apprehended: 26 March 1998

Guy Georges (born Guy Rampillon, 15 October 1962) is a French serial killer and serial rapist, dubbed le tueur de l'Est Parisien ("the East Paris killer") or the Beast of the Bastille (la bête de la Bastille). He was convicted on 5 April 2001, of murdering seven women between 1991 and 1997. He was sentenced to life in prison without the possibility of parole for 22 years.

== Background ==
Guy Georges was born Guy Rampillon on 10 or 15 October 1962 to a French mother and an African American father (George Cartwright, U.S. military cook stationed at a NATO base). His mother, Helène Rampillon, had an older son named Stéphane, fathered by a white U.S. serviceman. Stéphane was raised by Helène's parents, who refused to raise Guy because he was Helène's second child and because of the stigmatization of mixed-race children in their hometown of Angers. After six years of moving between foster homes and his mother's care, Guy became a ward of the state and was placed with the Morin family. The Morins had previously cared for another black child who was taken back by the authorities; Guy was a "replacement child." The Morins had seven biological children and 13 foster children. In 1968, Guy's surname was changed to Georges (a patronymic). Helène Rampillon moved to California with her older son, where she wanted to marry another American serviceman.

As a child, Georges began stealing from the family food store and began hunting with a knife in the forest near his home. He took on the nickname "Jo" after the character Injun Joe in The Adventures of Tom Sawyer. At age 14, he attempted to strangle his younger foster sister, Roselyne, who was mentally handicapped. His older foster sister, Christiane, testified that when he was 16 years old, Georges attempted to strangle her with an iron bar. Georges was then sent to a state orphanage. He was subsequently in and out of jail and prison for other crimes and attacks on women until his arrest for the East Paris murders. During the period he committed his crimes, he worked closely with reporters from Paris Match magazine, before eventually participating in the kidnapping of one of their photojournalists, Yan Morvan.

== Crimes ==
From 1991 to 1997, Guy Georges assaulted, tortured, raped and killed seven women in the neighbourhood of the Bastille, the Bourbon-era Parisian prison. Georges was arrested on 26 March 1998 and admitted his guilt to police. Described by psychiatrists as a "narcissistic psychopath", he was sentenced in April 2001 to life imprisonment, without the possibility of parole after 22 years.

=== Murders ===
- 24 January 1991– Pascale Escarfail, 19 (raped and murdered)
- 7 January 1994 – Catherine ("Cathy") Rocher, 27 (raped and murdered)
- 8 November 1994 – Elsa Benady, 22 (raped and murdered)
- 9 December 1994 – Agnes Nijkamp (Dutch), 32 (raped and murdered)
- 8 July 1995 – Hélène Frinking (Dutch), 27 (raped and murdered)
- 23 September 1997 – Magali Sirotti, 19 (raped and murdered)
- 16 November 1997 – Estelle Magd, 25 (raped and murdered)

=== Other crimes ===
- 1976 – Roselyne (adoptive sister), attempted strangulation
- 1978 – Christiane (adoptive sister), attempted strangulation
- February 1979 – Pascale C., attempted strangulation
- May 1980 – Jocelyne S., attacked
- May 1980 – Roselyne C., attacked, stabbed in the face
- 16 November 1981 – Nathali C., 18, raped, stabbed and left for dead
- 7 June 1982 - Violette K., raped, stabbed and strangled but escaped
- February 1984 – Pascale N., 21, raped, stabbed but escaped
- 22 April 1992 – Éléonore D., assaulted
- 13 January 1994 – Annie L., attacked
- June 1995 – Élisabeth O., assaulted
- 25 August 1995 - Mélanie B., assaulted
- October 1997 - Valérie L., assaulted

== Paris investigation ==
Matching DNA samples linked the murders of Agnes Nijkamp, Hélène Frinking, and Estelle Magd as well as the attempted rape and murder of Elisabeth Ortega. Ortega gave a description of her attacker to police which produced a composite sketch. She stated her attacker was "North African"; neither this description nor the sketch were found to resemble Georges. Anne Gautier, mother of Hélène Frinking, conducted her own "co-investigation," pressing the police to follow potential leads. Frustrated with the lack of progress in the investigation, particularly after the murders of Magali Sirotti and Estelle Magd, Gautier went to the media to inform the public that there was an unidentified serial killer in Paris. According to Gautier, "the Police Judiciaire didn't even question Hélène's neighbours until 23 months after she was killed" and "The Elisabeth Ortega identity portrait was drawn up 28 months after she was attacked, but accurate descriptions from other survivors and witnesses [in at least four other cases] were ignored."

Due to the lack of a centralized DNA database in France at the time, police had nothing to which to compare the DNA samples collected from the crime scenes. Georges was identified as the perpetrator in March 1998 after a judge ordered a manual search for a match in the DNA records of private clinics, which was a violation of typical regulations. Martine Monteil, director of the Serious Crimes Unit (brigade criminelle), stated in a 2021 documentary: "Yes, we circumvented the law, and we didn't care. We took full responsibility. The ends justifies the means." After Georges was identified, police realized Georges had been questioned about another series of murders of women in parking structures, including Catherine Rocher and Elsa Benandy.

Georges was arrested for the Paris murders and rapes on 26 March 1998 outside the Blanche metro station in the 9th arrondissement by officers on an unrelated stakeout. Georges was injured during the arrest and later claimed police beat him during his interrogation, which Monteil denied. Before his arrest, Georges' name had been leaked to the press.

Georges confessed to the murders to the police after his arrest. During the trial three years later, he initially denied having killed anyone but then admitted to the seven murders. He stated: "I will inflict pain on myself. I will never leave prison; you can live in peace. Whatever happens, I won't do it again. Even if you don't accept it, I ask for forgiveness."

== See also ==
- List of French serial killers

== In media ==
- Beast of the Bastille (Guy Georges). Format: DVD-R. Number of Discs: 1. Run Time: 50 Minutes. ISBN 1-4229-1594-8
- The Beast of the Bastille: Guy Georges, Crime & Investigation Network, 44 Minutes, Size: 318 MB, Certificate: 12 / 7pm
- SK1, 2014 French film
- La mémoire des murs, Tatiana de Rosnay.
- Les Femmes et L'Assassin (The Women and the Murderer), Netflix (2021)
