= The Taxidermist's Daughter =

2014 novel by Kate Mosse

- First edition
- Author: Kate Mosse
- Language: English
- Publisher: Orion Publishing
- Pages: 432
- ISBN: 978-1-4091-5375-7

The Taxidermist's Daughter is a 2014 novel by Kate Mosse.

== Production ==
Mosse described the novel as a "love letter" to Fishbourne, the village in which she was raised. Mosse conducted a taxidermy on a crow named Connie during research for the novel.

The novel was published by Orion Publishing in 2014.

== Reception ==
Stevie Davies praised the prose as "exceptionally lyrical" for its description of "the natural world and the suffering of its mortal creatures". The Observer's review praised the novel's descriptions of the marshlands of Fishbourne as "outstanding" and "[breathing] life into the setting". Kate Williams in The Independent praised the novel's illustrations.
