= Yan Morvan =

French photographer (1954–2024)

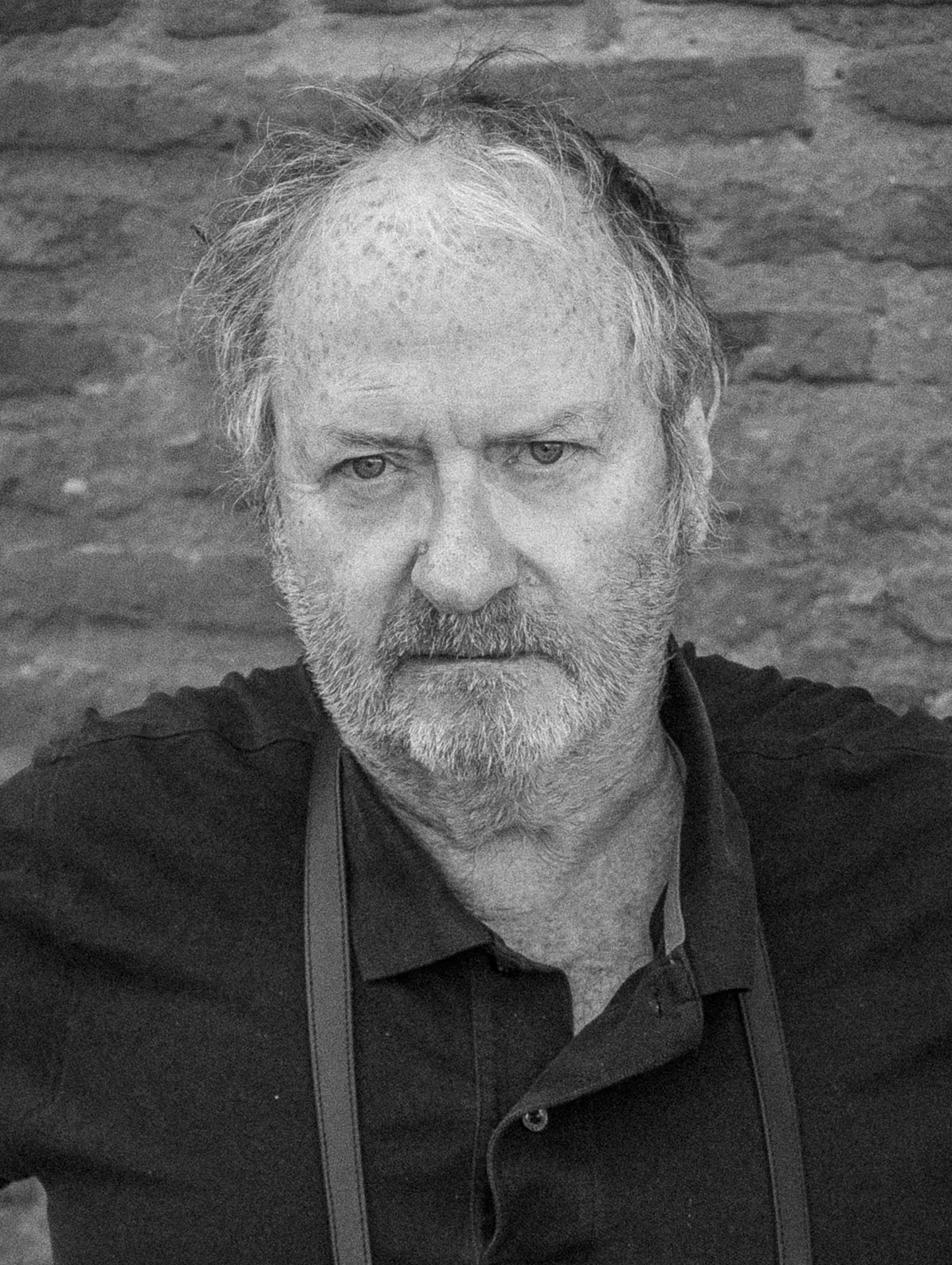
- Morvan in 2022
- Born: 4 April 1954; Paris, France
- Died: 20 September 2024 (aged 70)
- Awards: National Headliner Award (1982) National Press Photographers Association and University of Missouri (1983) Robert Capa Award (1983) World Press Photo (1984) Prix Under Fire UGC (1984)

Yan Morvan (4 April 1954 – 20 September 2024) was a French photographer, journalist, photojournalist, and author particularly recognized for his war photography and images of underground communities.

His career, which began in 1974, specialized in examining the underside of the society; his photographs depicted the lives of underground communities, such as bikers, far right and far left activists, gangs, and sex workers.

Co-director of the photojournalism section of the center for training and development of journalists in 1994, co-founder of the magazine Photographie.com in 1997, independent photojournalist from 1998, Morvan published extensively in the French and international press.

Morvan covered a number of major conflicts from 1980 and 2000 in Europe, the Middle East, and Africa. From 2005, he focused on photographic projects (Battlefields, Hexagone) and exhibited in photo festivals. Additionally he was the author of some 20 books.

== Biography ==
After his graduation in mathematics then a master's degree in cinema at the University of Vincennes, Yan Morvan turned to photography.

In 1974, he published his first photograph in the French daily newspaper Libération. Freelance writer for the Fotolib agency, he was the first to document the life of rockers and bands. His first book, Le Cuir et Le Baston, published by Simoen editors, is a sociological work on the aspiration of generation of teenagers obsessed by the American rock 'n' roll culture . His style, as close as possible to reality, testifies, without judgment to the marginal lives of this generation under American influence.

In February 1978, he joined the teams of French magazine Paris Match, then Figaro Magazine, followed by the Gamma agency in 1979 and Sipa between 1980 and 1988.

=== 1980s ===
Alternating press reports and long formats coverage, Yan Morvan found himself in London with the rise of the Punk movement in 1980. He then left for Bangkok photographing the Cambodian refugees fleeing the Khmer there. Yan and his camera witnessed the sexual slavery of Thai peasants. The subsequent report appeared in Photo magazine.

In July 1980, he joined the Sipa Agency team, gradually asserting himself through a few subjects: Turkey, the Iran-Iraq war, the Northern Irish conflict as well as Lady Diana's wedding.

The intervention of the Israeli army in Lebanon in June 1982 marked the start of Operation Peace in Galilee. Yan Morvan was dispatched there by the Sipa agency for Newsweek and would remain for four years in Lebanon. His treatment of the conflict is without bias; he wishes to faithfully reproduce the episodes of this major conflict of the 1980s. He decides to produce a poignant report in the Linhof Technika 4 x 5 large format camera along the Green Line, this no man's land which separates Beirut and the belligerents. There, he photographs combatants, civilians and ruins. This exceptional photographic, historical and ethnological work almost cost him his life on numerous occasions. His photographic equipment was heavy and ill-suited to this type of terrain, but allowed the world to fully bear witness to the situation. He won two World Press Photo and a mention for the Robert Capa Award.

Yan Morvan covered conflicts for the international press (Uganda, Mozambique, Rwanda, Afghanistan, Cambodia, Iraq, until Bosnia in 1999) and substantive topics on gangs, the amplification of the social divide. He was taken hostage and tortured for three weeks by serial killer Guy Georges in Paris.

=== 1990s ===
In the 1990s, Yan Morvan created with Patrick Frilet the EMI-CFD and, with Jean-François Bauret and Didier de Fays, the first French photography magazine on the internet: Photographie.com as well as the Talent Award. He also collaborated with Thierry Ardisson from the beginning of the magazine Entrevue and the rise of the chic porn industry.

=== 2000s ===
The 2000s began with the release of the book Gang, Editions Marval, a retrospective of thirty years of photographic work. In 2004, the Battlefields project began, which lasted ten years. Equipped with a 20x25 Deardorff camera, Yan Morvan photographs the battlefields in France, Europe, America, Asia, Africa and the Pacific Ocean. In 2015, a 660-page book was published by Photosyntheses editions and brought together 250 battlefields photographed and commented by Yan Morvan. The series is exhibited at the Rencontres de la photographie d'Arles in 2016 and will enter the collection of the French Army Museum.

=== 2010s ===
In 2012 and 2016, two books, Gang Story and Blousons Noirs, were published by Éditions La Manufacture de livres, testimonies to the evolution of gangs, then Yan Morvan undertook the Hexagone project with photographer Éric Bouvet. He crisscrossed France in order to portray the French with his camera.

The following year, Bobby Sands (ed. André Frère) was released, which won the Hip Prize and was exhibited at Visa pour l'image, Les Années de fer (ed. Serious Publishing) and Battlefield, an American version of Champs de guerre published by Abbeville. The following year will be marked by his first solo exhibition at Paris Photo (Sit Down gallery).

=== 2020s ===
In 2020, Yan Morvan exhibits, as part of the Rencontres d'Arles, an introduction to the Hexagone project, publishes his story on the Pigalle of the 1990s (ed. La Manufacture de livres) and presented at the Auer Photo Foundation in Geneva.

2021 marked the anniversary of 1981, a photographic coverage of the election of François Mitterrand which will give rise to several exhibitions (Marlat gallery, Initial Labo, place de la Bastille and the François-Mitterrand Institute). For the 50 years of the Larzac movement, a book published by La Manufacture de livres is published in August, accompanied by an exhibition. It also includes the collection of artists edited by Agnès b.

Yan Morvan later worked with the Batt Coop collective on the publication of his archives in the form of bimonthly photographic chronicles, including Hexagone or America, which he photographed for forty years, and the social divide of the 1990s.

=== Education ===
Yan Morvan was a trainer at the National School of Photography in Arles, then at the CFD (responsible for the photo course with Patrick Frilet from 1991), and then at the Training and Development Center for Journalists.

=== Death ===
Morvan died of skin cancer on 20 September 2024, at the age of 70.

== Exhibitions ==
Yan Morvan exhibited in several photo festivals and in a selection of art galleries.

In 1980, he exhibited at the Canon Gallery in Geneva.

In 1986, he was selected by the Walker Art Center in Minneapolis for a retrospective on photojournalism. In the same year, he presented his Lebanon series at the Ancient Theater during the Rencontres de la photographie d'Arles. The photos are then presented at the Nei Liicht foto-galerie, in Luxembourg. In 1987, he participated in the group exhibition Eyewitness, 30 years of World Press, at the International Center of Photography, in New York.

In 2000, his series of portraits of young road victims, commissioned by the National Contemporary Art Fund, was exhibited at the Visa pour l'image international photojournalism festival. From 8 July to 29 September, the Fnac photographic collection is holding a collective exhibition in the archdiocese's palace on the occasion of the Rencontres de la photographie d'Arles. The curation is entrusted to Martin Parr. Yan Morvan exhibits several photos there alongside, among others, Berenice Abbott, Eugène Atget, Brassaï, Robert Capa, Henri Cartier-Bresson, Josef Koudelka and Marc Riboud.

From 18 June to 19 September 2010, he exhibited his images of the Berlin Wall at the Festival des promenades de Vendôme.

From 13 September to 19 October 2013, on the occasion of the release of the book Gang Story, he exhibited at the gallery La Mauvais Réputation in Bordeaux.

In 2014, the MGF gallery in Paris organized an exhibition called Schizophrenia which mixed Polaroid snapshots taken during these reports on the war in Iraq, the famine in Rwanda, the pornography industry in California. From 25 January to 22 February, the Sit Down gallery in Paris is exhibiting the Gang.

In 2016, the Rencontres de la photographie d'Arles offered an exhibition of 80 photos from its Battlefields series. This exhibition is part of the theme of the festival "After the war". It compares the work of Yan Morvan to that of Don McCullin. Marco Zappone, curator of the exhibition, sums up the photographer's work on this series as follows: “In his Battlefields, Yan Morvan does not attempt to answer this question, but leaves it to the appreciation of the reader. On the other hand, at the end of this incredible effort, he discovers that he has continued his work as a photographer of the war, having captured it on film through the timeless genius of the place ”. Yan Morvan is simultaneously exhibiting his Black Blousons series in Arles at the Huit / Sit Down gallery. The Battlefields exhibition will also be on display at the Millau and Grands Causses museum, at the T&L gallery in Paris57. The exhibition will then be shown in Corbeil (Essonne) from 30 April to 22 May as part of the Mois de la photo du Grand Paris, then at the MAP Festival in Toulouse, from 1 to 30 June.

The year 2018 was marked by the release of the book Bobby Sands. Many exhibitions are organized on this occasion: the Visa photo festival for the image in Perpignan (from 31 August to 15 September), the Photo Doc Festival in Paris (from 4 to 13 October), the Auer Ory Foundation for photography in Hermance, Switzerland (from 19 September to 17 November) then in Chalon-sur-Saône during the Festival War on Screen.

The La Mauvais Réputation gallery in Bordeaux is exhibiting two series by Yan Morvan as part of the “Bordeaux 2019” cultural season. Anarchy in the UK devoted to the London scene of the early 1980s and Dissident, a dive into the world of gangs and black jackets. The same year he exhibited Anarchy in the UK at the Sit Down gallery in Paris (from 15 September to 18 October).

In 2020, he exhibited Eat the Rich at La Jetée (Montpellier) 64.65. The curator, Valentin Courtine, presenting the series Le Cuir et le Baston and the Years of Iron. The release of the 1981 book was accompanied by several events, its first exhibition entirely composed of platinum prints at Initial LABO, (Boulogne-Billancourt) 66.67 an exhibition of vintage prints at the Thierry-Marlat gallery (Paris). A large exhibition around the Place de la Bastille69,70 organized by the François-Mitterrand Institute is organized from 10 to 17 May on the occasion of the anniversary of his accession to power.

Two photographs by Yan Morvan are part of the exhibition "Napoléon ?, Encore", dedicated to Napoleon in the Army Museum, alongside Yan Pei-Ming or Marina Abramovic.

The Maison des arts du Léman exhibits from May 2021, Première ligne and presents various series including many Cibachrome prints.

- 1979 : L'Autoroute, Canon Gallery, Genève, Suisse.
- 1982: L'État de grâce, FNAC galerie Étoile, Paris
- 1983: Beyrouth, 90 jours en été, galeries Fnac Forum
- 1984: L'Année en couleur, Sipa-Press galerie FNAC Paris
- 1985: Photographe de guerre, galerie Beaubourg, Paris
- 1985: Un voyage indien, galerie du Château d'eau, Toulouse
- 1986: Liban, Arles, Théâtre antique, Rencontres de la photographie
- 1986: Yan Morvan, la guerre au Liban, Nei Liicht Foto-Galeri, Luxembourg
- 1986: On the Line : The New Color Photo Journalism Walker Art Center Minneapolis
- 1986: La Ligne verte, FNAC galerie Montparnasse, Paris
- 1987: Eyewitness, 30 Years of World Press Exhibition International Center of Photography, New York City (exposition de groupe)
- 1988: Collection de photos FNAC, galerie FNAC Grenoble
- 1988: 50 Photographes à Grégolimano, Grèce
- 2000: Victimes de la route, Visa pour l'image, Perpignan
- 2000: Portraits de guerres, Galerie Mise au point
- 2004: exposition collective, Rencontres photographiques d'Arles
- 2010: Mur de Berlin, Festival promenades de Vendôme
- 2013: Gangs, La Mauvaise Réputation, Bordeaux
- 2014: Gangs, galerie Sit Down, Paris
- 2014: Schizophrenia, galerie MGF, Paris
- 2016: Blousons Noirs, galerie Thierry Marlat, Paris
- 2016: Champs de Bataille, T&L Galeri, Paris
- 2016: Champs de Bataille, La Mauvaise Réputation, Bordeaux
- 2016: Les Rencontres parisiennes de la photographie, Paris
- 2016: Champs de Bataille, Rencontres de la photographie, Arles
- 2017: Blousons noirs, festival L’Œil urbain, Corbeil-Essonnes
- 2017: Blousons noirs, festival MAP, Toulouse
- 2017: Champs de Barailles, Festival No'Photo, Genève
- 2018: Bobby Sands, Photo Doc, Paris
- 2018: Bobby Sands, Visa Pour l'image, Perpignan
- 2019: Bobby Sands, Fondation Auer, Hermance (Suisse)
- 2019: Bobby Sands, Chalon-sur-Saône
- 2019: Esprits rebelles, galerie LMR et Hôtel de Ragueneau, Bordeaux
- 2019: Liban, la ligne verte, galerie Folie, Paris
- 2019: Liban, la ligne verte, Chalon-sur-Saône
- 2019: Anarchie au Royaume-Uni, galerie Sit Down, Paris
- 2020: Eat the Rich, La Jetée, Montpellier
- 2020: Hexagone, Rencontres de la photographie d'Arles, gare de Lyon et gare d'Avignon
- 2021: 1981, exposition place de la Bastille, Institut François Mitterrand

== Publications ==
- Morvan, Yan; Maurice Lemoine (1976). Le Cuir et le Baston (in French). Ailleurs. p. 246.
- Morvan, Yan (1994). Le Photojournalisme (in French). Contrejour. ISBN 9782859491703.
- Morvan, Yan (1995). Photojournalisme, Le Guide (in French). CFD.
- Morvan, Yan; Jean-Marc Barbieux (1995). Mondosex. Petit Catalogue raisonné des comportements sexuels à l'aube du xxie siècle (in French). Contrejour. ISBN 978-2859491789.
- Morvan, Yan; Jean-Marc Barbieux (2000). Gang (in French). Marval. ISBN 9782862343105.
- Morvan, Yan (2000). Photojournalisme (in French). Victoires Editions. ISBN 978-2908056372.
- Morvan, Yan (2003). BodMod (in French). Marval. p. 142. ISBN 9782862343570.
- Morvan, Yan (2011). Reporter de guerre (in French). p. 246. ISBN 9782732451756.
- Morvan, Yan (2012). Gang Story (in French). La Manufacture de livres. ISBN 9782358870498.
- Morvan, Yan (2015). Champs de bataille (in French). Photosynthèses. p. 660. ISBN 9782363980113.
- Morvan, Yan (2015). Blousons noirs (in French). La Manufacture de Livres. p. 176. ISBN 9782358870771.
- Morvan, Yan; Pierre Mikaïloff (2018). Race with the devil (in French). Serious Publishing. ISBN 9782363200228.
- Morvan, Yan (2018). Liban (in French). Photosyntheses. p. 472. ISBN 9791095822004.
- Morvan, Yan; Sorj Chalandon (2018). Bobby Sands (in French). André Frère. p. 240. ISBN 9791092265712.
- Morvan, Yan (2018). Battlefields. Abbeville Press. p. 668. ISBN 978-0789-2130-75.
- Morvan, Yan; Don Letts et Francis Dordor (2019). Les Années de fer (in French). ISBN 9782363200280.
- Morvan, Yan (2019). BKK (in French and English). p. 176. ISBN 9782490676132.
- Morvan, Yan (2020). Pigalle (in French). La Manufacture de livres. p. 235. ISBN 9782358876841.
- Morvan, Yan (2021). 1981 (in French). Edisens. ISBN 9782351133675.
- Morvan, Yan (2021). Larzac, la première Zad (in French). La Manufacture de livres. ISBN 9782358877848.

== The Archives Yan Morvan (magazine) ==
The recurrence of wars and the regular evolutions of marginalized populations made Yan Morvan understand that he could use these archive photos to better illustrate current phenomena.

He put this concept into practice by alternately publishing contemporary and archival subjects. Lebanon, published in 2018 and whose photos date from 1882 to 1985, is a warning to the situation in the Middle East. To illustrate Brexit, Yan Morvan released in 2018 and 2019 two books, Bobby Sands, on the funeral of the Irish nationalist in 1981, then The Years of Iron on England by Margaret Thatcher.

BKK, dealing with the condition of sex workers in Thailand in 1979 is a strong message on the condition of women in 2019, Pigalle released in 2020 between the two confinements, plunges us into the world of Parisian nights in the 1990s.

In 2020, Yan Morvan decides to join forces with the Parisian book publishing and distribution company IC (IndustrieCulturelle) to develop a bimonthly magazine limited to 300 copies for each publication. The subjects, taken from the archives of Yan Morvan, will constitute a collection of over 100 magazines and books. It is edited by Quentin Euverte.

- Digue des Français, 1 May 2021
- Lady Diana, 15 May 2021
- Liban, 1 June 2021
- Squat Didot, 15 June 2021
- Fetish Girls (2002), 1 July 2021
- Lourdes, 15 July 2021
- Max Hardcore,, 1 August 2021
- Digue des Français, 1 May 2021
- Lady Diana, 15 May 2021
- Lourdes, 1 June 2021
- Squat Didot, 15 June 2021
- Liban-Inédits, 1 July 2021
- Fetish Girls (2002), 15 July 2021
- Max Hardcore, 1 August 2021
- Arafat (1982), 15 August 2021
- E-Junk (2002), 1 September 2021
- Saintes-Maries de la Mer, 15 September 2021
- Kosovo (1999), 1 October 2021
- Furries (2002), 15 October 2021
- Palace, 1 November 2021
- Sextoys, 15 November 2021
- Teresa, 1 December 2021
- Berlin 81, 15 December 2021
- Culturisme, 1 January 2022
- Légion, 15 January 2022

== Awards ==
His war reporting earned him a mention for the Robert-Capa Prize, for his work in Lebanon in 1983 and two World Press Photo prizes in 1984.

== Public collections ==
- Army Museum, Hôtel national des Invalides, Paris: Battlefields (2004-2017),
- National Center for Plastic Arts Walker Art Center, Minneapolis
- Multimedia Art Museum, Moscow
