= Marseille (TV series) =

French drama web television series

- Genre: Political drama
- Created by: Dan Franck
- Starring: Gérard Depardieu; Benoît Magimel; Géraldine Pailhas; Nadia Fares; Stéphane Caillard
- Composer: Alexandre Desplat
- Country of origin: France
- Original language: French
- No. of seasons: 2
- No. of episodes: 16

Production
- Executive producers: Erik Barmack; Kelly Luegenbiehl; Emmanuel Jacquelin
- Producer: Pascal Breton
- Production company: Federation Entertainment

Original release
- Network: Netflix
- Release: 5 May 2016 – 23 February 2018

Marseille is a French drama television series created by Dan Franck starring Gérard Depardieu. The series is the first French language original production for Netflix, which ordered the project to series on 10 July 2015. The eight-episode first season premiered worldwide on Netflix on 5 May 2016. A second season was ordered on 6 June 2016. Production for the second season commenced on 18 April 2017. The second season debuted in February 2018. Netflix cancelled the show after 2 seasons. Depardieu's character was inspired by the longtime Marseille mayor Jean-Claude Gaudin, who dubbed the character "the other mayor".

== Plot ==
After two decades as mayor of Marseille, Robert Taro (Depardieu) enters into a war of succession with his former protégé turned rival Lucas Barres (Benoît Magimel). Both men are members of the "UPM" party, based on the centre-right UMP (Union for a Popular Movement). A betrayal ignites a bitter war between a master politician and his hungry young protégé in this sweeping tale of corruption, seduction and revenge. Then, the battle for the heart of Marseille heats up as right-wing nationalists gain power and a shadowy conspiracy targets the city's beloved football team.

== Cast and English dubbing ==
=== Main characters ===
Actor	Character	Voice actor
Gérard Depardieu	Robert Taro	Michael McConnohie
Benoît Magimel	Lucas Barrès	Kyle McCarley
Géraldine Pailhas	Rachel Taro	Anne Yatco
Nadia Fares	Vanessa d'Abrantes	Karen Strassman
Stéphane Caillard	Julia Taro	Cristina Valenzuela

=== Side characters ===
Actor	Character	Voice actor
Guillaume Arnault	Eric	Johnny Yong Bosch
Hedi Bouchenafa	Farid	Kirk Thornton
Nassim Si Ahmed	Selim	Tony Azzolino
Jean-René Privat	Cosini	Keith Silverstein
Pascal Elso	Pierre Chasseron	Dave Mallow
Carolina Jurczak	Barbara	Cherami Leigh
Eric Savin	Pharamond	Steve Kramer
Hippolyte Girardot	Dr. Osmont	Joe Ochman
Lionel Erdogan	Alain Costabone	Steve Staley

== Episodes ==
=== Season 1 (2016) ===
No. overall	No. in season	Title	Directed by	Written by	Original release date
1	1	"20 Ans (20 Years)"	Florent Emilio Siri	Dan Franck	May 5, 2016
There is to be an important vote on a regeneration project of the city's waterfront, which will include a casino. Mayor Robert Taro supports the proposal as it will be his legacy to Marseille; he is counting on the support of Lucas Barrès, his ambitious young deputy, who eventually votes to oppose the proposal. A retired judge, who was also going to support the proposal, is approached and assassinated by gangsters. Taro's daughter Julia, a journalist, is trying to investigate life in the banlieues.
2	2	"Homme de Paille (Straw Man)"	Florent Emilio Siri	Dan Franck	May 5, 2016
Taro is unsure about whether to stand for re-election due to his ill health and declining popularity with voters. His wife, Rachel, learns that she has syringomyelia which will bring an end to her career as a successful classical cellist.
3	3	"Crocodile"	Florent Emilio Siri	Dan Franck	May 5, 2016
4	4	"Intox (Intox Brainwashing)"	Florent Emilio Siri	Dan Franck	May 5, 2016
5	5	"Face à Face (Face-off)"	Thomas Gilou	Dan Franck	May 5, 2016
6	6	"Liberté, Egalité, sans Pitié (Liberty, Equality, without Pity)"	Thomas Gilou	Dan Franck	May 5, 2016
7	7	"A voté (Voted)"	Thomas Gilou	Dan Franck	May 5, 2016
8	8	"La Lutte Finale (The Final Battle)"	Thomas Gilou	Dan Franck	May 5, 2016

=== Season 2 (2018) ===
No. overall	No. in season	Title	Directed by	Written by	Original release date
9	1	"Parjure (Perjury)"	Florent Emilio Siri	Unknown	February 23, 2018
With the election thrown into turmoil, Lucas finds himself at the center of a political feeding frenzy. Rachel makes a dramatic public statement.
10	2	"Emprise (Dominance)"	Florent Emilio Siri	Unknown	February 23, 2018
As Lucas adjusts to his new role, the death of a public figure rattles the city. Julia digs for information on a mystery man who's suddenly vanished
11	3	"Conquête (Conquest)"	Florent Emilio Siri	Unknown	February 23, 2018
While Robert fights the stadium sale, Jeanne pressures Lucas to beef up the city's security. Julia's suspicions lead her into dangerous territory.
12	4	"Résistance (Resistance)"	Laïla Marrakchi	Unknown	February 23, 2018
Robert forges ahead with Julia's research, Jeanne goes rogue, and Rachel takes a risk to help Tod. Meanwhile, Chahid prepares for his mission.
13	5	"Capitulation (Capitulation)"	Laïla Marrakchi	Unknown	February 23, 2018
As Eric tries to avert a tragedy, Driss makes an unexpected announcement. A crisis leaves Lucas stuck in a difficult -- and vulnerable -- position.
14	6	"Révélation (Revelation)"	Laïla Marrakchi	Unknown	February 23, 2018
Sweeping changes at City Hall inflame tensions across Marseille. Eric tips Rachel off to Julia's ordeal. Jeanne makes an unsettling discovery.
15	7	"Abandon (Abandon)"	Florent Emilio Siri	Unknown	February 23, 2018
As the city again mourns one of its own, Robert vows to track down the culprits. Lucas grapples with Jeanne's news. Eric begins to unravel.
16	8	"Justice (Justice)"	Florent Emilio Siri	Unknown	February 23, 2018
Julia tries a new tactic to recover her memories, Jeanne takes a drastic step to protect her career, and Robert and Lucas plot to save their city.

== Release ==
The show's first season released worldwide on Netflix on 5 May 2016, and the first two episodes have aired on TF1. The second season was released on Netflix on 23 February 2018.

== Critical reception ==
In France, the series received a mostly negative reaction from the press. Pierre Sérisier, writing for Le Monde, called it an "industrial accident". Télérama gave the series a "red card", while Alain Carrazé on Europe 1 referred to it as something from "the 90s" with "cartoonish and ridiculous dialogue".

However, reception outside France was more positive.
