= Gilles Coulier =

Belgian film director

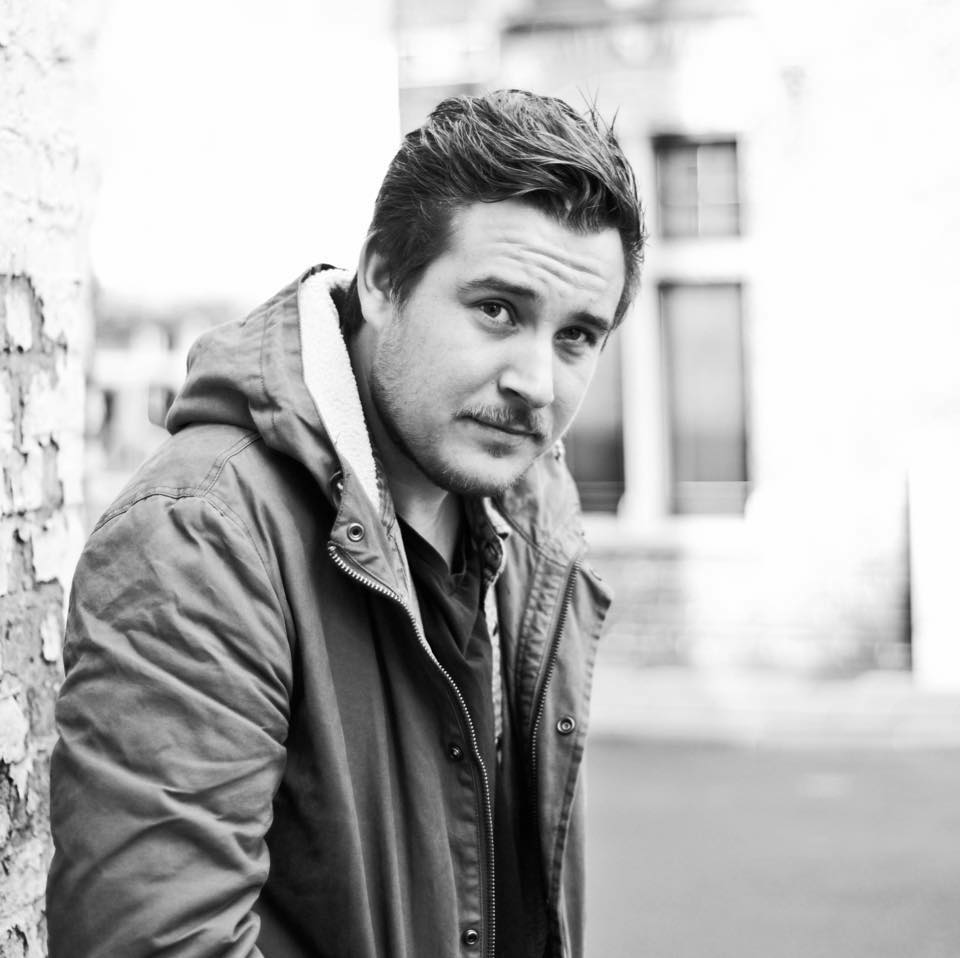
- Born: Gilles P.A. Coulier; October 30, 1986 (age 39); Bruges, Belgium
- Occupation: Director – Writer – Producer
- Years active: 2009–present
- Agent: Independent Talent Group UK // ICM
- Notable work: Cargo – The Day – The Natives
- Movement: Independent Cinema
- Website: https://www.imdb.com/name/nm3899315/?ref_=nv_sr_1

Gilles Coulier (Bruges, October 30, 1986) is a Belgian film director, screenwriter, and producer.

Gilles Coulier is best known for his feature film Cargo (2017) and the television series Bevergem(2015), De Dag (2018), and War of The Worlds (2019). He studied Audiovisual Arts at the Sint-Lukas School of Arts in Brussels. His graduation project, the short film IJsland (2009), was screened in the prestigious Cinéfondation section at the Cannes Film Festival and won multiple awards. Following his graduation, Coulier pursued a successful career in film and television. His short film Mont Blanc (2013) was once again selected for the Cannes Film Festival.

In 2013, he co-founded the production company De Wereldvrede with Gilles De Schryver and Wouter Sap, through which they produced Bevergem, a series that quickly became a cult classic.

In 2017, Coulier made his feature film debut with Cargo, a drama set in the rough Flemish fishing community, which premiered at the San Sebastián Film Festival. The film gained international recognition, being featured at the BFI London Film Festival, the Thessaloniki Film Festival, and the Göteborg Film Festival.

Coulier also directed the acclaimed thriller series De Dag and in 2019 directed the first four episodes of the international series War of the Worlds for Fox and Canal+. In 2020, he co-created the VRT series Lockdown with Maarten Moerkerke, which won the Student Jury Prize at the Canneseries Festival in 2021.

As a producer, Coulier is known for the critically acclaimed series Roomies (2022), Albatros (2020), and the film Julie Keeps Quiet (2024), which premiered at the Cannes Film Festival in 2024.

Throughout his career, Coulier has received several awards, including the Jo Röpke Award and the prestigious Cultural Prize from KU Leuven for his contribution to Flemish cinema.

== Filmography ==
- As Director
  - Lockdown (TV series, 2021)
  - War of the Worlds (TV series, 2019)
  - De Dag (TV series, 2018)
  - Cargo (2017)
  - Bevergem (TV series, 2015)
  - Mont Blanc (short film, 2012)
  - Paroles (short film, 2010)
  - IJsland (short film, 2009)
- As Producer
  - Julie Keeps Quiet (2024)
  - Roomies (TV series, 2022)
  - Holy Rosita (2024)
  - Lockdown (TV series, 2021)
  - Albatros (TV series, 2020)
  - War of the Worlds (TV series, 2019)
  - Cargo (2017)
  - Bevergem (TV series, 2015)
