= Philippe Faucon =

French film director, screenwriter and producer

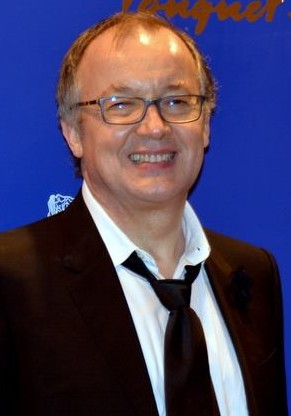
- Philippe Faucon at the 2016 César Awards
- Born: 26 January 1958 (age 67); Oujda, Morocco
- Occupation(s): Film director, screenwriter, producer
- Years active: 1984–present

Philippe Faucon (French pronunciation: [filip fokɔ̃]; born 26 January 1958) is a French film director, screenwriter and producer.

== Life and career ==
Philippe Faucon was born in Oujda, the son of a French soldier and an Algerian pied-noir mother. He grew up between Morocco and Algeria, where his father did his military service. After completing his studies at Aix-Marseille University, he began to work in film and in 1984, he directed his first short film, titled La Jeunesse.

In 2015, he directed the film Fatima, which was screened in the Directors' Fortnight section at the 2015 Cannes Film Festival. For the film, he received the Louis Delluc Prize for Best Film, the César Award for Best Film and the César Award for Best Adaptation, among other awards.

== Political views ==
In December 2023, alongside 50 other filmmakers, Faucon signed an open letter published in Libération demanding a ceasefire and an end to the killing of civilians amid the 2023 Israeli invasion of the Gaza Strip, and for a humanitarian corridor into Gaza to be established for humanitarian aid, and the release of hostages.

== Filmography ==
Year	Title	Credited as			Notes
Year	Title	Director	Screenwriter	Other	Notes
1984	La Jeunesse	Yes			Short film
1986	Mauvais Sang			Yes	Location manager
1990	L'Amour	Yes	Yes		Cannes Film Festival - Perspectives of French Cinema Award
1993	Sabine	Yes	Yes		
1995	Muriel fait le désespoir de ses parents	Yes	Yes		
1995	Trois minutes de politique			Yes	Short film; executive producer
1995	Le Ravin			Yes	Short film; executive producer
1996	Les Jumeaux			Yes	Short film; also producer and editor
1996	L'@mour Est À Réinventer	Yes	Yes		TV mini-series
1996	Being Seventeen	Yes	Yes		Telefilm
1998	Les Étrangers	Yes	Yes		Telefilm
2000	Samia	Yes	Yes	Yes	Also editor Amiens International Film Festival - Prize of the City of Amiens
2002	Grégoire peut mieux faire	Yes	Yes		Telefilm
2002	Lulu			Yes	Actor
2005	The Betrayal	Yes	Yes	Yes	Also associate producer and casting director
2007	Dans la vie	Yes	Yes	Yes	Also producer and actor (uncredited)
2008	D'amour et de révoltes	Yes			TV series
2010	Making Off	Yes	Yes		Short film
2011	The Disintegration	Yes	Yes	Yes	Also associate producer
2015	Fatima	Yes	Yes	Yes	Also producer César Award for Best Film; César Award for Best Adaptation; French Syndicate of Cinema Critics - Best French Film; Louis Delluc Prize for Best Film; Lumière Award for Best Screenplay; Nominated—Prix Jacques Prévert du Scénario for Best Adaptation
2018	Amin	Yes	Yes		
