= List of frequent Claire Denis collaborators =

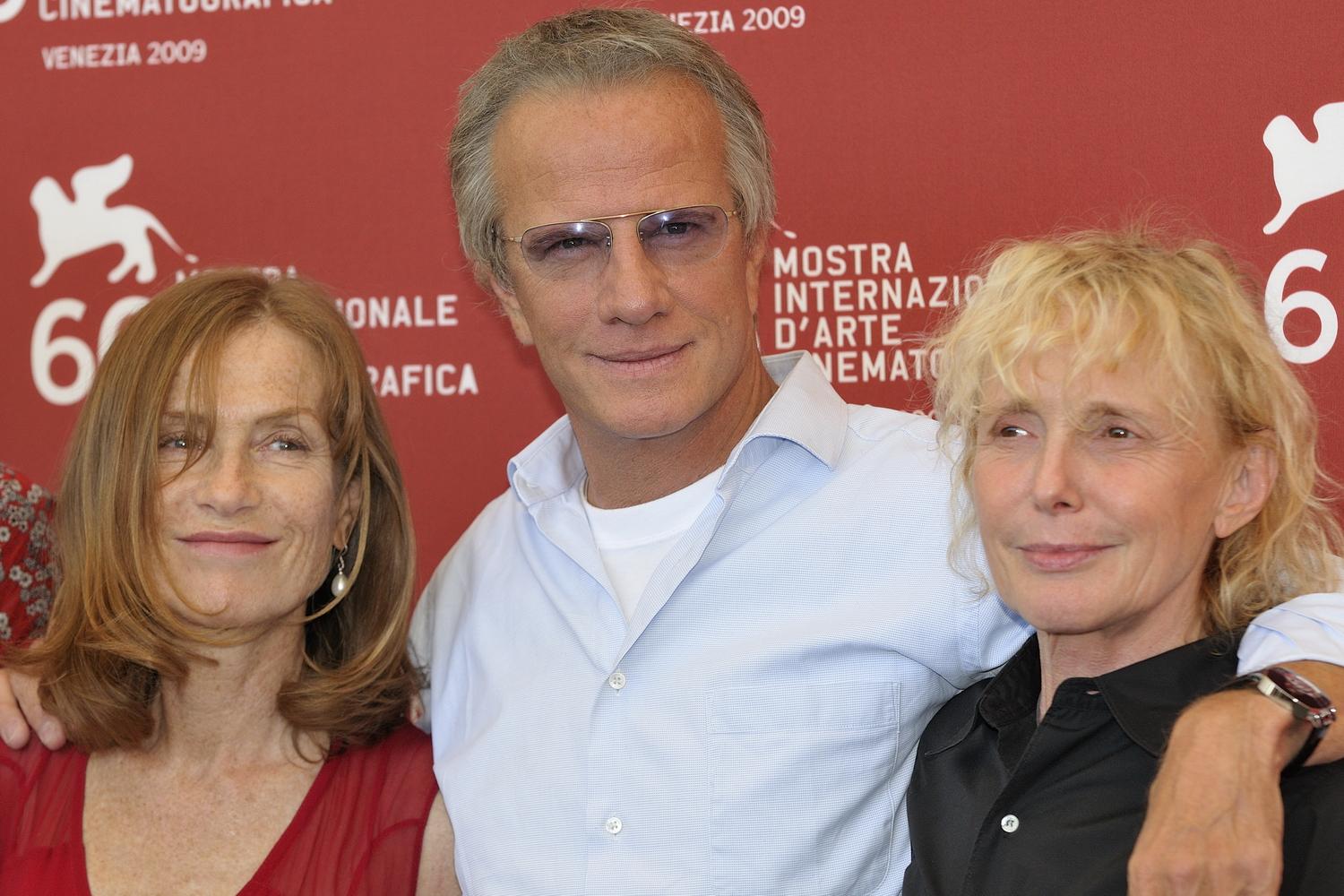
Claire Denis (right) on the 66th Venice International Film Festival's photocall for White Material, which starred Isabelle Huppert (left) and Christopher Lambert (center). The film was their first and hitherto only collaboration.

Claire Denis (born 21 April 1946) is a French filmmaker, screenwriter and occasional actress. Born in Paris, but raised in various parts of Africa, she made a career assisting other directors—primarily Costa-Gavras, Wim Wenders and Jim Jarmusch—before debuting with her own film, Chocolat, in 1988. She has since then made twelve feature films, three documentary films, in addition to several short films for anthology film series.

Known for their elliptical and sensual style, her films are often analysed in terms of tactility, corporeality and otherness. Several of her films, including Chocolat, are set in former French colonies in Africa, and examine the tension between native Africans and French authority figures.

Denis often works with the same actors and technicians, her artistic collaboration having been called "vital", "crucial", and a "keystone throughout her career". The director of photography Agnès Godard has shot almost every feature by Denis, and has said of the director that "[s]he has the faith and the belief that an association of ideas that's concise and that is based on pure cinematography — the choice of a frame, a focal point, the climate of the light — says something, and the idea that gluing those images together is going to create a sense." Denis often collaborates with Jean-Pol Fargeau on her scripts.

Her collaboration with Stuart Staples of the Tindersticks has been particularly noted. The band has on occasion performed live renditions of their songs from Denis' oeuvre, accompanied by screenings of film clips. These live performances have been analysed as examples of Paul Ricœur's theory of discourse as performance.

== Key ==
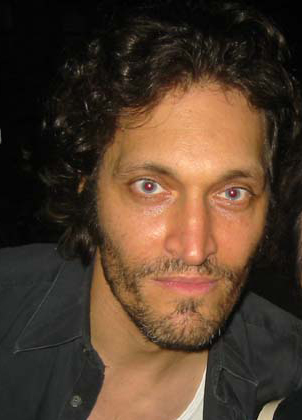
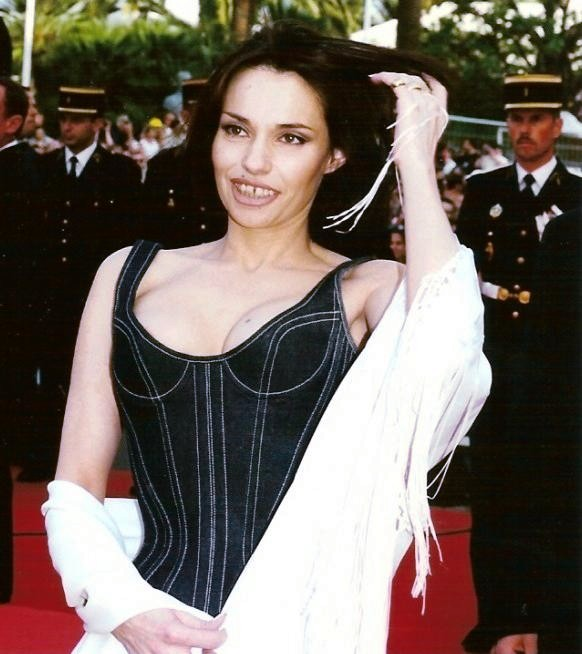
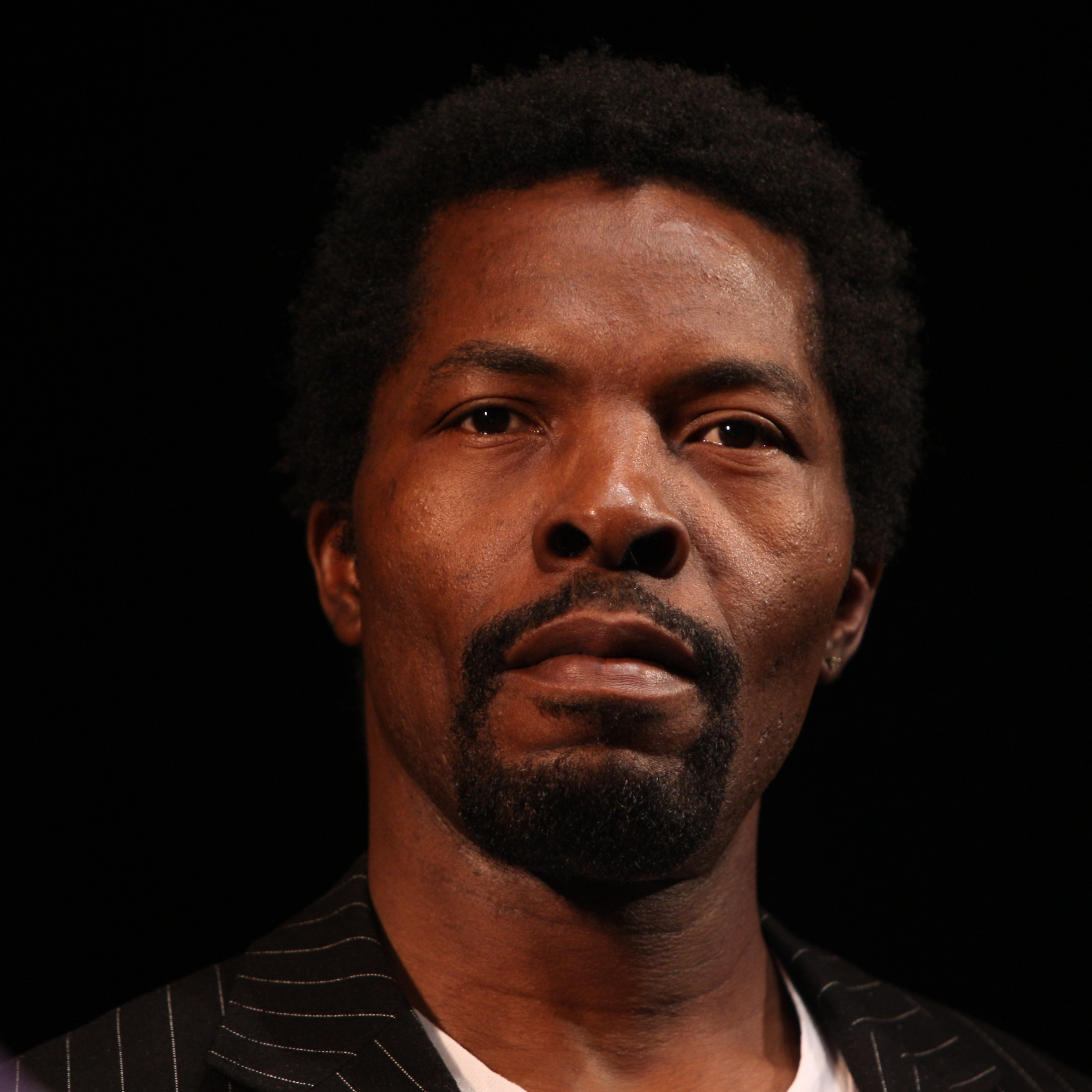
Denis has cast Vincent Gallo (left), Béatrice Dalle (center) and Isaach de Bankolé (right) in several of her films. Both Dalle and Gallo had worked with her in the 1990s, and appeared together in the horror film Trouble Every Day (2001). Bankolé played a supporting role in her début film, Chocolat (1988), and had a minor role in White Material (2009); both films were set in Africa.

Key	Title	Year
CH	Chocolat	1988
NF	No Fear, No Die	1990
KI	Keep It for Yourself	1991
JR	Jacques Rivette, le veilleur	1990
CS	I Can't Sleep	1994
US	US Go Home	1994
NB	Nénette and Boni	1996
BT	Beau Travail	1999
ED	Trouble Every Day	2001
FN	Friday Night	2002
TI	The Intruder	2004
35	35 Shots of Rum	2008
WM	White Material	2009
BS	Bastards	2013
LS	Let the Sunshine In	2017
HL	High Life	2018
BB	Both Sides of the Blade	2022

== Cast ==
Individual	CH	NF	KI	ICS	US	NB	BT	TED	FN	TI	35	WM	BS	LSI	HL	BB	Total
Isaach de Bankolé	Yes	Yes										Yes					3
Juliette Binoche														Yes	Yes	Yes	3
Florence Loiret Caille								Yes	Yes	Yes							3
Grégoire Colin					Yes	Yes	Yes		Yes	Yes	Yes		Yes			Yes	8
Richard Courcet		Yes		Yes			Yes									Yes	4
Béatrice Dalle				Yes				Yes		Yes							3
Alex Descas		Yes		Yes		Yes		Yes		Yes	Yes		Yes	Yes			8
Mati Diop											Yes					Yes	2
Nicole Dogué											Yes		Yes				2
Nicolas Duvauchelle							Yes	Yes				Yes		Yes			4
Hélène Fillières									Yes				Yes				2
Vincent Gallo			Yes		Yes	Yes		Yes									4
Katerina Golubeva				Yes					Yes	Yes							3
Laurent Grévill				Yes									Yes	Yes			3
Alice Houri					Yes	Yes										Yes	3
Vincent Lindon									Yes				Yes			Yes	3
Michel Subor							Yes			Yes		Yes	Yes				4
Valeria Bruni Tedeschi						Yes								Yes			2
Claire Tran													Yes	Yes	Yes		3

Frequent collaborators include Isaach de Bankolé, Grégoire Colin, Florence Loiret Caille, Katerina Golubeva, Nicolas Duvauchelle, Michel Subor, Béatrice Dalle, Nicole Dogué, Hélène Fillières, Alex Descas, Richard Courcet, Alice Houri, Juliette Binoche and Vincent Lindon.

== Crew ==
Denis frequently collaborates with Jean-Pol Fargeau (script), Nelly Quettier (editing), Agnès Godard (cinematography) and Stuart A. Staples (soundtrack).
