= Clubbed to Death =

Clubbed to Death may refer to any of the following things:

- "Clubbed to Death" (instrumental), a track on Rob Dougan's album Furious Angels, featured in the soundtrack of The Matrix
- Clubbed to Death (film), a 1997 French film starring Élodie Bouchez
- Clubbed to Death, an album by The Stranglers
- Clubbed to Death, an Edinburgh-based band on Benbecula Records
