= Trouble Every Day (film) =

2001 film directed by Claire Denis

- French theatrical release poster
- Directed by: Claire Denis
- Screenplay by: Claire Denis; Jean-Pol Fargeau
- Produced by: Georges Benayoun
- Starring: Vincent Gallo; Tricia Vessey; Béatrice Dalle; Alex Descas
- Cinematography: Agnès Godard
- Edited by: Nelly Quettier
- Music by: Tindersticks
- Production companies: Arte France Cinéma; Canal+; Centre national de la cinématographie; Dacia Films; Messaouda Films; Zweites Deutsches Fernsehen
- Distributed by: Rézo Films (France); Kinetique (Japan)
- Release dates: 13 May 2001 (Cannes); 11 July 2001 (France); 2 November 2002 (Japan)
- Running time: 101 minutes
- Countries: France; Germany; Japan
- Languages: French; English
- Budget: $3.8 million
- Box office: $800.000

Trouble Every Day is a 2001 erotic horror film directed by Claire Denis and written by Denis and Jean-Pol Fargeau. It stars Vincent Gallo, Tricia Vessey, Béatrice Dalle, Alex Descas and Marilu Marini. The film's soundtrack is provided by Tindersticks. The plot follows American scientist Shane Brown, who neglects his wife on their honeymoon to Paris to locate his former colleague Léo Semenau and his wife Coré, who harbors cannibalistic urges.

Described as part of the New French Extremity film movement, the film caused controversy at its premiere at 2001 Cannes Film Festival and polarized critics, with many booing or walking out during the screening.

== Plot ==
An American couple, Dr. Shane Brown and his wife June, go to Paris, ostensibly for their honeymoon. In reality, Shane has come to Paris to hunt down neuroscientist Dr. Léo Sémeneau and his wife, Coré, whom Shane once knew and was obsessed with. Despite having had a prolific career, Léo is now working as a general practitioner to keep a low profile. He locks Coré in their house every day, but she occasionally escapes and initiates sex with men before violently murdering them. To protect her, Léo buries the bodies.

Shane begins investigating Sémeneau's whereabouts. A doctor who once worked with Léo eventually gives Shane the couple's address, explaining that Coré is unwell. Meanwhile, two young men who have been casing the Sémeneau home break in, and one of them finds Coré in a boarded-up room. After she seduces him, they begin to have sex, but she violently bites him to death, ripping out his tongue with her teeth. When Shane arrives at the house, he discovers Coré covered in blood. She tries to bite him, but Shane is able to overpower her. As he strangles her, she drops a match, setting the house on fire. Shane leaves her to be consumed by the flames. Just after Shane departs, Léo arrives and witnesses the carnage and the dead Coré.

After Coré's death, Shane becomes strange and distant. While having sex with his wife, he stops and finishes by masturbating, then runs away from her and adopts a puppy. Finally, he returns to the hotel where he is honeymooning while his wife is away. He then proceeds to brutally rape a maid he has been observing throughout the film and bites her to death, then showers and washes the blood from his body. His wife enters and the couple agree to return home.

== Cast ==
- Vincent Gallo as Shane Brown
- Tricia Vessey as June Brown
- Béatrice Dalle as Coré
- Alex Descas as Léo Semenau
- Florence Loiret Caille as Christelle
- Nicolas Duvauchelle as Erwan
- Raphaël Neal as Ludo
- José Garcia as Choart
- Hélène Lapiower as Malécot
- Marilu Marini as Friessen
- Aurore Clément as Jeanne

== Production ==
=== Development ===
The film's genesis dates back to 1989, when Claire Denis, on a short film in New York, met Vincent Gallo. At the request of a television channel, she considered a project for a horror genre film set at night in the city, starring Gallo. The project never came to fruition, but the idea of a gore film persisted in her mind. While filming Beau Travail, she resumed work on the screenplay with Jean-Pol Fargeau and developed the writing for Trouble Every Day, planning from the outset to entrust the lead roles to Vincent Gallo, thus realizing her ten-year-old idea, and Béatrice Dalle. Among the central elements that Denis put in the film were the descriptions of romantic relationships through the prism of predation, sexual desire, and the devouring part of the other touching on symbolic vampirism, as described in 19th century novels, the mysterious illnesses that strike certain people and the search for remedies (Denis evoked research on vaccines, medicinal plants, neurobiology and the study of behaviors, as well as certain works of Jean-Pierre Changeux, whom she met), and the references to children's tales (stories of ogres and princesses).

From the first version of the script, consisting of a long text before its re-division into classic sections, Denis sought to create a permanent feeling of danger and anxiety. To do this, she drew inspiration from the works of Canadian photographer Jeff Wall, whose books she gave to Agnès Godard, her director of photography, in order to create this sought-after atmosphere.

=== Filming ===
Alice Houri, who starred in Denis' previous film Nénette et Boni, has a small cameo as a girl on a metro who watches Shane.

== Release ==
Trouble Every Day was screened out of competition at the 2001 Cannes Film Festival.

== Reception ==
The film received mixed reviews from critics and generated controversy upon its screening at Cannes, with many booing and walking out, as well as two women in the audience fainting due to the film's violence, requiring an ambulance to be called. On Rotten Tomatoes the film has a "rotten" approval rating of 58%, with an average rating of 6.4/10 based on 64 reviews. The site's consensus states: "An erotic thriller dulled by a messy narrative." On Metacritic the film has a weighted average score of 40 out of 100 based on reviews from 16 critics, indicating "mixed or average reviews".

Derek Elley of Variety described the film as "over-long, under-written and needlessly obscure instead of genuinely atmospheric." Chris Fujiwara of The Boston Globe was more positive, but concluded his review by calling the film "a success in some sense, but it's hard to like a film so cold and dead."

Later, the film developed a small cult following, who admire it for its themes of existentialism and its unique take on the horror genre as well as gender roles. It was given an in depth analysis by Salon, which looked at the intricacies of the film, particularly the metaphorical nature of the narrative. At Film Freak Central, Walter Chaw said, "Plaintive and sad, Claire Denis' Trouble Every Day is a rare combination of honesty, beauty, and maybe even genius." The film has been associated with the New French Extremity.

== See also ==
- Vampire films

== Sources ==
- Beugnet, Martine. (2007) Cinema And Sensation: French Film And The Art Of Transgression. Edinburgh: Edinburgh University Press. [see pages 32–47]
- Nancy, Jean-Luc. (2008) ‘Icon Fury: Claire Denis’s “Trouble Every Day”’, Film-Philosophy, 12(1), pp. 1–9. https://doi.org/10.3366/film.2008.0002.
- Scholz, Sebastian. and Surma, Hanna. (2008) ‘Exceeding The Limits Of Representation: Screen And / As Skin In Claire Denis’s “Trouble Every Day” (2001)’, Studies in French Cinema, 8(1), pp. 5–16. https://doi.org/10.1386/sfc.8.1.5_1.
- Taylor, Kate. (2007) ‘Infection, Postcolonialism And Somatechnics In Claire Denis’s Trouble Every Day (2002)’, Studies in French Cinema, 7(1), pp. 19–29. https://doi.org/10.1386/sfci.7.1.19_1.
