= Olivier, Olivier =

- Theatrical release poster
- Directed by: Agnieszka Holland
- Screenplay by: Agnieszka Holland
- Starring: François Cluzet; Brigitte Roüan; Gregoire Colin; Frédéric Quiring; Marina Golovine
- Cinematography: Bernard Zitzermann
- Edited by: Isabel Lorente
- Music by: Zbigniew Preisner
- Production companies: Oliane Productions; Films A2; Canal+
- Distributed by: BAC Films
- Release date: 3 March 1993
- Running time: 110 minutes
- Country: France
- Language: French

Olivier, Olivier is a 1992 drama film directed by Agnieszka Holland. It entered the competition at the 49th Venice International Film Festival and won an award at the 1992 Valladolid International Film Festival.

The plot involves the disappearance of a nine-year-old boy. When he reappears in Paris six years later, there are doubts about his identity.

== Cast ==
- Grégoire Colin as Olivier
- Frédéric Quiring as Marcel
- Faye Gatteau as Nadine petite
- Emmanuel Morozof as Olivier petit
- Brigitte Roüan as Elisabeth Duval
- François Cluzet as Serge Duval

== Reception ==
=== Critical response ===
Oliver, Olivier has an approval rating of 88% on review aggregator website Rotten Tomatoes, based on 16 reviews, and an average rating of 7.6/10.
