= No Fear, No Die =

- Directed by: Claire Denis
- Written by: Claire Denis; Jean-Pol Fargeau
- Produced by: Francis Boespflug; Philippe Carcassonne
- Starring: Isaach De Bankolé; Alex Descas
- Cinematography: Pascal Marti
- Edited by: Dominique Auvray
- Music by: Abdullah Ibrahim
- Production companies: Cinéa; NEF Diffusion
- Distributed by: Pyramide Distribution
- Release date: 5 September 1990
- Running time: 90 minutes
- Countries: France; West Germany
- Language: French
- Box office: $390.000

No Fear, No Die (French: S'en fout la mort) is a 1990 drama film directed by Claire Denis and written by Denis in collaboration with Jean-Pol Fargeau. It features Isaach De Bankolé, Alex Descas and Solveig Dommartin.

== Plot ==
Two young men, Dah (Isaach De Bankolé) from Benin and Jocelyn (Alex Descas) from the Caribbean decide to work together as a team that organizes illegal cockfights in order to gain quick cash. Dah is responsible for the financial transactions while Jocelyn trains the animals. Jocelyn has a special attachment to one of the champion roosters he has named No Fear, No Die. No Fear, No Die, like all roosters, is eventually defeated causing Jocelyn to begin to lose interest in cockfighting.

Dah and Jocelyn have a third partner, Pierre (Jean Claude Brialy) who owns the space where the cockfights take place. Pierre has a pre-existing relationship with Jocelyn, having known both him and his mother before he immigrated to France. However he constantly haggles with the two men over money and insists that the cockfights become more violent urging the men to use razor blades and steel spurs instead of the birds’ natural spurs. After one particular fight Pierre also insinuates that he slept with Jocelyn's mother.

Disgusted, Jocelyn takes to drinking and becomes more and more despondent, developing an obsession with Pierre's wife Toni (Solveig Dommartin) and naming one of the roosters after her. One night he gets drunk and releases the roosters from their cages. Afterwards Jocelyn and Dah learn that Pierre has begun locking them in and insists on using steel spurs on the roosters that night. Enraged, Jocelyn breaks out and flees to Paris where Dah manages to track him down and convinces him to return to the cockfighting ring for one final night.

At the final fight Toni asks Jocelyn to take her with him after the fight when he and Dah leave, but he refuses. Meanwhile, Pierre organizes a fight between Toni's namesake rooster and one brought in by his gypsy business partners. Unable to watch his rooster die, Jocelyn jumps into the ring and rescues his bird, but is stabbed by Michel, Pierre's son and Toni's lover, before he can flee. Dah prepares and cleans his body before being arrested, along with Tony, Michel and other members of the cockfighting ring. After his release he quickly packs up his few possessions and finally leaves.

== Production ==
The film's soundtrack is by Abdullah Ibrahim.

The film marked the first time Denis and Alex Descas worked together. They would go on to collaborate on seven more films. It is also the second Denis film to feature Isaach De Bankolé.

== Release ==
The film premiered in competition at the 47th Venice International Film Festival. Editor Dominique Auvray was awarded a Silver Osella for her work on the film.
