= Vendredi soir =

- Directed by: Claire Denis
- Written by: Claire Denis; Emmanuèle Bernheim
- Produced by: Bruno Pésery
- Starring: Valérie Lemercier; Vincent Lindon
- Cinematography: Agnès Godard
- Edited by: Nelly Quettier
- Music by: Dickon Hinchliffe
- Distributed by: BAC Films
- Release date: 11 September 2002
- Running time: 90 minutes
- Country: France
- Language: French
- Box office: $156,918

Vendredi soir (Friday Night) is a 2002 drama film directed by Claire Denis. The screenplay was written by Claire Denis and Emmanuèle Bernheim, based upon Bernheim's novel of the same name. The film premiered at the 2002 Venice Film Festival.

== Plot ==
The night before moving in with her boyfriend, Laure goes to visit some friends and becomes stuck in traffic due to a Paris transit strike. Inspired by a radio news bulletin which encouraged drivers to car pool and offer rides to strangers, she decides to give a ride to a strange man named Jean she spots in the street and is immediately attracted to him. After cancelling on her friend, the two go for a pizza and then spend the night together in a hotel.

== Cast ==
- Valérie Lemercier as Laure
- Vincent Lindon as Jean
- Hélène de Saint-Père as Marie
- Hélène Fillières as The tired woman
- Florence Loiret Caille as The pinball girl (billed as Florence Loiret-Caille)
- Grégoire Colin as The young man in parka
- Gilles D'Ambra as Husband of the tired woman
- Micha Lescot as The receptionist
- Gianfranco Poddighe as The hotel manager
- Nordine Barour as The server
- Lionel Goldstein as The buyer
- Didier Woldemard as The driver of the van
- Nicolas Struve as The man in the collision
- Jérôme Pouly as The second man in the collision
- Nausicaa Meyer as The woman in the collision

== Reception ==
On review aggregator website Rotten Tomatoes, the film holds an approval rating of 79% based on 57 reviews, with an average rating of 7.0/10.
