= Nanayomachi =

- Directed by: Naomi Kawase
- Starring: Kyōko Hasegawa, Grégoire Colin
- Release date: 2008
- Country: Japan
- Language: Japanese

Nanayomachi (Japanese: 七夜待) is a 2008 Japanese drama film directed by Naomi Kawase.

The story is about a young Japanese woman (Kyōko Hasegawa) who leaves her job and lover in Japan to start a new life in Thailand. She searches for hotels in Bangkok and flees in panic when a taxi driver drives her out of town. Up pops Greg (played by Grégoire Colin) and takes her to a Thai matriarch who teaches him traditional massage.
