= The Absence (1992 film) =

1992 film

- Directed by: Peter Handke
- Screenplay by: Peter Handke
- Based on: The Absence by Peter Handke
- Cinematography: Agnès Godard
- Edited by: Peter Przygodda
- Music by: Joseph-Maria Bargadi; Heinrich Schutz
- Release date: 6 September 1992 (Venice)
- Running time: 112 minutes
- Countries: France; Germany; Spain
- Languages: French; German; Spanish

The Absence (French: L'Absence; German: Die Abwesenheit) is a 1992 French-German-Spanish drama film directed by Peter Handke. It follows the journey of four nameless people: the old man, the woman, the soldier, and the gambler. The film is based on Handke's novella with the same name. It premiered in competition at the 49th Venice International Film Festival.

== Cast ==
- Bruno Ganz as the gambler
- Jeanne Moreau as the writer's wife
- Alex Descas as the soldier
- Eustaquio Barjau as the writer
- Sophie Semin as the young woman
- Arielle Dombasle

== Release ==
The film premiered on 6 September 1992 in competition at the 49th Venice International Film Festival. It was released in France on 20 January 1993 and Germany on 24 February 1994.

== Reception ==
Thomas Quinn Curtiss wrote in The New York Times: "The movie, being shown at the film festival here, follows four people - an old man, a young woman, a soldier and a player - as they walk about an imaginary topography across continents, hoping to escape from their everyday existence. ... They pontificate and recite monologues, but as they arrive at no conclusions the spectator may wonder whether their journey was really necessary."
