= Room 666 =

- Directed by: Wim Wenders
- Written by: Wim Wenders
- Produced by: Chris Sievernich
- Starring: Steven Spielberg; Jean-Luc Godard; Rainer Werner Fassbinder; Werner Herzog; Monte Hellman; Michelangelo Antonioni
- Narrated by: Wim Wenders
- Cinematography: Agnès Godard
- Edited by: Chantal de Vismes
- Music by: Bernard Herrmann; Jürgen Knieper
- Distributed by: Gray City (1985) (USA) (subtitled); Kinowelt Home Entertainment (2006) (Germany) (DVD)
- Release date: 1982
- Running time: 44 minutes
- Countries: France; West Germany
- Languages: German; French; English; Portuguese; Italian

Room 666 (French: Chambre 666) is a 1982 documentary film directed by German film director Wim Wenders.

== Synopsis ==
During the 1982 Cannes Film Festival, Wenders set up a static camera in room 666 of the Hotel Martinez and provided selected film directors a list of questions to answer concerning the future of cinema. Each director is given one 16 mm reel (approximately 11 minutes) to answer the questions. The principal question asked was, "Is cinema a language about to get lost, an art about to die?" Wenders then edited this footage and added an introduction.

The directors interviewed include Steven Spielberg, Jean-Luc Godard, and Rainer Werner Fassbinder, who died less than a month after filming. The film was later screened out of competition at the 2006 Cannes Film Festival.

== In order of appearance ==
- Jean-Luc Godard
- Paul Morrissey
- Mike De Leon
- Monte Hellman
- Romain Goupil
- Susan Seidelman
- Noël Simsolo
- Rainer Werner Fassbinder
- Werner Herzog
- Robert Kramer
- Ana Carolina
- Maroun Bagdadi
- Steven Spielberg
- Michelangelo Antonioni
- Wim Wenders
- Yilmaz Güney

== See also ==
- Death of the novel
- Cinephilia
- Philosophy of film
