= Michel Subor =

French actor (1935–2022)

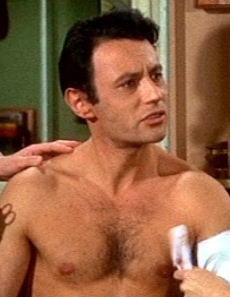
- Subor in Topaz (1969)
- Born: Mischa Subotzki; 2 February 1935; Paris, France
- Died: 17 January 2022 (aged 86); Toulouse, France
- Years active: 1955–2018

Michel Subor (French pronunciation: [miʃɛl sybɔʁ], born Mischa Subotzki; 2 February 1935 – 17 January 2022) was a French actor who gained initial fame with the starring role, Bruno Forestier, in Jean-Luc Godard's second feature, Le petit soldat (1960), but the French government banned it until 1963 because of its political content, touching on terrorism during the undeclared Algerian War. He acted in a couple of American films in the late 1960s including the role of Claude Jade's husband in Alfred Hitchcock's Topaz. In 1999, he once again played a character named Bruno Forestier in Beau Travail, a highly praised variation of Billy Budd. He would go on to make three more films with its director, Claire Denis.

== Early life and education ==
Michel Subor was born Mischa Subotzki in France in 1935, to anti-Bolshevik parents from the Soviet Union who had immigrated a few years earlier. His father was an engineer in Moscow, and his mother was born in Azerbaijan. He had a sister who moved to the United States as an adult.

== Career ==
His career started with small roles in Frou-Frou (1955) and Un drôle de dimanche (1958), followed by playing Roger Hanin's son in Mon pote le gitan (1959). His first leading role came by playing the lover of Brigitte Bardot's character in La Bride sur le Cou (1961). The year before he had completed Subor's most important early role as Bruno Forestier, a French deserter in Geneva in Jean-Luc Godard's Le Petit Soldat (1960), set against terrorist acts in France and Switzerland during the guerre sans nom of the Algerian War. The film starred Anna Karina in her debut. Due to its politically sensitive content, the French government banned its release until 1963, after the end of the war. A new print was released in 2012. The critic Roger Ebert wrote that "Godard, in 1960, making a film about the Algerian War, was portraying the sort of intellectual and moral confusion that good men have when they confront senseless events."

In 2005 Jacques Mandelbaum described Subor in Le Monde as one of the greatest actors in French cinema, but said that his roles in the 1960s and 1970s were not "as favorable, ambiguous, fascinating as the Little Soldier."

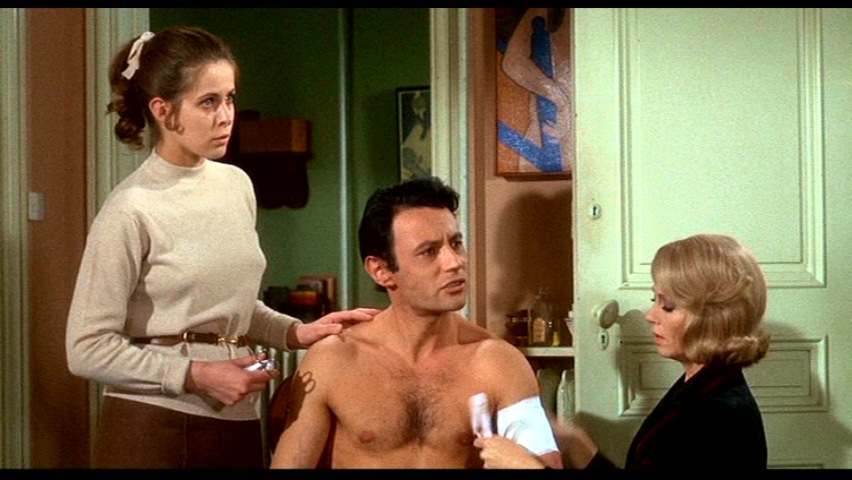
Claude Jade, Michel Subor and Dany Robin in Alfred Hitchcock's Topaz

Subor worked with the director Paul Gégauff, in The Reflux (1965), adapted from a novel by Robert Louis Stevenson. But the producer had not acquired the rights and the film was left unfinished in 1965. Subor was also cast in American films, appearing in Clive Donner's comedy What's New Pussycat? (1965) as the lover Philippe. In 1968/69 he starred in Alfred Hitchcock's Topaz (1969), featured as the journalist François Picard, the husband of the character played by Claude Jade. Hitchcock changed Subor's role and let François Picard survive the assassination attempt from the novel, so he returns wounded ("I've been shot, just a little") into Claude Jade's arms.

He appeared in Jean-Louis Bertucelli's The Imprecator (1977) and Gérard Blain's The Rebel (1980), but felt he never made the transition to mainstream cinema. Blain used Subor again in Amen he (1999).

That year's renewal of Subor's career included a role in Claire Denis's Beau Travail, as a Foreign Legion captain named Bruno Forestier. (Denis named his character after the role he played in the Godard film.) Denis' variation of Billy Budd, set in Djibouti on the Red Sea, received high praise. The next year he was in Wild Innocence (2000) directed by Philippe Garrel.

Subor has since worked with Denis on other films, including The Intruder (2005). She said of him: "Michel Subor is not a celebrity in L'Intrus; he is the intruder." ("Sur le plateau de L'Intrus, il a captivé tout le monde, mais personne n'a voulu percer son mystère. Michel Sobor n'est pas le personnage de L'Intrus, il est L'Intrus.") He also had a major role in her White Material in 2009, which was set in an unnamed country in Africa.

== Personal life and death ==
Subor died in a traffic collision in Toulouse on 17 January 2022, at the age of 86.

== Filmography ==
=== Film ===
- Frou-Frou (1955) - Le jeune homme au restaurant
- Un drole de dimanche (1958) - Un élève du cours (uncredited)
- Mon pote le gitan (1959) - Bruno Pittuiti
- La Bride sur le Cou (1961) - Alain Varnier
- Vacances en enfer (1961) - André
- Jules et Jim (1962) - Récitant / Narrator (voice)
- Le Petit Soldat (1963) - Bruno Forestier
- Les Saintes Nitouches (1963) - Gerard LeGall
- La vie conjugale: Jean-Marc (1964) - Roger
- La vie conjugale: Francoise (1964) - Roger
- What's New Pussycat? (1965) - Philippe
- La dame de pique (1965) - Herman
- Le reflux (1965) - Henri Person
- A nous deux Paris! (1966) - Patrick Cartier
- Su nombre es Daphne (1966)
- Hallucination Sadiques (1969) - L'inspecteur
- Topaz (1969) - Francois Picard
- The Day of the Jackal (1973) - 2nd OAS Terrorist in car (uncredited)
- Docteur Francoise Gailland (1976) - Régis Cabret
- Un tueur, un flic, ainsi soit-il... (1977) - François Nicaud - dit 'le chimiste'
- The Imprecator (1977) - Brignon
- Les Egouts du paradis (1978) - Biki le Targuy
- The Rebel (1980) - Beaufils
- Stress (1984) - Le commissaire de police
- Le quatrieme pouvoir (1985) - Xavier Mareche
- Secret Passage (1985) - Enrique
- La Revolution Francais (1989) - Vadier (segment "Années terribles, Les")
- Braxton (1989)
- Beau Travail (1999) - Commander Bruno Forestier
- Ainsi soit-il (2000) - Barroux
- Fidelity (2000) - Rupert MacRoi
- Wild Innocence (2001) (Philippe Garrel) - Chas
- Dear Hunter (2003) - Sam
- The Intruder (2004) - Louis Trebor
- White Material (2009) - Henri Vial, le propriétaire
- L'hiver Dernier (2011) - Hélier
- Bastards (2013) - Edouard Laporte

=== Television ===
Michel Subor television credits
Year	Title	Role	Notes	Ref.
1989	A Tale of Two Cities	Le père de Darnay (Darnay's Father)	TV miniseries	
1992	Counterstrike	Yuri	Episode: "Trigger Finger"	
2018	War on Beasts	Pierre Duruv	5 episodes	
