= Agnès Godard =

French cinematographer (born 1951)

- Born: 28 May 1951 (age 75); Dun-sur-Auron, France
- Occupation: Cinematographer
- Years active: 1982–present

Agnès Godard (born 28 May 1951) is a French cinematographer. She is most famous for her long-running collaboration with filmmaker Claire Denis. For her work, she has won a César Award.

== Life and career ==
Godard originally studied journalism, but switched to film after several years, graduating from La Femis (then known as IDHEC) in 1980. Her first project as a cinematographer was Wim Wenders' 50-minute Room 666, made for television. There she met Claire Denis, who was working as Wenders' assistant director.

Godard spent much of the 1980s working as an assistant camera operator or focus puller on films by Wenders, Joseph Losey, Peter Greenaway and Alain Resnais. She also served as director of photography on a short film directed by legendary cinematographer Henri Alekan. Her first collaboration with Denis was the director's debut feature, Chocolat, where she served as the camera operator; she has been Denis' regular cinematographer since 1990, when the two worked together on a documentary about Nouvelle Vague filmmaker Jacques Rivette made for the French television series Cinema, de Notre Temps.

== Filmography ==
- Let the Sunshine In (2017)
- The Falling (2015)
- Paris Follies (2014)
- The Amazing Catfish (2014)
- Bastards (2013)
- Sister (2012)
- Où va la nuit (2011)
- Simon Werner a Disparu (2010)
- Home (2008)
- 35 rhums (2008)
- Ensemble, c'est tout (2007)
- The Golden Door (2006)
- Backstage (2005)
- Vers Mathilde (2005)
- L'Intrus (2004)
- Wild Side (2004)
- Les égarés (2003)
- Ten Minutes Older: The Cello (2002) (segment "Vers Nancy")
- Vendredi soir (2002)
- Au plus près du paradis (2002)
- Trouble Every Day (2001)
- La Répétition (2001)
- Beau Travail (1999)
- Vie ne me fait pas peur (1999)
- La Nouvelle Ève (1999)
- L'Arrière pays (1998)
- The Dreamlife of Angels (1998)
- Années lycée: Petites (1997) (TV)
- Nénette et Boni (1996)
- Jeunesse sans Dieu (1996) (TV)
- À propos de Nice, la suite (1995) (segment "Nice, Very Nice")
- US Go Home (1994)
- I Can't Sleep (1994)
- Le Géographe manuel (1994)
- La robe à cerceau (1993) TV episode
- The Absence (1993)
- Sida, une histoire qui n'a pas de fin (1993)
- Histoires autour de la folie (1993) (TV)
- La Vis (1993)
- Dimanche soir (1992)
- Jacquot de Nantes (1991)
- Keep It for Yourself (1991)
- Jacques Rivette - Le veilleur (1990) (TV)
- Room 666 (1982) (TV)
