= The Intruder (2004 film) =

2004 film directed by Claire Denis

- French: L'intrus
- Directed by: Claire Denis
- Written by: Claire Denis; Jean-Pol Fargeau
- Based on: L'intrus by Jean-Luc Nancy
- Produced by: Humbert Balsan
- Starring: Michel Subor; Béatrice Dalle; Alex Descas
- Cinematography: Agnès Godard
- Edited by: Nelly Quettier
- Music by: Stuart A. Staples
- Release dates: 9 September 2004 (Venice); 4 May 2005 (France)
- Running time: 130 minutes
- Country: France
- Languages: French; English; Korean; Russian; Polynesian
- Box office: $40,853

The Intruder (French: L'intrus) is a 2004 French drama film directed by Claire Denis. The film had its world premiere in the Competition section at the 61st Venice International Film Festival on 9 September 2004. It was released in France on 4 May 2005.

== Plot ==
Louis Trebor, an ex-mercenary living in the Jura Mountains, is suffering increasingly from a heart condition. He abandons his home, beloved dogs, and estranged son in pursuit of a black market heart transplant in Korea before traveling to Tahiti, where he spent time in his youth, in the hope of connecting with a son he has never met.

== Cast ==
- Michel Subor as Louis Trebor
- Grégoire Colin as Sidney
- Katia Golubeva as The young Russian lady
- Béatrice Dalle as Queen of the Northern Hemisphere
- Florence Loiret Caille as Antoinette
- Alex Descas as The priest
- Bambou as The pharmacist
- Lolita Chammah as The wild woman

== Production ==
The film is inspired by a brief essay of the same name by Jean-Luc Nancy. Claire Denis also takes inspiration from Robert Louis Stevenson's writing and Paul Gauguin's South Seas paintings. Footage from Paul Gégauff's film Le Reflux is used in the film.

== Release ==
The film had its world premiere in the Competition section at the 61st Venice International Film Festival on 9 September 2004. It was released in France on 4 May 2005.

== Reception ==
On review aggregator website Rotten Tomatoes, the film holds an approval rating of 86% based on 29 reviews, and an average rating of 6.8/10. The website's critical consensus reads, "The impressionistic narrative may confound the viewer, but Denis crafts wonderfully poetic, dreamlike imagery." On Metacritic, the film has a weighted average score of 85 out of 100, based on 13 critics, indicating "universal acclaim".

Amy Taubin of Film Comment commented that "Denis is one of cinema's greatest narrative poets, and The Intruder, the story of an adventurer, is her most adventurous cinematic poem." Jay Weissberg of Variety wrote, "More opaque than her past works and unlikely to garner her new fans, Denis gives near equal weight to reality, dreams, nightmares and premonitions, resisting a traditional narrative in order to question the possibilities of escape within the modern world."

Slant Magazine placed the film at number 77 on the "100 Best Films of the Aughts" list.
