= 35 Shots of Rum =

2008 film by Claire Denis

- Theatrical film poster
- French: 35 Rhums
- Directed by: Claire Denis
- Written by: Claire Denis; Jean-Pol Fargeau
- Produced by: Bruno Pésery
- Starring: Alex Descas; Mati Diop; Nicole Dogue; Grégoire Colin
- Cinematography: Agnès Godard
- Edited by: Guy Lecorne
- Music by: Tindersticks
- Distributed by: Wild Bunch
- Release dates: 2 September 2008 (Venice); 18 February 2009 (France); 5 March 2009 (Germany)
- Running time: 100 minutes
- Countries: France; Germany
- Languages: French; German
- Budget: €3.6 million

35 Shots of Rum (French: 35 Rhums) is a 2008 drama film directed by Claire Denis. It stars Alex Descas, Mati Diop, Nicole Dogue, and Grégoire Colin. It tells the story of a father-daughter relationship complicated by the arrival of an attractive young man. The film had its world premiere out of competition at the 65th Venice International Film Festival on 29 August 2008. It was released in France on 18 February 2009, and in Germany on 5 March 2009.

== Plot ==
Lionel (Alex Descas), a widower who drives RER trains in metropolitan Paris, has raised his daughter Josephine (Mati Diop) alone for many years. They have always shared a special bond and live a secure and contented life somewhat isolated from others, in an apartment building in a suburb of Paris. Josephine, an anthropology student, is now grown and has become a young woman, but she remains deeply devoted to her father.

They have developed a loose family with some of the other residents of the building: Gabrielle (Nicole Dogue), a cab driver, who once had a love affair with Lionel; and Noé (Grégoire Colin), a moody young man who lives with his cat and has feelings for Josephine. Noé leads a disorganised life and goes abroad often. Gabrielle appears to have feelings for Lionel and motherly feelings towards Josephine. However, both father and daughter are ambivalent toward more than a casual friendship with anyone outside their special relationship.

While attending the retirement party for a colleague and friend, Lionel declines to try the customary feat of downing 35 shots of rum. His colleague appears to be lost without his job, and Lionel realises that time is moving on. He (Lionel) must find meaning and security in things other than his present life, lest he end up the same way. During an outing with Gabrielle and Noé, their car breaks down and the four friends take refuge in a closed bar. Noé shows his feelings for Josephine, and Lionel realises that she must eventually leave him. He knows that she needs to live her own life independent of him. It is subtly suggested that Josephine decides to marry Noé in a scene of her emotionally charged visit to Noé's apartment, after he also voices his intent to take a job in Gabon.

When Lionel's former colleague commits suicide on the RER tracks, Lionel has to stop his train when he comes across the body. The father and daughter then go on a long car trip to visit her mother's grave in Germany before her wedding.

In the final scene, Josephine weds a nervous but happy Noé. At the party, Lionel successfully downs 35 shots of rum in celebration of the occasion. It is not clear whether he does so in joy or in sadness. He returns home to live alone.

== Cast ==
- Alex Descas as Lionel
- Mati Diop as Josephine
- Nicole Dogue as Gabrielle
- Grégoire Colin as Noe
- Ingrid Caven as the German aunt
- Stéphane Pocrain as the economics teacher
- Eriq Ebouaney as Blanchard
- Adèle Ado as the boss of the bar
- Cheikh Touré as the young waiter
- Mario Canonge as the pianist

== Production ==
For the film, director Claire Denis got inspiration from Yasujirō Ozu's film Late Spring, as well as a relationship between her own mother and grandfather. She wrote the screenplay with Jean-Pol Fargeau. The film was shot by Agnès Godard. Tindersticks wrote the score for the film. The Commodores song Nightshift was featured in the film.

== Release ==
The film had its world premiere out of competition at the 65th Venice International Film Festival on 29 August 2008. It was released in France on 18 February 2009, and in Germany on 5 March 2009. It was also screened at the Toronto International Film Festival and the New York Film Festival.

== Reception ==
=== Critical response ===
On review aggregator website Rotten Tomatoes, the film holds an approval rating of 97% based on 68 reviews, with a weighted average rating of 8.3/10. The website's critical consensus reads, "This slow-moving French family drama is rich, complex, subtle and emotionally eloquent." On Metacritic, the film has a weighted average score of 92 out of 100, based on 17 critics, indicating "universal acclaim".

Jay Weissberg of Variety wrote, "Claire Denis' latest may appear whisper-thin on the surface, yet it's marvelously profound, illuminating the love between a father and daughter but also highlighting the difficulty of relinquishing what most people spend a lifetime putting into place." Deborah Young of The Hollywood Reporter called it "French art house cinema at its unpretentious best."

Sight & Sound included it on the "30 Great Films of the 2000s" list. In July 2025, it ranked number 76 on Rolling Stone's list of "The 100 Best Movies of the 21st Century."

=== Accolades ===
At the 2008 Gijón International Film Festival 35 Shots of Rum was nominated as best film and won a Special Jury Prize.
