= Both Sides of the Blade =

2022 French romantic drama film

- Theatrical release poster
- French: Avec amour et acharnement
- Literally: With Love and Fury
- Directed by: Claire Denis
- Screenplay by: Christine Angot; Claire Denis
- Based on: Un tournant de la vie by Christine Angot
- Produced by: Olivier Delbosc
- Starring: Juliette Binoche; Vincent Lindon; Grégoire Colin; Bulle Ogier; Issa Perica; Alice Houri; Mati Diop; Bruno Podalydès; Lola Créton; Richard Courcet
- Cinematography: Eric Gautier
- Edited by: Sandie Bompar; Guy Lecorne; Emmanuelle Pencalet
- Music by: Tindersticks
- Production companies: Curiosa Films; Canal+; Ciné+
- Distributed by: Ad Vitam Distribution (France); Wild Bunch; Anton
- Release dates: 12 February 2022 (Berlinale); 31 August 2022 (France)
- Running time: 116 minutes
- Country: France
- Language: French
- Box office: $1.8 million

Both Sides of the Blade (formerly known in English as Fire; French: Avec amour et acharnement, lit. 'With Love and Fury') is a 2022 French romantic drama film directed by Claire Denis, who wrote the screenplay with Christine Angot. The film is based on Angot's 2018 novel Un tournant de la vie. It stars Juliette Binoche, Vincent Lindon, and Grégoire Colin. It had its world premiere on 12 February 2022 at the 72nd Berlin International Film Festival, where it competed for the Golden Bear, while Denis received the Silver Bear for Best Director.

== Plot ==
Sara and her husband Jean swim in the sea while on vacation, kissing and caressing one another. They return home to a wintry Paris, where Sara works as a radio presenter. Jean, a former professional rugby player with a prison record, is an absent father to his mixed-race teenage son Marcus, who lives in the custody of Jean's mother Nelly in the banlieue of Vitry. One day, Sara glimpses her estranged ex-boyfriend François on the street, flooding her with emotion. François, who was also once a close friend to Jean, is opening a sports agency to recruit young rugby players and contacts Jean to work with him as a talent scout. The re-entrance of François into their lives threatens the relationship Sara and Jean have had for ten years.

== Cast ==
- Juliette Binoche as Sara
- Vincent Lindon as Jean
- Grégoire Colin as François
- Bulle Ogier as Nelly
- Issa Perica as Marcus
- Alice Houri as Tribunal de Commerce Worker
- Mati Diop as Gabrielle
- Bruno Podalydès as Invité Inauguration
- Lola Créton as Lola
- Richard Courcet as Postal Worker
- Hana Magimel as Anna
- Lilian Thuram as himself

== Production ==
In early January 2021, Wild Bunch International announced the release of several French films despite the strict restrictions imposed by the COVID-19 pandemic. One of those movies would be Fire, a dramatic movie directed by Denis. That same month, it was announced that filming was about to wrap in Paris, and that Mati Diop, Bulle Ogier and Issa Perica were part of the cast, with Ad Vitam Distribution set to distribute in France. Part of the film was shot at Maison de la Radio, the headquarters of Radio France. Production wrapped in early February 2021.

The film was developed within the context and restrictions of the COVID-19 lockdowns in France, which Denis credits with bringing her and the cast closer together. However, they became "exhausted, relentless" with their work. The pandemic also exists as a reality in the film. Shooting a scene in the Paris Métro, Denis found it "impossible to pretend the pandemic didn't exist." The characters also wear face masks in some sequences taking place outside their apartment.

The film marks the acting debut of Hana Magimel, the daughter of Juliette Binoche and Benoît Magimel. French footballer Lilian Thuram appears as himself.

== Release ==
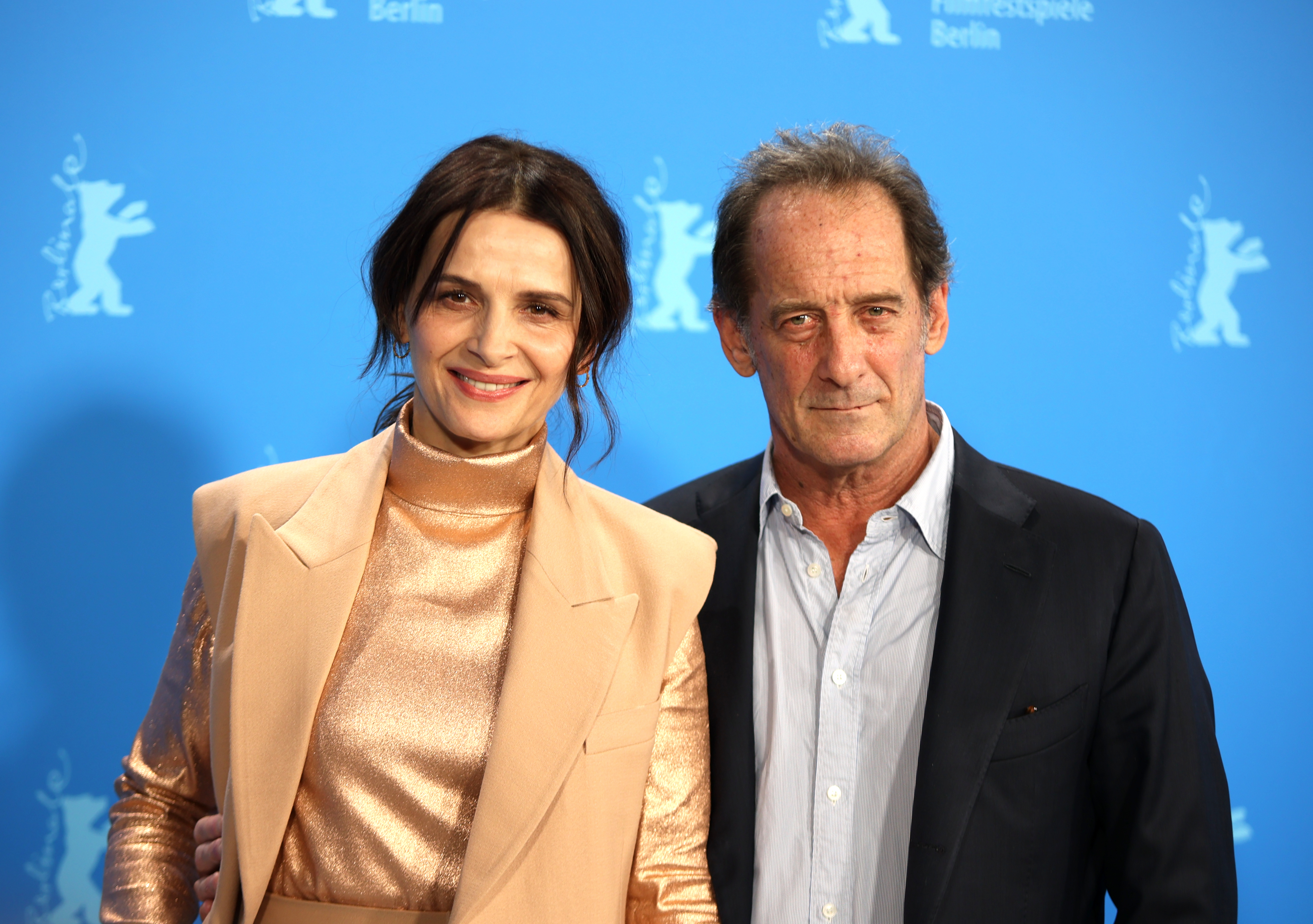
Juliette Binoche and Vincent Lindon at Berlinale 2022

The film was selected to compete for the Golden Bear in the main competition section of the 72nd Berlin International Film Festival, where the film had its world premiere on 12 February 2022. Claire Denis won the Silver Bear for Best Director. IFC Films acquired the US distribution rights to the film in early February 2022, for a limited release on 8 July 2022. It was released in France by Ad Vitam Distribution on 31 August 2022. It was released for streaming on AMC Plus on 4 November 2022, and was released on VOD by IFC Video on 15 November 2022.

=== Title ===
The title Both Sides of the Blade is derived from the song of the same name by Tindersticks, which was written by Stuart A. Staples for the film and is featured at its conclusion. When she received the song during the film's editing, Denis was impressed by the "quality" of the title and deemed the French title Avec amour et acharnement too difficult to translate. Denis described Both Sides of the Blade as the "real title" of the film because it "describes the movie" perfectly. The film was originally being marketed in English under the title Fire. Paste said there was "palpable contention" regarding the film's title. On 3 March 2022, during her introduction at the film's U.S. premiere at Lincoln Center's annual Rendez-Vous with French Cinema series, Denis herself decried, "The film is not called Fire!" Denis told an interviewer at the event, "I tried today to speak with the distribution company because I think 'Fire' is not completely fitting for the film. 'Both Sides of the Blade,' it’s sharp. There's passion, but it could be divided in a painful way. It's cutting!" In April 2022, IFC Films officially changed its distribution title to Both Sides of the Blade.

== Reception ==
=== Box office ===
Both Sides of the Blade grossed $1 million in France, $201,047 in the United States and Canada, and $540,823 in other territories for a worldwide total of $1.8 million.

In France, the film opened alongside Everything Everywhere All at Once, La Dégustation, La Page blanche and The Five Devils. The film sold 15,072 admissions on its first day, 2,924 of which were preview screenings. It went on to sell 60,282 admissions in its opening weekend, finishing 8th at the box office. At the end of its theatrical run, the film sold a total of 157,270 admissions.

=== Critical response ===
On Rotten Tomatoes, the film holds an approval rating of 84% based on 121 reviews, with an average rating of 7.1/10. The website's critical consensus reads, "Elevated by impeccable work from Claire Denis and Juliette Binoche, Both Sides of the Blade is a relationship drama that cuts deep." According to Metacritic, which assigned a weighted average score of 73 out of 100 based on 27 critics, the film received "generally favorable" reviews.

Peter Bradshaw of The Guardian gave the film three out of five stars, writing, "It's intriguing if contrived and anticlimactic, though acted at the highest pitch of sensual conviction." David Rooney of The Hollywood Reporter praised the film's "psychologically astute" screenplay, Gautier's "probing" cinematography and Denis' "laser-focused" direction for laying bare the characters' emotions "with fluid modulation of tone". Rooney also praised the film's "rigorous rejection of sentimentality" and its sex scenes for "involving middle-aged bodies captured with such unselfconscious naturalness and grace." Guy Lodge of The Guardian praised the "unusually elegant geometry" of the film's love triangle as well as Denis' "rich, nuanced exploration of female desire from the fault lines of an ostensibly simple narrative", and complimented Binoche and Lindon on the emotional range of their performances. Kevin Maher of The Times gave the film four stars out of five, writing, "Binoche, typically, is on commanding form, working once more with a film-maker who seems intuitively aware of how to harness her every glance or grimace."

=== Accolades ===
Award	Date of ceremony	Category	Recipient(s)	Result	Ref.
Berlin International Film Festival	20 February 2022	Golden Bear	Claire Denis	Nominated	
Berlin International Film Festival	20 February 2022	Silver Bear for Best Director	Claire Denis	Won	
