= I Can't Sleep (film) =

- Directed by: Claire Denis
- Written by: Claire Denis
- Produced by: Bruno Pésery
- Starring: Yekaterina Golubeva
- Cinematography: Agnès Godard
- Edited by: Nelly Quettier
- Release date: 18 May 1994
- Running time: 110 minutes
- Country: France
- Language: French
- Box office: $400,000

I Can't Sleep (French: J'ai pas sommeil) is a 1994 French drama film written and directed by Claire Denis. It was screened in the Un Certain Regard section at the 1994 Cannes Film Festival. The film was loosely inspired by the murders committed by Thierry Paulin.

== Plot ==
Daiga (Yekaterina Golubeva), a woman from Lithuania, immigrates to Paris with little money but hopes to secure herself a job as an actor. When her plans fall through, she begins work as a maid in the hotel of a friend of her great-aunt.

At the same time Theo (Alex Descas) is embroiled in a fight with his wife, as he wants to leave for Martinique with their young son while she wants to remain in Paris. He is infrequently visited by his brother, Camille.

Meanwhile, the city is on edge because of a series of violent murders that have targeted elderly women living alone. The murders are being committed by Camille and his lover. The two live in the hotel run by Daiga's employer.

Eventually Daiga begins to follow Camille around. She figures out that he is the murderer after spotting a police sketch of his face. After breaking into his room, she finds a bag of cash and steals it, leaving abruptly to go back to Lithuania.

Camille is spotted by police after one of his victims recovers enough to give a description of him. Theo is brought to the police station for questioning but insists that, far from having anything to do with the murders, he remained unaware of what his brother was doing the entire time.

== Cast ==
- Yekaterina Golubeva as Daiga
- Richard Courcet as Camille
- Vincent Dupont as Raphael
- Laurent Grévill as The doctor
- Alex Descas as Theo
- Irina Grjebina as Mina
- Tolsty as Vasily
- Line Renaud as Ninon
- Béatrice Dalle as Mona
- Sophie Simon as Alice
- Patrick Grandperret as Abel
- Didier Flamand as The Detective

== Reception ==
The film received generally positive reviews from critics, garnering a 75% fresh score on Rotten Tomatoes.
