= Alex Descas =

French actor (born 1958)

Alex Descas (born January 1, 1958) is a French actor known for his roles in films by Claire Denis and Jim Jarmusch. In France he is also known for his role as Schneider in the French TV series Un Flic.

He is a frequent collaborator of Claire Denis, appearing in more than half of her theatrical feature-length films, including No Fear, No Die, Nénette et Boni, I Can't Sleep, Trouble Every Day, The Intruder, 35 Shots of Rum and Bastards, as well as Ten Minutes Older: The Cello. He is of Antillean (Guadeloupean) descent.

== Filmography ==
Year	Title	Role	Director	Notes
1984	Asphalt Warriors	Blackies leader	Sergio Gobbi	
1985	Hell Train		Roger Hanin	
1985	Urgence		Gilles Béhat	
1986	Je hais les acteurs	Allan	Gérard Krawczyk	
1986	Bleu comme l'enfer	The black	Yves Boisset	
1986	Taxi Boy	Pascal	Alain Page	
1986	Justice de flic		Michel Gérard	
1987	Lady Cops		Josiane Balasko	
1988	Ya bon les blancs	Renault's worker	Marco Ferreri	
1988	Série noire	Jean Gallieni	Gilles Béhat (2)	
1990	No Fear, No Die	Jocelyn	Claire Denis	Nominated - César Award for Most Promising Actor
1991	Contre l'oubli	Dalton Prejean	Denis Amar	Segment: Pour Dalton Prejean, USA
1991	A Child from the South	Zeto	Sérgio Rezende	TV movie
1992	The Absence	Soldier	Peter Handke	
1993	Tout va bien dans le service	Manda	Charlotte Silvera	TV movie
1994	The Heart's Cry	Ibrahim Sow	Idrissa Ouedraogo	
1994	I Can't Sleep	Théo	Claire Denis (2)	
1995	Le grand blanc de Lambaréné	Koumba	Bassek Ba Kobhio	
1995	Portrait des hommes qui se branlent	Narrator	Vincent Ravalec	Short
1995	Le banquet		Christel Milhavet	Short
1995	Never Twice		Vincent Ravalec (2)	Short
1995	Un si joli bouquet	Barthélémy	Jean-Claude Sussfeld	TV movie
1996	Irma Vep	Desormeaux	Olivier Assayas	
1996	Clubbed to Death	Mambo	Yolande Zauberman	
1996	Nénette et Boni	The gynaecologist	Claire Denis (3)	
1996	Les Cordier, juge et flic	Sayyid	Alain Wermus	TV series (1 episode)
1997	The House		Sarunas Bartas	
1997	Saraka bô	Bataille	Denis Amar (2)	
1997	Combats de femme	Désiré	Laurent Dussaux	TV series (1 episode)
1998	Late August, Early September	Jérémie	Olivier Assayas (2)	
1998	Le serpent a mangé la grenouille	Yves Le Guen	Alain Guesnier	
1998	L'honneur de ma famille	Malcolm	Rachid Bouchareb	TV movie
1998	La poursuite du vent	John Themba	Nina Companeez	TV Mini-Series
1999	Harem Suare	Nadir	Ferzan Özpetek	
2000	Lumumba	Mobutu Sese Seko	Raoul Peck	
2001	Trouble Every Day	Léo Semenau	Claire Denis (4)	
2001	Le mal du pays	Kamanda	Laurent Bachet	Short
2002	Ten Minutes Older		Claire Denis (5)	
2002	Tèt Grenné	Richard	Christian Grandman	
2003	Coffee and Cigarettes	Alex	Jim Jarmusch	
2003	Tiresia	Marignac	Bertrand Bonello	
2003	That Woman	Denis	Guillaume Nicloux	
2003	La Beuze	Shaft	François Desagnat & Thomas Sorriaux	
2003	La nuit sera longue	François	Olivier Torres	Short
2004	The Intruder	The priest	Claire Denis (6)	
2004	Nord-Plage		José Hayot	
2004	L'homme qui venait d'ailleurs	Pierre	François Luciani	TV movie
2005	The United States of Albert (Les États-Unis d'Albert)	Nolton Barnett	André Forcier	
2005	Un couple parfait	Patrick	Nobuhiro Suwa	
2005	Nèg maron	Siwo	Jean-Claude Flamand-Barny	
2005	Dans tes rêves	Mojo	Denis Thybaud	
2005	Close-Up	Ottis	Claude Farge	Short
2007	Boarding Gate	Andrew	Olivier Assayas (3)	
2007	Kull !	Nkruma	Anders Skog	Short
2007	Déjà vu	Kiff	François Vautier	TV movie
2007	Les prédateurs	Pascal Lissouba	Lucas Belvaux	TV series (2 episodes)
2008	35 Shots of Rum	Lionel	Claire Denis (7)	
2008	On choisit pas ses parents...	Judge Mauvoisin	Thierry Binisti	TV movie
2009	Persécution	Thomas	Patrice Chéreau	
2009	Rapt	Lawyer Walser	Lucas Belvaux (2)	
2009	The Limits of Control	The Creole	Jim Jarmusch (2)	
2009	Négropolitain	Alain	Gary Pierre-Victor	Short
2009	La louve	David Santini	Bruno Bontzolakis	TV series (1 episode)
2009-12	Un flic	Schneider	Patrick Dewolf	TV series (10 episodes)
2013	Bastards	Dr. Béthanie	Claire Denis (8)	
2013	Césaire, le Prix de la Liberté	Aimé Césaire	Felix Olivier	TV movie
2013	Un enfant en danger	André	Jérôme Cornuau	TV movie
2014	Murder in Pacot	The man	Raoul Peck (2)	
2014	La vie pure	Léon Damas	Jeremy Banster	
2014	Le dos rouge	Scottie	Antoine Barraud	
2014	Voilà l'enchaînement	Him	Claire Denis (9)	Short
2016	Chocolat	Victor	Roschdy Zem	
2017	Let the Sunshine In	Marc	Claire Denis (10)	
2018	Volontaire	Albertini	Hélène Fillières	
2018	Maya	Frédéric	Mia Hansen-Løve	
2019	On ment toujours à ceux qu'on aime	Juan	Sandrine Dumas	
2022	Irma Vep	Gregory Desormeaux	Olivier Assayas (4)	TV miniseries
2025	Adam's Interest	Naïm	Laura Wandel	

== Theater ==
Year	Title	Author	Director	Notes
1991	Les Chants de Maldoror	Comte de Lautréamont	Hans-Peter Cloos	Théâtre Paris-Villette
1991	Martin Luther King ou la force d'aimer	A. Réa	A. Réa	Théâtre de la Bastille
1993	Passions secrètes	Jacques-Pierre Amette	Patrice Kerbrat	Théâtre Montparnasse
2002	The Treatment	Martin Crimp	Nathalie Richard	Théâtre national de Chaillot
2004	The Bridge of San Luis Rey	Thornton Wilder	Irina Brook	Théâtre de Sartrouville et des Yvelines
2005	L'Île des esclaves	Pierre de Marivaux	Irina Brook (2)	Théâtre de l'Atelier
2012	Race	David Mamet	Pierre Laville	Comédie des Champs-Élysées
2016	Phèdre	Jean Racine	Krzysztof Warlikowski	Théâtre de l'Odéon
