= White Material =

- Theatrical poster
- Directed by: Claire Denis
- Written by: Claire Denis; Marie NDiaye
- Starring: Isabelle Huppert; Christophe Lambert
- Cinematography: Yves Cape
- Edited by: Yann Dedet
- Music by: Stuart Staples
- Production companies: Why Not Productions; Wild Bunch; France 3 Cinéma
- Distributed by: Wild Bunch Distribution
- Release date: 6 September 2009
- Running time: 106 minutes
- Country: France
- Language: French
- Budget: $6.3 million
- Box office: $1.9 million

White Material is a 2009 French drama film directed by Claire Denis and co-written with Marie NDiaye.

The film stars Isabelle Huppert as Maria Vial, a struggling French coffee producer in an unnamed French-speaking African country, who decides to stay at her coffee plantation in spite of an erupting civil war. The film was well received, earning high ratings and appearing in several movie critics' top lists for 2010.

White Material was later voted the 97th greatest film since 2000 in an international critics' poll conducted in 2016 by BBC. In 2017 the film was named the fifteenth "Best Film of the 21st Century So Far" in The New York Times.

== Plot ==
Maria Vial is a white French farmer who runs (with her ex-husband, Andre, and his sickly father Henri) a failing coffee plantation in an unnamed African country in the present day. Maria and Andre have a lazy, mentally unstable son, Manuel. Andre also has a half-African son, Jose. Civil war has broken out and rebel soldiers, many of them child soldiers, are advancing on the area.

The French military, while pulling out, makes a final plea for Maria to leave, but she is unyielding in her desire to protect her family's home and ignores the warnings. Meanwhile, a rebel DJ on the radio urges the rebels on and advocates attacks on emblems of colonialism. Maria's workers flee for fear of the upcoming conflict. Maria stubbornly refuses to abandon the plantation and its harvest, which will be ready in five days. Risking her life and unable to find Andre, she drives to a village to hire men to finish harvesting the coffee. On the way, she is forced to pay off bandits who threaten to kill her at a roadblock. After hiring the workers, she stops at the elementary school and collects Andre's mixed-race son, Jose. Jose is an upbeat boy of about 12, and we later learn that his mother is the young housekeeper working for Andre's father.

Meanwhile, Andre is in town meeting with the African mayor, Cherif. Cherif, seeing that Andre is desperate, takes advantage of the situation and offers to purchase the plantation in exchange for cancelling Andre's debts. Cherif requires Andre to get his father to sign over the coffee plantation to him. Having returned to the plantation, Maria searches for her son Manuel and finds him in bed after midday. Trying to rouse him, she laments his listlessness and scolds that he is without purpose. Manuel rises, and after a swim, is intrigued by a noise in the house. He follows it to two young rebels. They run, and in spite of his lack of shoes, Manuel follows them far from the home. They eventually corner him; he discovers that they're armed with a spear and a machete. The rebel children threaten him, cut his hair, and retreat to the bush, firing shots from a revolver. Maria, Andre, and some workers converge on Manuel and are shocked to find him stripped and standing naked in the field. Maria loads him in the tractor and heads back to the house. Manuel, obviously traumatized and out of his mind, abandons the tractor and goes to his grandfather's home. There the heavily tattooed Manuel reacts to his assault by shaving his head, stealing his grandfather's shotgun, attacking his grandfather's housekeeper, and disappearing on his mother's motorbike.

Despite Andre's continued pleas to flee, Maria remains determined to bring in the coffee crop. She discovers the wounded rebel hero known as 'The Boxer' in a barn and feeds him. As night falls, the workers bed down and Maria falls asleep dreaming of an earlier evening. She is discussing Manuel with Cherif in what appears to be a romantic situation fueled by marijuana. Cherif warns her that her son is 'half-baked', a statement that makes her laugh. She awakens and attempts to start work again. However, the radio issues reports that the Boxer is being harbored by "foreigners" and that loyal citizens should oppose them. Her workers, hearing this, demand to be paid immediately. Upon threat, Maria opens the safe to find that the money is gone, likely taken by Andre to secure passage out of the country. Gun at her head, Maria submits to a demand to drive the workers back to the village.

Before they can reach the village, they are stopped by a band of young rebels who appear to be wearing her clothing and jewelry. The rebels demand the truck and, when a worker protests that they are just poor villagers, the rebels shoot him and drive off, leaving Maria by the roadside. Maria discovers they have looted the pharmacy and killed the doctor and his assistant. As the rebels drive the truck down the road, they are pursued by Manuel, who tells them that he knows where the Boxer is. He leads them back to the plantation, where he helps the rebels loot his own family's food store. The rebels and Manuel gorge themselves on the food and take the many pharmaceutical products that they have stolen. Almost all pass out in and around the house.

Government troops retake control of the area. They slip onto the plantation grounds, immediately in front of Andre's father, who calls out no warning to anyone inside. The troops move from room to room, slitting the throats of the child rebels who are passed out from the orgy of food and drugs. The troops lock the gun-toting Manuel in one of the farm buildings and burn him to death. Andre is shown dead on the floor of the house and holding the family passports.

In town Maria is overwrought. She is seeking a way back to the house when Cherif sees her and gives her a ride. At the plantation Maria finds Manuel's charred body. Andre's father is shown walking around the barn where Manuel was burned. Maria kills Andre's father with a machete.

At the end, one rebel leaves the area with the wounds to his head. He carries the beret of the Boxer. He tucks it into his trousers and continues into the countryside.

== Cast ==
- Isabelle Huppert as Maria Vial
- Christopher Lambert as André, her ex-husband
- Nicolas Duvauchelle as Manuel, their son
- Isaach de Bankolé as "The Boxer"
- Adèle Ado as Lucie
- Michel Subor as André's father
- William Nadylam as Chérif, the mayor
- David Gozlan as Hamudi

== Production ==
Filming was done in Foumban, Cameroon and in the Department of Noun.

== Reception ==
On Rotten Tomatoes the film has an approval rating of 86% based on reviews from 90 critics. The site's critical consensus is "Isabelle Huppert is an immoveable object surrounded by unstoppable forces in White Material, an incendiary character study and political thriller that showcases director Claire Denis' expertise in ratcheting tension." On Metacritic it has a score of 81 based on reviews from 26 critics.

Manohla Dargis of the New York Times described it as a "...powerful, agonized film". Roger Ebert was especially impressed with the performance of Isabelle Huppert,

"...small and slender, [she] embodies the strength of a fighter. In so many films, she is an indomitable force, yet you can't see how she does it. She rarely acts broadly. The ferocity lives within. Sometimes she is mysteriously impassive; we see what she's determined to do, but she sends no signals with voice or eyes to explain it."

Michael Koresky of IndieWire concurs, and also praises the ensemble cast:

"Maria is hardly the film's only character. Christophe Lambert gives a surprisingly fragile performance as her ex-husband, while Nicolas Duvauchelle is downright frightening as the beautiful, blond, lazy Manuel, who descends to peculiar pathological depths and thrusts himself into unexpected action. Meanwhile Isaach de Bankole’s elusive rebel fighter the Boxer’s sudden presence in Maria’s shed, injured, contributes to a blindsiding climactic bit of reckoning."

Kenneth Turan of the Los Angeles Times also praised the film: "Though it deals with serious political themes and confronts deep personal issues, perhaps the most unexpected thing about "White Material" is that it never forgets to add artful beauty to the mix."

=== Home media ===
A digitally restored version of the film was released on DVD and Blu-ray by The Criterion Collection in April 2011 and features new interviews with Denis and actors Isabelle Huppert and Isaach de Bankolé, a short documentary by Denis on the film's premiere at the 2010 Écrans Noirs Film Festival in Cameroon, and a deleted scene.

=== Top ten lists ===
The film has appeared on a number of critics' top ten lists of the best films of 2010.

- 1st – Guy Lodge, In Contention
- 2nd – Michael W. Phillips, Goatdog's Movies
- 3rd – Reverse Shot
- 3rd – Amy Taubin, Film Comment
- 3rd – Mike Wilmington, Movie City News
- 4th – Sean Axmaker, MSN Movies
- 5th – Mark Asch, L Magazine
- 5th – J. Hoberman, San Francisco Weekly
- 6th – Melissa Anderson, Village Voice
- 10th – Caryn James, indieWIRE
- 10th – James Rocchi, MSN Movies

=== Awards and nominations ===
- Nomination – Denver Film Critics Society Award for Best Foreign Language Film
- Nomination – Golden Lion – Claire Denis
- Nomination – Satellite Award for Best Foreign Language Film
- Nomination – Washington DC Area Film Critics Association Award for Best Foreign Language Film
