= Keep It for Yourself =

- Directed by: Claire Denis
- Written by: Claire Denis
- Produced by: Philippe Carcassonne; Ted Hope
- Starring: Sophie Simon; Sarina Chan; Michael James
- Cinematography: Agnès Godard
- Edited by: Dominique Auvray
- Music by: John Lurie
- Production companies: Allarts; Good Machine
- Release date: 1991
- Running time: 40 minutes
- Countries: United States; France; Netherlands
- Language: English

Keep It for Yourself is a 1991 black-and-white short drama film written and directed by Claire Denis.

== Plot ==
Sophie comes to New York from France with the intention of meeting up with a man she met a few months before. She finds herself alone in the man's apartment, and she discovers that he left town because he was scared stiff at the idea of seeing her.

== Cast ==
- Sophie Simon
- Sarina Chan
- Michael James
- E. J. Rodriguez
- Jim Stark
- James Schamus
- Michael Stun
- Sara Driver
- Vincent Gallo

== Notes ==
- The French director Claire Denis hired Vincent Gallo to act in several films, such as Keep It for Yourself, the made-for-TV U.S. Go Home, and its follow-up feature Nénette et Boni (1996).
- Claire Denis preferred black faces in her movies at first. "Vincent Gallo is an old face for me - the first time I shot him was 10 years ago in a short I made in New York called Keep it for Yourself".
