= Surreal Estate =

- Directed by: Eduardo de Gregorio
- Written by: Michael Graham; Eduardo de Gregorio
- Starring: Bulle Ogier; Leslie Caron; Corin Redgrave; Marie-France Pisier
- Cinematography: Ricardo Aronovich
- Edited by: Alberto Yaccelini
- Release date: 1976 (France)
- Running time: 83 min
- Country: France
- Languages: English; French

Surreal Estate (French: Sérail) is a 1976 French mystery film directed by Argentine filmmaker Eduardo de Gregorio, who is best known for his screenwriting work with Jacques Rivette.

== Plot ==
Surreal Estate tells the story of Eric Sange (Corin Redgrave), an English novelist who, seeking to buy a house in France as an investment, discovers a run-down mansion inhabited by three strange women: Ariane (Rivette regular Bulle Ogier), Agathe (Marie-France Pisier), and their ostensible housekeeper, Céleste (Leslie Caron). Together, these women draw Eric into a gothic mystery that his own novelistic experience tells him is hackneyed, but which he nonetheless finds irresistible.

== Cast ==
- Bulle Ogier as Ariane
- Marie-France Pisier as Agathe
- Corin Redgrave as Eric Sange
- Leslie Caron as Céleste
- Marylin Jones as the waitress
- Pierre Baudry as the bar owner

== Reception ==
Imran Khan of PopMatters says of the film: "Very much a film of its time, it helped to corner a market in French cinema that had seen a tiny flourish of fantasy-themed dramas first initiated by Jacques Rivette’s Céline and Julie Go Boating (1974), a film that dispensed with logic and chronology for a shattered perspective on cinematic narrative."
