= Claire Denis =

French film director (born 1946)

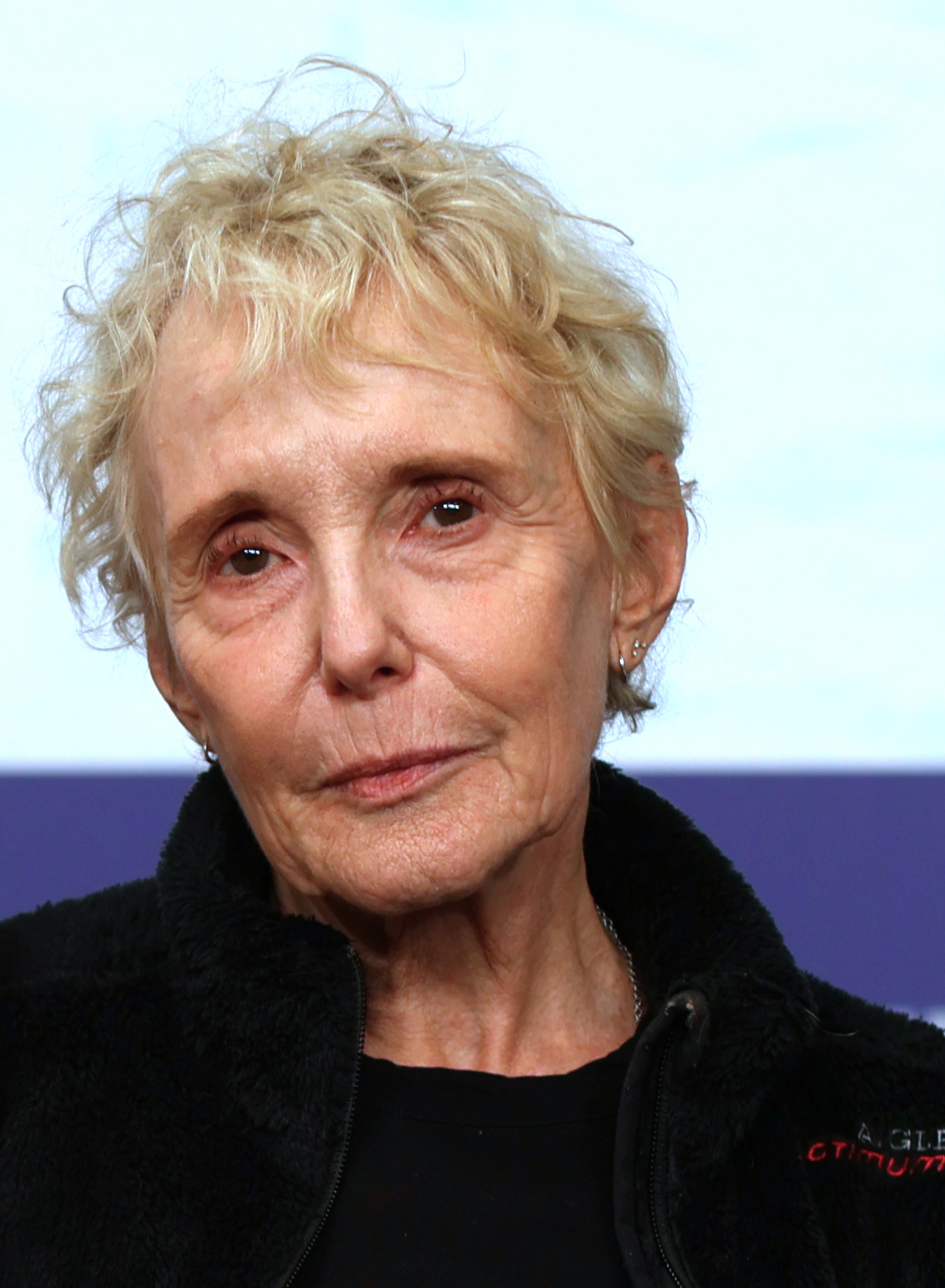
- Denis at the Berlinale 2022 where she received a Silver Bear
- Born: 21 April 1946 (age 80); Paris, France
- Education: IDHEC
- Occupations: Director, writer, professor

Claire Denis (/dəˈniː/; French: [dəni]; born 21 April 1946) is a French film director and screenwriter. Her feature film Beau Travail (1999) has been called one of the greatest films of the 1990s and of all time. Her work has dealt with themes of colonial and post-colonial West Africa, as well as issues in modern France, and continues to influence European cinematic identity.

Other acclaimed works include Trouble Every Day (2001), 35 Shots of Rum (2008), White Material (2009), High Life (2018) and Both Sides of the Blade (2022), the last of which won her the Silver Bear for Best Director at the 72nd Berlin International Film Festival. For Stars at Noon (2022), Denis won the Grand Prix at the 2022 Cannes Film Festival.

== Early life ==
Denis was born on 21 April 1946 in Paris, but raised in colonial French Africa, where her father was a civil servant, living in Burkina Faso, Cameroon, French Somaliland, and Senegal. Her childhood was spent living in West Africa with her parents and her younger sister coloured her perspective on certain political issues. Their father told them that independence from France would be a good thing for these colonies. Her upbringing was a strong influence on her films, which have dealt with colonialism and post-colonialism in Africa. Her father moved with the family every two years because he wanted the children to learn about geography.

Growing up in West Africa, Denis used to watch old and damaged copies of war films sent from the United States. As an adolescent, she loved to read. Completing the required material while in school, at night she would sneak her mother's detective stories to read. At age 12, Denis was diagnosed with polio and returned to France for treatment. She lived in Sceaux, a suburb of Paris, for the rest of her teenage years. During her time in France, she felt unfit for living in France. She was educated for a life in Africa, and felt completely different from everyone around her.

In 1969, Denis married a photographer she met at the age of 15, after being hired as his assistant. Due to the complex nature of having him in her private life but also as her teacher, they divorced soon after.

== Career ==
Denis initially studied economics, but, she has said, "It was completely suicidal. Everything pissed me off." She then briefly studied Oriental languages and married a photographer who encouraged her to quit. In 1969 Denis studied at IDHEC (L'Institut des hautes études cinématographiques – now La Fémis) with her husband's encouragement. He told her she needed to figure out what she wanted to do. She graduated from the IDHEC and since 2002 has been a professor of film at the European Graduate School in Saas-Fee, Switzerland.

Before applying and being accepted into IDHEC, she worked as an intern at Télé Niger. After telling everyone that she wanted to apply to IDHEC, they told her, "no, don't waste your time studying, all you need to do is make films here with us".

After graduating in 1971 and by this time divorced, Denis began working as an assistant director for many acclaimed filmmakers. Such films include Jacques Rivette's Out 1 (1971), Dušan Makavejev's Sweet Movie (1974), Robert Enrico's The Secret and The Old Gun (both 1974) and two further films, Eduardo de Gregorio's Surreal Estate (1976) and Costa-Gavras's Hanna K. (1983). After meeting Wim Wenders, Denis travelled to the U.S. to be the assistant director on Paris, Texas (1984), a few years later again in the States for Jim Jarmusch's Down by Law (1986), and finally a second time for Wenders on Wings of Desire (1987). Wenders has said, "Claire was more than ready to make her own films. It would have been a waste to let her continue working as an assistant director". By working with so many directors Denis realized she wanted to make her own films to have more independence and ownership of her work.

Denis's feature film debut, Chocolat (1988), is a semi-autobiographical meditation about a French woman reflecting on her childhood in Cameroon and her relationship with her family's African servant. While making it, Denis began collaborating with Jean-Pol Fargeau as a co-writer. They still work together. Chocolat was nominated for the Palme d'Or at Cannes and praised by critics and audiences as a remarkable first film.

Denis's second film, Man No Run (1989), is a documentary that follows a group of Cameroonian musicians, Les Têtes Brulées, touring France. It was considered an unusual second choice. Her next two narrative films were No Fear, No Die (S'en fout la mort, 1990) and I Can't Sleep (J'ai pas sommeil, 1994). The former is about illegal cockfighting, and the latter is about a serial killer who murders elderly women, inspired by a real case. Her next film, Nénette et Boni (1996), dives into the relationship between an alienated brother and his unhappily pregnant sister.

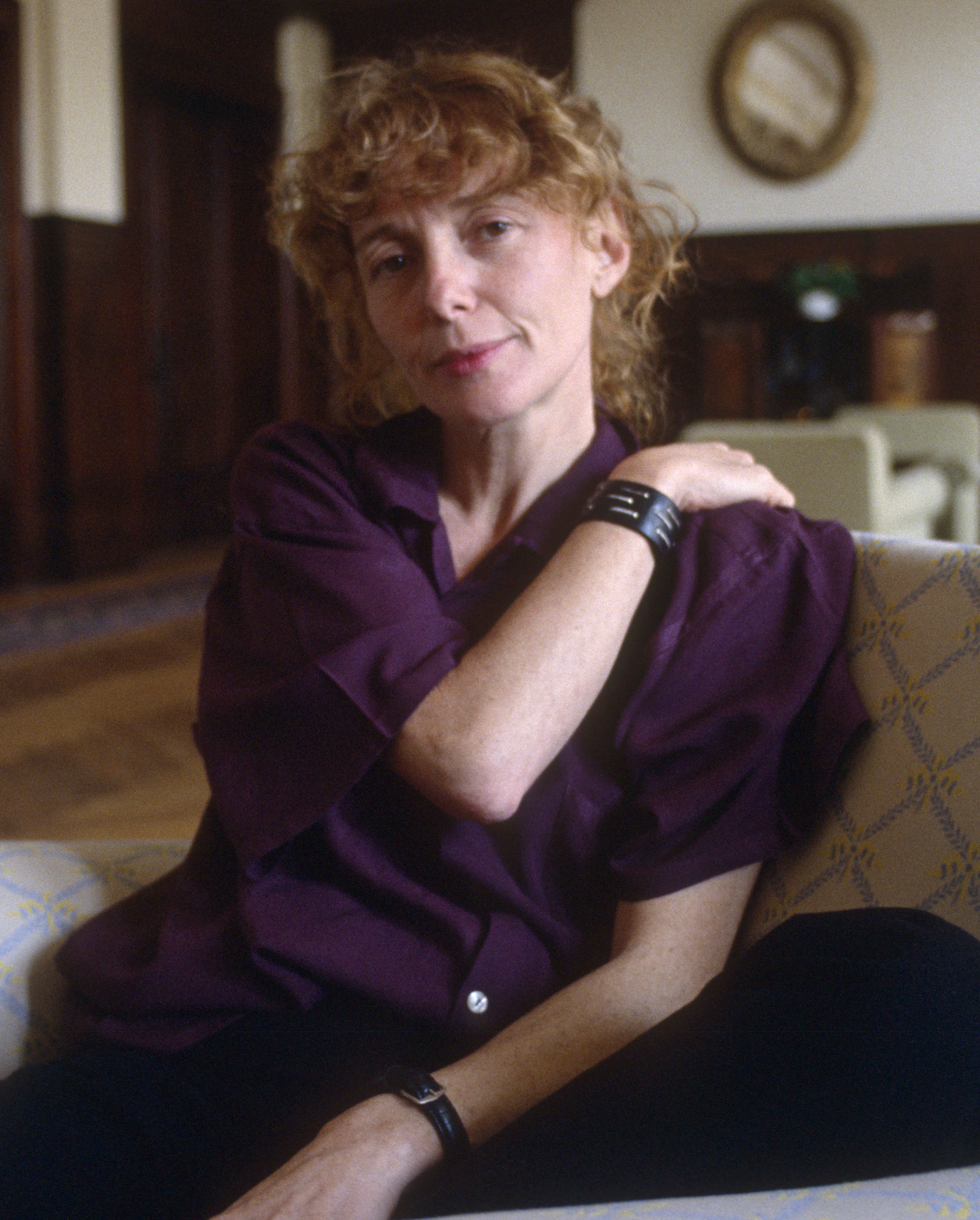
Denis in 1991

Denis's fifth and arguably most renowned film is Beau Travail (1999). It is about soldiers in the French Foreign Legion in Djibouti and loosely based on Herman Melville's Billy Budd (1888). Beau Travail explores the themes of masculinity and obsession. Her next film, Trouble Every Day (2001), was a surprise, a horror film about a newlywed couple in Paris in which the husband succumbs to sexually fueled cannibalism.

Of Denis's next six films, five draw from preexisting texts and films. Friday Night (Vendredi soir, 2002) is about two strangers who spend the night together the night before the woman is supposed to move in with her current lover. It was adapted from Emmanuèle Bernheim's novel of the same name. The Intruder (L'Intrus, 2004) is based on Jean Luc Nancy's short memoir about a man receiving a heart transplant and reconnecting with his son. 35 Shots of Rum (35 rhums, 2008) is another of Denis's most acclaimed films, about a father's and daughter's changing relationship. It was inspired by Yasujirō Ozu's film Late Spring (1949). Her film Bastards (Les Salauds, 2013) was inspired by Akira Kurosawa's The Bad Sleep Well (Warui yatsu hodo yoku nemuru, 1960). Let the Sunshine In (Un beau soleil intérieur) (2017) is a romantic comedy inspired by Roland Barthes's A Lover's Discourse: Fragments (1977). Of these, the only film not based on preexisting text is White Material (2009), which was co-written with Marie N'Diaye. It is about a white French woman in post-colonial Africa who stays during a rising civil conflict.

With films such as US Go Home (1994), Nénette et Boni, Beau Travail, Trouble Every Day, and Vendredi soir, Denis established a reputation as a filmmaker who "has been able to reconcile the lyricism of French cinema with the impulse to capture the often harsh face of contemporary France." She returned to Africa with White Material, set in an unidentified country during a civil war.

Denis has also made many short films spanning a multitude of subjects, such as Le 15 Mai (1969) while studying at IDHEC, Keep It for Yourself (1991) and Voilà l'enchaînement (2014). Her anthologies include Pour Ushari Ahmed Mahmoud, Soudan in Lest We Forget (Contre l'oubli, (1991). US Go Home (1994) is a segment in a series of hour-long films commissioned by Arte. Nice, Very Nice is a segment in À propos de Nice, la suite (1995) and Towards Nancy (Vers Nancy) in Ten Minutes Older: The Cello (2002). Her documentaries include Jacques Rivette, le veilleur (Jacques Rivette, the Watchman, 1990), Towards Mathilde (Vers Mathilde, 2005) and Venezia 70 – Future Reloaded (2013). She also made the short film Contact (2014) for a light installation by Olafur Eliasson, who helped on the production design for High Life.

Common themes in Denis's work include obsession, desire, violence, sex, and the body. It also focuses on the feelings of being an outsider and belonging. Denis has said, "For me, the monster is invisible. If there is a small thread running through all my work, it is that evil is never the other, everything is inside and never outside."

Denis is a highly collaborative filmmaker, saying in an interview, "the film becomes a relationship...and that is what's important, the relationship". The importance of collaboration can be seen throughout her work. She often recasts actors in multiple films, most notably Alex Descas, who has worked with Denis 11 times from 1990 to 2017, and Isaach de Bankolé, who appeared in three of her films from 1988 to 2009. Vincent Gallo, Béatrice Dalle, Nicolas Duvauchelle, Juliette Binoche and Grégoire Colin have also appeared in multiple Denis films. She most often collaborates with screenwriter Jean-Pol Fargeau, composer Stuart Staples of the band Tindersticks, and cinematographer Agnès Godard, whom she met in the 1970s at the Institut des hautes études cinématographiques. Asked about her screenwriting process, Denis said, "I often realize I have Isaach or Grégoire or someone else in mind" when writing scenes. She has also said that usually she "hold[s] no auditions" for her films.

Fargeau has co-written ten of Denis's screenplays. Staples has composed eight of her films and Denis has said that he "has a rapport with the body, with flesh, with desire which is very close to mine". Nelly Quettier edited I Can't Sleep, Beau Travail, Vendredi soir and The Intruder. Judy Shrewsbury has worked on every one of Denis's features for the last 20 years.

Agnès Godard is one of Denis's most important collaborators, having worked on 11 of her films as a camera operator to the cinematographer in every film except White Material and High Life.

Denis has said that by collaborating with so many artists she has learned to trust the filmmaking process. She told Damon Smith: "What I got from Jacques Rivette was a complete trust in filmmaking, in actors, in acting...and a taste for endangering myself a little bit...From Wim [Wenders], I got another kind of trust, a trust in feeling very free with the camera and in designing a film not with an aesthetic, but with a complete trust of a location, in the light of the day." She also gives actors considerable freedom. In Trouble Every Day there are two onscreen murders where she let Gallo and Dalle do what they wished after the first scripted bite.

Denis's collaborations go beyond her own films, as she has appeared in other directors' films, such as Laetitia Masson's En avoir (1995) and Tonie Marshall's Vénus beauté (1999). She shares screenwriting credit on Yousry Nasrallah's El Medina (2000). She also worked as an assistant director with Wim Wenders on Paris, Texas (1984) and Wings of Desire (1987), and with Jim Jarmusch on Down by Law (1986).

In 2005, Denis was a member of the jury at the 27th Moscow International Film Festival. In 2011, she was a member of the jury at the Deauville American Film Festival.

In 2006, Denis directed the video for the song "Incinerate" by Sonic Youth, from their album Rather Ripped.

Bastards was screened in the Un Certain Regard section at the 2013 Cannes Film Festival. Also that year, Denis was awarded the Stockholm Lifetime Achievement Award at the Stockholm Film Festival.

Denis announced in 2015 that she was partnering with Zadie Smith for her English-language debut film, High Life. Smith eventually left the project, causing a delay in filming. Denis went on to work on Let the Sunshine In, which starred Juliette Binoche and was released in 2017.

In 2018 Denis completed and released High Life, her first English-language feature film, with Robert Pattinson cast as the lead. The film premiered at the 2018 Toronto International Film Festival. It later had a limited U.S. release by American indie distributors A24. It was positively reviewed by many notable critics.

Denis has been a member of multiple film festival boards, starting with the Venice Film Festival board in 2005. In 2019, she was the president of the board of the Cinéfondation and short films at the Cannes Film Festival. In 2020, she was the president of the board of the Orizzonti section at the Venice Film Festival.

In 2025, production began on the film The Fence with Denis as director.

== Artistry ==
Most of Denis's œuvre uses location work rather than studio work. She sometimes places her actors as if they were positioned for still photography. She uses longer takes with a stationary camera and frames things in long shots, resulting in fewer close-ups. But Denis's cinematic and topical focus always remains relentlessly on her protagonists' faces and bodies. The subject's body in space, and how the particular terrain, weather, and colour of the landscape influence and interact with the human subjects of her films maintain cinematic dominance.

Tim Palmer explores Denis's work as a self-declared formalist and brilliant film stylist per se, an approach Denis has declared many times in interviews to be as much about sounds, textures, colours and compositions as broader thematic concerns or social commitments.

According to the Australian James Phillips, Denis rejects the marketable conventions of Hollywood cinema and frees the viewers of her films from the expectations of clichés.

Denis combines history with personal history, giving her films an autobiographical element. This superimposition of the personal with the historical allows her films to be described as auteur cinema. She has worked in many genres, from horror (Trouble Every Day) to romance and drama (Friday Night). Critics have noted recurring themes in her films, but Denis says she has no coherent vision of her career "trajectory".

Denis has said that she is not concerned with film theory: "I am not at all interested in theories about cinema. I am only interested in images and people and sound... Film theory is just a pain in the ass." She focuses on "human" stories, no matter the setting of the film. Denis has said she does not aim to bring about radical social change or make the viewer feel better: "I'm not so sure films should be made to soothe people's pain. I don't want to be a social worker. I want to share something that is a vision, or a feeling." Her films' main focus is on the characters, often in moments of intense violence and emotion. "Anger is part of my relation to the world," she has said. "I'm filled with anger, I'm filled with regret, I'm filled with great memories, also poetic memories."

Denis has said that the body is "central" to her work and often uses skin, blood, and other bodily fluids to symbolize characters' feelings and highlight relationships between them. In Chocolat, skin is photographed prominently to accentuate the difference between the subservient and degrading nature of the dark-skinned Proteè's forced outdoor bathing and the shameless confidence of pale, white Luc, who chooses to do so. In Trouble Every Day and High Life, bodily fluids are central to the stories, creating visceral disturbing images, and highlighting the films' "sexuality".

Denis has directed a wide variety of films that span most known genres in her 30-year career, but is known for bending a genre's rules, often not obeying traditional rules of pacing or cinematography for established genres like horror, science fiction, and fantasy, focusing instead on the characters, their psyches, emotions and relationships. Though she has made horror movies and romantic comedies and dramas, Denis has never been concerned with making the scariest, funniest, or most heartbreaking films; she is only interested in telling the human story.

Denis chooses the titles of her films carefully. Noëlle Rouxel-Cubberly argues that titles are intended to force the viewer to rethink a film's imagery and that Denis uses them to describe the raw reality of her films. For example, the title of Chocolat simultaneously refers to a racist term used during the period of the film, the cocoa exportation from Africa to Europe through a slave system, and the 1950s French expression "être chocolat", meaning "to be cheated".

Denis is also known for "shooting fast, editing slowly". In general, she does a few takes on set and spends most of her time in the editing room, creating the film there. This post-production process often involves rearranging scenes out of the order in the script. For example, she placed the dance in Beau Travail at the end of the film though it was not at the end of the script. Of this process, Denis has said, "I'm always insecure when I'm making a film. I have doubts about myself but rarely about the actors."

== Political views ==
In December 2023, alongside 50 other filmmakers, Denis signed an open letter published in Libération demanding a ceasefire and an end to the killing of civilians amid the 2023 Gaza war, and for a humanitarian corridor into Gaza to be established for humanitarian aid and the release of hostages.

== Filmography ==
=== Feature films ===
| Year | English title | Original title | Notes |
|---|---|---|---|
| 1988 | Chocolat | | |
| 1990 | No Fear, No Die | S'en fout la mort | |
| 1994 | US Go Home | | TV movie |
| 1994 | I Can't Sleep | J'ai pas sommeil | |
| 1996 | Nenette and Boni | Nénette et Boni | |
| 1999 | Beau Travail | | |
| 1999 | The City | La ville | |
| 2001 | Trouble Every Day | | |
| 2002 | Friday Night | Vendredi soir | |
| 2004 | The Intruder | L'intrus | |
| 2008 | 35 Shots of Rum | 35 rhums | |
| 2009 | White Material | | |
| 2013 | Bastards | Les Salauds | |
| 2017 | Let the Sunshine In | Un beau soleil intérieur | |
| 2018 | High Life | | |
| 2022 | Both Sides of the Blade | Avec amour et acharnement | |
| 2022 | Stars at Noon | | |
| 2025 | The Fence | Le Cri des Gardes | |

=== Short films ===
| Year | Title | Notes |
|---|---|---|
| 1969 | Le 15 Mai | IDHEC film, based on Frederik Pohl's The Tunnel under the World |
| 1991 | Contre l'oubli / Against Oblivion | |
| 1991 | Keep It for Yourself | |
| 1993 | La robe à cerceau / Monologues | TV series |
| 1994 | Boom-Boom | |
| 1995 | À propos de Nice, la suite | Segment: Nice, Very Nice |
| 1997 | We, France's Undocumented Immigrants | |
| 2002 | Ten Minutes Older: The Cello | Segment: Vers Nancy / Towards Nancy |
| 2010 | On bosse ici! On vit ici! On reste ici! | co-director |
| 2011 | To the Devil | |
| 2013 | Venezia 70 - Future Reloaded | Segment: Claire Denis |
| 2014 | Contact | |
| 2014 | Voilà l'enchaînement | |

=== Documentary films ===
| Year | Title | Original title | Notes |
|---|---|---|---|
| 1972 | New Reports from France | Chroniques de France N° 77 | Segment "Magic Circus, burlesque" |
| 1973 | New Reports from France | Chroniques de France N° 87 | Segment "Bibliothèque modèle pour enfants, Clamart" |
| 1989 | Man No Run | | |
| 1990 | Jacques Rivette, the Watchman | Jacques Rivette, le veilleur | |
| 2005 | The Breidjing Camp | | TV documentary |
| 2005 | Towards Mathilde | Vers Mathilde | |

=== Second unit director or assistant director ===
| Year | Title | Role | Notes |
|---|---|---|---|
| 1974 | The Secret | second assistant director | |
| 1974 | Sweet Movie | second assistant director | |
| 1975 | The Old Gun | second assistant director | |
| 1975 | The Golden Mass | second assistant director | |
| 1976 | Surreal Estate | first assistant director | |
| 1979 | Mais où et donc Ornicar | first assistant director | |
| 1979 | Zoo zéro | first assistant director | |
| 1979 | Return to the Beloved | assistant director | |
| 1980 | Pile ou face | assistant director | |
| 1980 | The Imprint of Giants | assistant director | |
| 1981 | We're Not Angels... Neither Are They | assistant director | |
| 1982 | The Passerby | first assistant director | |
| 1983 | Hanna K. | first assistant director | |
| 1983 | Le bâtard | first assistant director | |
| 1984 | To Catch a King | first assistant director | TV movie |
| 1984 | Paris, Texas | assistant director | |
| 1986 | Down by Law | assistant director | |
| 1987 | Wings of Desire | first assistant director | |

== Accolades ==
| Year | Festival | Award | Film | Result | Notes |
|---|---|---|---|---|---|
| 1988 | Cannes Film Festival | Palme d'Or | Chocolat | Nominated | |
| 1989 | César Awards | Best First Feature Film | Chocolat | Nominated | |
| 1990 | Venice Film Festival | Golden Lion | No Fear, No Die | Nominated | |
| 1994 | Torino International Festival of Young Cinema | FIPRESCI Prize – Special Mention | Tous les garçons et les filles de leur âge... | Won | |
| 1994 | Cannes Film Festival | Un Certain Regard | J'ai Pas Sommeil | Nominated | |
| 1996 | Locarno International Film Festival | Golden Leopard | Nenette and Boni | Won | |
| 1996 | Locarno International Film Festival | Prize of the Ecumenical Jury – Special Mention | Nenette and Boni | Won | |
| 1996 | Namur International Festival of French-Speaking Film | Golden Bayard for Best Artistic Contribution | Nenette and Boni | Won | |
| 1996 | Namur International Festival of French-Speaking Film | Namur International Festival of French-Speaking Film | Nenette and Boni | Nominated | |
| 1998 | Independent Spirit Awards | Independent Spirit Award for Best Foreign Film | Nenette and Boni | Nominated | |
| 2000 | Berlin International Film Festival | Reader Jury of the "Berliner Zeitung" – Special Mention | Beau Travail | Won | |
| 2001 | Chicago Film Critics Association | Best Foreign Language Film | Beau Travail | Nominated | |
| 2001 | Rotterdam International Film Festival | KNF Award – Special Mention | Beau Travail | Won | |
| 2001 | Namur International Festival of French-Speaking Film | Golden Bayard for Best Film | Trouble Every Day | Nominated | |
| 2001 | Sitges - Catalan International Film Festival | Best Film | Trouble Every Day | Nominated | |
| 2001 | Ghent International Film Festival | Grand Prix | The Intruder | Nominated | |
| 2004 | Venice Film Festival | Golden Lion | The Intruder | Nominated | |
| 2005 | Tribeca Film Festival | Best Documentary Feature | Vers Mathilde | Nominated | |
| 2009 | Venice Film Festival | Golden Lion | White Material | Nominated | |
| 2011 | National Society of Film Critics | Best Foreign Language Film | White Material | 3rd place | |
| 2013 | Adelaide Film Festival | Best Feature | Bastards | Nominated | |
| 2013 | Cannes Film Festival | Un Certain Regard | Bastards | Nominated | |
| 2013 | Village Voice Film Poll | Best Director | Bastards | Nominated | |
| 2014 | Zurich Film Festival | A Tribute To... Award | Lifetime Achievement | Won | |
| 2015 | La Cabina Valencia International Medium-Length Film Festival | La Cabina Award | Voilà l'enchaînement | Nominated | |
| 2017 | Cannes Film Festival | SACD Prize | Let the Sunshine In | Won | |
| 2017 | Film by the Sea International Film Festival | Le Prix TV5Monde | Let the Sunshine In | Nominated | |
| 2017 | Munich Film Festival | Best International Film | Let the Sunshine In | Nominated | |
| 2018 | International Online Cinema Awards (INOCA) | Best Non-English Language Film | Let the Sunshine In | Nominated | |
| 2019 | Dublin Film Critics Circle | Best Director | High Life | Nominated | |
| 2019 | International Online Cinema Awards (INOCA) | Best Director | High Life | Nominated | |
| 2019 | Jerusalem Film Festival | Best International Film | High Life | Nominated | |
| 2019 | Women Film Critics Circle | Best Woman Storyteller | High Life | Nominated | |
| 2020 | San Sebastián International Film Festival | Golden Shell for Best Film | High Life | Nominated | |
| 2020 | San Sebastián International Film Festival | FIPRESCI Prize | High Life | Won | |
| 2021 | Prix Jean Vigo | Honorary Jean Vigo Award | Herself | Honored | |
| 2022 | Morelia International Film Festival | Artistic Excellence Award | Herself | Honored | |
| 2022 | Berlin International Film Festival | Golden Bear for Best Film | Both Sides of the Blade | Nominated | |
| 2022 | Berlin International Film Festival | Silver Bear for Best Director | Both Sides of the Blade | Won | |
| 2022 | Cannes Film Festival | Grand Prix | Stars at Noon | Won | |
