= Nénette and Boni =

1996 film

- French: Nénette et Boni
- Directed by: Claire Denis
- Written by: Claire Denis; Jean-Pol Fargeau
- Starring: Grégoire Colin; Alice Houri
- Cinematography: Agnès Godard
- Edited by: Yann Dedet
- Music by: Tindersticks
- Distributed by: Pyramide Distribution
- Release dates: 1996 (Locarno); 29 January 1997 (France)
- Running time: 103 minutes
- Country: France
- Language: French

Nénette and Boni (French: Nénette et Boni) is a 1996 French drama film directed by Claire Denis, written by Denis in collaboration with Jean-Pol Fargeau.

== Plot ==
After the death of his mother, Boni moves his friends into her house and begins work selling pizzas. He entertains violent sexual fantasies about a baker who lives nearby. He is visited by his younger sister Nénette, whom he is estranged from, who reveals that she is pregnant and moves into his home against his wishes.

Reluctantly, Boni begins to take his sister to doctor's appointments where they learn it is too late for her to have an abortion. As Boni gradually warms to the idea of being an uncle, Nénette looks into having a Jane Doe birth which will allow her to give birth anonymously and have the child adopted immediately. However, after Boni insults her for considering the option she attempts to abort the child at home, passing out before being rescued by Boni.

At the hospital Nénette bans Boni from the birth of her child, but he returns later, armed with a gun, and kidnaps his nephew, bringing him home to take care of him.

== Cast ==
- Grégoire Colin as Boni
- Alice Houri as Nénette
- Jacques Nolot as Monsieur Luminaire
- Valeria Bruni Tedeschi as Baker's wife
- Vincent Gallo as Vincenzo Brown
- Malek Brahimi as Malek
- Gérard Meylan as The Uncle
- Alex Descas as The gynaecologist

== Release ==
The film had its world premiere at the 1996 Locarno Festival. It was released in France on 29 January 1997 on 41 screens and grossed $145,920 in its opening week, opening at 14th at the French box office. The soundtrack to the film, created by Tindersticks, was released in 1996.

== Reception ==
=== Critical response ===
On review aggregator website Rotten Tomatoes, the film holds an approval rating of 86% based on 14 reviews, with a weighted average rating of 7.3/10. On Metacritic, the film has a weighted average score of 70 out of 100, based on 10 critics, indicating "generally favorable reviews".

Roger Ebert gave the film 3 out of 4 stars, calling it "one of those movies that is saturated with sensuality but not with explicit detail." Derek Elley of Variety wrote, "In a change of tack from her previous pics, Denis adopts a patchwork of styles that gives the movie an irreal, highly metaphysical flavor."

=== Accolades ===
| Award | Year of ceremony | Category | Recipient(s) | Result | Ref(s) |
|---|---|---|---|---|---|
| Locarno Festival | 1996 | Golden Leopard | Nénette and Boni | Won | |
| Locarno Festival | 1996 | Best Actor | Grégoire Colin | Won | |
| Locarno Festival | 1996 | Best Actress | Valeria Bruni Tedeschi | Won | |
| Locarno Festival | 1996 | Special Mention: Prize of the Ecumenical Jury | Nénette and Boni | Won | |
| Independent Spirit Awards | 1998 | Best International Film | Nénette and Boni | Nominated | |
