= High Life (2018 film) =

Science fiction film by Claire Denis

- Theatrical release poster
- Directed by: Claire Denis
- Written by: Claire Denis; Jean-Pol Fargeau
- Produced by: Andrew Lauren; D.J. Gugenheim; Claudia Steffen; Christoph Friedel; Laurence Clerc; Olivier Théry-Lapiney; Oliver Dungey; Klaudia Śmieja-Rostworowska
- Starring: Robert Pattinson; Juliette Binoche; André Benjamin; Mia Goth
- Cinematography: Yorick Le Saux
- Edited by: Guy Lecorne
- Music by: Stuart A. Staples
- Production companies: Andrew Lauren Productions; Pandora Filmproduktion; Alcatraz Films; The Apocalypse Films Company; Madants; BFI; Arte; ZDF; Canal+; Ciné+
- Distributed by: Wild Bunch (France); Pandora Filmproduktion (Germany); Thunderbird Releasing (United Kingdom); Against Gravity (Poland); A24 (United States)
- Release dates: 9 September 2018 (TIFF); 7 November 2018 (France)
- Running time: 110 minutes
- Countries: France; Germany; Poland; United Kingdom; United States
- Language: English
- Budget: €8 million
- Box office: $2.8 million

High Life is a 2018 science fiction film directed by Claire Denis, in English, written by Denis and her long-time collaborator Jean-Pol Fargeau. Starring Robert Pattinson and Juliette Binoche, it focuses on a group of criminals sent on a space mission toward a black hole while taking part in scientific experiments.

Physicist and black hole expert Aurélien Barrau was hired as a consultant, and Danish-Icelandic artist Olafur Eliasson designed the film's spacecraft. High Life premiered on 9 September 2018 at the Toronto International Film Festival.

== Plot ==
A group of criminals serving death sentences are sent on a mission in space to extract alternative energy from a black hole. Each prisoner is treated as a guinea pig by Dibs, a scientist, for her experiments; Dibs is fixated on trying to create a child in space through artificial insemination, but has yet to succeed. Sexual activity between prisoners is prohibited.

The ship is equipped with "The Box", a device in a small room that is obsessively used by the crew to masturbate, while Dibs administers sedatives to the passengers. Monte, the only celibate prisoner, rejects Dibs' sexual advances. He is serving a life sentence for manslaughter as a child. Monte's only friend on the ship is Tcherny, who is drawn to the onboard garden because it reminds him of life back on Earth.

Pregnant prisoner Elektra delivers a baby, who dies later before she does as well. The captain, Chandra, develops leukemia from radiation and has a stroke before being euthanized by Dibs. One night, male prisoner Ettore attempts to rape Boyse. Nansen, the pilot, intervenes, but Ettore attacks and overpowers her. Monte arrives, throws Ettore off Boyse, and beats him. When Monte leads Boyse away to be treated, Mink stabs Ettore to death in the hallway. Dibs begins doubling the amount of sedatives each prisoner receives, later sneaking into Monte's cell and raping him while he is sedated, something Nansen witnesses. She then injects his semen into Boyse, who produces a healthy child that Dibs dotes on, but Monte is unaware that he is the baby's father.

As the ship approaches the black hole, Nansen prepares to pilot a shuttle around it. Unbeknownst to the other prisoners, Boyse kills Nansen with a shovel and takes her place. The shuttle travels through a molecular cloud that alters its trajectory and causes it to dive into the black hole, where Boyse dies gruesomely due to spaghettification. Mink later attacks Dibs and injures her, but is then killed by Monte with the shovel to defend Dibs. Dibs informs him that the child is his before ejecting herself into space. Tcherny commits suicide and Monte buries his body in the garden according to his wishes. Now the only survivor, Monte removes the bodies from the ship's morgue, dresses them in spacesuits, and releases them into the vacuum of space.

Monte struggles to raise the child, whom he has named Willow. He attempts to make repairs to the ship, but her frantic cries through his helmet speakers cause him to drop a tool and lose it in space. Much later, when Willow has grown into a teenager, they encounter another ship similar to their own. Monte boards the ship, but finds it carrying stray dogs who have survived by eating one another. Willow begs Monte to bring one back, but he refuses, implying contamination could potentially sicken or kill them. The ship moves closer to the black hole, and Willow convinces Monte to board a shuttle with her and execute the Penrose process that, if successful, is supposed to slingshot them away from the black hole. No longer wearing space suits, Monte takes Willow's hand, and they walk together to a yellow light source that grows ever larger and envelops them.

== Cast ==
- Robert Pattinson as Monte
  - Mikołaj Fogt Gruss as young Monte
- Juliette Binoche as Dibs
- André Benjamin as Tcherny
- Mia Goth as Boyse
- Agata Buzek as Nansen
- Lars Eidinger as Chandra
- Claire Tran as Mink
- Ewan Mitchell as Ettore
- Gloria Obianyo as Elektra
- Victor Banerjee as Indian Professor
- Jessie Ross as Willow
  - Scarlett Lindsey as baby Willow

== Production ==
=== Background ===
Claire Denis had the idea of the project in her mind for fifteen years. She said, "I had a screenplay which was naturally in English, because the story takes place in space and, I don't know why, but for me, people speak English—or Russian or Chinese—but definitely not French in space."

High Life was initiated by producer Oliver Dungey of London-based The Apocalypse Films Company when he approached Denis to make a film in English on the theme of Femme Fatale. The film was co-produced by Alcatraz Films from Paris, The Apocalypse Films Company from London, Pandora Film Produktion from Cologne, and Madants from Warsaw as a French-German-British-Polish co-production, with financing from New York-based Andrew Lauren Productions and various European funds.

Novelist Nick Laird co-wrote the screenplay for the film along with Denis, Fargeau and Geoff Cox. Laird's wife Zadie Smith also contributed to early drafts of the English version of the screenplay. Due to creative differences between Denis and Smith, Laird and Smith dropped out of the project as screenwriters, but Laird later served as the consultant for the script.

Denis went to the European Space Agency's Astronaut Centre in Cologne to learn about human spaceflight exploration before the film started shooting.

Denis explained the practical reasons for the non-linear story, saying "I always wanted it to start with a man and a baby, as a ritual of two living persons with no despair in that moment. And then there would be the flashbacks bringing in all the despair." Denis compared Pattinson's character to the knight Perceval of Arthurian legend, and Binoche's character to Medea from the Greek tragedy.

=== Casting ===
During the project's early stages, Denis had Vincent Gallo in mind for the lead role, and wrote the film thinking of Philip Seymour Hoffman. The project later caught the attention of Robert Pattinson; according to Denis:

Pattinson contacted the person who was doing the English casting. I was intrigued but I thought he was too young. Every time I went to London to meet some actors, he was there. His desire to work with me has never faltered. And now he is a little less young and it's perfect. […] It's strange, though, because it would be difficult to imagine anyone more unlike Philip Seymour Hoffman physically, but Robert is very enigmatic, with a powerful presence. He gives off an aura that immediately makes you want to film him.

Pattinson described his character as an astronaut and said, "He's a criminal who volunteers for a mission toward a black hole, but he realizes along the way that a doctor on board also wants to do sexual experimentation with humans in space." In late 2015, Patricia Arquette and Mia Goth joined the cast. In September 2017, Arquette dropped out while the rest of the cast, including Juliette Binoche and rapper André 3000, were also announced. Playing the role of baby Willow is Scarlett Lindsey, Pattinson's goddaughter. After Pattinson was unable to bond with the babies cast as Willow, he remembered that Lindsey was friendly around adults. Pattinson asked a favour of Lindsey's father to cast her in the film, which he described as a "massive gamble" that was ultimately paid off by her "incredible" performance.

=== Filming ===
Principal photography began in Cologne, Germany on 4 September 2017. The Polish part of the shooting took place in Białystok. Filming wrapped in late October 2017.

== Soundtrack ==
The soundtrack to High Life was composed by Stuart A. Staples of the English band Tindersticks.

== Release ==
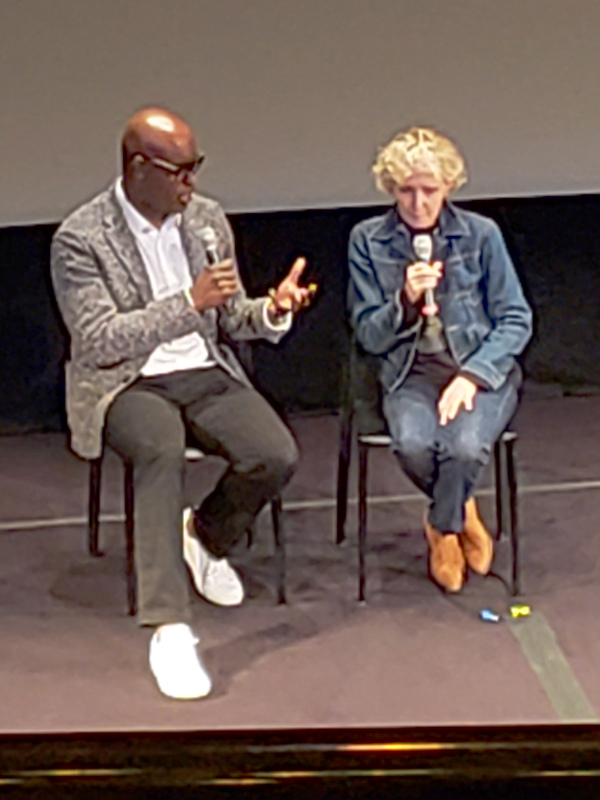
Claire Denis (right) presenting High Life at the 2018 Toronto International Film Festival.

Following its world premiere at the 2018 Toronto International Film Festival, the film competed in main competition at the 66th San Sebastián International Film Festival in late September 2018. The film had its theatrical release in France on 7 November 2018 and in the United Kingdom on 10 May 2019. A24 acquired U.S. distribution rights to the film. The film was released in the United States on 5 April 2019. It was later given a Blu-Ray/DVD release in North American retailers.

== Reception ==
=== Critical response ===
On review aggregation website Rotten Tomatoes, 83% of critics have given the film a positive review based on 235 reviews, with an average rating of 7.4/10. The website's critics consensus reads, "High Life is as visually arresting as it is challenging, confounding, and ultimately rewarding – which is to say it's everything film fans expect from director Claire Denis." On Metacritic, the film has a weighted average score of 78 out of 100 based on reviews from 42 critics, indicating "generally favorable" reviews.

David Ehrlich of IndieWire gave the film an A− grade, saying it owed more to Solaris than Star Wars and describing it as "a pensive and profound study of human life on the brink of the apocalypse." Jessica Kiang of Variety called it "extraordinary, difficult, hypnotic, and repulsive". Charles Bramesco of The Guardian gave the film 5 stars out of 5, saying Denis had reconfigured the genre's "familiar components to create a startlingly fresh engagement with the question of what it means to be human." Steve MacFarlane of Slant Magazine wrote: "The film asks down-and-dirty questions about what really resides beneath thousands of years of human progress, a savage and haunting antidote to the high-minded idealism of movies like Christopher Nolan's Interstellar and Ridley Scott's The Martian." Matt Zoller Seitz of RogerEbert.com described it as "tailor-made for viewers who like science fiction in a cryptic 1970s art-house mode."

In France, Le Monde and Libération described High Life as a "masterpiece".

=== Accolades ===
Award	Date of ceremony	Category	Recipients	Result	Ref.
San Sebastián International Film Festival	29 September 2018	Best Film	High Life	Nominated	
San Sebastián International Film Festival	29 September 2018	FIPRESCI Award	High Life	Won	
Film Fest Gent	19 October 2018	Best Film	High Life	Nominated	
Film Fest Gent	19 October 2018	Georges Delerue Award	Stuart A. Staples	Won	
Louis Delluc Prize	12 December 2018	Best Film	High Life	Nominated	
