= Let the Sunshine In (film) =

- Film poster
- French: Un beau soleil intérieur
- Directed by: Claire Denis
- Written by: Claire Denis; Christine Angot
- Produced by: Olivier Delbosc
- Starring: Juliette Binoche
- Cinematography: Agnès Godard
- Edited by: Guy Lecorne
- Music by: Stuart A. Staples
- Distributed by: Curiosa Films
- Release dates: 18 May 2017 (Cannes); 27 September 2017 (France)
- Running time: 94 minutes
- Country: France
- Language: French
- Box office: $4.2 million

Let the Sunshine In (French: Un beau soleil intérieur), or Bright Sunshine In, is a 2017 French romantic drama film directed by Claire Denis and starring Juliette Binoche. It opened the Directors' Fortnight section of the 2017 Cannes Film Festival. At Cannes, it won the SACD Award.

== Plot ==
Isabelle, a middle-aged divorced artist, has an unsatisfying relationship with a married banker, Vincent, who enjoys sex with her but is committed emotionally to his wife. Looking for love, she begins a series of other relationships.

She meets and feels an instant connection with an actor who, after she sleeps with him, implies he is not separated from his wife despite what he had said earlier. She begins sleeping with her ex-husband but picks a fight, ending their relationship. Isabelle is wooed eventually by Marc, influential in the art world, who says he wants things to progress slowly and offers a serious relationship. However, Isabelle sees a psychic, who tells her that, although the relationship will not last, she should keep looking for the right man.

== Cast ==
- Juliette Binoche as Isabelle
- Xavier Beauvois as Vincent
- Philippe Katerine as Mathieu
- Josiane Balasko as Maxime
- Sandrine Dumas as Ariane
- Nicolas Duvauchelle as The actor
- Alex Descas as Marc
- Laurent Grévill as François
- Bruno Podalydès as Fabrice
- Paul Blain as Sylvain
- Gérard Depardieu as Denis, the clairvoyant
- Valeria Bruni Tedeschi as Woman in car

== Production ==
The film is based on themes from Roland Barthes's 1977 text A Lover's Discourse: Fragments (French: Fragments d’un discours amoureux). Denis initially considered adapting Barthes' book into a film, and ultimately just used it as a source of inspiration. The screenplay was co-written by the director with novelist Christine Angot.

Shooting began in January 2017 in Creuse, France. Shooting wrapped on 21 February 2017. The film was shot by Agnès Godard. Etta James' version of the song "At Last" was used in the film.

== Release ==
The film had its world premiere as the opening film of the Directors' Fortnight section at the 2017 Cannes Film Festival on 18 May 2017. It was released in France on 27 September 2017.

== Critical reception ==
On review aggregator Rotten Tomatoes, the film holds an approval rating of 86% based on 140 reviews, with a weighted average rating of 7.3/10. The website's critical consensus reads, "Let the Sunshine In pairs a powerful performance from Juliette Binoche with a layered drama that presents director Claire Denis at her most assured." On Metacritic, the film has a weighted average score of 79 out of 100, based on 33 critics, indicating "generally favorable reviews".

Glenn Kenny of RogerEbert.com gave the film 4 stars out of 4, saying, "the film does confront the fact that particularly for women, pursuing desire in middle age is a fraught path." Greg Cwik of Slant Magazine called it "the most empathetic, heartfelt film of [Claire Denis'] illustrious career."

== Accolades ==
Award	Date of ceremony	Category	Recipient(s)	Result	Ref(s)
Cannes Film Festival	26 May 2017	SACD Award	Let the Sunshine In	Won	
European Film Awards	9 December 2017	Best Actress	Juliette Binoche	Nominated	
Lumière Awards	5 February 2018	Best Actress	Juliette Binoche	Nominated	
César Award	2 March 2018	Best Actress	Juliette Binoche	Nominated	
