= Clubbed to Death (film) =

- Directed by: Yolande Zauberman
- Written by: Yolande Zauberman; Noémie Lvovsky; Emmanuel Salinger
- Produced by: Odile Gervais
- Starring: Élodie Bouchez; Roschdy Zem; Béatrice Dalle; Alex Descas
- Cinematography: Denis Lenoir
- Edited by: François Gedigier
- Music by: Philippe Cohen-Solal
- Production company: Animatógrafo
- Distributed by: Pierre Grise Distribution
- Release date: 1996
- Running time: 90 minutes
- Countries: France; Portugal; Netherlands
- Language: French
- Budget: $3.8 million
- Box office: $110.000

Clubbed to Death (also known as Lola or Clubbed to Death (Lola)) is a 1996 French film starring Élodie Bouchez, directed by Yolande Zauberman, and co-written by Zauberman and Noémie Lvovsky. The film concerns a love triangle that forms between 20-year-old Lola (Bouchez) and the couple she encounters at an all-night rave.

== Cast ==
- Élodie Bouchez as Lola
- Roschdy Zem as Emir
- Béatrice Dalle as Saida
- Richard Courcet as Ismael
- Gérald Thomassin as Paul
- Luc Lavandier as Pierre
- Alex Descas as Mambo
- Julie Bataille as Johanna
- Philippe Roux as Bus Driver
