= Bastards (2013 film) =

2013 film

- Theatrical release poster
- French: Les Salauds
- Directed by: Claire Denis
- Screenplay by: Claire Denis; Jean-Pol Fargeau
- Produced by: Brahim Chioua; Laurence Clerc; Olivier Thery-Lapiney
- Starring: Vincent Lindon; Chiara Mastroianni
- Cinematography: Agnès Godard
- Edited by: Annette Dutertre
- Music by: Stuart A. Staples
- Production companies: Arte France Cinéma; Canal+; Ciné+; CNC; Pandora Filmproduktion; Wild Bunch; ZDF/Arte
- Distributed by: Wild Bunch (France); Real Fiction (Germany)
- Release dates: 21 May 2013 (Cannes); 7 August 2013 (France); 26 December 2013 (Germany)
- Running time: 100 minutes
- Countries: France; Germany
- Languages: French; English
- Budget: $3.9 million
- Box office: $660,000

Bastards (French: Les Salauds) is a 2013 thriller film directed by Claire Denis. It stars Vincent Lindon and Chiara Mastroianni. It was screened in the Un Certain Regard section at the 2013 Cannes Film Festival.

== Plot ==
Marco Silvestri is an oil tanker captain who works abroad and now has little contact with his sister, Sandra. Sandra is married to his best friend, Jacques, and lives in Paris with their daughter Justine. Marco is divorced and his two daughters live with their mother in the Vendee.

Sandra asks Marco to return after her husband commits suicide. Marco agrees and gives up his job to do so. It emerges that Sandra and her husband’s women’s shoe manufacturing business, inherited from Marco's and Sandra's father, faces bankruptcy. Marco willingly gave up his share of the inheritance and has avoided getting involved in the business previously.

Adding to the family crisis, Justine, who has a history of drug and alcohol abuse and self-harm, has been hospitalized for internal injuries from sexual abuse and torture. The doctor is considering an operation to repair her damaged vagina, but Justine wants to leave the hospital.

Sandra blames an off-the-books major creditor, Edouard Laporte, a wealthy businessman, for her husband’s death and feels guilty for allowing Laporte to use her daughter as a sexual object. Marco notes that the product quality was poor and feels that his sister and brother-in-law brought their financial difficulties on themselves, but he shares her anger at Laporte.

Marco moves into an apartment in the same building as Laporte, in a wealthy area, and begins an affair with Laporte’s younger wife, Raphaëlle, after helping their young son, Joseph, change a bike tire. He leaves his flat unfurnished and sells his watch, life insurance policy, and car to pay the other creditors. Sandra gives him their father’s handgun and says that he will need it.

Sandra arranges for them to visit a farm building used for the sex party where Justine was hurt. Marco gives the pimp and prostitute who organize the parties, Xavier and Elysée, a large sum of cash so they'll let him into the building. He finds a bloodied corncob and assaults Xavier in his fury. Later, two men attack Marco outside his apartment, injuring his hand. He attempts to ambush Laporte, but Laporte does not appear.

Sandra and Marco are alerted that Justine has escaped the hospital. Sandra doesn't not want the police to be involved, but they later find Justine wandering naked down a nearby street. She escapes the hospital again and hides with Xavier and Elysée, evading Marco's search for her.

Still looking for clues as to what happened, Marco visits an internet cafe where Xavier sells him images of Justine arriving at the sex club with Laporte and Jacques. Marco confronts Sandra with the images, screaming at her for her involvement and for lying to him.

After discovering Raphaëlle and Marco are sleeping together, Laporte leaves her, taking Joseph with him. Laporte has left Raphaëlle a letter saying that he doesn't mind her cheating but he doesn't want his son involved with Marco and his family. Raphaëlle goes to Marco's apartment and tells him that her son has been taken, blaming him for Joseph's absence and accusing him of using her to hurt Laporte. Marco insists that their affair has nothing to do with Laporte.

Justine is still with Xavier and Elysée, driving around the countryside at night. They caress each other lustfully, first while Xavier drives and then while Justine drives. After Xavier and Elysée fall asleep, Justine appears to be more lucid, with both hands firmly on the wheel. She jerks the steering wheel to the left, towards the woods, and we see the aftermath of the crash. Justine has flown through the windshield and lies on the hood of the car, seemingly dead. Xavier is still in the car, bloodied and unconscious. Elysée has been thrown from the car and is unconscious as well. A man emerges from the woods and picks up Elysée, carrying her away.

Laporte and Joseph return to the family's apartment to collect Joseph's bike and some other odds and ends. Joseph stops by Marco's apartment to find his mother. Raphaëlle is ecstatic when she sees Joseph and embraces him warmly. Laporte tells Raphaëlle that they're leaving again and that he's enrolled Joseph in a new school in Switzerland. Marco arrives on the scene and tells Laporte not to touch Joseph. The two men get into a struggle. Raphaëlle picks up Marco's gun from the table next to her, aims carefully, and shoots Marco in the back, killing him.

Sandra receives a video in the mail and asks Justine's doctor to watch it with her. It is a recording of a sex party involving Laporte, Justine, Jacques, and a prostitute. The tape shows a fully clothed Laporte watching while Jacques undresses and looms over Justine. He then begins molesting his daughter and using the corn cob.

== Cast ==
- Vincent Lindon as Marco Silvestri
- Chiara Mastroianni as Raphaëlle
- Julie Bataille as Sandra
- Michel Subor as Edouard Laporte
- Lola Créton as Justine
- Alex Descas as Dr. Béthanie
- Grégoire Colin as Xavier
- Florence Loiret Caille as Elysée
- Christophe Miossec as Guy
- Hélène Fillières as Banker
- Éric Dupond-Moretti as Lawyer
- Nicole Dogué as Police inspector

== Production ==
The film's title derives from Akira Kurosawa's film The Bad Sleep Well, whose French title Les salauds dorment en paix translates literally to Bastards Sleep in Peace. For the film, Claire Denis also took inspiration from William Faulkner's novel Sanctuary. It is Denis' first feature film that was shot digitally. Filming took place in Paris over the course of 8 weeks.

== Release ==
The film had its world premiere in the Un Certain Regard section at the 2013 Cannes Film Festival on 21 May 2013. It was released in France on 7 August 2013, and in Germany on 26 December 2013.

== Reception ==
On review aggregator website Rotten Tomatoes, the film holds an approval rating of 65% based on 48 reviews, and an average rating of 6.6/10. On Metacritic, the film has a weighted average score of 69 out of 100, based on 17 critics, indicating "generally favorable reviews".

Slant Magazine ranked the film #99 on its list of the best films of the 2010s.
