= Grégoire Colin =

French actor (born 1975)

- Born: 25 July 1975 (age 51); Châtenay-Malabry, France
- Occupations: Actor, filmmaker
- Years active: 1990–present

Grégoire Colin (born 25 July 1975) is a French actor.

== Career ==
Grégoire started acting on the French stage at age 12. He first caught the eye of critics in the 1992 Agnieszka Holland's psychological family drama Olivier, Olivier when he was just 17. He co-starred in Adela (2000), Beau travail (1999) and the Macedonian film Before the Rain (1994), among many others. Colin is set for the lead role in the French thriller film Proie.

In 1998, he participated in the internationally celebrated La Vie Rêvée Des Anges, better known to international audiences as The Dreamlife of Angels, in which he played a ruthless club owner. In 2009, Colin's first short film La Baie Du Renard was screened at the Cannes Film Festival. In 2009, he started his own production company Tsilaosa Films.

Grégoire won the Best Actor Award at the Locarno International Film Festival for his role in the film Nénette et Boni.

== Filmography ==
=== As actor ===
- 1990 : Le Silence d'ailleurs (dir. Guy Mouyal)
- 1991 : L'Année de l'éveil (dir. Gérard Corbiau)
- 1992 : Olivier, Olivier (dir. Agnieszka Holland)
- 1994 : Pas très catholique (dir. Tonie Marshall)
- 1994 : Before the Rain (dir. Milcho Manchevski)
- 1994 : La Reine Margot (dir. Patrice Chéreau)
- 1995 : Fiesta (dir. Pierre Boutron)
- 1996 : Le Fils de Gascogne (dir. Pascal Aubier)
- 1996 : Nénette et Boni (dir. Claire Denis)
- 1998 : La Vie rêvée des anges, (dir. Erick Zonca)
- 1998 : Secret defense (dir. Jacques Rivette)
- 1999 : Beau Travail (dir. Claire Denis)
- 2000 : Sade (dir. Benoît Jacquot)
- 2002 : Sex Is Comedy (dir. Catherine Breillat)
- 2003 : Snowboarder (dir. Olias Barco)
- 2004 : L'intrus (dir. Claire Denis)
- 2005 : The Lost Domain (film) (dir. Raúl Ruiz)
- 2005 : La Ravisseuse (dir. Antoine Santana)
- 2006 : Exes (dir. Martin Cognito)
- 2007 : Le Tueur (dir. Cédric Anger)
- 2007 : In the Arms of My Enemy (dir. Micha Wald)
- 2008 : 35 rhums (dir. Claire Denis)
- 2008 : Nanayomachi (dir. Naomi Kawase)
- 2011 : 15 Lads (Nos Résistances) (dir. Romain Cogitore)
- 2013: Les salauds (dir. Claire Denis)
- 2015: Full Contact
- 2020: Simple Passion
- 2021: You Resemble Me (dir. Dina Amer)
- 2022: Both Sides of the Blade (dir. Claire Denis)
- 2022: Paris Memories (Revoir Paris)
- 2022: Women at War
- 2023: The Vourdalak
- 2024: Across the Sea (La Mer au loin)
- 2024: The Partisan
- 2024: Meeting with Pol Pot (dir. Rithy Panh)
- 2024: Serpent's Path (dir. Kiyoshi Kurosawa)
- 2025: MobLand
- 2025: Silent Rebellion
- 2026: Cat's Eyes

=== As director ===
- 2010 : La Baie du renard (short film)
