= Chocolat (1988 film) =

- Theatrical release poster
- Directed by: Claire Denis
- Written by: Claire Denis; Jean-Pol Fargeau
- Produced by: Alain Belmondo; Gérard Crosnier
- Starring: Isaach de Bankolé; Giulia Boschi; François Cluzet; Jean-Claude Adelin; Emmanuelle Chaulet; Kenneth Cranham; Jacques Denis; Cécile Ducasse; Didier Flamand; Mireille Perrier
- Cinematography: Robert Alazraki
- Edited by: Monica Coleman; Claudine Merlin; Sylvie Quester
- Music by: Abdullah Ibrahim
- Distributed by: MK2
- Release date: 1988
- Running time: 105 minutes
- Countries: France; Cameroon
- Languages: French; English
- Box office: $2,344,286 (international)

Chocolat is a 1988 French period drama film, written and directed by Claire Denis in her directorial debut. It follows a young girl who lives with her family in French Cameroon. Marc and Aimée Dalens (François Cluzet and Giulia Boschi) play the parents of protagonist France (Cécile Ducasse), who befriends Protée (Isaach de Bankolé), a Cameroonian who is the family's household servant.

Chocolat was entered into the 1988 Cannes Film Festival. The film was met with positive reviews.

== Plot ==
An adult woman named France walks down a road toward Douala in Cameroon. She is picked up by William J. Park, an African American who has moved to Africa and is driving to Limbe with his son. As they ride, France's mind drifts and we see her as a young girl in Mindif in the northern part of French Cameroon in 1957, where her father was a colonial administrator for the French Empire.

The story is told through the eyes of young France, showing her friendship with the "houseboy," Protée, as well as the sexual tension between Protée and her ‘‘easy-going’’ mother, Aimée. The conflict of the film comes from the discomfort created as France and her mother attempt to move past the established boundaries between themselves and the native Africans. This is brought to a head through Luc Segalen, a Western drifter who stays with the Dalens family after a small aircraft crashes nearby. He acknowledges Aimée's attraction to Protée in the presence of other black servants. This later results in a fight between Luc and Protée, which Protée wins. During the fight, Aimée sits nearby, unseen by the two. She attempts to seduce Protée after Luc has left but he rejects her advance. Aimée consequently asks her husband to remove him from the house. Protée is moved from his in-house job to working outdoors in the garage as a mechanic.

Towards the end of the film, France's father reveals a central theme of the film as he explains to her what the horizon is. He tells her that it is a line that is there but not there, a symbol for the boundaries that exist in the country between rich and poor, master and servant, white and black, coloniser and colonised, male and female; a line that is always visible but impossible to approach or pass.

== Cast ==
- Isaach de Bankolé as Protée
- Giulia Boschi as Aimée Dalens
- François Cluzet as Marc Dalens
- Cécile Ducasse as France Dalens, as a girl
- Mireille Perrier as France Dalens, as a woman
- Jean-Claude Adelin as Luc
- Laurent Arnal as Machinard
- Jean Bediebe as Prosper
- Didier Flamand as Captain Védrine
- Jean-Quentin Châtelain as Courbassol
- Emmanuelle Chaulet as Mireille Machinard
- Kenneth Cranham as Jonathan Boothby
- Jacques Denis as Joseph Delpich
- Clementine Essono as Marie-Jeanne
- Essindi Mindja as Blaise

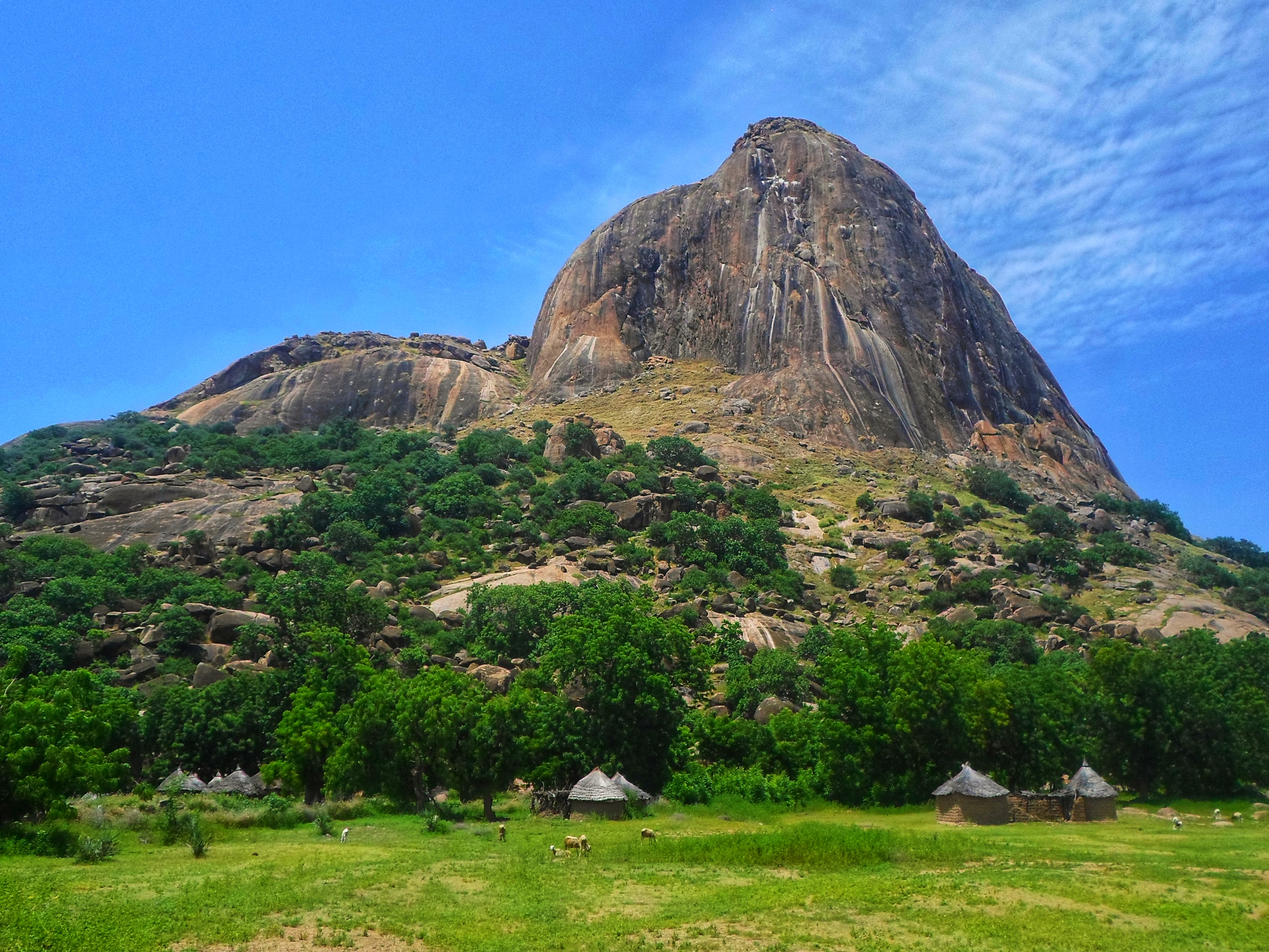
The Mindif peaks, depicted in the film

== Soundtrack ==
The soundtrack, performed and recorded by Abdullah Ibrahim, was released in 1988 as Mindif.

== Reception ==
On the review aggregator website Rotten Tomatoes, 71% of 14 critics' reviews are positive, with an average rating of 7.1/10. Metacritic, which uses a weighted average, assigned the film a score of 81 out of 100, based on 18 critics, indicating "universal acclaim".

Roger Ebert gave the film a full four stars, writing that it was a "deliberately beautiful film" that was among the best of the year. J. Hoberman of The New York Times praised Chocolat and called it "austere and vivid"
