= Beau Travail =

1999 French arthouse psychological drama film by Claire Denis

- Theatrical release poster
- Directed by: Claire Denis
- Screenplay by: Jean-Pol Fargeau; Claire Denis
- Based on: Billy Budd by Herman Melville
- Produced by: Patrick Grandperret
- Starring: Denis Lavant; Michel Subor; Grégoire Colin
- Cinematography: Agnès Godard
- Edited by: Nelly Quettier
- Music by: Eran Tzur
- Distributed by: Pyramide Distribution
- Release dates: 4 September 1999 (Venice); 3 May 2000 (France)
- Running time: 90 minutes
- Country: France
- Languages: French; Italian; Russian
- Box office: $570,000

Beau Travail (pronounced [bo tʁa.vaj], French for "good job" or "nice work") is a 1999 French arthouse psychological drama film directed by Claire Denis, who co-wrote the screenplay alongside Jean-Pol Fargeau as an adaptation of the novella Billy Budd by Herman Melville. Starring Denis Lavant, Michel Subor and Grégoire Colin, it follows the story of a section of French Foreign Legion soldiers training in the desert of Djibouti.

The film received widespread critical acclaim with special attention towards its direction, acting, cinematography, soundtrack and handling of its themes. It is considered one of the best French films and best movies directed by a female director. It is currently ranked the 7th best movie of all time by Sight and Sound.

== Plot ==
Adjudant-Chef Galoup of the French Foreign Legion reflects on his life from his home in Marseille. He recalls his time in Djibouti, where he led a section of men under the command of Commandant Bruno Forestier. Galoup admired and envied many of Forestier's qualities, including his clear affection from the men, and retains a wristband with Forestier's name. Galoup has a Djiboutian girlfriend, and they often go out dancing.

A new recruit named Gilles Sentain joins Galoup's section. Galoup harbors an immediate and seemingly irrational hostility towards Sentain, and vows to destroy him. When Sentain hands a canteen of water to another soldier who is being punished by being forced to dig a large hole in the heat of the day, Galoup chastises Sentain and knocks the canteen from his hand. Sentain punches Galoup, who retaliates by taking Sentain into the desert and ordering him to walk back to the base alone. Galoup had tampered with Sentain's compass, causing him to become lost and collapse from dehydration in the arid salt flats.

Sentain is found and rescued by locals, but never returns to the base and is presumed to have deserted. His sabotaged compass is later found by the legionnaires. On the assumption that Galoup had attempted to kill Sentain, Galoup is sent back to France by Forestier for a court-martial, ending his career in the Foreign Legion. He makes his bed in the immaculate military manner, then lies on top clutching a pistol, and reads aloud the phrase tattooed on his chest: "Sers la bonne cause et meurs" ("Serve the good cause and die"). In the final scene, Galoup energetically dances to "The Rhythm of the Night" in the Djiboutian nightclub he once patronized.

== Cast ==
- Denis Lavant as Adjudant-Chef Galoup
- Michel Subor as Commandant Bruno Forestier
- Grégoire Colin as Légionnaire Gilles Sentain
- Richard Courcet as Légionnaire
- Nicolas Duvauchelle as Légionnaire

== Production ==
The film was shot in Djibouti. The exercise scenes of the soldiers in the desert were designed by choreographer Bernardo Montet, whose job, he recalled, was to "release the poetic powers" of their bodies. Claire Denis said, "One of the cast had actually been in the Legion, so we took all their real exercises and did them together every day, to concentrate the actors as a group. We never said we were going to choreograph the film. But afterwards, when we started shooting, using Britten's music, those exercises became like a dance." Parts of the film's soundtrack are taken from Benjamin Britten's 1951 opera based on Melville's novella.

The final dance scene in which Galoup dances in the club was not originally shot to end the film. "In the script, it was because he was leaving for good," Denis recalled. "He wanted to go to the bar for the last time. He starts dancing like the last dance of his life." This sequence was only placed at the end of the film at the editing stage.

== Release ==
The film was screened on 4 September 1999 in the Cinema del Presente section at the 56th Venice International Film Festival. It was theatrically released in France on 3 May 2000 by Pyramide Distribution.

== Reception ==
The film was highly acclaimed in the United States, topping the Village Voice's Film Critics' Poll in 2000, with Claire Denis also placing at #2 for best director. Jonathan Rosenbaum of the Chicago Reader rated it a "masterpiece", giving it the paper's highest rating of four stars. Charles Taylor of Salon.com wrote that "Beau Travail is the most extreme example of [Denis'] talent, baffling and exhilarating. I don't know when I've seen a movie that is in so many ways foreign to what draws me to movies and still felt under a spell." J. Hoberman of The Village Voice wrote that the film is "so tactile in its cinematography, inventive in its camera placement, and sensuous in its editing that the purposefully oblique and languid narrative is all but eclipsed."

The film's reputation has only grown with time. More recently, film scholar Erika Balsom has written that the ending sequence "is perhaps the best ending of any film, ever," explaining that "Galoup finds a rhythm of life that follows none of the patterns of colonial, patriarchal power the film so skilfully traces and complicates... he inhabits a utopia of movement without rules". Critic Simran Hans wrote for Sight and Sound that "Denis's great gift is her ability to evoke emotion with gesture and juxtaposition. In the Djibouti desert, water shimmers and ripples, naked shoulders perspire and black mosquito nets recall sheer lingerie." In The New Yorker, Alex Ross has called it a "modern classic," adding that "it feels, in a way, older than it is, a gorgeous relic of a period when gay desire could achieve only incomplete expression or had to be concealed altogether. Denis's movie seems like the completion of an arc—the rise and decline of the tragedy of the closet as an artistic genre."

The review aggregator website, Metacritic, gave the film a score of 91 out of 100 based on 20 reviews, indicating "universal acclaim". On Rotten Tomatoes, another aggregator, it has an 88% approval rating based on 48 reviews, with an average rating of 7.9/10. The site's consensus reads: "Beau Travail finds director Claire Denis drawing on classic literature to construct a modern tragedy fueled by timeless desires".

In 2017, Rolling Stone named the film as the 12th best film in their list The 100 Greatest Movies of the Nineties. In the 2022 Sight and Sound critic's poll, Beau Travail was ranked the 7th best movie of all time. Variety magazine ranked Beau Travail 69th for its list The 100 Greatest Movies of All Time. In 2025, it was among of the films voted for the "Readers' Choice" edition of The New York Times' list of "The 100 Best Movies of the 21st Century," finishing at number 284.
