= Jean-Pol Fargeau =

French screenwriter

Jean-Pol Fargeau is a French screenwriter and frequent collaborator of writer-director Claire Denis. They have made ten films together, most notably Chocolat (1988), Beau Travail (1999), and 35 Shots of Rum (2008).

== Career ==
Jean-Pol Fargeau is a French screenwriter who has often collaborated with director Claire Denis. With Denis, he co-wrote Chocolat (1988), Beau Travail (1999), and 35 Shots of Rum (2008), Bastards (2013) and Denis' first English-language film, High Life (2018). As of 2019, the two had made ten films together. In a 2013 interview, Fargeau said of their collaboration, “It’s very strange, this partnership and relationship — we are like brother and sister,” albeit unusually free of strife for siblings. They work together based in Paris.

Generally their work was highly praised, drawing award nominations and strong reviews, with some exceptions. Of Trouble Every Day (2002), Stephen Holden wrote in The New York Times, "The story, by [Claire] Denis and Jean-Pol Fargeau, is so sketchy it amounts to little more than preliminary notes for a science-fiction horror film, and the movie's fragmentary narrative style makes piecing the story together frustratingly difficult.” Still Holden called the result a “daring, intermittently beautiful failure of a movie.”

Fargeau's memories of his own family secrets set the tone for Bastards, although the particulars of the plot are not autobiographical.

Fargeau has also collaborated with fashion designer Agnès B. to write the 2014 film My Name is Hmmm.

== Awards ==
=== Nominations ===
Chlotrudis Awards	2001	Nominee Chlotrudis Award for Best Adapted Screenplay	Beau travail (1999) Shared with Claire Denis
Hamburg Film Festival	2008	Nominee Screenplay Award	35 shots of rum (2008) Shared with: Claire Denis
International Cinephile Society Awards	2010	Nominee ICS Award for Best Original Screenplay	35 shots of rum (2008) Shared with: Claire Denis
