= Austrian Cultural Forum =

Agency of the [Austrian] Federal Ministry for European and International Affairs

- Formation: 2001 (renamed from cultural institutes/departments)
- Type: Cultural and scientific agency
- Headquarters: Vienna, Austria
- Location: 30 locations worldwide
- Parent organization: Federal Ministry for European and International Affairs

An Austrian Cultural Forum is an agency of the Federal Ministry for European and International Affairs, responsible for cultural and scientific dialogue with artists and scientists of each host country. A cultural forum focuses on the specific needs of local users and partners, and works independently on different contents. The international network currently consists of 30 cultural forums.

Cultural forums were originally established as either a "cultural institute" or a "cultural department of an Austrian embassy". In March 2001, both were renamed as "cultural forum".

City	Established	Name in local language
Belgrade	2001	austrijski kulturni forum
Berlin	1991	österreichisches kulturforum
Bern	2001	österreichisches kulturforum
Brussels	2001	forum culturel autrichien^{bru}, oostenrijks cultuurforum^{bru}, österreichisches kulturforum^{bru}
Budapest	1976	osztrák kulturális fórum
Bucharest	1999	forumul cultural austriac
Istanbul	1974	avusturya kültür ofisi
Cairo	1959	Austrian cultural forum
Krakau	1990	austriackie forum kultury
Kyiv	1994	Австрійський культурний форум
Ljubljana	1990	avstrijski kulturni forum
London	1956	Austrian cultural forum
Madrid	1992	foro cultural de Austria
Milan	1993	forum austriaco di cultura
Mexico City	2002	foro cultural de Austria
Moscow	2001	Австрийский культурный форум
New Delhi	2007	Austrian cultural forum
New York	1956	Austrian cultural forum
Ottawa	2001	Austrian cultural forum
Paris	1954	forum culturel autrichien
Peking	2004	österreichisches kulturforum
Prag	1993	rakouské kulturní fórum
Bratislava	1990	rakúske kultúrne forúm
Rome	1935	forum austriaco di cultura
Sarajevo	2018	Austrijski kulturni forum Sarajevo (Part of the Austrian Embassy Sarajevo.)
Teheran	1958	Das einzige Kulturforum, an dem auch Deutsch unterrichtet wird.
Tel Aviv	2001	
Tokyo	2001	オーストリア文化フォーラム
Warsaw	1965	austriackie forum kultury
Washington	2001	Austrian cultural forum
Zagreb	1974	austrijski kulturni forum

== ACFNY Translation Prize ==
The Austrian Cultural Forum New York Translation Prize is an annual literary prize that supports translations of contemporary Austrian fiction, poetry, and drama which have not previously appeared in English, with a grant of US$5,000. The first award was in 2009. In 2012 and 2013 the award was "suspended until further notice" due to budgetary constraints. It was revived in 2014 and is now awarded in a two-year cycle.

- 2009 Jean M. Snook's translation of Gert Jonke's The Distant Sound (Der ferne Klang)
- 2010 David Dollenmayer's translation of Michael Köhlmeier's Idyll With Drowning Dog (Idylle mit ertrinkendem Hund)
- 2011 Damion Searls' translation of Elfriede Jelinek's Her Not All Her (Er nicht als er)
- 2015 Tess Lewis's translation of Maja Haderlap's Angel of Oblivion (Engel des Vergessens)
- 2017 Adrian Nathan West's translation of Josef Winkler's The Abduction (Die Verschleppung: Njetotschka Iljaschenko erzählt ihre russische Kindheit)

== See also ==
- Goethe-Institute – the German pendant
