= Angel of Oblivion =

2011 autobiographical novel by Maja Haderlap

- First edition (German)
- Author: Maja Haderlap
- Original title: Engel des Vergessens
- Translators: Tess Lewis
- Genre: Historical fiction / Memoir
- Publisher: Wallstein
- Publication date: 2011
- Publication place: Germany
- English publication date: 2016
- Award: Ingeborg Bachmann Prize; Helen and Kurt Wolff Translator's Prize; PEN Translation Prize; Max Frisch Prize
- ISBN: 978-3-8353-0953-1 (German edition)

Angel of Oblivion (German: Engel des Vergessens, Slovene: Angel pozabe) is a 2011 autobiographical novel written by bilingual Slovenian-German Austrian writer Maja Haderlap. The story revolves around the life of a Carinthian Slovene peasant family that had been badly struck by the National Socialist regime in World War II. The novel highlights Austria's only militarily organised resistance against National Socialism, the Carinthian minority of Carinthian Slovenes as one of the non-Jewish Holocaust's victims.

== Awards and honors ==
In 2016, the German Book Office in New York City chose Angel of Oblivion as its August Pick of the Month.

Awards for Angel of Oblivion
Year	Award	Result	Ref.
2011	Ingeborg Bachmann Prize (Note: Angel of Oblivion received 25,000 euro at the 35th Festival of German Literature in Klagenfurt.)	Winner	
2015	Austrian Cultural Forum New York Translation Prize	Winner	
2017	BTBA Best Translated Book Award for Fiction	Longlist	
2017	Helen and Kurt Wolff Translator's Prize		
2017	PEN Translation Prize for Tess Lewis	Winner	
2018	Max Frisch Prize	Winner	
