= PEN Translation Prize =

Annual translation prize

The PEN Translation Prize (formerly known as the PEN/Book-of-the-Month Club Translation Prize through 2008) is an annual award given by PEN America (formerly PEN American Center) to outstanding translations into the English language. It has been presented annually by PEN America and the Book of the Month Club since 1963. It was the first award in the United States expressly for literary translators. A 1999 New York Times article called it "the Academy Award of Translation", stating that the award is thus usually not given to younger translators.

The distinction comes with a cash prize of US$3,000. Any book-length English translation published in the United States during the year in question is eligible, irrespective of the residence or nationality of either the translator or the original author.

The award is separate from the similar PEN Award for Poetry in Translation.

The PEN Translation Prize was called one of "the most prominent translation awards." The award is one of many PEN awards sponsored by International PEN affiliates in over 145 PEN centres around the world. The PEN American Center awards have been characterized as being among the "major" American literary prizes.

== Winners ==
PEN Translation Prize winners
Year	Translator	Author	Title	Original title	Language	Ref.
1963	Archibald Colquhoun	Federico De Roberto	The Viceroys	I Viceré	Italian	
1964	Ralph Manheim	Günter Grass	The Tin Drum	Die Blechtrommel	German	
1965	Joseph Barnes	Konstantin Paustovsky	The Story of a Life	Повесть о жизни	Russian	
1966	Geoffrey Skelton and Adrian Mitchell	Peter Weiss	Marat/Sade		German	
1967	Harriet de Onis	João Guimarães Rosa	Sagarana: The Duel	Sagarana, o Duelo	Portuguese	
1968	Vladimir Markov and Merrill Sparks (eds.)		Modern Russian Poetry	—N/a	Russian	
1969	W. S. Merwin		Selected Translations 1948-1968	—N/a	Various	
1970	Sidney Alexander	Francesco Guicciardini	The History of Italy	Storia d'Italia	Italian	
1971	Max Hayward	Nadezhda Mandelstam	Hope Against Hope	Воспоминания	Russian	
1972	Richard Winston and Clara Winston		Letters of Thomas Mann	—N/a	German	
1973	J. P. McCullough		The Poems of Sextus Propertius	—N/a	Latin	
1974	Hardie St. Martin and Leonard Mades	José Donoso	The Obscene Bird of Night	El obsceno pájaro de la noche	Spanish	
1975	Helen R. Lane	Juan Goytisolo	Count Julian	Reivindicación del conde don Julián	Spanish	
1976	Richard Howard	E. M. Cioran	A Short History of Decay	Précis de décomposition	French	
1977	Gregory Rabassa	Gabriel García Márquez	The Autumn of the Patriarch	El otoño del patriarca	Spanish	
1979	Adrienne Foulke	Leonardo Sciascia	One Way or Another	Todo modo	Italian	
1979	Charles Wright	Eugenio Montale	The Storm and Other Poems	La bufera e altro	Italian	
1980	Charles Simic	Vasko Popa	Homage to the Lame Wolf	—N/a	Serbian	
1981	John E. Woods	Arno Schmidt	Evening Edged in Gold	Abend mit Goldrand	German	
1982	Hiroaki Sato and Burton Watson		From the Country of Eight Islands: An Anthology of Japanese Poetry	—N/a	Japanese	
1983	Richard Wilbur	Molière	Four Comedies: The Misanthrope, Tartuffe, The Learned Ladies, The School for Wives	Le Misanthrope, Tartuffe, Les Femmes savantes, L'école des femmes	French	
1984	William Weaver	Umberto Eco	The Name of the Rose	Il nome della rosa	Italian	
1985 (prose)	Helen R. Lane	Mario Vargas Llosa	The War of the End of the World	La guerra del fin del mundo	Spanish	
1985 (verse)	Seamus Heaney		Sweeney Astray	Buile Shuibhne	Irish	
1986 (prose)	Barbara Bray	Marguerite Duras	The Lover	L'Amant	French	
1986 (verse)	Dennis Tedlock		Popol Vuh: The Mayan Book of the Dawn of Life	Popol voh	Quiché	
1987	John E. Woods	Patrick Süskind	Perfume: The Story of a Murderer	Das Parfum: Die Geschichte eines Mörders	German	
1988	Madeline Levine and Francine Prose	Ida Fink	A Scrap of Time	Skrawek czasu	Polish	
1989	Matthew Ward	Albert Camus	The Stranger	L'Étranger	French	
1990	William Weaver	Umberto Eco	Foucault's Pendulum	Il pendolo di Foucault	Italian	
1991	Richard Pevear and Larissa Volokhonsky	Fyodor Dostoevsky	The Brothers Karamazov	Братья Карамазовы	Russian	
1992	David Rosenberg		A Poet's Bible		Hebrew	
1993	Thomas Hoisington	Ignacy Krasicki	The Adventures of Mr. Nicholas Wisdom	Mikołaja Doświadczyńskiego przypadki	Polish	
1994	Bill Zavatsky and Zack Rogow	André Breton	Earthlight	Clair de terre	French	
1995	Burton Watson		Selected Poems of Su Tung-p'o	—N/a	Chinese	
1996	Stanisław Barańczak and Clare Cavanagh	Wisława Szymborska	View With a Grain of Sand	Widok z ziarnkiem piasku	Polish	
1997	Arnold Pomerans		The Letters of Vincent van Gogh	—N/a	Dutch	
1998	Peter Constantine	Thomas Mann	Six Early Stories	—N/a	German	
1999	Michael Hofmann	Joseph Roth	The Tale of the 1002nd Night	Die Geschichte von der 1002. Nacht	German	
2000	Richard Sieburth	Gérard de Nerval	Selected Writings	—N/a	French	
2001	Tiina Nunnally	Sigrid Undset	The Cross	Korset	Norwegian	
2002	Richard Pevear and Larissa Volokhonsky	Leo Tolstoy	Anna Karenina	Анна Каренина	Russian	
2003	R. W. Flint	Cesare Pavese	The Moon and the Bonfires	La Luna e i falò	Italian	
2004	Margaret Sayers Peden	Antonio Muñoz Molina	Sepharad	Sefarad	Spanish	
2005	Tim Wilkinson	Imre Kertész	Fatelessness	Sorstalanság	Hungarian	
2006	Philip Gabriel	Haruki Murakami	Kafka on the Shore	海辺のカフカ	Japanese	
2007	Sandra Smith	Irène Némirovsky	Suite française		French	
2008	Margaret Jull Costa	Eça de Queirós	The Maias	Os Maias: Episódios da Vida Romântica	Portuguese	
2009	Natasha Wimmer	Roberto Bolaño	2666		Spanish	
2010	Michael Henry Heim	Hugo Claus	Wonder	De verwondering	Dutch	
2011	Ibrahim Muhawi	Mahmoud Darwish	Journal of an Ordinary Grief	يوميات الحزن العادي	Arabic	
2012	Bill Johnston	Wiesław Myśliwski	Stone Upon Stone	Kamień na kamieniu	Polish	
2013	Donald O. White	Albert Vigoleis Thelen	The Island of Second Sight	Die Insel des zweiten Gesichts	German	
2014	Joanne Turnbull and Nikolai Formozov	Sigizmund Krzhizhanovsky	Autobiography of a Corpse	Автобиография трупа	Russian	
2015	Denise Newman	Naja Marie Aidt	Baboon	Bavian	Danish	
2016	Katrina Dodson	Clarice Lispector	The Complete Stories	Todas as Crónicas	Portuguese	
2017	Tess Lewis	Maja Haderlap	Angel of Oblivion	Engel des Vergessens	German	
2018	Len Rix	Magda Szabó	Katalin Street	Katalin utca	Hungarian	
2019	Martin Aitken	Hanne Ørstavik	Love	Kjærlighet	Norwegian	
2020	Allison Markin Powell	Hiromi Kawakami	The Ten Loves of Nishino	ニシノユキヒコの恋と冒険	Japanese	
2021	Emma Ramadan	Abdellah Taïa	A Country for Dying	Un pays pour mourir	French	
2022	Mariana Oliver	Julia Sanches	Migratory Birds	Aves migratorias	Spanish	
2023	Tiffany Tsao	Budi Darma	People from Bloomington	Orang-orang Bloomington	Indonesian	
2025	Brian Robert Moore	Michele Mari	Verdigris	Verderame	Italian	
2026	Minna Zallman Proctor	Cesare Pavese	The Leucothea Dialogues	Dialoghi con Leucò	Italian	

== See also ==
- PEN/Heim Translation Fund Grants
