= Incest (disambiguation) =

Incest refers to sexual relations between relatives.

Incest may also refer to:

- Incest (film), a 1929 German film directed by James Bauer
- Incest (law), a crime in various jurisdictions
- Incest (novel), a 1999 novel by Christine Angot
- Incest: From a Journal of Love, a 1992 autobiography by Anaïs Nin

== See also ==
- Inbreeding
- Incest pornography
