= A Scrap of Time and Other Stories =

Short story collection by Ida Fink

- 1985 Polish edition (publ. MYJL)
- Original title: Skrawek czasu
- Translator: Madeline Levine and Francine Prose
- Published: Pantheon Books, 1987
- Pages: 165
- Awards: Anne Frank Prize, PEN/Book-of-the-Month Club Translation Prize
- ISBN: 9780394558066
- OCLC: 609356447
- LC Class: PG7165 .I44 S513 1987

A Scrap of Time and Other Stories, written by Ida Fink, is a collection of fictional short stories relating various characters to the Jewish experience of the Holocaust. Originally written in Polish, it was translated by Madeline Levine and Francine Prose. The novel won the first Anne Frank Prize, as well as the PEN/Book-of-the-Month Club Translation Prize. Published in 1987, this collection of stories illustrates the continuing effect of the Holocaust on the Jewish psyche.

== List of stories ==
Short stories in the collection:

- A Scrap of Time
- The Garden That Floated Away
- Behind the Hedge
- '*****'
- A Dog
- Jean-Christophe
- The Key Game
- A Spring Morning
- A Conversation
- The Black Beast
- Aryan Papers
- Inspector von Galoshinsky
- The Pig
- Titina
- Night of Surrender
- The Tenth Man
- Crazy
- Jump!
- The Other Shore
- Splinter
- The Shelter
- Traces
- The Table

== Reception ==
In her review of the book for The New York Times, Johanna Kaplan wrote that "nearly all the stories in this idiomatically translated book arise from a premise or a situation that is compelling and, briefly, chillingly alive with fictional possibility". She says that the book "raises poignant, truculent ghosts, and their bewildered echoing voices - arguing, dreaming, accusing, lamenting, remembering and refusing to remember - allow us powerful imaginative passage to an unimaginably infernal world".

American book review magazine Kirkus Reviews said "each brief story is crystallized around moments when quietly ordinary people, living secure and ordered existences, enter nightmare" and praised Fink for telling "poignant, wrenching tales, told with skill and unwavering focus".

Thomas Klein wrote in Polin: Studies in Polish Jewry Volume 12, that the collection of stories "offer a haunting, uncompromising view of lives that have been disrupted and terminated". He also notes that the short stories "include no crematoria, no selections, and no merciless views of life in the camps, but their absence does not mitigate the sadness, futility, and the omnipresent 'why'." He concludes that Fink's writing offers "spare, quiet stories that disturb in a far more upsetting way", and that "they threaten our very beliefs in an essential human dignity and innocence".

Chris Power, literary critic for The Guardian, praised the book as well, writing that the short stories were "tightly focused stories ... that "should be remembered as vital historical witness and as great literature". He singles out the short The Shelter as "a classically constructed horror story that is one of the best examples of the genre" [Holocaust], that he has ever read. He also opines that Fink's book "has a vital part to play in our understanding of the Holocaust".

== Film adaption ==
The short stories "A Conversation" and "A Spring Morning" were adapted into a 2008 film titled Spring 1941.
