= Torkwase Dyson =

American artist

- Born: Chicago, Illinois
- Education: Yale University, Virginia Commonwealth University, Tougaloo College
- Known for: Painting, printmaking, conceptual art
- Awards: Joan Mitchell Foundation Painters & Sculptors award, Nancy Graves Grant for Visual Artists

Torkwase Dyson (born 1973, Chicago, Illinois) is an interdisciplinary artist based in Beacon, New York, United States. Dyson describes the themes of her work as "architecture, infrastructure, environmental justice, and abstract drawing." Her work is informed by her own theory of Black Compositional Thought. This working term considers how spatial networks—paths, throughways, water, architecture, and geographies—are composed by Black bodies as a means of exploring potential networks for Black liberation. She is represented by Pace Gallery and Richard Gray Gallery.

== Background and education ==
Dyson was born in Chicago, Illinois. She attended Tougaloo College where she earned degrees in sociology and social work. In 1999 she received a BFA from Virginia Commonwealth University. She received her MFA in painting/printmaking from Yale School of Art in 2003.

== Projects ==
=== Studio South Zero x In Conditions of Fresh Water ===
Studio South Zero (SSZ) was Dyson's mobile solar-powered art studio. In 2016, Dyson and environmental social scientist Danielle Purifoy, traversed post-Bellum black communities in Alamance County, NC and Lowndes County, AL in Studio South Zero, collaborating with community members to create an assemblage of oral histories, artifacts, images, and materials to understand the traditions and nuances of black environmental, cultural, and economic placemaking. In 2017, this assemblage was exhibited in In Conditions of Fresh Water: An Artistic Exploration of Environmental Racism at Duke University Center for Documentary Studies.

=== The Wynter-Wells Drawing School for Environmental Justice ===
From February 24, 2018, to March 11, 2018, Dyson led a two-week series of classes, discussions, and experiments held at the Drawing Center. Named the Wynter-Wells Drawing School for Environmental Justice after Jamaican writer Sylvia Wynter and American civil rights leader Ida B. Wells, "The School presented an experimental curriculum employing techniques culled from the visual arts as well as design theories of geography, infrastructure, engineering, and architecture to initiate dialogue about geography and spatiality in an era of global crisis due to human-induced climate change."

From May 3, 2018, to July 28, 2018, The Graham Foundation for Advanced Studies in the Arts presented an exhibition of Dyson's work building off of her two-week residency at the Drawing Center, Winter Term. The exhibition consisted of new site-specific drawings and a series of programming under the title The Wynter-Wells Drawing School for Environmental Liberation, as part of Dyson's pedagogical approach to art-making, consisting of a series of workshops, lectures, and an open studio where Dyson would actively produce and alter the work on view in front of the public.

1919: Black Water

“1919: Black Water” by Torkwase Dyson was an art exhibition that combined paintings, drawings and sculptures that, through different layers of washes, colors, textures and geometric markings, as well as materials and techniques, express the complexity of the relationship between bodily movement and architecture. It took place between September 27 and December 14, 2019, in the Arthur Ross Architecture Gallery.

The 100 year anniversary of the Red Summer Riots that took place in Chicago, Illianois, in 1919 inspired Torkwase Dyson to narrate a very racially violent period and share the history of black resistance in the United States through her artistic ideology. She was inspired by stories of how black men and women such as Henry “Box” Brown and Harriet Jacobs escaped slavery, or how five young boys built a raft as a safe-space between two racially segregated beaches.

The 1919 Black Water exhibit gives an impression of how Dyson utilizes her foundational geometric shapes to express her most prominent current concerns: the political, social and natural environment. This particular exhibit, as well as narrating the riots of that summer, focuses on the story of five young boys that built a raft in Chicago, but got stoned by a white girl and ended up arrested, and one of them killed, because it embodies her understanding of what “black compositional though” is.

Dyson’s art studies how black bodies compose architecture in all of its forms, how these places, properties and objects interact with brown and black people as networks of both oppression and liberation. She focuses on the raft as a symbol of an in-between, the interstitial political and environmental conditions lived, both by black people in the past and in the present, and how this space is perceived and negotiated. It also embodies the concern about climate change and how disproportionately it affects black communities, even 100 years in the past.

== Exhibitions ==
Dyson's work has been exhibited in galleries and museums worldwide. Her sculptures, paintings, drawings, and performances have been included in numerous solo exhibitions and installations at institutions, including Pace Gallery, Serpentine Galleries, Hall Art Foundation, New Orleans Museum of Art, Arthur Ross Architecture Gallery at Columbia University, The Irwin S. Chanin School of Architecture at The Cooper Union, Colby Museum of Art at Colby College, Suzanne Lemberg Usdan Gallery at Bennington College, Rhona Hoffman Gallery, Graham Foundation, Davidson Contemporary, The Drawing Center, Landmark Gallery at Texas Tech University, Second Street Gallery, Industry City Gallery/Eyebeam, Hemphill Fine Arts, Schiltkamp Gallery at Clark University, Meat Market Gallery, Ty Stokes Gallery, and Corcoran School of the Arts and Design.

Her work has been included in group exhibitions at Passerelle Centre d'art contemporain, Parrish Art Museum, The Mississippi Museum of Art, Contemporary Art Museum St. Louis, Gladstone Gallery, Gracie Mansion Conservancy, Alexander Gray Associates, California African American Museum, Sharjah at United Arab Emirates, The Studio Museum in Harlem, Socrates Sculpture Park, Whitney Museum Museum of Art, Duke University Center for Documentary Studies, the Harvey B. Gantt Center and more.

Dyson has participated in Performa 19 creating a two-act performance and sculptural installation titled I Can Drink the Distance: Plantationocene in 2 Acts (2019). Curated by Mark Beasley, the commissioned work was presented from November 19 to November 22, 2019.

In 2023, Torwase Dyson's work is being presented at the São Paulo Art Biennial, in the city of São Paulo, Brazil. Their piece "Liquid a Place" is also being exhibited in Tate Liverpool as part of the 2023 Liverpool Biennial "uMoya".

== Collections ==
Dyson's work is included in the collections of the Art Institute of Chicago, Hall Art Foundation, The Long Museum, Mead Art Museum, Mildred Lane Kemper Art Museum, Smith College Museum of Art, Smithsonian National Museum of African American History & Culture and The Studio Museum in Harlem.

== Awards ==
In 2016, Dyson was elected to the board of the Architectural League of New York as Vice President of Visual Arts. In 2019, Dyson was awarded the Studio Museum's Joyce Alexander Wein Artist Prize and the Anonymous Was a Woman award for painting. In addition to many other grants, fellowships and residencies, she has been the recipient of The Joan Mitchell Painters and Sculptors Grant, Nancy Graves Grant for Visual Artists, Brooklyn Arts Council grant, Yale University Paul Harper Residency at Vermont Studio Center, Spelman College Art Fellowship, and Yaddo.

== Select lectures and panels ==
In 2017, Dyson was on the faculty of the Skowhegan School of Painting and Sculpture and has been a visiting critic at Yale School of Art. In addition to being a guest lecturer, she has participated in a number of panel discussions, artists talks, readings and performance lectures in collaboration with Black environmentalists, artists, poets, architects, dancers, and musicians.

=== 2022 ===
- Pace Gallery, New York, NY, Torkwase Dyson in Conversation with Mario Gooden: On the History of Infrastructure in Dyson's Practice, December 7

=== 2021 ===
- Pace Gallery, London, UK, Torkwase Dyson: Liquid A Place, October 7, 9, 11

=== 2018 ===
- Graham Foundation, Chicago, IL, Christina Sharpe and Torkwase Dyson in Conversation, June 14
- Mississippi Museum of Art, Jackson, MS, Race, Space, and Abstraction in the American South, February 17
- Drawing Center, New York, NY, Wynter-Wells Drawing School for Environmental Justice Panel Discussion, March 1

=== 2017 ===
- Duke University, Durham, NC, In Conditions of Fresh Water, March 20
- Metropolitan Museum of Art, New York, NY, Artists on Artworks series, Three Conditions of Space, March 24
- The New School, New York, NY, Visiting Artist Lecture Series, April 26
- Skowhegan School of Painting and Sculpture, Skowhegan, ME, Barbara Lee Lecture Series, June 23
- ArtCenter / South Florida, Miami FL, On Documentary Abstraction, August 30
- Pennsylvania Academy of the Fine Arts, Philadelphia, PA, Hyper Shape, December 6
- Design Miami, Miami, FL, Concept, Abstraction, Blackness, December 8

=== 2016 ===
- Studio Museum in Harlem, New York, NY, The Artist's Voice, February 4
- Eyebeam, New York, NY, Black Spatial Matters, April 9
- University of Arizona, Tucson, AZ, Visual Artists and Scholars Committee, Illegal Abstraction A Single Author, October 6
- Hunter College, New York, NY, On Painting, October 19
- Drawing Center, New York, NY, Open Session 9: Cartography of Ghosts, December 15

=== 2015 ===
- University of Pennsylvania, Philadelphia, PA, Values of Color, February 20

=== 2014 ===
- Reed College, Portland, OR, Nothing Disappears: Site/Environment/Installation and the Re-alignments Happening in My Imagination, April 17
- Brown University, Brown International Advanced Research Institutes (BIARI) Connections and Flows: Water, Energy and Digital Information in the Global South, Studio South Zero: Looking at Urban Ecological Aesthetics, June 19
