= Osiris and Isis =

Painting by Anselm Kiefer

Osiris and Isis, 379.73 cm × 561.34 cm (149.50 in × 221.00 in), San Francisco Museum of Modern Art

Osiris and Isis (German: Osiris und Isis) is a painting made by the German artist Anselm Kiefer in 1985–1987. It shows an Egyptian mastaba and incorporates a circuit board, copper wires and porcelain shards. Through its title, it evokes the Osiris myth. Critics have discussed its treatment of history, meaningfulness and matter, and possible connections to Christianity and Gnosticism. The painting is in the collection of the San Francisco Museum of Modern Art.

== Subject and composition ==
The picture of Osiris and Isis is filled by a mastaba, a type of ancient Egyptian tomb which was a precursor to the Egyptian pyramids. Above the building is an electronic circuit board from which 14 copper wires hang. At the end of each wire is a shard of porcelain.

The title evokes the Osiris myth, in which the dismembered Egyptian god Osiris is reassembled by his sister-wife Isis. The myth was used in ancient Egypt as an origin story for the Pharaonic dynasties, who were said to descend from Osiris and Isis. The German artist Anselm Kiefer says he became interested in the myth through his interest in correspondences between spiritual power and technology. He says both the story of Osiris and the story of nuclear power are about regeneration, and he stresses how Isis in the myth is unable to find Osiris' penis, arguing that a nuclear reactor is "a kind of penis".

Kiefer made Osiris and Isis in 1985–1987. It has the surface dimensions of 379.73 by 561.34 centimetres (149.50 in × 221.00 in) and a depth of 24.13 centimetres (9.50 in). It was painted in oil and acrylic emulsion, with a real circuit board, copper wires and pieces of a porcelain sink attached.

== Reception ==
Kay Larson of New York likens Osiris and Isis to the works of Kiefer's former mentor Joseph Beuys, but says Kiefer elaborates Beuys' way of working by infusing painting with "history, narrative, mystery, and myth", and succeeds at "creating the possibility of a dark redemption in the midst of violent times". David A. Siedell writes in Image that although the painting depicts a physical building and has been interpreted in relation to the Chernobyl disaster, it differs from Kiefer's more historical paintings such as Shulamite (1983) and Ash Flower (1983–1997) because of its "disembodied mythic register".

The scholar Frank Burch Brown discusses Osiris and Isis in the context of Christian culture, where evocations of otherworldly transcendence are preferred to corporal and temporal themes. He says Osiris and Isis portrays "the charred remnants of sacred and political power", beyond "restoration or demolition", evoking a world with "nothing inherently holy and abiding, and nonetheless something More is signalled by what is taken to be only a sign and neither presence nor geuine mediator". Donald Kuspit writes in Artforum that Osiris and Isis is "extraordinarily ambitious" in its attempt to address issues of meaningfulness, art, nuclear fission, creation, destruction, matter and the body. He likens the way it presents history and the world to themes present in Gnosticism, writing that just like "the Gnostics believed that matter is evil and that salvation comes through spiritual truth, [Kiefer's] works suggest that all body is 'unregenerate' substance that must be regenerated through art".

== Provenance ==
Osiris and Isis was exhibited at the Marian Goodman Gallery in New York in May 1987. It hung opposite another large Kiefer painting, Burning Rods (German: Brennstäbe), which depicts what presumably are control rods from a nuclear reactor. The San Francisco Museum of Modern Art purchased Osiris and Isis in 1987. The purchase was made possible through an exchange with Jean Stein and support from the Mrs. Paul L. Wattis Fund and the Doris and Donald Fisher Fund. As of 2023, it was not on display.
