= A Family (2024 film) =

2024 French documentary film

- Theatrical release poster
- French: Une famille
- Directed by: Christine Angot
- Written by: Christine Angot
- Produced by: Bertrand Faivre; Alice Girard
- Cinematography: Caroline Champetier; Inês Tagarin; Hugo Martin
- Edited by: Pauline Gaillard
- Production companies: Madison Films; Le Bureau and Rectangle Productions
- Distributed by: Nour Films
- Release dates: 18 February 2024 (Berlinale); 20 March 2024 (France)
- Running time: 82 minutes
- Country: France
- Language: French

A Family (French: Une famille) is a 2024 documentary film directed by Christine Angot in her directorial debut. It is an autobiographical documentary which questions the words within a family which was struck by incest.

It was selected in the Encounters at the 74th Berlin International Film Festival, where it had its world premiere on 18 February 2024. The film was also nominated for the Berlinale Documentary Film Award.

It was theatrically released in France on 20 March 2024.

== Contents ==
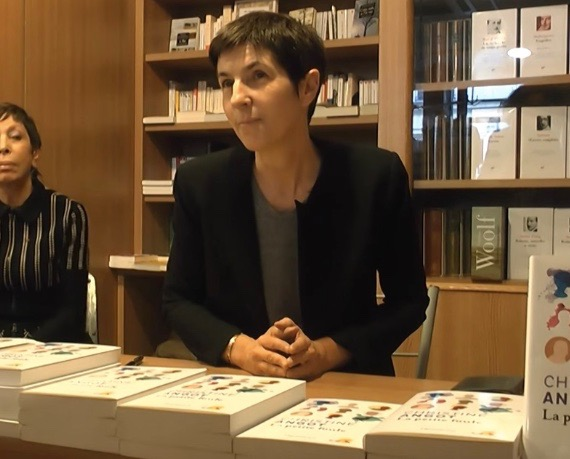
Meeting with Christine Angot at the bookstore Les notebooks de Colette on April 5, 2014.

Christine Angot, a novelist, goes back to Strasbourg with a camera as part of her book tour. She first met her father there when she was thirteen and spent some holidays with him. It is then, when he began to rape her. He died a long time ago, but his family still lives in the same place. She decides to knock on their door. She then starts a filmic journey that explores the unspoken, in the now and the then, with other relatives, the mother, the daughter, the spouse... and gradually reaches out to wider social circles. The autobiographical debut film shows and questions what the members of a family that was affected by incest say.

== Production ==
The film is produced by Madison Films and Le Bureau and Rectangle Productions and distributed by Nour Films.

== Release ==
A Family had its world premiere on 18 February 2024, as part of the 74th Berlin International Film Festival, in Encounters.

It was released in French theaters on 20 March 2024 by Nour Films.

== Reception ==
Fabien Lemercier reviewing the film at Berlinale for Cineuropa wrote, "Christine Angot lifts the veil on the unthinkable in a radical, highly personal and incredibly powerful documentary about the incest she was subjected to in her youth."

== Accolades ==
Award	Date of ceremony	Category	Recipient	Result	Ref.
Berlin International Film Festival	25 February 2024	Encounters Golden Bear Plaque for Best Film	Christine Angot	Nominated	
Berlin International Film Festival	25 February 2024	Berlinale Documentary Film Award	Christine Angot	Nominated	
Berlin International Film Festival	25 February 2024	Tagesspiegel Readers’ Jury Award	A Family	Won	
