= Zack Rogow =

American dramatist

Zack Rogow (born 1952) is an American poet, playwright, translator, and critic. He was born in New York City, and currently resides in Berkeley, California.

Rogow is the author of nine books of poetry, including "Irreverent Litanies," from Regal House Publishing; and "Talking with the Radio: poems inspired by jazz and popular music" and My Mother and the Ceiling Dancers, both published by Kattywompus Press; and The Number Before Infinity, published by Scarlet Tanager Books. His translations from French into English include works by George Sand, André Breton, Colette, and Marcel Pagnol. His co-translation of Earthlight by André Breton received the 1994 PEN Translation Prize. His sequence of short poems, Airplane Tanka, was a cowinner of the 2006 Tanka Splendor Award.

The anthologies that Rogow has edited include The Face of Poetry, a selection of work by contemporary U.S. poets with photos of the writers by Margaretta K. Mitchell, published by University of California Press. He also edited two volumes of the journal TWO LINES.

He has written four plays in a series about contemporary world writers. The fourth in this series, Colette Uncensored, a one-woman show about the French writer Colette, was coauthored by actress, Lorri Holt. Holt played the part of Colette when the play had its first staged reading at the Kennedy Center in Washington DC in February 2015, and again when the play ran at The Marsh in San Francisco and Berkeley, California, in 2016 and 2017, and in London at the Canal Café Theatre in 2018. The other plays in the series concern the life and work of Léopold Sédar Senghor, Nâzım Hikmet, and Yosano Akiko.

Rogow cofounded the Lunch Poems Reading Series at University of California, Berkeley with Professor Robert Hass and is a contributing editor of Catamaran Literary Reader.

In June 2026, Rogow was a guest on the Off the Shelf podcast.
