= Anselm Kiefer in Conversation with Klaus Dermutz =

2010 book by Anselm Kiefer and Klaus Dermutz

- Author: Anselm Kiefer; Klaus Dermutz
- Original title: Die Kunst geht knapp nicht unter
- Translator: Tess Lewis
- Language: German
- Genre: interviews
- Publisher: Suhrkamp Verlag
- Publication date: 1 October 2010
- Publication place: Germany
- English publication date: 2022
- Pages: 270
- ISBN: 9783518421871

Anselm Kiefer in Conversation with Klaus Dermutz (German: Die Kunst geht knapp nicht unter. Anselm Kiefer im Gespräch mit Klaus Dermutz, lit. 'The Art Barely Doesn't Perish/Go Under') is a 2010 book of interviews with the German artist Anselm Kiefer, conducted by the Austrian writer Klaus Dermutz. It was published in English translation in 2022.

== Summary ==
Throughout eleven conversations with the Berlin-based Austrian writer and theologian Klaus Dermutz, the German artist Anselm Kiefer talks about his influences, subjects, approaches and materials. The book's German title, Die Kunst geht knapp nicht unter, comes from a written line on Kiefer's 1975 watercolour painting Nordkap, and was inspired by the impression of seeing the sun merely touch the horizon before rising again at North Cape in Norway.

== Reception ==
Marie Luise Knott of Deutschlandfunk wrote that the book deviates from the typical, trendy artist-conversation book by avoiding going into biographical details, and that Dermutz instead "creates a trusting space for conversation where Kiefer can reveal traces and paths in his work". She wrote that the repetitions of some subjects, which result from the multiple interview sessions, may first appear redundant, but as the book goes on, they reveal more facets of the subjects. She wrote that the book's greatest merit is the way it sharpens the perception of the particular energy that exists in Kiefer's visuals. In his review for Deutschlandfunk Kultur, Michael Opitz described the content as "highly insightful studio discussions" that provide very valuable information for those who seek a deeper understanding of Kiefer's works.
