= Anselm Kiefer =

German painter and sculptor (born 1945)

- Born: 8 March 1945 (age 81); Donaueschingen, Greater German Reich
- Known for: Painting, Sculpture, Mixed media
- Notable work: The Hierarchy of Angels (painting); The Secret Life of Plants (sculpture); Grane (woodcut)
- Spouse(s): Monika Kiefer (divorced), Renate Graf (div. 2014)
- Children: 5
- Awards: Praemium Imperiale

Grane (1980-1993), Woodcut with paint and collage on paper mounted on linen, Museum of Modern Art, New York

Anselm Kiefer (born 8 March 1945) is a German painter and sculptor. He studied with Peter Dreher and Horst Antes at the end of the 1960s. His works incorporate materials such as straw, ash, clay, lead, and shellac. The poems of Paul Celan have played a role in developing Kiefer's themes of German history and the horrors of the Holocaust, as have the spiritual concepts of Kabbalah.

When he was 18, Kiefer set out on a year-long tour to visit places in The Netherlands, Belgium and France which had associations with Van Gogh. Excerpts from the diary that he kept indicate how strongly he was influenced by Van Gogh.

In his entire body of work, Kiefer argues with the past and addresses taboo and controversial issues from recent history. Themes from Nazi rule are particularly reflected in his work; for instance, the painting Margarete (oil and straw on canvas) was inspired by Celan's well-known poem "Todesfuge" ("Death Fugue").

His works are characterised by an unflinching willingness to confront his culture's dark past, and unrealised potential, in works that are often done on a large, confrontational scale well suited to the subjects. It is also characteristic of his work to find signatures and names of people of historical importance, legendary figures or historical places. All of these are encoded sigils through which Kiefer seeks to process the past; this has resulted in his work being linked with the movements New Symbolism and Neo-Expressionism.

Kiefer has lived and worked in France since 1992. Since 2008, he has lived and worked primarily in Paris. In 2018, he was awarded Austrian citizenship.

== Personal life and career ==
The son of a German art teacher, Kiefer was born in Donaueschingen a few months before the end of World War II. His city having been heavily bombed, Kiefer grew up surrounded by the devastation of the war. In 1951, his family moved to Ottersdorf, and he attended public school in Rastatt, graduating high school in 1965. He studied pre-law and Romance languages at the University of Freiburg. However, after three semesters he switched to art, studying at art academies in Freiburg and Karlsruhe. In Karlsruhe, he studied under Peter Dreher, a realist and figurative painter. He received an art degree in 1969.

In 1971 Kiefer moved to Hornbach (Walldürn) and established a studio. He remained in the Neckar-Odenwald-Kreis until 1992; his output during this first creative time is known as The German Years. In 1992 he relocated to France.

Kiefer left his first wife and children in Germany upon his move to Barjac in 1992. From 2008 he lived in Paris, in a large house in the Marais district, with his second wife, the Austrian photographer Renate Graf, and their two children. Kiefer and Graf divorced in 2014.

In 2017, Kiefer was ranked one of the richest 1,001 individuals and families in Germany by the monthly business publication Manager Magazin.

Kiefer is the subject of the 3D documentary film Anselm (2023), directed by Wim Wenders.

== Artistic process ==
Generally, Kiefer attributes traditional mythology, books, and libraries as his main subjects and sources of inspiration. In his middle years, his inspiration came from literary figures, namely Paul Celan and Ingeborg Bachmann. His later works incorporate themes from Judeo-Christian, ancient Egyptian, and Oriental cultures, which he combines with other motifs. Cosmogony is also a large focus in his works. In all, Kiefer searches for the meaning of existence and "representation of the incomprehensible and the non-representational."

=== Philosophy ===
Kiefer values a "spiritual connection" with the materials he works with, "extracting the spirit that already lives within [them]." In doing so, he transforms his materials with acid baths and physical blows with sticks and axes, among other processes.

He often chooses materials for their alchemical properties—lead in particular. Kiefer's initial attraction to lead arose when he had to repair aging pipes in the first house he owned. Eventually, he came to admire its physical and sensory qualities and began to discover more about its connection to alchemy. Physically, Kiefer specifically likes how the metal looks during the heating and melting process when he sees many colors, especially gold, which he associates with the symbolic gold sought by alchemists.

Kiefer's use of straw in his work represents energy. He claims this is due to straw's physical qualities, including the color gold and its release of energy and heat when burned. The resulting ash makes way for new creation, thus echoing the motifs of transformation and the cycle of life.

Kiefer also values the balance between order and chaos in his work, stating, "[I]f there is too much order, [the piece] is dead; or if there is much chaos, it doesn't cohere." In addition, he cares deeply about the space in which his works reside. He states that his works "lose their power completely" if put in the wrong spaces.

== Work ==
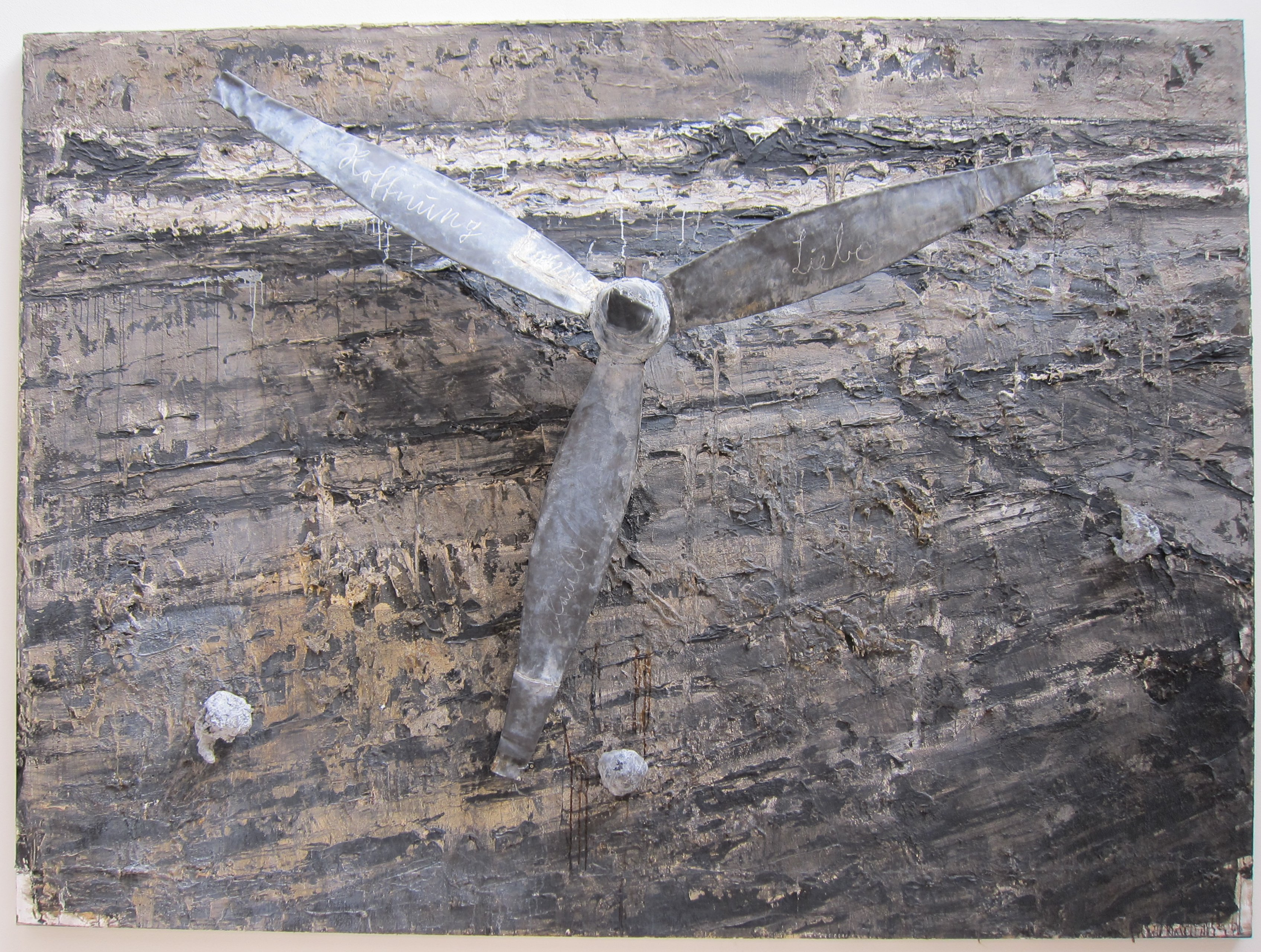
Faith, Hope, Love by Anselm Kiefer, Art Gallery of New South Wales

=== Photography ===
Kiefer began his career creating performances and documenting them in photographs titled Occupations and Heroische Sinnbilder (Heroic Symbols). Dressed in his father's Wehrmacht uniform, Kiefer mimicked the Nazi salute in various locations in France, Switzerland and Italy. He asked Germans to remember and to acknowledge the loss to their culture through the mad xenophobia of the Third Reich. In 1969, at Galerie am Kaiserplatz, Karlsruhe, he presented his first solo exhibition "Besetzungen (Occupations)" with a series of photographs of controversial political actions.

=== Painting and sculpture ===
Kiefer is best known for his paintings, which have grown increasingly large in scale with additions of lead, broken glass, and dried flowers or plants. This results in encrusted surfaces and thick layers of impasto.

By 1970, while studying informally under Joseph Beuys at Kunstakademie Düsseldorf, his stylistic leanings resembled Georg Baselitz's approach. He worked with glass, straw, wood and plant parts. The use of these materials meant that his art works became temporary and fragile, as Kiefer himself was well aware; he also wanted to showcase the materials in such a way that they were not disguised and could be represented in their natural form. The fragility of his work contrasts with the stark subject matter in his paintings. This use of familiar materials to express ideas was influenced by Beuys, who used fat and carpet felt in his works. It is also typical of the Neo-Expressionist style.

Kiefer returned to the area of his birthplace in 1971. In the years that followed, he incorporated German mythology in particular in his work, and in the next decade he studied the Kabbalah, as well as Qabalists like Robert Fludd. He went on extended journeys throughout Europe, the US and the Middle East; the latter two journeys further influenced his work. Besides paintings, Kiefer created sculptures, watercolors, photographs, and woodcuts, using woodcuts in particular to create a repertoire of figures he could reuse repeatedly in all media over the next decades, lending his work its knotty thematic coherence.

Throughout the 1970s and early 1980s, Kiefer made numerous paintings, watercolors, woodcuts, and books on themes interpreted by Richard Wagner in his four-opera cycle Der Ring des Nibelungen (The Ring of the Nibelung). In the early 1980s, he created more than thirty paintings, painted photographs, and watercolors that refer in their titles and inscriptions to the Romanian Jewish writer Paul Celan's poem "Todesfuge" ("Death Fugue").

A series of paintings which Kiefer executed between 1980 and 1983 depict looming stone edifices, referring to famous examples of National Socialist architecture, particularly buildings designed by Albert Speer and Wilhelm Kreis. The grand plaza in To the Unknown Painter (1983) specifically refers to the outdoor courtyard of Hitler's Chancellery in Berlin, designed by Speer in 1938 in honor of the Unknown Soldier. Between 1984 and 1985, he made a series of works on paper incorporating manipulated black-and-white photographs of desolate landscapes with utility poles and power lines. Such works, like Heavy Cloud (1985), were an indirect response to the controversy in West Germany in the early 1980s about NATO's stationing of tactical nuclear missiles on German soil and the placement of nuclear fuel processing facilities.

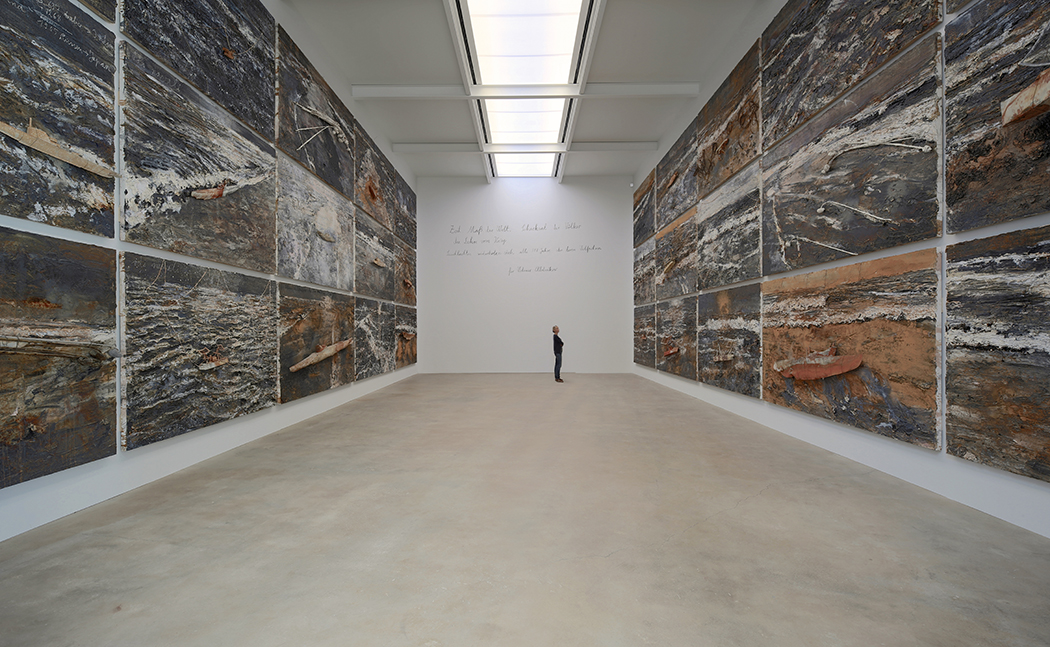
Installation view of the "Anselm Kiefer" exhibition by the Hall Art Foundation 2013

By the mid-1980s, Kiefer's themes widened from a focus on Germany's role in civilization to the fate of art and culture in general. His work became more sculptural and involved not only national identity and collective memory, but also occult symbolism, theology and mysticism. The theme of all the work is the trauma experienced by entire societies, and the continual rebirth and renewal in life. During the 1980s his paintings became more physical, and featured unusual textures and materials. The range of his themes broadened to include references to ancient Hebrew and Egyptian history, as in the large painting Osiris and Isis (1985–87). His paintings of the 1990s, in particular, explore the universal myths of existence and meaning rather than those of national identity. From 1995 to 2001, he produced a cycle of large paintings of the cosmos.

Over the years Kiefer has made many unusual works, but one work stands out among the rest as particularly bizarre—that work being his 20 Years of Solitude piece. Taking over 20 years to create (1971–1991), 20 Years of Solitude is a ceiling-high stack of hundreds of white-painted ledgers and handmade books, strewn with dirt and dried vegetation, whose pages are stained with the artist's semen. The word solitude in the title references the artist´s frequent masturbation onto paper during the 20 years it took to create. He asked American art critic Peter Schjeldahl to write a text for a catalog of the masturbation books. Schjeldahl attempted to oblige but ultimately failed in his endeavor. No other critic would take on the task, so the work has largely faded into obscurity.

He would shock the art world yet again at a dinner party in May 1993. Kiefer and his second wife, Renate Graf, decorated a candlelit commercial loft in New York with white muslin and skinned animals hanging on hooks above a floor carpeted with white sand, and staffed it with waiters dressed as mimes with white-face. A handful of art world elite, such as the likes of Sherrie Levine, were served several courses of arcane organ meats, such as pancreas, that were mostly white in color. Not surprisingly, the guests did not find the meal to be particularly appetizing. A group of NYC nightlife performers including Johanna Constantine, Lavinia Coop, Armen Ra and Flotilla DeBarge were hired to dress in white and mill about the West Village venue, Industria, and Anohni was hired to sing for Kiefer's guests.

Since 2002, Kiefer has worked with concrete, creating the towers destined for the Pirelli warehouses in Milan, the series of tributes to Velimir Khlebnikov (paintings of the sea, with boats and an array of leaden objects, 2004–5), a return to the work of Paul Celan with a series of paintings featuring rune motifs (2004–06), and other sculptures. In 2003, he held his first solo show at Galerie Thaddaeus Ropac, Salzburg Villa Katz, Anselm Kiefer: Am Anfang dedicated to a series of new works, centered on the recurring themes of history and myths. In 2005, he held his second exhibition in Galerie Thaddaeus Ropac's Salzburg location, Für Paul Celan which focused on Kiefer's preoccupation with the book, linking references to Germanic mythology with the poetry of Paul Celan, a German-speaking Jew from Czernowitz. The exhibition featured eleven works on canvas, a series of bound books shown in display cases, and five sculptures, including one powerful, monumental outdoor sculpture of reinforced concrete and lead elements, two leaden piles of books combined with bronze sunflowers, lead ships and wedges, and two monumental leaden books from the series The Secret Life of Plants. The exhibition toured to Galerie Thaddaeus Ropac, Paris and Galerie Yvon Lambert, Paris, the following year.

In 2006, Kiefer's exhibition, Velimir Chlebnikov, was first shown in a small studio near Barjac, then moved to White Cube in London, then finishing in the Aldrich Contemporary Art Museum in Connecticut. The work consists of 30 large (2 × 3 meters) paintings, hanging in two banks of 15 on facing walls of an expressly constructed corrugated steel building that mimics the studio in which they were created. The work refers to the eccentric theories of the Russian futurist philosopher/poet Velimir Chlebnikov, who invented a "language of the future" called "Zaum", and who postulated that cataclysmic sea battles shift the course of history once every 317 years. In his paintings, Kiefer's toy-like battleships—misshapen, battered, rusted and hanging by twisted wires—are cast about by paint and plaster waves. The work's recurrent color notes are black, white, gray, and rust; and their surfaces are rough and slathered with paint, plaster, mud and clay.

In 2007, he became the first artist to be commissioned to install a permanent work at the Louvre, Paris, since Georges Braque some 50 years earlier. The same year, he inaugurated the Monumenta exhibitions series at the Grand Palais in Paris, with works paying special tribute to the poets Paul Celan and Ingeborg Bachmann.

In 2009 Kiefer mounted two exhibitions at the White Cube gallery in London. A series of forest diptychs and triptychs enclosed in glass vitrines, many filled with dense Moroccan thorns, was titled Karfunkelfee, a term from German Romanticism stemming from a poem by the post-war Austrian writer Ingeborg Bachmann. In The Fertile Crescent, Kiefer presented a group of epic paintings inspired by a trip to India fifteen years earlier where he first encountered rural brick factories. Over the past decade, the photographs that Kiefer took in India "reverberated" in his mind to suggest a vast array of cultural and historical references, reaching from the first human civilization of Mesopotamia to the ruins of Germany in the aftermath of the Second World War, where he played as a boy. "Anyone in search of a resonant meditation on the instability of built grandeur", wrote the historian Simon Schama in his catalogue essay, "would do well to look hard at Kiefer's The Fertile Crescent".

In Morgenthau Plan (2012), the gallery is filled with a sculpture of a golden wheat field, enclosed in a five-meter-high steel cage. That same year, Kiefer inaugurated Galerie Thaddaeus Ropac's gallery space in Pantin, with an exhibition of monumental new works, Die Ungeborenen. The exhibition was accompanied by a publication with a letter by Anselm Kiefer and essays by Alexander Kluge and Emmanuel Daydé. He continues to be represented by the gallery and participates in group and solo exhibitions at their various locations.

=== Books ===
In 1969 Kiefer began to design books. Early examples are typically worked-over photographs; his more recent books consist of sheets of lead layered with paint, minerals, or dried plant matter. For example, he assembled numerous lead books on steel shelves in libraries, as symbols of the stored, discarded knowledge of history. The book Rhine (1981) comprises a sequence of 25 woodcuts that suggest a journey along the Rhine River; the river is central to Germany's geographical and historical development, acquiring an almost mythic significance in works such as Wagner's Ring of the Nibelungs. Scenes of the unspoiled river are interrupted by dark, swirling pages that represent the sinking of the battleship Bismarck in 1941, during an Atlantic sortie codenamed Rhine Exercise.

=== Studios ===
Kiefer's first large studio was in the attic of his home, a former schoolhouse in Hornbach. Years later he installed his studio in a factory building in Buchen, near Hornbach. In 1988, Kiefer transformed a former brick factory in Höpfingen (also near Buchen) into an extensive artwork including numerous installations and sculptures. In 1991, after twenty years of working in the Odenwald, the artist left Germany to travel around the world—to India, Mexico, Japan, Thailand, Indonesia, Australia, and the United States. In 1992 he established himself in Barjac, France, where he transformed his 35-hectare studio compound La Ribaute into a Gesamtkunstwerk. A derelict silk factory, his studio is enormous and in many ways is a comment on industrialization. He created an extensive system of glass buildings, archives, installations, storerooms for materials and paintings, subterranean chambers and corridors.

Sophie Fiennes filmed Kiefer's studio complex in Barjac for her documentary study Over Your Cities Grass Will Grow (2010), which recorded both the environment and the artist at work. One critic wrote of the film: "Building almost from the ground up in a derelict silk factory, Kiefer devised an artistic project extending over acres: miles of corridors, huge studio spaces with ambitious landscape paintings and sculptures that correspond to monumental constructions in the surrounding woodland, and serpentine excavated labyrinths with great earthy columns that resemble stalagmites or termite mounds. Nowhere is it clear where the finished product definitively stands; perhaps it is all work in progress, a monumental concept-art organism."

During 2008, Kiefer left his studio complex at Barjac and moved to Paris. A fleet of 110 lorries transported his work to a 35,000 sq ft (3,300 m^{2}) warehouse in Croissy-Beaubourg, outside of Paris, that had once been the depository for the La Samaritaine department store. A journalist wrote of Kiefer's abandoned studio complex: "He left behind the great work of Barjac – the art and buildings. A caretaker looks after it. Uninhabited, it quietly waits for nature to take over, because, as we know, over our cities grass will grow". Kiefer spent the summer of 2019 living and working at Barjac."

== Works ==
- The Second Sinful Fall of Parmenides (Der zweite Sündenfall des Parmenides), 1969. Oil on canvas, 82 5/8 x 98 3/8" (210x250 cm), Private Collection.
- You're a Painter (Du bist Maler), 1969. Bound book, 9 7/8 × 7 1/2 x 3/8" (25 x 19 x 1 cm), Private Collection.
- Plate I, German Line of Spiritual Salvation, 1975, Deutsche Heilsline, Watercolor on paper, 9 7/16 x 13 3/8" (24 X 34 cm), Private Collection.
- Pages from "Occupations" ("Besetzungen"), 1969. From Interfunktionen (Cologne), no. 12 (1975).
- Plate 2, Every Human Being Stands beneath His Own Dome of Heaven (Jeder Mensch steht unter seinem Himmelskugel), 1970, Watercolor and pencil on paper, 15 3/4 x 18 7/8", (40 x 48 cm), Private Collection.
- Double-page photographic image with foldout from The Flooding of Heidelberg (Die Überschwemmung Heidelbergs), 1969, 11 7/8 × 8 1/2 x 7/8" (30.2 x 21.7 x 2.3 cm) (bound volume), Private Collection.
- Double-page photographic images from The Flooding of Heidelberg (Die Überschwemmung Heidelbergs), 1969.
- Untitled (Ohne Titel), 1971, Oil on canvas (in two parts), each 86 5/8 x 39 3/8" (220 x 100 cm), Collection of Dr. Gunther Gercken, Lutjensee, West Germany.
- Plate 3, Winter Landscape (Winterlandschaft), 1970, Watercolor on paper, 16 15/16 x 14 3/16" (43 x 36 cm), Private Collection.
- Plate 4, Reclining Man with Branch (Liegender Mann mit Zweig), 1971, Watercolor on paper, 9 7/16 x 11" (24 x 28 cm), Private Collection.
- Plate 5, Fulia, 1971, Watercolor and pencil on paper, 18 11/16 x 14 3/16" (47.5 x 36 cm), Private Collection.
- Quaternity (Quaternität), 1973, Charcoal and oil on burlap, 118 1/8 x 171 1/4" (300 x 435 cm), Collection of George Baselitz, Derneburg, West Germany.
- Father, Son, Holy Ghost (Vater, Sohn, heiliger Geist), 1973, Oil on burlap, 65 x 61 1/2" (165 x 156 cm), Collection of Dr. Gunther Gerken, Lutjensee, West Germany.
- Faith, Hope, Love (Glaube, Hoffnung, Liebe), 1973, Charcoal on burlap, with cardboard, 117 3/8 x 110 5/8" (298 x 281 cm). Staatsgalerie Stuttgart.
- Plate 6, Man in the Forest (Mann im Wald), 1971, Oil on muslin, 68 1/2 x 74 7/16" (174 x 189 cm), Private Collection.
- Plate 7, Resurrexit, 1973, oil, acrylic and charcoal on burlap, 114 3/16 x 70 7/8" (290 x 180 cm). Collection Sanders, Amsterdam.
- Plate 8, Nothung (Notung), 1973, oil and charcoal on burlap, with oil and charcoal on cardboard, 118 1/8 x 170" (300 x 432 cm). Museum Boymans-van Beuningen, Rotterdam.
- Plate 10, Germany's Spiritual Heroes (Deutschlands Geisteshelden), 1973, oil and charcoal on burlap, mounted on canvas, 120 7/8 x 268 1/2" (307 x 682 cm). Collection of Barbara and Eugene Schwartz, New York.
- Double-page from Heroic Allegories (Heroische Sinnbilder), 1969, photography on cardboard, with pastel and pencil, 26 x 19 5/8 x 4" ( 66 x 50 x 10 cm), Private Collection.
- Operation Winter Storm (Unternehmen "Wintergewitter"), 1975, oil on burlap, 47 1/4 x 59" (120 x 150 cm), Private Collection.
- The Lake of Gennesaret (See Genezareth), 1974, oil emulsion, and shellac on burlap, 41 1/4 x 67" (105 x 170 cm), Private Collection.
- Plate 11, Landscape with Head (Landschaft mit Kopf), 1973, oil, distemper, and charcoal on cardboard, 82 11/16 x 94 1/2" (210 x 240 cm), Private Collection.
- Plate 12, Cockchafer Fly (Maikäfer flieg), 1974, oil on burlap, 86 5/8 x 118 1/8" (220 x 300 cm), Saatchi Collection, London.
- Plate 13, March Heath (Märkische Heide), oil, acrylic and shellac on burlap, 46 1/2 x 100" (118 x 254 cm), Van Abbemuseum, Eindhoven, The Netherlands.
- There is Peace upon Every Mountain Peak (Über allen Gipfeln ist Ruh!), 1973, watercolor on paper, 12 3/8 x 18 7/8" (31.5 x 48 cm), Private Collection.
- Plate 14, Operation Sea Lion I (Unternehmen "Seelöwe"), 1975, oil on canvas, 86 5/8 x 118 1/8" (220 x 300 cm), Collection of Norman and Irma Braman, Miami Beach.
- Plate 15, Piet Mondrian- Operation Sea Lion (Piet Mondrian- Unternehmen "Seelöwe"), 1975, thirty-four double-page photographic images, mounted on cardboard and bound, 22 7/16 x 16 1/2 x 2" (57 x 42 5 cm) (bound volume), Collection of Marian Goodman, New York.
- Plate 16, March Sand V (Märkischer Sand V), 1977, twenty-five double page photographic images, with sand, oil, and glue, mounted on cardboard and bound, 24 3/8 x 16 5/8 × 3 3/8" (62 x 42 x 8.5 cm) (bound volume), Collection of Mr. and Mrs. Andrew Saul, New York.
- Double-page photographic images from Hoffmann von Fallersleben auf Helgoland, 1978 (Groningen, 1980), 11 7/8 × 8 1/2 x 1/2" (30.2 x 21.6 x 1.3 cm) (bound volume), Private Collection.
- Plate 17, Varus, 1976, oil and acrylic on burlap, 78 3/4 x 106 5/16" (200 x 270 cm), Van Abbemuseum, Eindhoven, The Netherlands.
- Double-page from Germany's Facial Type (Charcoal for 2000 Years) (Das deutsche Volksgesicht [Kohle fur 2000 Jahre]), 1974, charcoal on paper, with woodcut, 22 7/16 x 17 3/4 × 2 3/8" (57 x 45 x 6 cm) (bound volume), Private Collection.
- Heliogabalus (Heliogabal), 1974, watercolor on paper, 11 3/4 x 15 3/4" (30 x 40 cm), Collection of Fredrik Roos, Switzerland.
- Plate 18, Ways of Worldly Wisdom (Wege der Weltweisheit), 1976–77, oil, acrylic, and shellac on burlap, mounted on canvas, 120 x 196 7/8" (305 x 500 cm), Collection Sanders, Amsterdam.
- Plate 19, Ways of Worldly Wisdom- Arminius's Battle (Wege der Weltweisheit-die Hermanns-Schlacht), 1978–80, woodcut, with acrylic and shellac, mounted on canvas, 126 x 196 7/8" (320 x 500 cm), The Art Institute of Chicago.
- Plate 20, Stefan!, 1975, watercolor and ball point pen on paper, 8 1/16 x 11 1/4" (20.5 x 28.5 cm), Collection of Johannes Gachenang, Bern.
- Siegfried Forgets Brunhilde (Siegfried vergisst Brunhilde), 1975, oil on canvas, 51 1/8 x 67" (130 x 170 cm), Family H. de Groot Collection, Groningen, The Netherlands.

== Exhibitions ==
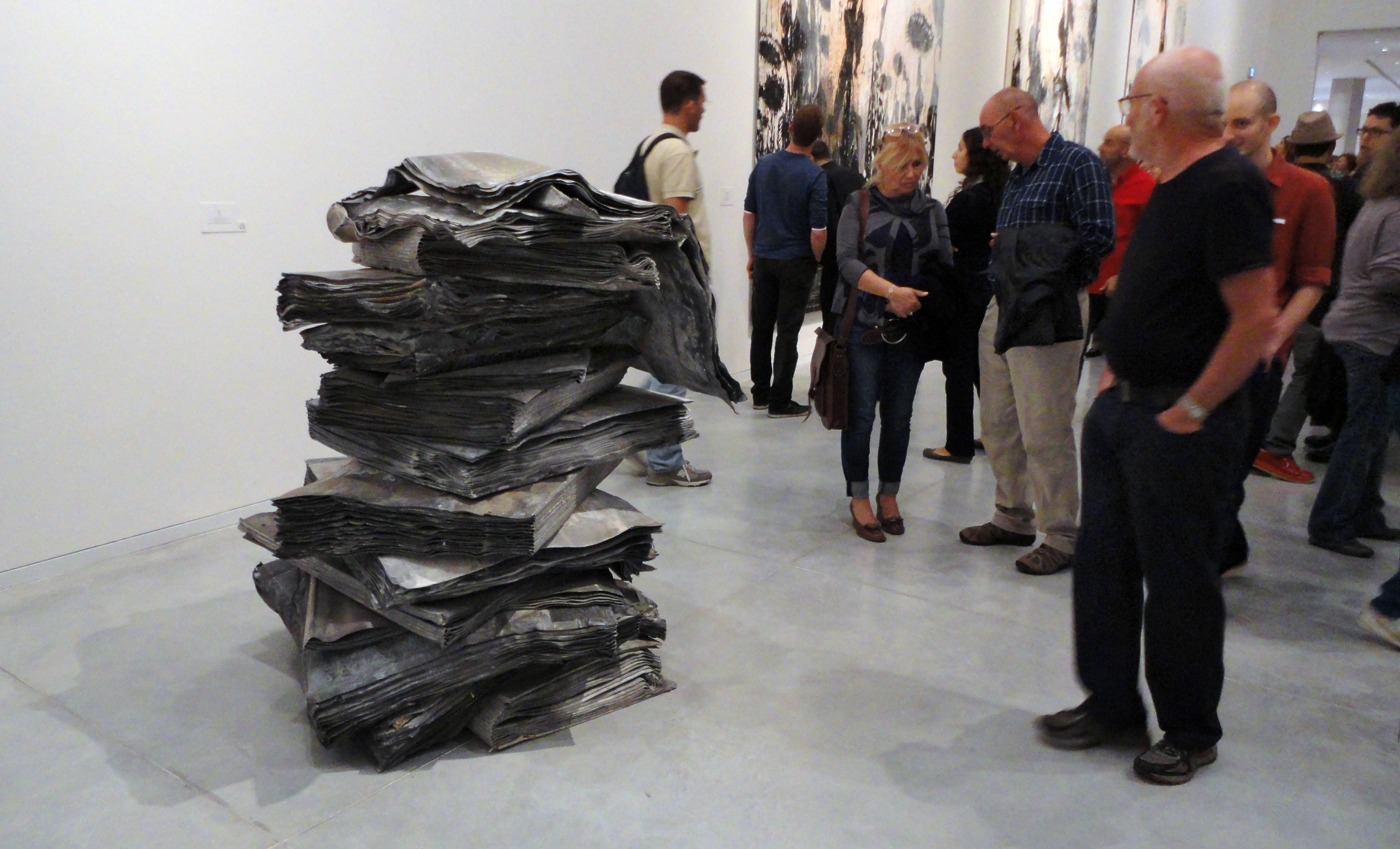
Opening of the Exhibitions "Shevirat Ha-Kelim" (Breaking of the Vessels) at the Tel Aviv Museum of Art, 1 November 2011

In 1969, Kiefer had his first solo exhibition, at Galerie am Kaiserplatz in Karlsruhe. Along with Georg Baselitz, he represented Germany at the Venice Biennale in 1980. He was also featured in the 1997 Venice Biennale with a solo show held at the Museo Correr, concentrating on paintings and books.

Comprehensive solo exhibitions of Kiefer's work have been organized by the Kunsthalle Düsseldorf (1984); Art Institute of Chicago (1987); Sezon Museum of Art in Tokyo (1993); Neue Nationalgalerie in Berlin (1991); Metropolitan Museum of Art in New York (1998); Fondation Beyeler in Basel (2001); the Modern Art Museum of Fort Worth (2005); the Hirshhorn Museum and Sculpture Garden in Washington D.C. (2006); the San Francisco Museum of Modern Art and the Guggenheim Museum Bilbao (2007). In 2007, the Guggenheim Museum Bilbao presented an extensive survey of recent work. Several of his works were exhibited in 2009 for the first time in the Balearic Islands, at the Es Baluard museum in Palma de Mallorca. In 2012, the Art Gallery of Hamilton presented some of his paintings. London's Royal Academy of Arts mounted the first British retrospective of the artist's work in September 2014.

In 2007 Kiefer was commissioned to create a huge site-specific installation of sculptures and paintings for the inaugural "Monumenta" at the Grand Palais, Paris. With the unveiling of a triptych – the mural Athanor and the two sculptures Danae and Hortus Conclusus – at the Louvre in 2007, Kiefer became the first living artist to create a permanent site-specific installation in the museum since Georges Braque in 1953.

In 2008, Kiefer installed Palmsonntag (Palm Sunday) (2006), a monumental palm tree and 36 steel-and-glass reliquary tablets in the auditorium-gym of the First Baptist Church of Los Angeles, an enormous Italian Romanesque edifice built in 1927. The room was reconfigured to accommodate the work. Floors were sanded to remove the basketball court's markings, and the wall for the reliquary paintings was constructed inside the space. In 2010 the piece was installed at the Art Gallery of Ontario museum in Toronto, where Kiefer created eight new panels specifically for the AGO's exhibition of this work.

In 2009, the Metropolitan Museum of Art exhibited Broken Flowers and Grass: Nature and Landscape in the Drawings of Anselm Kiefer, displaying Kiefer’s landscape paintings.

In Next Year in Jerusalem (2010) at Gagosian Gallery, Kiefer explained that each of the works was a reaction to a personal "shock" initiated by something he had recently heard of.

Kiefer's 2012 exhibition Let a Thousand Flowers Bloom (including a 2000 piece of the same title), depicts figures of Mao Zedong with landscapes of flowers. The works reference China's Hundred Flowers Campaign.

In September 2013, The Hall Art Foundation, in partnership with the Massachusetts Museum of Contemporary Art, opened a long-term installation of sculpture and paintings in a specifically repurposed, 10,000 square-foot building on the MASS MoCA campus. In 2014, the Foundation landscaped the area surrounding this building in order to present long-term installations of outdoor sculpture. The long-term exhibition—includes Étroits sont les Vaisseaux (Narrow are the Vessels) (2002), an 82-foot long, undulating wave-like sculpture made of cast concrete, exposed rebar, and lead; The Women of the Revolution (Les Femmes de la Revolution) (1992), composed of more than twenty lead beds with photographs and wall text; Velimir Chlebnikov (2004), a steel pavilion containing 30 paintings dealing with nautical warfare and inspired by the quixotic theories of the Russian mathematical experimentalist Velimir Chlebnikov; and a new, large-format photograph on lead created by the artist for the installation at MASS MoCA.

In 2015, the Centre Pompidou, the Bibliothèque Nationale in Paris, and the Museum der bildenden Künste in Leipzig hosted a retrospective exhibition in honor of Kiefer's 70th birthday.

In 2016 the Albertina in Vienna dedicated an exhibition to his woodcuts, showing 35 made between 1977 and 2015, with an accompanying catalogue.

In 2017, the Met Breuer presented Provocations: Anselm Kiefer at The Met Breuer, an exhibit of works that spanned his career.

He unveiled his first public art commission in the United States in May 2018, at Rockefeller Center. The Uraeus sculpture was inspired in part by the religious symbols of Egypt and Thus Spoke Zarathustra. It was put on view until 22 July.

From October 18, 2025 to January 25, 2026, the Saint Louis Art Museum exhibited Anselm Kiefer: Becoming the Sea, a retrospective of Kiefer’s 60-year career. The five largest pieces from the exhibition will remain on-display until Spring 2027. A catalog accompanied the exhibit.

In 2026, Kiefer created a site-specific installation entitled The Women Alchemists in Milan's Sala delle Cariatidi as part of the cultural showcase of the 2026 Winter Olympics. It features 42 canvases celebrating historic—and largely forgotten—women scientists, alchemists and apothecaries, including Sophie Brahe, Isabella Cortese, Camilla Erculiani, Anna Maria Zieglerin, Lady Margaret Clifford, and Leona Constantia. The exhibit reflects his longstanding interest in history-making women, and Kiefer hopes he can make "a correction to history".

== Recognition ==
In 1990, Kiefer was awarded the Wolf Prize. In 1999 the Japan Art Association awarded him the Praemium Imperiale for his lifetime achievements. In the explanatory statement it reads:

"A complex critical engagement with history runs through Anselm Kiefer's work. His paintings as well as the sculptures of Georg Baselitz created an uproar at the 1980 Venice Biennale: the viewers had to decide whether the apparent Nazi motifs were meant ironically or whether the works were meant to convey actual fascist ideas. Kiefer worked with the conviction that art could heal a traumatized nation and a vexed, divided world. He created epic paintings on giant canvases that called up the history of German culture with the help of depictions of figures such as Richard Wagner or Goethe, thus continuing the historical tradition of painting as a medium of addressing the world. Only a few contemporary artists have such a pronounced sense of art's duty to engage the past and the ethical questions of the present, and are in the position to express the possibility of the absolution of guilt through human effort."

In 2008, Kiefer was awarded the Peace Prize of the German Book Trade, given for the first time to a visual artist. Art historian Werner Spies said in his speech that Kiefer is a passionate reader who takes impulses from literature for his work. In 2011 Kiefer was appointed to the chair of creativity in art at the Collège de France.

- 1983 – Hans-Thoma-Preis of Baden-Württemberg
- 1985 – Carnegie Prize
- 1990 – Wolf Prize in Arts
- 1990 – Goslarer Kaiserring
- 1999 – Praemium Imperiale
- 2002 – Officer of Ordre des Arts et des Lettres
- 2004 – Foreign Honorary Member of the American Academy of Arts and Sciences
- 2005 – Austrian Decoration for Science and Art
- 2008 – Peace Prize of the German Book Trade
- 2009 – Adenauer-de Gaulle Prize (Paris, France/Berlin, Germany)
- 2010 – Chair of Artistic Creation at the Collège de France
- 2011 – Berliner Bär (B.Z.-Kulturpreis)
- 2011 – Leo Baeck Medal, Leo Baeck Institut of New York
- 2014 – honorary doctorate in Philosophy, University of Turin
- 2015 – Honorary doctorate in letters, University of St Andrews
- 2015 – Honorary doctorate for general merit, University of Antwerp
- 2017 – J. Paul Getty Medal Award
- 2017 – Honorary doctorate University of Freiburg
- 2019 – Prize for Understanding and Tolerance, awarded by the Jewish Museum Berlin
- 2020 – Honorary Doctorate in the Communication and Teaching of Art, Brera Academy (Milan, Italy)
- 2023 – Knight Commander's Cross of the Order of Merit of the Federal Republic of Germany
- 2023 – German National Prize

== Materials ==
Due to the spontaneous nature of his creative process, many of his works have issues regarding stability—a concern shared by collectors, dealers, and curators alike. He acknowledges the issue, but says change is part of the process and that their essence will ultimately stay the same. This idea of transformation has a kind of appeal for Kiefer and thus is featured in many of his works. This fascination for the process may have stemmed from the artist's keen interest in alchemy. He often chooses materials for their alchemical properties—lead in particular being chief among them. In the case of lead, he specifically likes how the metal looks during the heating and melting process when he would see many colors—especially that of gold—which he thought of in a symbolic sense as the gold sought by alchemists. He is also particularly fond of the oxidation of white on lead. He would often try to induce oxidation artificially with the use of acid to speed up the process. Lead was also associated with the alchemical concepts of magic numbers and represented the planet Saturn.

Shellac, another material popular in his work, corresponded to lead in terms of how he felt about its color and energy possibilities. He also liked that while being polished it takes on energy and becomes warm to the touch.

The use of straw in his work is also in part the result of this common theme of energy. Straw again features the color gold and gives off energy, heat, and warmth when burned. This would make way for new creation thus continuing the cycle of life through the transformation process.

== Art market ==
The best-selling painting for the artist was The Fertile Crescent (2009), which sold for $3,997,103 at the China Guardian auction house, on 3 June 2019. The previous record belonged to the painting To the Unknown Painter (1983), sold for $3,554,500 at Christie's New York, on 11 May 2011, to an American private collector. Previously, it was held by Let a Thousand Flowers Bloom (1999), which had sold for $3,549,350 at Christie's London, on 8 February 2007.

== Collections ==
Kiefer's works are included in numerous public collections, including the Hamburger Bahnhof, Berlin; the Museum of Modern Art and the Solomon R. Guggenheim Museum, New York; Detroit Institute of Arts, Detroit; the Tate Modern, London; the San Francisco Museum of Modern Art; the Art Gallery of Ontario, Toronto; the North Carolina Museum of Art, Raleigh; the High Museum of Art, Atlanta; the Albright-Knox Art Gallery, Buffalo; the Philadelphia Museum of Art; the National Gallery of Australia, Canberra; the Tel Aviv Museum of Art; the Saint Louis Art Museum, Missouri; and the Albertina, Vienna. The Metropolitan Museum of Art in New York owns 20 of the artist's rare watercolors. Notable private collectors include Eli Broad and Andrew J. Hall.

== See also ==
- Holocaust memorial landscapes in Germany

== Bibliography ==
- Lauterwein, Andréa (2007). Anselm Kiefer/Paul Celan. London: Thames & Hudson. ISBN 978-0-500-23836-3.
- Kiefer, Anselm; Auping, Michael (2005). Anselm Kiefer. Fort Worth, Tex: Prestel Publishing. ISBN 978-3-7913-3387-8.
- Biro, Matthew (1998). Anselm Kiefer and the Philosophy of Martin Heidegger. Cambridge: Cambridge Univ. Press. ISBN 978-0-521-59170-6.
- Biro, Matthew (5 March 2013). Anselm Kiefer. London [u.a]: Phaidon Press. ISBN 978-0-7148-6143-2.
- Danto, Arthur C. (1 January 1997). "Anselm Kiefer". Encounters & Reflections. Berkeley, Calif. London: Univ of California Press. ISBN 978-0-520-20846-9.
- Fiennes, Sophie (2011), Over your cities grass will grow, London: Artificial Eye, OCLC 1043105151
- Hoerschelmann, Antonia (2016). Anselm Kiefer. Vienna Ostfildern: Hatje Cantz Verlag. ISBN 978-3-7757-4101-9.
- Stewart, Garrett (2010). "Bookwork as Demediation". Critical Inquiry. 36 (3): 410–457. doi:10.1086/653407. ISSN 0093-1896. S2CID 162264154.
- Kiefer, Anselm; Dermutz, Klaus (2022) [2010]. Anselm Kiefer in Conversation with Klaus Dermutz. Translated by Lewis, Tess. Seagull Books. ISBN 9781803090382.
