= Christine Angot =

French writer and novelist

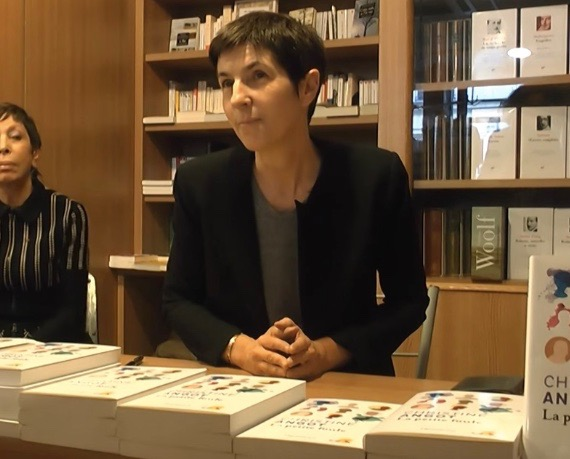
- Christine Angot in 2014
- Born: Christine Pierrette Jeanne Marie-Clotilde Schwartz; 7 February 1959 (age 67); Châteauroux, France
- Occupations: Novelist; playwright; screenwriter
- Writing career
- Language: French
- Years active: 1990–present
- Notable work: Incest (1999)
- Notable awards: Prix Médicis (2021)

Christine Angot (French: [kʁistin ɑ̃ɡo]; born 7 February 1959) is a French novelist, playwright and screenwriter.

== Life ==
Born Christine Pierrette Marie-Clotilde Schwartz (Schwartz being her mother's name) in Châteauroux, Indre, she is perhaps best known for her 1999 novel L'Inceste (Incest) which recounts an incestuous relationship with her father. It is a subject which appears in several of her previous books, but it is unclear whether these works are autofiction, and whether the events described actually took place. Angot herself describes her work – a metafiction on society's fundamental prohibition of incest and her own writings on the subject – as performative acts. (cf Quitter la ville).

She was named the winner of the Prix Sade in 2012 for Une semaine de vacances.

In 2021, she was awarded the Prix Médicis for her novel Le Voyage dans l'Est.

In collaboration with director Claire Denis, she has written two films: Let the Sunshine In (2017) and Both Sides of the Blade (2022). Both Sides of the Blade is based on her novel Un tournant de la vie (2018).

== Selected works ==
=== Novels ===
- Vu du ciel (1990)
- Not to be (1991)
- Léonore, toujours (1994)
- Interview (1995)
- Les Autres (1997)
- Sujet Angot (1998)
- L'Usage de la vie incluant Corps plongés dans un liquide, Même si et Nouvelle vague (1998)
- L'Inceste (1999) Incest, trans. Tess Lewis (Archipelago Books, 2017)
- Quitter la ville (2000)
- Normalement suivi de La Peur du lendemain (2001)
- Pourquoi le Brésil ? (2002)
- Peau d'âne (2003)
- Les Désaxés (2004)
- Une partie du cœur (2004)
- Rendez-vous (2006)
- Othoniel (2006)
- Le Marché des amants (2008)
- Les Petits (2011)
- La Petite Foule (2014)
- Un amour impossible (2015) An Impossible Love, trans. Armine Kotin Mortimer (Archipelago Books, 2021)
- Un tournant de la vie (2018)
- Le Voyage dans l'Est (2021)

=== Plays ===
- Corps plongés dans un liquide (1992)
- Nouvelle vague (1992)
- Même si (1996)
- L'Usage de la vie (1997)
- Arrêtez, arrêtons, arrête (1997)
- Mais aussi autre chose (1999)
- La Fin de l'amour (2000)
- Meinhof/Angot (2001)
- Normalement (2002)
- La Place du singe (2005)

== Films ==
- 2017: Let the Sunshine In (screenplay)
- 2022: Both Sides of the Blade (screenplay)
- 2024: A Family (director), documentary film, world premiere in Encounters at the 74th Berlin International Film Festival.
