= Max Frisch Prize =

Swiss literary award

The Max Frisch Prize of the City of Zürich, created in 1996, is usually awarded every four years to writers in German-speaking countries. The prize is named after the Swiss writer Max Frisch (1911–1991). The literary award is endowed with a prize sum of 50,000 Swiss francs. In 2018, an additional sponsorship award (Förderpreis) endowed with 10,000 Swiss francs was introduced in order to be able to support writers of the younger generation as well. The award honors authors whose work addresses fundamental issues of democratic society in an artistically uncompromising manner. The Max Frisch Foundation at ETH Zürich is responsible for judging and determining the winners. The City of Zürich is financing the award and its hosting.

== Recipients ==
- 1998: Tankred Dorst
- 2002: Jörg Steiner
- 2006: Ralf Rothmann
- 2011: Barbara Honigmann on 100th birthday of Max Frisch
- 2014: Robert Menasse
- 2018: Maja Haderlap; sponsorship award: Dorothee Elmiger
- 2022: Jonas Lüscher; sponsorship award: Enis Maci
- 2026: Michael Köhlmeier; sponsorship award: Ozan Zakariya Keskinkılıç
