= Tess Lewis =

American translator and writer

Teresa D. Lewis is an American writer, essayist and literary translator from French and German. Her translation of Austrian poet and novelist Maja Haderlap's novel Angel of Oblivion was awarded the 2017 PEN Translation Prize, the Austrian Cultural Forum NY Translation Prize, and was nominated for the BTBA. She has also translated works by Peter Handke, Walter Benjamin, Ernst Jünger, and Philippe Jaccottet. She is a recipient of fellowships from the Guggenheim Foundation, and the National Endowment for the Arts. She is a graduate of the University of Notre Dame and received the Rhodes Scholarship to the University of Oxford, New College, in 1986.

== Career ==
Lewis is an essayist and translator. Her essays, primarily about European literature, have been published in The New Criterion, The Hudson Review, World Literature Today, The American Scholar, and Bookforum. She is an advisory editor for The Hudson Review, and is also a board member for the National Books Critics Circle. From 2014 to 2015, Lewis was the curator for the Festival Neue Literature, an American literary festival based in New York, which focuses on German-language literature from Austria, Germany, and Switzerland, in English, and consists of literary events, book readings, and panels.

Lewis translates primarily from French and German into English, and has translated works by Hans Magnus Enzensberger, Alois Hotschnig, Melinda Nadj Abonji, Julya Rabinowich, Lukas Bärfuss, Philippe Jaccottet, Jean-Luc Benoziglio, Pascal Bruckner, Maja Haderlap, Peter Handke, Christine Angot, Walter Benjamin, Ernst Jünger, and Anselm Kiefer. In 2017, she published an English translation of Christine Angot's novel, Incest. Her translation was nominated for the Best Translated Book Award. In a review in the New Yorker, critic H. C. Wilentz praised Lewis's translation, noting the challenges raised by Angot's "antagonism towards conventional syntax," which made Lewis's translation "a feat of perspicuity". In Asymptote Journal, Tsipi Keller praised Lewis's translation as well, stating that "it feels as though Angot, so very French, is speaking to us directly in English." In 2015 she received a Guggenheim Foundation Fellowship to support her translation of Swiss writer Ludwig Hohl’s Notizen, a book consisting of Hohl's notes, journal entries, and reflections. In 2022, she has received a fellowship from the National Endowment of the Arts to translate In the Forest of the Metropoles by Karl-Markus Gauß.

== Translated works ==
- (2008) Peter Handke, Once Again for Thucydides (German to English, New Directions) ISBN 9-780-81121-7767
- (2012) Lukas Bärfuss, One hundred days (German to English, London : Granta) ISBN 9-781-84708-4804
- (2011) Alois Hotschnig, Ludwig’s Room (German to English, Seagull Books) ISBN 9-780-95628-4051
- (2013) Philippe Jaccottet, Seedtime: Notebooks 1954-79 (French to English, Seagull Books) ISBN 978-0-85742-167-8
- (2014) Doron Rabinovici, Elsewhere (German to English, London : Haus Publishing Ltd) ISBN 9-781-90832-3491
- (2014) Melinda Nadj Abonji, Fly Away, Pigeon (German to English, Seagull Books) ISBN 9-780-85742-3658
- (2015) Philippe Jaccottet, Obscurity (London; New York; Calcutta : Seagull Books) ISBN 9-780-85742-3078
- (2015) Anselm Kiefer, Notebooks : Volume 1: 1998-1999 (German to English, Seagull Books) ISBN 9-780-85742-3122
- (2016) Maja Haderlap: Angel of Oblivion (German to English, Brooklyn, NY : Archipelago Books) ISBN 9-780-91467-1466
- (2017) Christine Angot, Incest (French to English, Brooklyn, NY : Archipelago Books) ISBN 9-780-91467-1879
- (2017) Lutz Seiler, Kruso (German to English, Scribe Publications) ISBN 1-947-53411-4
- (2017) Klaus Merz, Stigmata of Bliss Three Novellas (German to English, Seagull Books) ISBN 978-0-85742-838-7
- (2018) Hans Magnus Enzensberger: Panopticon (Seagull Books) ISBN 9-780-85742-5034
- (2018) Monique Schwitter; One another : a novel (German to English, New York, NY : Persea Books) ISBN 9-780-89255-4973
- (2019) Walter Benjamin, The Storyteller Essays (German to English, New York, NY : New York Review of Books) ISBN 9-781-68137-0583
- (2019) Michel Layaz, My Mother's Tears (French to English, Seagull Books) ISBN 978-0-85742-652-9
- (2020) Jonas Lüscher, Kraft (German to English, New York : Farrar, Straus and Giroux) ISBN 9-780-37418-2144
- (2021) Mariana Leky, What you can see from here (German to English, New York : Farrar, Straus and Giroux) ISBN 9-780-37428-8822
- (2021) Ludwig Hohl, The Notes: On Non-premature Reconciliation, Foreword by Joshua Cohen (German to English, New Haven: Yale University Press)
- (2022) Maja Haderlap, distant transit (German to English, Brooklyn, NY: Archipelago Books) ISBN 978-1-953861-17-7
- (2022) Anselm Kiefer, Klaus Dermutz, Anselm Kiefer in Conversation with Klaus Dermutz (German to English, Seagull Books) ISBN 9781803090382
- (2022) Anne Weber, Epic Annette: A Heroine's Tale (French and German to English, London: The Indigo Press) ISBN 978-1-911648-45-1
- (2023) Ernst Jünger, On the Marble Cliffs (German to English, New York, NY: New York Review of Books) ISBN 9-781-68137-6257
- (2023) Judith Keller, The Questionable Ones (German to English (Seagull Books) ISBN 978-1-80309-146-4

== Awards and honors ==
- 2009 – PEN Translation Fund Grand for translation of Alois Hotschnig's short stories
- 2014 – Finalist for French-American Foundation Translation Prize, for a translation of Jean-Luc Benoziglio, Privy Portrait
- 2014 – Max Geilinger Translation Award for translating Philippe Jaccottet's Obscurity
- 2015 – Austrian Cultural Forum's Translation Prize for Angel of Oblivion by Maja Haderlap
- 2015 – John Simon Guggenheim Fellowship
- 2015 – PEN UK Translates! Award (for Kruso)
- 2015 – Fellowship from the Guggenheim Foundation for a translation of Ludwig Hohl’s Notizen
- 2016 – ACFNY Translation Prize
- 2017 – Jan Michalski Foundation Residency for Ludwig Hohl’s Notes
- 2017 – PEN Translation Prize for a translation of Maja Haderlap's Angel of Oblivion
- 2018 – Nominated for the Best Translated Book Award, for translating Christine Angot's Incest
- 2019 – Schlegel-Tieck Translation Prize Runner-up for Lutz Seiler’s novel Kruso
- 2020 – Finalist, French-American Foundation Translation Prize for a translation of Michel Layaz's My Mother's Tears
- 2021 – PEN UK Translates! award for Anne Weber’s novel in verse Epic Annette
- 2022 – Fellowship from the National Endowment for the Arts (USA) for a translation of In the Forest of the Metropoles by Karl-Markus Gauß
- 2022 – Berlin Prize Fellow, American Academy in Berlin
- 2022 – National Endowment of the Arts Translation Fellowship for Karl-Markus Gauß’s essays
- 2022 – PEN UK Translates! award for Lutz Seiler’s novel Star 111
