= Spring 1941 =

- Directed by: Uri Barbash
- Written by: Motti Lerner
- Based on: "A Conversation" and "A Spring Morning" by Ida Fink
- Starring: Joseph Fiennes; Neve McIntosh; Kelly Harrison
- Edited by: Tova Ascher; Jarosław Kamiński
- Release date: October 2008 (Haifa)
- Running time: 122 minutes
- Countries: Poland; Israel; Usa
- Language: English

Spring 1941 (also titled Aviv 41) is a 2008 Polish-Israeli war drama film directed by Uri Barbash and starring Joseph Fiennes, Neve McIntosh and Kelly Harrison. It is based on the short stories "A Conversation" and "A Spring Morning" by Ida Fink.

== Plot summary ==
In the 70's, Clara Planck, a well-known Canadian-Jewish cellist, arrives in her home town in Poland with her daughter to perform in a newly remodeled concert hall. While visiting the city, there are sporadic flashbacks to the events of the spring of 1941.

During the German invasion and eventual occupation, her family (Husband Arthur, a young Jewish doctor and two daughters, Lisa (6) and Eva (3). The Family attempts to escape and hide in the rural farm belonging to a sympathizer, Emilia, who had sold vegetables at local farmers' markets to them over the years. During their escape the Nazis catch them in the street and daughter Eva is shot in the back climbing a fence.

The remaining family members make their way to Emilia, who has been a recent widower. Emilia, a christian and very Aryan in appearance, hides the survivors in her attic. Clara and Lisa, who look "too" Jewish, cannot leave the attic until evening for fear of being discovered. Arthur doesn't possess the perceived features of a Jew and is able to pose as Emilia’s cousin to help work the farm in exchange during the day. Various scenes of atrocities by the Nazis compound the fears that the family is trapped in the farmhouse and cannot leave. A relationship eventually develops between him and Emilia, who is lonely and needing companionship. He is torn, but Emilia essentially admits that she will not harbor the family without Arthur fulfilling her love and providing her with her own child. Concurrently, Emilia's Brother-in-Law has aims to take her as his bride now that the brother has died. He constantly pesters Emilia who brushes off his advances and threatens to accuse him of raping her.

Clara discovers the relationship and is distraught but realizes that her life and her daughter's life depends on Emilia. Clara is perturbed and angry but allows the strange arrangement to continue. Arthur has "rules" that command him to sleep downstairs with Clara and visit his family 2 times a day. Emilia finally becomes pregnant and demands that Arthur begin favoring the new family over his Jewish family. Arthur refuses, and Emilia issues an ultimatum that he agrees to a weekly visit to the attic or leave the farm. He manages to change her mind, but Clara can no longer stand the pressure and the deceit and decides to take Lisa away. Arthur joins his Jewish family and hides them at one of his former patient’s house nearby. Sadly a day later they are discovered by the Germans and join a group of captured Jews that are marched through the town. Knowing that the Germans have captured more Jews, Emilia follows the column to look for the family. Arthur motions to Emilia to take Lisa and instructs his daughter to fade to the side of the street and stand with Emilia while the Nazis are not looking. She is seen and shot by a German guards.

The 1941 plot is interspersed with modern scenes of Clara visiting the town and the farmhouse. At various points we see Emilia or someone that looks like her as an older woman in the village and at the farm. At the farm, Clara asks the woman (who is clearly Emilia now) about her child. Emilia, upset, runs out of the farmhouse and leaves Clara alone in the house. Clara's daughter, who is now obviously from Clara's new family, has been looking for her and accuses Clara of being secretive. The daughter is upset that Clara is not confiding with her and shutting her out. Clara eventually tells the final events of that Spring where Arthur carries Lisa's body to the mass grave where at the last minute shields Clara from the bullets. Emilia's child, a son, was apparently strangled by the outraged brother-in-law shortly after birth.

The movie ends with the concert. As Clara plays all the family members, sympathetic townsfolk and Emilia with her child watching.

== Cast ==
- Joseph Fiennes
- Clare Higgins
- Neve McIntosh
- Kelly Harrison
- Mirik Baka
- Maria Pakulnis

== Release ==
The film premiered at the 24th Haifa International Film Festival in October 2008.
