= Alois Hotschnig =

Austrian writer (born 1959)

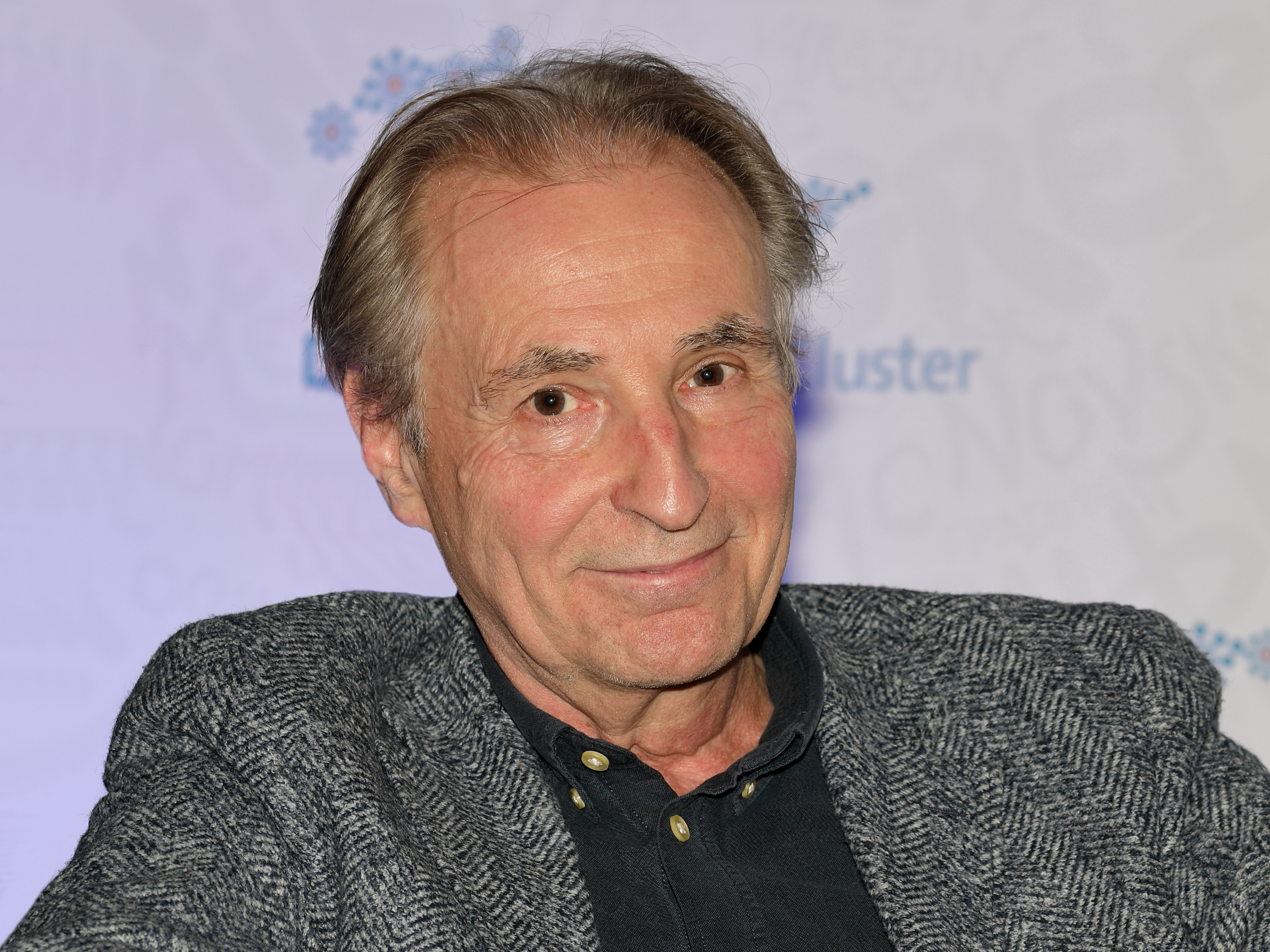
- Alois Hotschnig at the Vienna Book Fair 2025
- Born: 3 October 1959 (age 66); Berg im Drautal, Carinthia, Austria
- Occupation: Writer
- Writing career
- Genre: Fiction
- Notable work: Leonardo's Hands

Alois Hotschnig (born 3 October 1959) is an Austrian writer, whose stories have been described as having "the weird, creepy, and ambiguous quality of disturbing dreams". He first studied medicine, then German and English in Innsbruck. He was winner of the Erich Fried Prize in 2008, the Anton Wildgans Prize in 2009, and shortlisted for the Jan Michalski Prize for Literature in 2010. He lives as a freelance author in Innsbruck.

== Works ==
- Aus (in German). Frankfurt: Luchterhand Literaturverlag. 1989. ISBN 978-3-63086-692-5.
- Eine Art Glück (in German). Frankfurt: Luchterhand Literaturverlag. 1990. ISBN 978-3-85218-935-2.
- Leonardos Hände (in German). Hamburg: Luchterhand Literaturverlag. 1992. ISBN 978-3-63086-794-6.
- Absolution (in German). Köln: Kiepenheuer & Witsch. 1994. ISBN 978-3-46202-358-9.
- Leonardo's Hands. Translated by Peter Filkins. Lincoln: University of Nebraska Press. 1999. ISBN 978-0-80322-387-5.
- Ludwigs Zimmer (in German). Köln: Kiepenheuer & Witsch. 2000. ISBN 978-3-44272-898-5.
- Die Kinder beruhigte das nicht (in German). Köln: Kiepenheuer & Witsch. 2006. ISBN 978-3-46203-685-5.
- In Sitzen läuft es sich besser davon (in German). Köln: Kiepenheuer & Witsch. 2009. ISBN 978-3-46204-137-8.
- Midi, soir et matin (in French). Maren Sell. 2009. ISBN 978-2-35580-082-5.
- Maybe This Time. Translated by Tess Lewis. London: Peirene Press. 2011. ISBN 978-0-95628-405-1.
- Ludwig's Room. Translated by Tess Lewis. Chicago: Seagull Books. 2014. ISBN 978-0-85742-204-0.
