= Michael Köhlmeier =

Austrian writer and musician

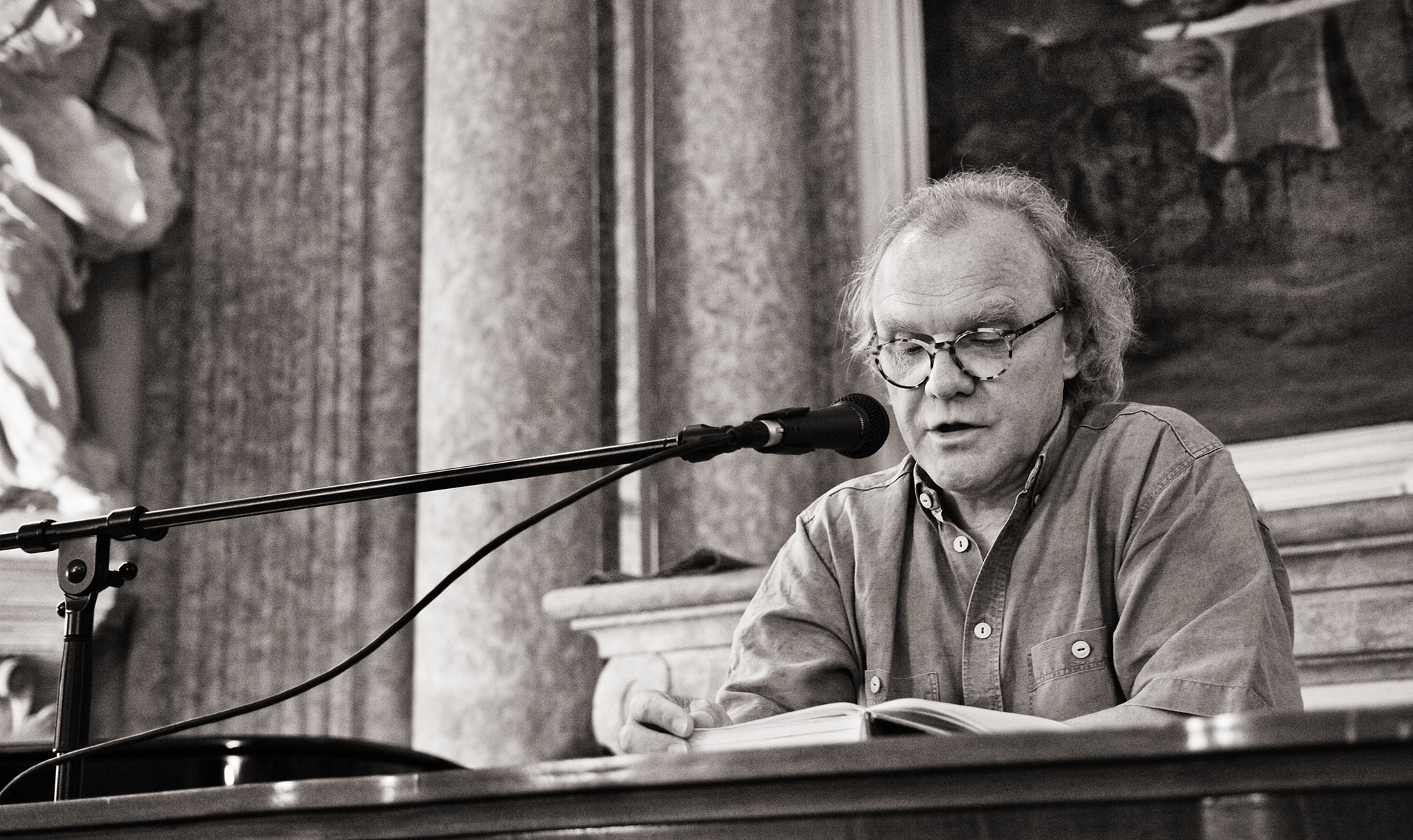
- Michael Köhlmeier in Olomouc
- Born: 15 October 1949 (age 77); Hard, Austria
- Education: University of Marburg
- Occupations: writer, musician
- Spouse: Monika Helfer (m. 1981)

Michael Köhlmeier (born 15 October 1949 in Hard, Austria) is a contemporary Austrian writer and musician.

He studied Politics and German (1970–1978) at the University of Marburg, Germany, and Mathematics and Philosophy at the universities in Giessen and Frankfurt, Germany. Recent acclaim hailed from his radio broadcasts of casually told antique myths (Telemachus and Calypso) and biblical stories (Moses), which were later issued as CDs and in book form.

Together with Reinhold Bilgeri he has composed cabaret programs and song lyrics, which both artists presented in public as the Duo Bilgeri & Köhlmeier. With the group Schellinski he has been writing song texts in Vorarlberg dialect since 2004.

In 1981 he married the writer Monika Helfer. Their daughter Paula Köhlmeier died in an accident in 2003, at the age of 21, and he dedicated his book Idylle mit ertrinkendem Hund (Idyll With Drowning Dog), ISBN 978-3-446-28643-6, as a memorial to her and his surviving family.

Other books include Abendland (Occident), Carl Hanser Verlag, August 2007, ISBN 978-3-446-20913-8, about the memoirs of a mathematics professor, telling the history of two families over the past 95 years. It has met with critical acclaim.

In 2025 his latest novel Die Verdorbenen (The Corrupted), ISBN 978-3-446-28250-6, was placed on the longlist of the German Book Prize.

Michael Köhlmeier lives as a free-lance writer in Hohenems, Vorarlberg.

== Awards ==
- Johann Peter Hebel Prize (1988)
- Manès Sperber Prize for Literature (1994)
- Grimmelshausen Prize (1997)
- Golden Badge of Honour for Meritorious Service of Vienna (2007)
- Prize Acknowledging Literary Achievements (2008)
- Max Frisch Prize (2026)
