= Incest (novel) =

1999 novel by Christine Angot

- 2017 English edition
- Author: Christine Angot
- Original title: L'inceste
- Translator: Tess Lewis
- Language: French
- Publisher: Stock, Steerforth Press
- Publication date: 1999
- Publication place: France
- English publication date: 2017
- Media type: Print, e-book
- ISBN: 2234051487 First edition, French
- OCLC: 43845765

Incest (French: L'inceste) is a 1999 autofiction novel by French author Christine Angot. It was translated into English by Tess Lewis in 2017. The story follows an anxious, depressed woman named Christine as she works through emotional turmoil following the end of her relationship with her lover and first lesbian partner Marie-Christine. Christine conveys her thoughts in a very disconnected manner as she discusses with readers the complicated relationships with her ex-lover, her ex-husband, her young daughter, and her father, who instigated an incestuous relationship with Christine when she was a teenager.

== Plot summary ==
The novel begins shortly after the end of Christine and Marie-Christine's three-month long sapphic affair. In the first and longest section of the book, entitled "No Man's Land," Christine reacts to the demise of her relationship with Marie-Christine and examines the other relationships in her life, including her relationship with her daughter Léonore and her ex-husband Claude.

The next section entitled "Christmas" is divided into several subsections. It begins by detailing the events that occurred between December 25 and 27, ending with a physical altercation between Christine and Marie-Christine and their separation. Christine then defines several words she identifies with, including incest, mental illness, paranoia, narcissism, homosexuality, subject, suicide, perversion, sadomasochism, nazism, hysteria, desire, and schizophrenia, respectively. She follows these definitions with examples of how these words apply to her life, and descriptions of her interactions with other individuals in her life in an effort to understand these words and how they apply to her specifically, as well as flashbacks to her and Marie-Christine's relationship in early December. This section ends with Christine describing a trip to the cinema that she took with her daughter, Léonore. In the final and shortest section of the novel, "Valda Candy", Christine describes in detail her incestuous relationship with her father, beginning when she was 14 and ending when she was 16. She then describes her relationship with 30-year-old Marc, a friend of her mother's, that began shortly after the end of her physical relationship with her father. Christine's focus then shifts back to her relationship with her father. Christine ends the novel by revealing that at age 26, she had resumed the incestuous relationship with her father.

== Character list ==
- Christine
  - The narrator of the novel.
- Marie-Christine
  - Christine's former lover.
- Nadine
  - A mutual friend of Christine and Marie-Christine.
- Léonore
  - Christine and Claude's 6-year-old daughter.
- Claude
  - Léonore's father and Christine's ex-husband.
- Pierre
  - Christine's father and the instigator of the past incestuous relationship.
- Marc
  - Christine's 30 year old lover whom she was with at age 16.

== Themes ==
=== Power dynamics ===
Angot often describes in her novels the incestuous relationship she had with her father, beginning when she was a teenager and lasting into her late twenties. This relationship exists in many conflicting circumstances, such as "domination and compliance, coercion and consensuality, fascination and fear, and abuse and mutual pleasure." Angot uses her position as an author to bring an intimate topic not often discussed, incest, into the public sphere. The public arena that Angot targets both suppresses and exhibits the private relationship Christine was involved in. By creating this contradictory environment in her novels, Angot seeks to create a metaphor for power dynamics in many facets of society.

== Writing style ==
Angot writes using short, fragmented sentences in her writing to create an environment of unreliability. By using contradictory phrases and unresolved paths of thought, Angot replicates the thoughts of a superficially conscious individual, and expects the readers to piece together the disconnected thoughts.

Angot also uses a style of writing known as autofiction, where the author and the protagonist share the same name and occasionally the same experiences. Angot has repeatedly described how her writing echoes her life, but she also has described the character Christine as her own entity whose identity shifts within the various novels she is featured in. Angot insists that you must be yourself when writing, but also allows her character to have its own freedom to shape its identity within the circumstances of its novel.

== Translation ==
Incest, the English translation of L'inceste, was published in 2017 by Tess Lewis. Lewis follows Angot's writing style closely, and precisely emulates the short, at times incoherent, sentences and phrases Angot uses in her writing. Lewis' translation was nominated for the Best Translated Book Award in 2018.

== Critical reception ==
Angot received criticism for the close resemblance between her characters and those related to her, creating a debate regarding the role of fiction in regards to public action, as well as the responsibility of an author to control the implications created by their works. Angot was sued in 2013 by Elise Bidoit for defamation of her character in Angot's novel Les Petits, and Bidoit won the lawsuit.

=== Awards ===
Incest was a finalist for the 2018 Albertine Prize, and was also nominated for the Best Translated Book Award in 2018 at the Best Translated Book Awards (BTBAs).
