= Maja Haderlap =

Slovenian-German Austrian writer

- Maja Haderlap (2026)
- Born: 8 March 1961 (age 65); Eisenkappel-Vellach (Slovene: Železna Kapla-Bela), Carinthia
- Education: University of Vienna, Austria
- Occupations: Novelist, Poet
- Writing career
- Period: 1983 to present
- Genres: Novel, Poetry
- Notable work: Angel of Oblivion

Maja Haderlap (born 8 March 1961 in Eisenkappel-Vellach (Slovene: Železna Kapla-Bela, Carinthia)) is a bilingual Slovenian-German Austrian writer, best known for her multiple-award-winning novel, Angel of Oblivion, about the Slovene ethnic minority's transgenerational trauma of being treated as 'homeland traitors' by the German-speaking Austrian neighbors, because they were the only ever-existing military resistance against National Socialism in Austria.

== Life ==
Her grandmother who was sent to Ravensbrück concentration camp. At ten years old, Haderlap's father was tortured by the Nazis to disclose where his father, who joined Slovene Partisans, was hiding. Her father often wanted to kill himself because of the way Austrian majority treated him. The family waited until he passed out, then pried his fingers from the gun. After reading her grandmother's diary, she was “afraid of being overrun by the past, of being crushed by its weight.” She made a conscious decision to write about her family's history in a novel.

== Work ==
She holds a PhD in Theatre Studies from University of Vienna and has worked at the Alpen-Adria-Universität in Klagenfurt. She was editor for many years of the Carinthian Slovene minority literary magazine 'Mladje' and wrote poetry, prose, and essays in both Slovenian and German. Her work has been published in numerous German and international literary journals and anthologies. From 1992 to 2007, she worked as dramaturge at the Klagenfurt City Theatre. She is the most awarded member of the Graz's Guild of writers and lives in Klagenfurt.

=== Angel of Oblivion ===
Winning one of the most important awards for literature in the German language, the Ingeborg Bachmann Prize in 2011, and the Max Frisch Prize of the City of Zurich in 2018, her most notable novel was made into a drama and put on theater stages. The story is told from a point of view of a young girl, growing up in the late-1960s or early-1970s in the Austrian province of Carinthia, learning to navigate the terrain between Slovenian, a language of the past anti-Nazi resistance and present humiliation, and German, an escape from being treated as traitor by her German-speaking Austrian neighbors.

== Books ==
- Žalik pesmi, Poems (1983)
- Bajalice, Poems (1987)
- Poems - Pesmi - Poems (1989)
- Deček in sonce (The boy and the sun), zadruga Novi Matajur, Cividale and Klagenfurt, Carinthia, Založba Drava (2000) ISBN 3-85435-330-8
- Between Politics and Culture
- The City of Klagenfurt Theatre from 1992 to 2007. The era Dietmar Pflegerl, Wieser, Klagenfurt (2007) ISBN 978-3-85129-696-9
- Engel des Vergessens (Angel of Oblivion), Wallstein, Göttingen (2011) ISBN 978-3-8353-0953-1

== Awards ==
- 2018: Max Frisch Prize of the City of Zurich
- 2017: PEN Translation Prize for Angel of Oblivion, translated by Tess Lewis in 2016
- 2012: Honorary Doctor, University of Klagenfurt
- 2012: Writer in residence in one world foundation in Sri Lanka
- 2011: Ingeborg Bachmann Prize for the novel "Angel of Oblivion"
- 2006/2007: Austrian State Scholarship for Literature
- 2005: Women's Culture Prize for Literature in the province of Carinthia
- 2004: Hubert Burda Prize as part of the Hermann-Lenz Prize
- 1989: Award of Prešeren Foundation
- 1983: Promotion Award of Carinthia
