= Hall Art Foundation =

Coordinates: 43.4520°N 72.5376°W

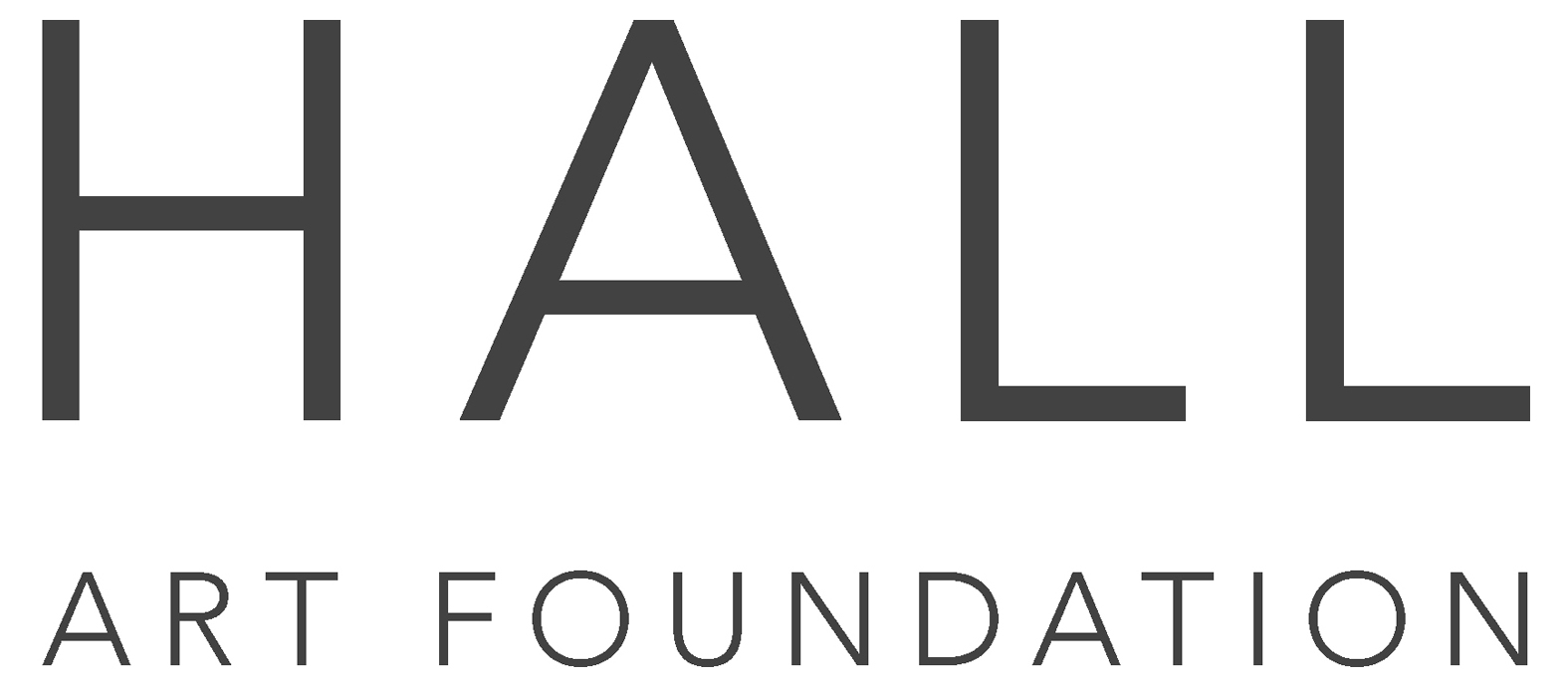
- Established: 2007
- Type: Art Museum
- Collections: Contemporary Art
- Collection size: 6,000 approx.
- Founders: Andrew Hall, Christine Hall
- Website: hallartfoundation.org

The Hall Art Foundation is an organization, founded in 2007 by Andrew Hall and Christine Hall, which oversees two contemporary art museums, one in Vermont and one in Germany, named Kunstmuseum Schloss Derneburg. There is also a permanent installation of Anselm Kiefer's work at MASS MoCA supported by the Hall Art Foundation. The museums in Vermont and Germany serve to exhibit some portion of Hall's 6,000-piece art collection. The Foundation and its efforts have been compared to Glenstone, another private museum.

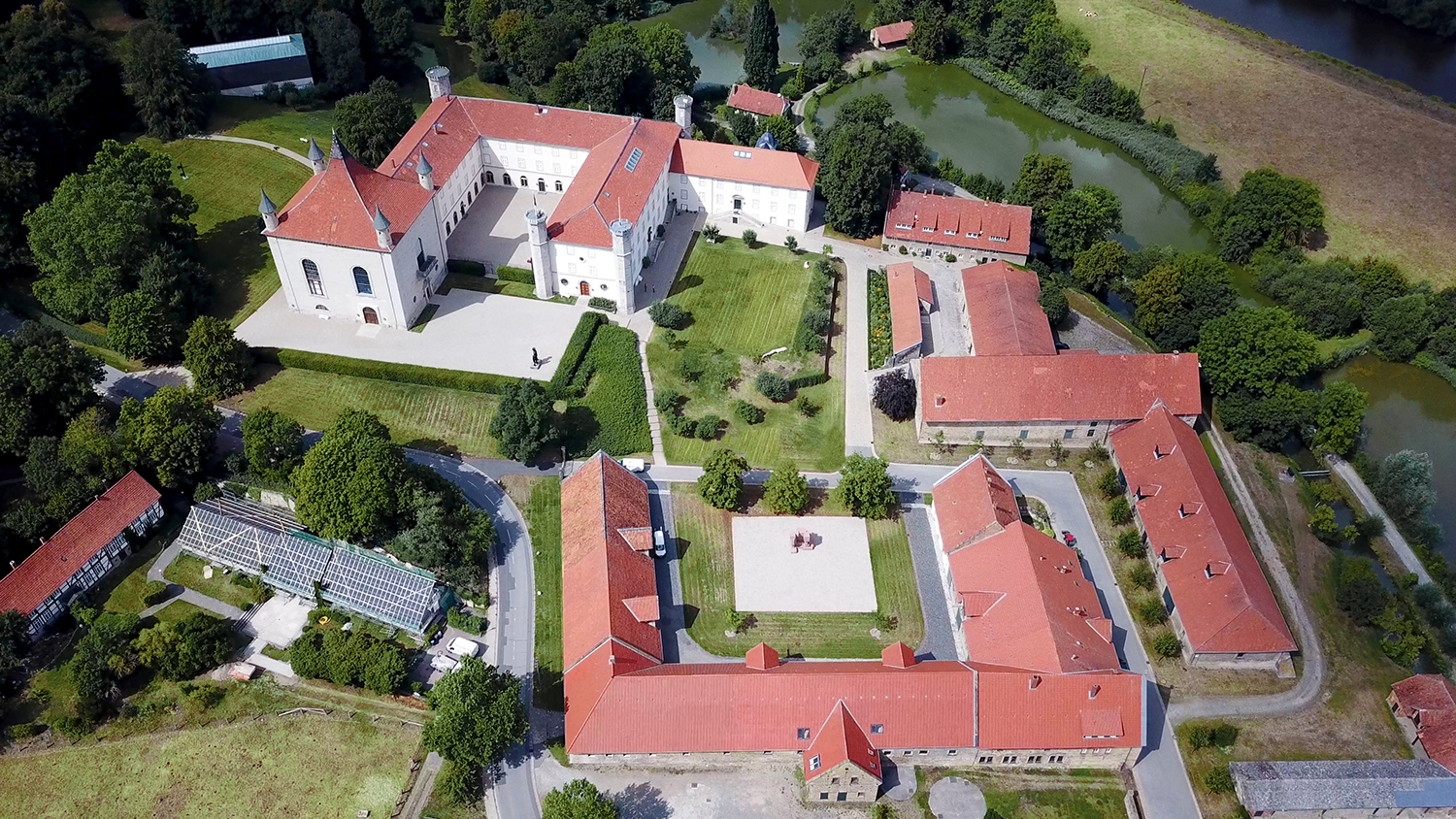
Aerial view of Kunstmuseum Schloss Derneburg. Photo: Stephan Hüsch

== Kunstmuseum Schloss Derneburg ==
Kunstmuseum Schloss Derneburg, situated in the municipality of Holle near Hannover, has a history that stretches back almost one thousand years. For centuries it was a convent and later a monastery. In the 19th Century it became the residence of the Dukes of Münster who commissioned the renowned Hanoverian architect Georg Ludwig Laves to convert it to a stately home. Artist Georg Baselitz acquired the property in the 1970s and it became his residence and studio for approximately thirty years until its sale in 2006. Since then, the Schloss has been reunited with the adjacent domain and both have undergone extensive renovations to become one of the largest privately owned public museums for contemporary art in Europe.

== Reading, Vermont ==
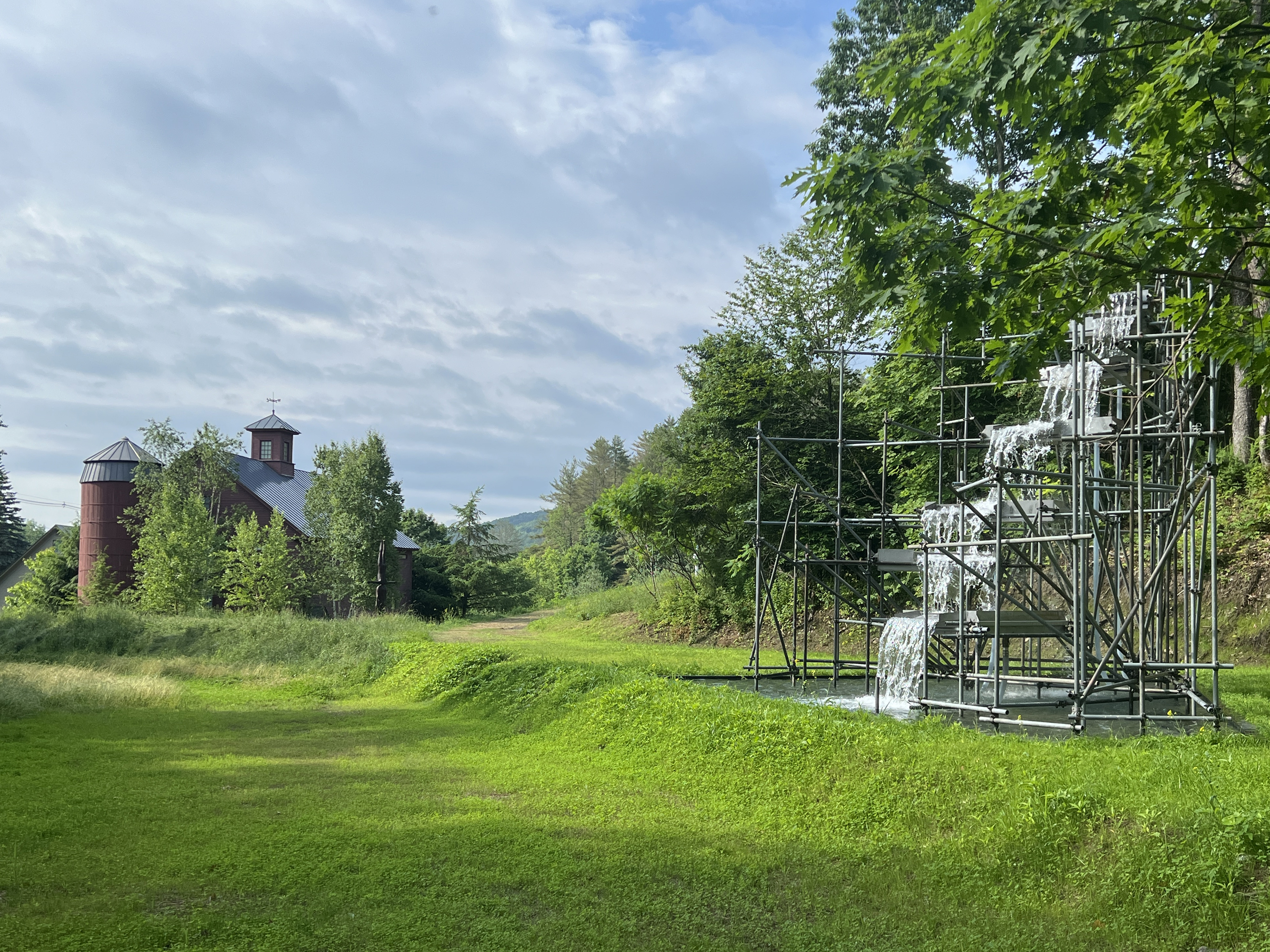
Hall Art Foundation, Reading, Vermont

Hall Art Foundation in Reading, Vermont is situated on a former dairy farm. The campus of converted galleries consists of a 19th-century stone farmhouse, three barns, as well as a reception center and cafe. Making up approximately 6,000 sq. feet of museum-quality exhibition space, the farmhouse and barns sit next to a waterfall on a tributary of the Black River, and are surrounded by approximately 400 acres of pastures, hayfields and extensive woodland. Outdoor sculptures by world-renown artists are installed throughout the grounds. Exhibitions are held seasonally, from May through November. In 2013, it was named by Architectural Digest as one of the "Must-See Museums Opened by Collectors Around the World".

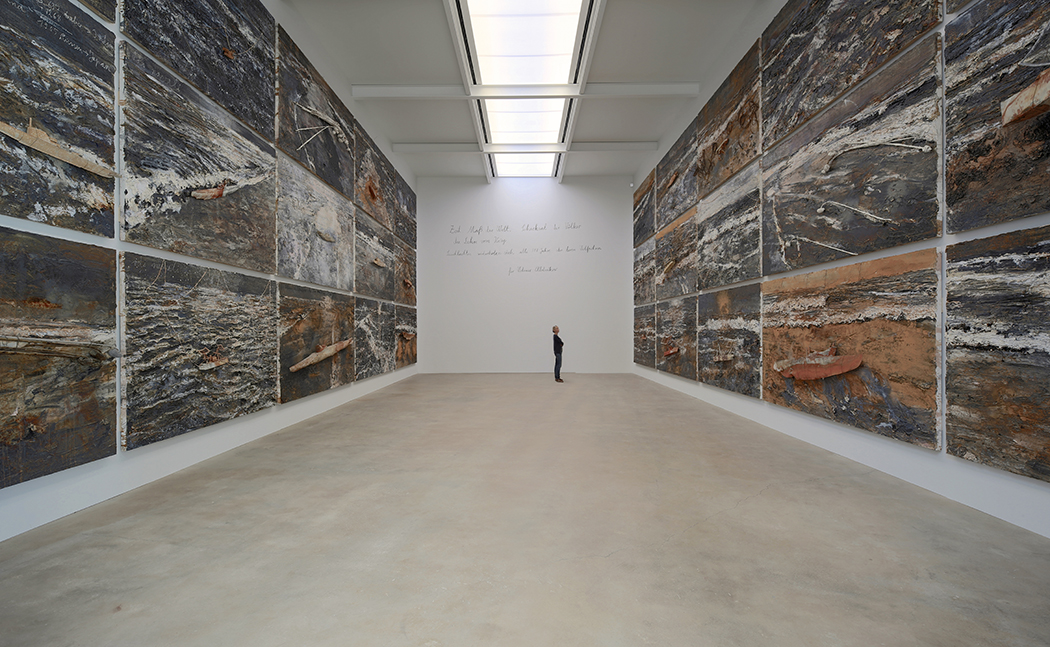
Partial view of Anselm Kiefer installation at Hall Art Foundation at MASS MoCA. Photo: Arthur Evans

== MASS MoCA ==
The Hall Art Foundation also has an exhibition partnership with the Massachusetts Museum of Contemporary Art, in North Adams, Massachusetts, the largest contemporary art museum in North America. In September 2013, the Foundation opened a long-term installation of sculpture and paintings by Anselm Kiefer in a specifically repurposed, 10,000 square-foot building on the MASS MoCA campus. In 2014, the Foundation landscaped the area surrounding this building in order to present long-term installations of outdoor sculpture.

== Collection ==
Together, the Hall and Hall Art Foundation collections comprise over 6,000 works by several hundred artists including Georg Baselitz, Joseph Beuys, Nicole Eisenman, Olafur Eliasson, Eric Fischl, Anselm Kiefer, Barbara Kruger, Ed Ruscha, Julian Schnabel, Andy Warhol and Franz West.

In addition to displaying its collection at its own two museum sites, the Hall Art Foundation collaborates with other public institutions around the world to organize exhibitions and facilitate loans from its own collection and that of the Halls.

As part of its educational activities, the Hall Art Foundation has published, co-published and/or provided substantial financial support for the publication of about two dozen books relating to the exhibitions it has organized and co-organized.

== Dreyfoos School of the Arts ==
In 2020, the Hall Art Foundation partnered with the Alexander W. Dreyfoos School of the Arts in West Palm Beach, Florida, a tuition-free magnet public high school for Palm Beach County's most talented and disciplined students in the arts. The Hall Art Foundation has established an endowment of over $1.5 million to provide merit-based scholarships to low-income students graduating from Dreyfoos who wish to pursue a degree in the Visual or Performing Arts at an accredited college, university or conservatory or who wish to attend an accredited summer arts program.
