= Ida Fink =

Polish-born Israeli author (1921 – 2011)

- אידה פינק
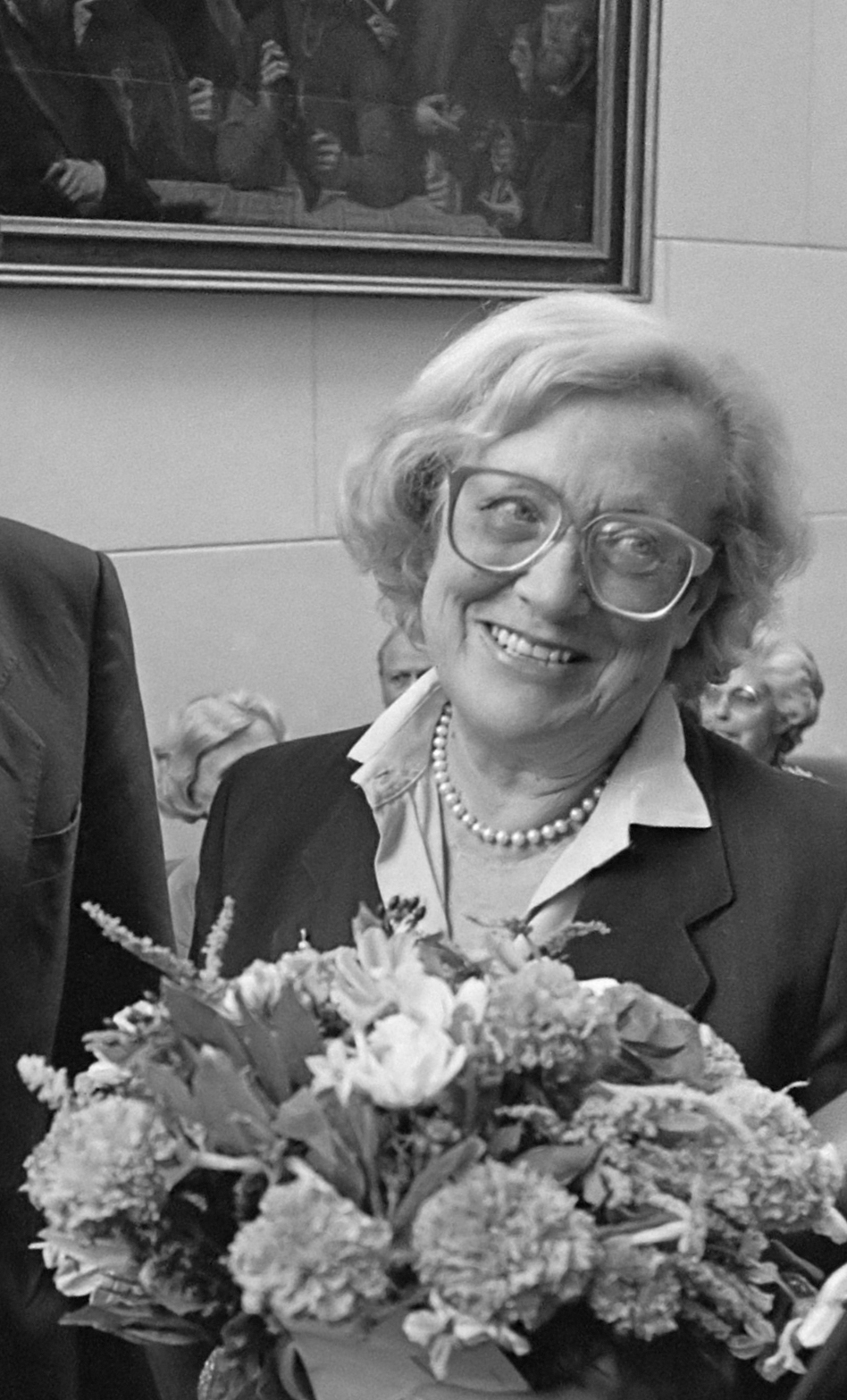
- Ida Fink in 1985
- Born: Ida Landau; 1 November 1921; Zbaraż, Poland (now Zbarazh, Ukraine)
- Died: 27 September 2011 (aged 89); Ramat Aviv, Israel
- Occupation: Author
- Known for: Writing about the Holocaust in Polish
- Awards: Anne Frank Prize (1985); Israel Prize for Literature (2008); Sapir Prize; Buchman Prize

Ida Fink (Hebrew: אידה פינק; 1 November 1921 – 27 September 2011) was a Polish-born Israeli author who wrote about the Holocaust in Polish. Winner of the Israel Prize for Fiction in 2008.

== Biography ==
Ida Fink was born as Ida Landau in Zbaraż, Poland (now Zbarazh, Ukraine) on 1 November 1921 to a Polish-Jewish family. Her father, Ludwig Landau, was a physician and her mother, Fannie Landau, worked as a teacher in a local school. She was a student of music at the Lwów Conservatory, and from the age of 16, she had made up her mind to become a writer, but her studies were halted by the German invasion of Poland in 1939. Landau and her family spent 1941–1942 in the Zbaraż ghetto, before escaping, along with her sister, with the help of Aryan papers. and until the end of the war, she fled from one refuge to another, working on German farms. During those two years her mother also died of cancer. She wrote about her experiences during the escape with her sister, using Aryan documents, in her book: "We Walk at Night, We Sleep in the Daylights" (1993). After the Holocaust, Landau married Bruno Fink, an engineer, and had a daughter, Miri Fink. In 1957, Fink and her family immigrated to Israel. They settled in Holon, where she worked as a music librarian and an interviewer for Yad Vashem, collecting testimonies. In 1958, she began publishing short stories in Polish-language press. In her final years, she resided in Ramat Aviv, a neighbourhood of Tel Aviv.

In 1985, Fink won the International Anne Frank Prize for Literature in the Netherlands; in 1995, she won the Yad Vashem Jacob Buchman Memorial Prize; in 1996, she was awarded the title of Darling of the City of Holon; in 2007, she won the Sapir Prize for Translated Literature.

In 2008, Ida Fink won the Israel Prize for Literature, in the field of Fiction.

In 2008, the film Spring 1941 was produced, directed by Uri Barbash, based on two of her stories.

Ida Fink died at the age of 89. She was buried in the Kiryat Shaul Cemetery in Tel Aviv.

Her archive is in the Archives Department of the National Library in Jerusalem.

== Literary career ==
Although Fink was an Israeli writer, her books were originally written in her childhood language: Polish, and were later translated into Hebrew. Her books deal with the life and trauma of the Holocaust, which she experienced in her youth, and the hardships of Holocaust survivors after the war.

Fink began writing in Poland after the end of the war, and continued her work after immigrating to Israel. She focused on episodes in the fate of individuals, their personal relationships, and their daily struggle for survival and their hardships during the Holocaust. According to her, she had the impression, after immigrating to Israel, that there was little interest in the subject and that there was a lack of information and background. It was only with the Eichmann trial that the Israeli audience was exposed to the direct stories of Holocaust refugees. Until then, the subject had been too abstract in their minds.

Fink's goal was not to document history, but to immortalize the individual, the personal story of the little people, who were not meant to be heroes. That is why she did not often mention the names of places in her stories. She was wary of generalizations and moral judgments of her heroes from any side and lets the situations and conversations tell their own story.

The short stories sometimes spanned a long period, and sometimes a half-hour. The narrators were also varied, sometimes a man, sometimes a woman, sometimes in the first person, sometimes in the third person, and sometimes it was a chorus of voices. Fink rarely touched directly on the physical horrors. The emphasis was more on the mental impression of the abuses and torments: feelings of horror, astonishment, wonder at a world that had deviated from its course, reflections on human nature, and sometimes even a sensitivity to beauty. Fink's language was concise, clear, measured, and avoiding any shouting or pathos.

Her short stories appeared twice on the Polish Matriculation Exam, Matura.

== Films ==
A documentary about Ida Fink, The Garden that Floated Away, was produced by Israeli filmmaker Ruth Walk.

The film Das letzte Versteck (2002) was based on her book The Journey.

The 2008 film Spring 1941, directed by Uri Barbash, was based on her book Wiosna 1941.

== Awards ==
In 2008, Fink was awarded the Israel Prize, for literature.

She has also won the Anne Frank Prize (1985), the Buchman Prize and the Sapir Prize.

== Published work ==
- The Key Game (1986)
- A Scrap of Time and Other Stories (1987)
- The Journey (1990)
- Traces (1996)

== See also ==
- List of Israel Prize recipients
