= Andrew Hall (hedge fund manager) =

English hedge fund manager

- Born: Andrew John Hall; Bristol
- Education: Hampton Grammar School, Oxford University
- Occupation: Hedge fund manager

Andrew John Hall (born 1950) is a British commodities trader, hedge fund manager, and art patron. He was chief executive of Phibro Energy, the energy trading division of Citigroup, for more than two decades, and founded Astenbeck Capital Management, an independent commodities hedge fund that at its peak managed more than $3 billion in assets. In 2019, the Financial Times described him as the "most successful oil trader of his generation." Hall is also known as a significant collector of postwar and contemporary art, and co-founded the Hall Art Foundation, which operated museum spaces in Vermont and Germany.

== Early life and education ==
Hall was born in Bristol and raised in Feltham, in what was then the county of Middlesex. He was educated at Hampton Grammar School (now Hampton School), a selective independent school in the London Borough of Richmond upon Thames. He went on to read chemistry at the University of Oxford, graduating with a Master of Arts degree in 1973, and later completed an MBA at INSEAD, the international business school at Fontainebleau, France.

== Career ==
BP (1973–1982)

Upon graduating from Oxford in 1973, Hall joined BP where he worked in various roles over nearly a decade. He rose to the position of Vice President of BP North America Trading, based in New York City.

Phibro (1982–2009)

Hall left BP in 1982 to join Phibro Energy, one of the world's largest physical commodities trading firms. After taking charge of Phibro’s energy unit in 1988, he led a strategic transformation of the business that positioned the firm at the forefront of the rapidly developing energy derivatives market. He joined the board of directors of Salomon Inc., Phibro's parent company, in 1991, and became chief executive of Phibro the same year.

Through a succession of corporate transactions, Phibro eventually became a subsidiary of Citigroup. Under Hall's leadership the trading operation generated substantial profits, most famously in 2008, when Hall reportedly earned approximately $100 million in compensation — a figure that attracted intense public and political scrutiny in the wake of the financial crisis and the United States government's bailout of Citigroup. The controversy over his pay became a flashpoint in wider debates about Wall Street compensation, with the Obama administration's 'pay tsar', Kenneth Feinberg, examining whether the contractual bonus could be reduced. In 2009, Citigroup sold Phibro to Occidental Petroleum for approximately $370 million. The transaction was driven in significant part by the difficulties created by Hall's compensation arrangements at a bank that had received taxpayer support.

Astenbeck Capital Management (2008–2017)

While still at Citigroup, Hall launched Astenbeck Capital Management in 2008, an independent hedge fund focused on commodities. The fund grew rapidly, raising more than $3 billion in assets under management and establishing itself as one of the most closely watched energy trading operations on Wall Street. Hall was known for his willingness to take large, long-term directional positions in crude oil based on macro theses — a contrarian approach that produced exceptional returns in some years and significant losses in others.

Astenbeck's strategy was tested severely by the structural transformation of the global oil market following the shale revolution in the United States, which challenged Hall's long-held thesis that declining conventional oil reserves would drive sustained price appreciation. After a period of under-performance as oil prices remained depressed, Hall announced in August 2017 that he was closing Astenbeck's main fund.

== Art collecting and the Hall Art Foundation ==
In 2007, Andrew and Christine Hall founded the Hall Art Foundation, a nonprofit organization whose mission is to make postwar and contemporary works from their collection available to the public for both enjoyment and education. The Foundation operates two principal museum venues: one in Reading, Vermont, and one at Schloss Derneburg, a historic castle complex near Hildesheim in Lower Saxony, Germany.

The Foundation holds an ongoing partnership with the Massachusetts Museum of Contemporary Art (MASS MoCA) in North Adams, Massachusetts.

In 2026, Andrew and Christine Hall were awarded the Große Verdienstkreuz des Niedersächsischen Verdienstordens — the Grand Cross of the Order of Merit of Lower Saxony — in recognition of their outstanding contributions to art and culture in the region. The award cited their efforts to promote contemporary art, the establishment of the Hall Art Foundation, and the restoration and preservation of Schloss Derneburg and its conversion into a public museum space.
