= Donkeys 92–97 =

Compilation album by Tindersticks
- Released: 24 August 1998
- Label: Island
- Producers: Tindersticks, Ian Caple

Tindersticks chronology
Curtains (1997)	Donkeys 92–97 (1998)	Simple Pleasure (1999)

Professional ratings
Review scores
Source	Rating
Allmusic	3.5/5 stars
NME	8/10

Donkeys 92–97 is a compilation album by the British alternative band Tindersticks, released in August 1998. The album is a collection of singles, B-sides, rarities, and unreleased recordings. The band had signed to the major label Island Records after their previous independent label, This Way Up, had folded, and Donkeys 92–97 was intended to be an introduction by Island for new listeners. The vinyl version of the album was limited to 5,000 copies and contained an extra track, "Feeling Relatively Good".

== Track listing ==
All tracks are written by Tindersticks except where indicated.

No.	Title	Track information	Length
1.	"Patchwork"	Single, November 1992	4:41
2.	"Marbles"	Single, February 1993	4:38
3.	"Her"	Original version, 1993	2:52
4.	"City Sickness"	Single, September 1993	4:02
5.	"Travelling Light"	Single, August 1995	4:43
6.	"I've Been Loving You Too Long" (Otis Redding/Jerry Butler)	B-side of "Travelling Light", August 1995	5:07
7.	"Plus de Liaisons"	French version of "No More Affairs", free 7" single with vinyl copies of 2nd album Tindersticks, April 1995	3:53
8.	"Here" (Stephen Malkmus/Scott Kannberg)	7" single for the Sub Pop Singles Club, June 1995	4:25
9.	"Tiny Tears"	From the Nénette et Boni soundtrack, October 1996	5:28
10.	"Bathtime"	Single, May 1997	3:56
11.	"A Marriage Made in Heaven"	Orchestral version featuring Isabella Rossellini, 1997	5:17
12.	"For Those..."	Orchestral version, 1997	4:58

=== Vinyl LP bonus track ===
No.	Title	Track information	Length
13.	"Feeling Relatively Good"	7" single for the Domino Singles Club, July 1993	3:32
