= Across Six Leap Years =

Studio album by Tindersticks
- Released: 14 October 2013
- Recorded: 6–12 April and 13 May 2013
- Studios: Abbey Road Studios, London
- Length: 51:07
- Label: Lucky Dog/City Slang
- Producer: Stuart A. Staples

Tindersticks chronology
| The Something Rain (2012) | Across Six Leap Years (2013) | The Waiting Room (2016) |

Across Six Leap Years is the tenth studio album by English alternative band Tindersticks, released on 14 October 2013. The album consists of ten previously released songs from the band's and singer Stuart Staples' solo back catalogue, which were re-recorded at Abbey Road Studios. The title refers to the fact that there had been six leap years (from 1992 to 2012) during the 21 years that Tindersticks had been together up to the recording of this album, and hinted that the record was something of a retrospective interpretation of their career.

== Musical content ==
David Boulter and Stuart Staples stated on Tindersticks' website that the songs included on Across Six Leap Years were ones they felt had not been recorded originally in the manner that the band had wanted, or that they had been "lost"—"Friday Night" and "Marseilles Sunshine" were originally written for a new Tindersticks album following Waiting for the Moon, before ending up on Staples' debut solo album in simpler forms after the original line-up of the group broke up, while "What Are You Fighting For?" was intended to be the closing track on The Hungry Saw but was not completed in time.

== Critical reception ==
Professional ratings
Aggregate scores
| Source | Rating |
|---|---|
| Metacritic | 68/100 |
Review scores
| Source | Rating |
| AllMusic | 3/5 stars |
| Mojo | 4/5 stars |
| NME | 7/10 |
| Pitchfork | 7.4/10.0 |
| Record Collector | 3/5 stars |
| Time Out London | 3/5 stars |
| Uncut | 2.5/5 stars |

Reviews for Across Six Leap Years were mixed, with several reviewers questioning the necessity of re-recording some of the songs in a manner so similar to the originals. At Metacritic, which assigns a weighted average score out of 100 to reviews and ratings from mainstream critics, the album has received a metascore of 68, based on 7 reviews.

Uncut described the album as "a slightly pointless retrospective" while AllMusic said that many of the songs "remain so close to the original arrangements they merely retread the floorboards with slightly more polish and greater fidelity... There isn't anything inherently 'wrong' with the music on Across Six Leap Years [but] this feels more like a shoulder shrug than an anniversary celebration". NME observed that "the 'improvements' here are virtually imperceptible for those of us unconcerned with rim-tap reverb. You suspect Stuart Staples wanted to re-sing 'A Night In' while simply smoking a better brand of French cigarette, but Across... is nonetheless a very fond retread around the outskirts of a dank, delectable career." Mojo described the album as "unreservedly recommended, but for the uninitiated and obsessives only", while Pitchfork Media offered the opinion that "these songs don't stray far from the original pieces, instead working as tasteful updates that add a dab of cohesion that was never needed in the first place." Record Collector stated that "many of these reworks are so slightly different as to possibly only truly satisfy the [fans], but no matter. A great song is a great song is a great song."

== Track listing ==
| No. | Title | Writer(s) | Original version appeared on | Length |
|---|---|---|---|---|
| 1. | "Friday Night" | Stuart Staples | Lucky Dog Recordings 03–04 | 5:30 |
| 2. | "Marseilles Sunshine" | Staples | Lucky Dog Recordings 03–04 | 4:31 |
| 3. | "She's Gone" | David Boulter, Mark Colwill, Neil Fraser, James Richard Hinchliffe, Alistair Macaulay, Staples | Tindersticks (1995 album) | 3:44 |
| 4. | "Dying Slowly" | Boulter, Hinchliffe, Staples | Can Our Love... | 4:28 |
| 5. | "If You're Looking for a Way Out" | Sandy Linzer | Simple Pleasure | 4:42 |
| 6. | "Say Goodbye to the City" | Boulter, Colwill, Fraser, Hinchliffe, Macaulay, Staples | Waiting for the Moon | 4:42 |
| 7. | "Sleepy Song" | Boulter, Colwill, Fraser, Hinchliffe, Macaulay, Staples | Tindersticks (1995 album) | 4:40 |
| 8. | "A Night In" | Boulter, Colwill, Fraser, Hinchliffe, Macaulay, Staples | Tindersticks (1995 album) | 6:54 |
| 9. | "I Know That Loving" | Boulter, Hinchliffe, Macaulay, Staples | Simple Pleasure | 6:46 |
| 10. | "What Are You Fighting For?" | Staples | 2008 tour-only 7" single | 4:10 |

== Personnel ==
Tindersticks

- David Boulter – piano, Hammond organ, Fender Rhodes electric piano, percussion
- Neil Fraser – electric guitar, acoustic guitar
- Earl Harvin – drums, backing vocals
- Dan McKinna – bass guitar, backing vocals
- Stuart A. Staples – vocals, electric guitar, acoustic guitar, percussion

Additional personnel

- Natalia Bonner – violin
- Harry Brown – trombone on "A Night In" and "I Know That Loving"
- Charlie Cross – viola
- Calina de la Mare – violin on "She's Gone"
- Alison Dods – violin
- Terry Edwards – trumpet on "Marseilles Sunshine", "Dying Slowly", "Say Goodbye to the City" and "Sleepy Song"; baritone saxophone on "Say Goodbye to the City"
- Gina Foster – backing vocals
- Howard Grott – violin
- Caroline Hall – trombone on "Dying Slowly"
- Rick Koster – violin
- Oliver Kraus – cello
- Andy Nice – tenor saxophone on "Say Goodbye to the City"; solo cello on "Sleepy Song"
- Louise Peacock – violin
- Rachel Robson – viola
- Julian Siegel – tenor saxophone on "A Night In" and "I Know That Loving"
- Julia Singleton – violin
- Sophie Sirota – viola
- Robert Spriggs – viola on "She's Gone"
- Byron Wallen – trumpet on "A Night In" and "I Know That Loving"
- Lucy Wilkins – violin on "She's Gone"
- Sarah Willson – cello on "She's Gone"
- Jason Yarde – baritone saxophone on "A Night In" and "I Know That Loving"
