= Tindersticks (disambiguation) =

Tindersticks is a British rock band. It is also the name of two eponymous albums by that band:

- Tindersticks (1993 album), the band's debut album
- Tindersticks (1995 album), the band's second album
