= Working for the Man (album) =

Compilation album by Tindersticks
- Released: 5 April 2004 (UK); 30 November 2004 (U.S.)
- Labels: Island (UK); Universal (U.S.)

Tindersticks chronology
Waiting for the Moon (2003)	Working for the Man (2004)	The Hungry Saw (2008)

Professional ratings
Review scores
Source	Rating
Allmusic	4/5 stars
BBC Music	ambivalent
NME	9/10
Pitchfork Media	7.4/10

Working for the Man is a compilation album by British band Tindersticks. It was released on Island Records in April 2004 in the UK, and on Island's parent company Universal in November 2004 in the U.S. The album covers the period from the band's first single in 1992 to 1999, when Tindersticks' contract with Island ended after the release of their fourth studio album Simple Pleasure. Working for the Man was released ahead of the reissue by Island of the group's first five albums in remastered and expanded versions.

The album's artwork is by artist Suzanne Osborne and the band's singer Stuart Staples.

== Track listing ==
All songs written and composed by Tindersticks, except where indicated.

1. "City Sickness" – 3:58
2. "Marbles" – 4:31
3. "Patchwork" – 4:41
4. "Her" (original version) – 2:52
5. "Travelling Light" – 4:40
6. "Tiny Tears" – 5:26
7. "Bathtime" – 3:56
8. "Another Night In" – 4:58
9. "Can We Start Again?" – 3:49
10. "I Know That Loving" – 5:45
11. "For Those..." (orchestral version) – 4:55

=== Bonus CD ===
Initial versions of the album came with a second bonus disc of hard to find or deleted tracks.

No.	Title	Track information	Length
1.	"Patchwork"	7" single version	4:41
2.	"Milky Teeth"	7" single version	3:08
3.	"Joe Stumble"	B-side of "Marbles"	4:36
4.	"For Those..."	single version, B-side of "Marbles"	4:50
5.	"Benn"	B-side of "Marbles"	1:17
6.	"Fruitless"	bonus track on vinyl version of first album Tindersticks	1:47
7.	"Untitled"	B-side of "City Sickness"	3:04
8.	"The Bullring"	B-side of "City Sickness"	2:08
9.	"Kathleen" (Townes Van Zandt)	single	5:42
10.	"Summat Moon"	B-side of "Kathleen"	3:29
11.	"A Sweet Sweet Man"	B-side of "Kathleen"	5:57
12.	"E Type Joe"	B-side of "Kathleen"	1:48
13.	"Plus de Liaisons"	French version of "No More Affairs", 7" single included with vinyl version of second album Tindersticks	3:51
14.	"Waiting 'Round You"	B-side of "Travelling Light"	2:56
15.	"I've Been Loving You Too Long" (Otis Redding/Jerry Butler)	B-side of "Travelling Light"	4:58
16.	"Here" (Stephen Malkmus/Scott Kannberg)	"The Smooth Sounds of Tindersticks" 7" single for the Sub Pop Singles Club	4:25
17.	"Harry's Dilemma"	"The Smooth Sounds of Tindersticks" 7" single for the Sub Pop Singles Club	5:55
