= The Hungry Saw =

Studio album by Tindersticks
- Released: 28 April 2008
- Recorded: June–August 2007
- Studios: Le Chien Chanceaux, France; Eastcote, London; Olympic, London
- Genre: Chamber pop
- Length: 45:23
- Label: Beggars Banquet
- Producer: Stuart A. Staples

Tindersticks chronology
Working for the Man (2004)	The Hungry Saw (2008)	Falling Down a Mountain (2010)

Singles from The Hungry Saw
- 1. "The Hungry Saw" Released: 14 April 2008; 2. "Boobar Come Back to Me" Released: 29 September 2008

The Hungry Saw is the seventh studio album by British alternative band Tindersticks, released on 28 April 2008 by Beggars Banquet Records. Following the release of the band's sixth album, Waiting for the Moon in 2003, Tindersticks had entered an extended hiatus before reconvening to perform at the Don't Look Back event in September 2006. This concert marked the final performance of the original line-up of the band, and three members left the group shortly afterwards. The remaining members of Tindersticks felt reinvigorated by the performance, and relocated to France to begin working on new material in the summer of 2007, recording and producing the album at their own Le Chien Chanceaux studio in Limousin. The Hungry Saw was the first new Tindersticks material in five years.

Two songs from the album, "The Hungry Saw" and "Boobar Come Back to Me", were released as singles. Critics noted that the album stayed close to the soul-influenced sound that Tindersticks had been exploring since their 1999 album Simple Pleasure, and praised the band for their consistency. The Hungry Saw was met with generally positive reviews.

== Background and recording ==
Musical differences had come to a head during the recording of Tindersticks' previous album Waiting for the Moon in 2003, and the band entered an extended hiatus. Island Records issued remastered and expanded versions of the band's first four studio albums and the Nénette et Boni soundtrack, along with a compilation album that documented Tindersticks' time with Island entitled Working for the Man, in 2004. Singer Stuart Staples started the Lucky Dog record label and released his debut solo album, Lucky Dog Recordings 03–04, in 2005 and the Leaving Songs album in 2006, while violinist Dickon Hinchcliffe recorded the score to the 2005 Ira Sachs film Forty Shades of Blue. The original six members of Tindersticks reconvened for one final time in September 2006 to play their second album Tindersticks in its entirety for the Don't Look Back series of concerts, after which three band members left the group.

The remaining three members, Staples, guitarist Neil Fraser, and multi-instrumentalist David Boulter, felt reinvigorated by the concert and were keen to continue as Tindersticks. In 2006 Staples and his family had relocated to Limousin in France, and during the first half of 2007 the band built their own studio, Le Chien Chanceaux, in a barn in his garden. Most of the recording for The Hungry Saw, the first new Tindersticks material in five years, took place over an eight-day period in June 2007 in the new studio. Dan McKinna and Thomas Belhom, who later became full-time members of the group, were recruited to play bass and drums respectively, and long-time collaborators Ian Caple, Terry Edwards, Lucy Wilkins and Calina de la Mare helped with the recording and the arrangements. Following further recording sessions at Eastcote Studios and Olympic Studios in London, the album was produced and mixed at Le Chien Chanceaux by Stuart Staples.

== Musical content ==
The Hungry Saw contains twelve tracks with a total running time of forty-six minutes. Critics noted that the music on the album was a continuation of the sound that Tindersticks had been exploring since 1999's soul-influenced Simple Pleasure, with PopMatters stating that "the revamped band sound(s) much like it has since 1999, when they gave up on grandiosity...the paired-down [sic] sound of The Hungry Saw is really nothing new." Reviews for The Hungry Saw described the album as containing "foreboding, compelling soul", and "blue-eyed/black-lung balladry with classic soul touches-- warm Hammond organ tones, tambourine-rattled rhythms, female back-up singers" that were "remarkably in tune with contemporary British pop music's neo-soul slant".

Tiny Mix Tapes described the album as "a quiet, subtle record", while the BBC noticed that the simple sound of the record resulted in a "stripped-bare, unfussy take on proceedings." PopMatters remarked that "ornamental instrumentation is used quite sparingly", while other critics noted the "smoky, solitary atmosphere and muted string arrangements" and "restrained" brass accompaniment. AllMusic said that Tindersticks "retain every last aspect of what made the band special (the inventive arrangements, the cinematic sweep of the songs, Stuart Staples' distinctive vocals)" and noted that "the arrangements...are given extra care", describing the horns as "superb" and remarking that "the strings sound rich and suitably dramatic on the heavy ballads and breezy on the light ones." Dusted magazine also commended the arrangements, remarking that they carried "poignant depth, cinematic sweep and enviable perfectionism", while Drowned in Sound described them as "immaculate".

The pace of The Hungry Saw's music was described by Uncut as "funereal", while Tiny Mix Tapes remarked upon the album's "low-down grooves" and "slow tempos". Magnet magazine stated that the band's "grand balladry is more stately and slow-boiled than ever", and Dusted described the album's ballads as "fragile", saying that they "linger like half-forgotten dreams, deeply romantic yet always tinged with regret." Pitchfork noted that "with their smoky, solitary atmosphere and muted string arrangements, "The Other Side of the World" and "All the Love" are textbook Tindersticks ballads". "All the Love" was also described as "typically downbeat", "lovely and harrowing" and "uncommonly spare, even for a T-sticks ballad", but it was mentioned that Suzanne Osbourne's backing vocals provided "a welcome touch of sunshine" to the track.

Despite the "heavily maudlin" sound of the album, "The Flicker of a Little Girl" was described as a "sprightly", "breezy piano-rolled folk lullaby" that "owes a debt to Lee Hazlewood." The influence of Hazlewood on the record was also noted by other critics. The "almost poppy" song "Boobar Come Back to Me", which employs a call and response vocal pattern, was described as "one of The Hungry Saw's undisputed highlights" that "suggests another solitary Staples serenade about lost love, before slowly blossoming into a wonderful Spectorized finale."

== Artwork and release ==
The album features artwork by Stuart Staples and his artist wife, Suzanne Osborne. The front cover is a photograph of a carving of heart and a saw, and the back cover photograph shows the album track listing, also carved. Staples had used a screwdriver to make the carvings into the wall of his kitchen at home in Limousin, "to make it stay there. To properly mark our new start."

Tindersticks announced The Hungry Saw in February 2008, with "The Flicker of a Little Girl" being made available as a free digital download from the band's Myspace page. Prior to the release of the album, title track "The Hungry Saw" was released as a single available as a digital download and on seven-inch vinyl. The Hungry Saw album was released on vinyl and CD formats on 28 April 2008 by Beggars Banquet Records in the UK & Europe, and the band played a series of live dates in Copenhagen, Brussels, London and Paris to promote the album's release.

A second single, "Boobar Come Back to Me", was released on seven-inch in September 2008 on the band's own Lucky Dog label, and The Hungry Saw received a North American release on 16 September 2008 by Constellation Records. After performing at some music festivals in the summer of 2008, more European dates followed in November and December, before Tindersticks undertook a tour of North America in February and March 2009.

== Reception ==
Professional ratings
Aggregate scores
Source	Rating
Metacritic	79/100
Review scores
Source	Rating
AllMusic	4/5 stars
The A.V. Club	A−
Drowned in Sound	7/10
The Observer	3/5 stars
Pitchfork	7.1/10.0
PopMatters	7/10 stars
Record Collector	4/5 stars
Spin	6/10
Tiny Mix Tapes	4/5 marks
Uncut	3/5 stars

The Hungry Saw was met with some critical acclaim. At Metacritic, which assigns a weighted average score out of 100 to reviews and ratings from mainstream critics, the album received a metascore of 79, based on 20 reviews, indicating "generally favourable reviews". In his review for AllMusic, Tim Sendra described the album as "classic Tindersticks", remarking that "the band retain every last aspect of what made [them] special", but also that the band managed to sound "rejuvenated and fresh at the same time". Reviewing The Hungry Saw for The A.V. Club, Vadim Rizov noted that while the "strings and brass remain constant" and "Tindersticks remains a champion at feel-bad soul strings," the music on the album was "pared down" and represented "a new sound". Drowned in Sound's Billy Hamilton offered the opinion that while "there's very little here that couldn't slot seamlessly into any of the group's output", The Hungry Saw was "something that can be unequivocally relied upon to produce the goods." This consistency was also noticed by Campbell Stevenson of The Observer, who opined that "it's an eternal 3am in their songs, and they haven't messed with the losers' formula."

Pitchfork writer Stuart Berman stated that "The Hungry Saw's temperate approach feels like the work of a band who are grateful for a new lease on life, but not sure exactly what to do with it," noting how "the record turns increasingly more restrained, as it reconciles the band's well-established soul affinities with a more pastoral presentation" while praising its "beautifully rendered" ballads. In his review for PopMatters, Michael Keefe opined that while "all of The Hungry Saw finds Tindersticks trekking through fairly familiar territory...they find new diversions along the way." Writing for Record Collector, Jake Kennedy said that "The Hungry Saw marks a wonderful coming of age for Tindersticks...this is the sound of pure rejuvenation." In a less complementary review, Shannon Zimmerman of Spin found that "the first half of Tindersticks' latest is a can't-miss proposition" but that "the disc's second half descends into a morass of half-finished, melancholic curios that mostly go nowhere slowly." Uncut critic Sam Richards was similarly unimpressed, offering that "Tindersticks have returned refreshed, but some of the old dissolute glamour is gone." This opinion was not shared by Tiny Mix Tapes, whose reviewing writer said that "ultimately, it's another Tindersticks record, and they're still good after all these years. It's not an incredibly remarkable record, but when a band is this consistent for this long, it's hard to fault it."

== Track listing ==
1. "Introduction" (David Boulter) – 3:32
2. "Yesterdays Tomorrows" (Boulter, Stuart Staples) – 3:49
3. "The Flicker of a Little Girl" (Staples) – 3:30
4. "Come Feel the Sun" (Boulter, Staples) – 2:28
5. "E-Type" (Boulter) – 2:54
6. "The Other Side of the World" (Staples) – 4:12
7. "The Organist Entertains" (Boulter) – 2:33
8. "The Hungry Saw" (Staples) – 3:46
9. "Mother Dear" (Staples) – 4:19
10. "Boobar Come Back to Me" (Staples) – 3:58
11. "All the Love" (Staples) – 4:53
12. "The Turns We Took" (Boulter, Staples) – 5:29

== Personnel ==
Credits are adapted from the album's liner notes.

Tindersticks

- David Boulter – pianos, organ, percussion and guitar
- Neil Fraser – electric and acoustic guitars
- Stuart A. Staples – vocals, acoustic guitar and percussion

Additional musicians

- Thomas Belhom – drums and percussion
- Terry Edwards – trumpet, saxophones and brass arrangements
- Joanne Fraser – flute
- Caroline Hall – trombone
- Sally Hibbert – violin
- Calina de la Mare – violin and string arrangements on "The Other Side of the World"
- Dan McKinna – bass guitars and vocals
- Andy Nice – cello on "Come Feel the Sun" and "All the Love"
- Suzanne Osborne – vocals on "All the Love"
- Louise Peacock – violin
- James SK Wān – ocarina
- Julian Siegel – bass clarinet
- Lucy Wilkins – lead violin and string arrangements on "The Other Side of the World", "The Organist Entertains" and "Mother Dear"
- Sarah Willson – cello

Technical personnel

- Philip Bagenal – recording
- Ian Caple – recording
- Anna Tjan – recording
- John Dent – mastering

== Chart performance ==
Chart (2008)	Peak position
Dutch Albums (Album Top 100)	44
Belgian Albums (Ultratop Flanders)	14
Belgian Albums (Ultratop Wallonia)	53
Danish Albums (Hitlisten)	24
French Albums (SNEP)	61
UK Albums (Official Charts)	81
