= Amsterdam February 94 =

Live album by Tindersticks
- Released: February 1994
- Recorded: Melkweg, Amsterdam, Netherlands; 8 February 1994
- Genre: chamber pop
- Label: This Way Up

Tindersticks chronology
Tindersticks (1993 album) (1993)	Amsterdam February 94 (1994)	Tindersticks (1995 album) (1995)

Amsterdam February 94 is a limited edition live album by British band Tindersticks. Recorded as part of their live concert on the 8 February 1994 at the Melkweg in Amsterdam, Netherlands, the album was only available by mail order or to purchase at the group's concerts. The 10" vinyl version was pressed on white vinyl and limited to 2000 numbered copies. In France, Germany and Canada the first 1000 copies of the first studio album Tindersticks were shrink-wrapped together with a CD of the Amsterdam February 94 album with a burgundy-coloured cover.

== Track listing ==
=== 10" LP ===
==== Side one ====
1. "Marbles"
2. "Tyed"
3. "Kathleen"
4. "Milky Teeth"
5. "Blood"

==== Side two ====
1. "Jism"
2. "Raindrops"
3. "Drunk Tank"
4. "For Those..."

=== CD ===
1. "Marbles" – 4:27
2. "Tyed" – 4:14
3. "Kathleen" – 5:23
4. "Milky Teeth" – 3:01
5. "Blood" – 4:51
6. "Jism" – 6:04
7. "Raindrops" – 6:56
8. "Drunk Tank" – 4:56
9. "For Those..." – 5:01
