= The Something Rain =

Studio album by Tindersticks
- Released: 20 February 2012
- Recorded: May 2010 – August 2011
- Studio: Le Chien Chanceux, Creuse, France
- Genre: Art rock, chamber pop
- Length: 50:14
- Label: Lucky Dog Recordings (UK); City Slang (Europe); Constellation (US & Canada)
- Producer: Stuart A. Staples

Tindersticks chronology
Claire Denis Film Scores 1996–2009 (2011)	The Something Rain (2012)	Across Six Leap Years (2013)

The Something Rain is the ninth studio album by English band Tindersticks, released in February 2012 on their own Lucky Dog Recordings label in the UK, on City Slang Records in Europe, and on Constellation Records in North America.

In 2012 it was awarded a double silver certification from the Independent Music Companies Association, which indicated sales of at least 40,000 copies throughout Europe.

== Recording ==
The initial impetus for making a new album came from ideas for a story EP written by keyboard player David Boulter (which became the opening track "Chocolate"), and the album was recorded in stages over the course of a year at the band's studio in France. The recording of the album was overshadowed by the deaths of several friends and family members, but the band were determined to react to the experience positively, rather than wallow in melancholia – Boulter said in an interview that "we didn't want that for the people that'd gone. It was more that the sadness gave us energy to push even harder. To do something great."

In a video interview with the Dutch online music magazine FaceCulture, singer Stuart Staples said the album's title was inspired by a story related by guitarist David Kitt, when Kitt had been sent to a songwriting workshop in the United States, and a fellow attendee was having trouble finding a suitable adjective to describe the song he was writing.

== Artwork ==
The album's cover is taken from a work of art titled Skies, September '10–September '11 by Staples' wife Suzanne Osborne, and photographed by guitarist Neil Fraser.

== Critical reception ==
Professional ratings
Review scores
Source	Rating
AllMusic	3.5/5 stars
Drowned in Sound	9/10
The Guardian	4/5 stars
The Independent on Sunday	4/5 stars
Mojo	3/5 stars
MusicOMH	4.5/5 stars
Pitchfork	8.1/10
Q	4/5 stars
Uncut	4/5 stars

Reviews for the album were generally positive. The Guardian noted that "Tindersticks' maudlin, jazz-streaked music feels as vividly wearied as ever". BBC Music said "At times, the results here are slightly obtuse... It may not be a Tindersticks classic, in the same vein as 1997's sublime Curtains, but The Something Rain is a record full of mystery and intrigue that will keep you listening—and discovering new things each time—for a good while" and Mojo said that "...for all its gentle yet intense reflection, it's never overtly maudlin". Uncut declared that Tindersticks were "a band who seem to have rediscovered new ways of putting together their already impressive constituent parts". Q stated that "their content has never strayed too far from their discomfort zone... The Something Rain keeps Tindersticks' value high." MusicOMH was enthusiastic, stating that "The Something Rain arguably tops [Falling Down a Mountain], seeing the band in superlative form... It may be nearly two decades since their debut album but The Something Rain sounds like a band in their prime, switching between styles effortlessly and enjoying a new lease of life." Drowned in Sound was similarly won over, declaring that "for the first time in nearly a decade, Tindersticks sound urgent again... The result is a glorious, heady swirl of a record... To be able to create something this beautiful at such an advanced stage in a bands lifespan is a true testament to the skill and sorcery found in every limb, larynx and lovelorn heart of this band."

Tindersticks keyboardist David Boulter later selected the album as his favorite Tindersticks release in a 2016 interview.

== Track listing ==
1. "Chocolate" (David Boulter) – 9:04
2. "Show Me Everything" (Boulter, Stuart Staples) – 5:29
3. "This Fire of Autumn" (Staples) – 4:17
4. "A Night So Still" (Dan McKinna, Staples) – 5:44
5. "Slippin' Shoes" (Staples) – 4:32
6. "Medicine" (Staples) – 4:59
7. "Frozen" (David Kitt, Staples) – 5:43
8. "Come Inside" (Staples) – 7:40
9. "Goodbye Joe" (Boulter) – 2:42

== Personnel ==
Tindersticks

- David Boulter – piano and organ, vocals on "Chocolate"
- Neil Fraser – electric and acoustic guitars
- Earl Harvin – drums and percussion
- Dan McKinna – bass
- Stuart A. Staples – vocals

Additional personnel

- Thomas Bloch – cristal baschet
- Terry Edwards – saxophone
- Gina Foster – vocals
- David Kitt – guitar
- Andy Nice – cello and soprano saxophone
- Julian Siegel – bass clarinet and tenor saxophone
- Will Wilde – chromatic harmonica

== Charts ==
Chart (2012)	Peak position
Austrian Albums (Ö3 Austria)	23
Belgian Albums (Ultratop Flanders)	21
Belgian Albums (Ultratop Wallonia)	48
Danish Albums (Hitlisten)	20
Dutch Albums (Album Top 100)	25
French Albums (SNEP)	37
German Albums (Offizielle Top 100)	29
Portuguese Albums (AFP)	22
Scottish Albums (OCC)	67
Spanish Albums (PROMUSICAE)	70
Swedish Albums (Sverigetopplistan)	51
Swiss Albums (Schweizer Hitparade)	37
UK Albums (OCC)	59
UK Album Downloads (OCC)	100
UK Independent Albums (OCC)	7
US Top Heatseekers Albums (Billboard)	28
