= Working for the Man =

Working for the Man may refer to:

- "Working for the Man" (song), by Roy Orbison
- "Working for the Man", a song by PJ Havrey from the 1995 album To Bring You My Love
- Working for the Man (album), by Tindersticks
