= The Bloomsbury Theatre 12.3.95 =

Live album by Tindersticks
- Released: 23 October 1995
- Recorded: 12 March 1995, Bloomsbury Theatre, London
- Label: This Way Up

Tindersticks chronology
Tindersticks (1995)	The Bloomsbury Theatre 12.3.95 (1995)	Nénette et Boni (soundtrack) (1996)

Professional ratings
Review scores
Source	Rating
Allmusic	4/5 stars

The Bloomsbury Theatre 12.3.95 is a live album by British band Tindersticks, released in October 1995 on both CD and double 10-inch vinyl. The CD was limited to 10000 copies and the vinyl to 8000 copies. Due to an error in production, the CD version has become rarer than the vinyl format. The album reached no. 32 in the UK album charts.

The album was reissued in 2004 as the second disc on the remastered edition of the second Tindersticks album Tindersticks, minus the bonus track "My Sister" which had only appeared on the vinyl version.

== Track listing ==
1. "El Diablo en el Ojo" – 3:38
2. "A Night In" – 6:42
3. "Talk To Me" – 5:05
4. "She's Gone" – 3:47
5. "My Sister" (vinyl only)
6. "No More Affairs" – 4:03
7. "City Sickness" – 3:58
8. "Vertrauen II" – 3:03
9. "Sleepy Song" – 4:27
10. "Jism" – 6:14
11. "Drunk Tank" – 4:34
12. "Mistakes" – 5:34
13. "Tiny Tears" – 5:54
14. "Raindrops" – 6:57
15. "For Those..." – 5:07

== Additional personnel ==
- Terry Edwards – trumpet and baritone saxophone
- Mike Kearsey – trombone, trumpet and French horn
- Tris Williams – percussion
- Orchestra conducted by Rosie Lindsell:
  - Violins – Lucy Wilkins, Calina de la Mare, Charles Nancarrow, Simon Bags, Craig Stratton, Natalia Bonner, Caroline Luckhurst, Christina Taylor, Susannah Marsden, Nia Bevan, Vic Evans, Dmitri van Zwanenberg, Beccy Doe and Sian McInally
  - Violas – Ann Child, Tim Siddall, Fiona Griffiths, Emily Frith, Rob Spriggs and Mike Briggs
  - Cellos – Sarah Willson, Helen Thomas, Will Burrows and Ben Chappell
