= Distractions (disambiguation) =

Distractions are processes of diverting the attention of an individual or group from a desired area of focus.

Distractions may also refer to:

== Music ==
- The Distractions, a new wave band from Manchester
- Distractions (Tindersticks album), 2021
- Distractions (The RH Factor album), 2006
- Distractions (The Loved Ones EP), 2009
- Distractions (Regurgitator EP), 2010
- "Distractions", a song by Paul McCartney from the 1989 album Flowers in the Dirt
- "Distractions", a 2006 song by bravecaptain

== Television ==
- "Distractions" (Heroes), a 2007 episode of the television series Heroes
- "Distractions" (House), a 2006 episode of the television series House

== See also ==
- Distraction (disambiguation)
