= Trouble Every Day =

Trouble Every Day may refer to:

- "Trouble Every Day" (song) (1966) by Frank Zappa and The Mothers of Invention
- Trouble Every Day (film) (2001) by Claire Denis
- Trouble Every Day (soundtrack) (2001) by Tindersticks, accompanying the film
