= Immobile (album) =

Studio album by Autour de Lucie
- Released: January 27, 1998
- Genre: Rock
- Length: 41:33
- Label: Nettwerk
- Producer: Giles Martin

Autour de Lucie chronology
L'Échappée belle (1994)	Immobile (1998)	Faux mouvement (2001)

Professional ratings
Review scores
Source	Rating
Allmusic	4.5/5 stars

Immobile, an album by Autour de Lucie, was released in 1998 on the Nettwerk label. Total running time is 41:33.

== Track listing ==
1. "Selon l'humeur" – 1:49
2. "Immobile" – 3:07
3. "Qu'avons-nous fait" – 4:00
4. "Chanson sans issue – ne vois-tu pas" – 3:21
5. "La vérité – sur ceux qui mentent" – 4:31
6. "Sur tes pas" – 3:21
7. "Sagrada familia" – 1:22
8. "L'eau qui dort" – 2:56
9. "L'autre nous" – 3:58
10. "Les promesses" – 3:42
11. "Je vous ai tué ce matin" – 3:26
12. "Atomium" – 1:53
13. "La deuxième chance" – 4:07
14. "Chanson sans issue – ne vois-tu pas" – remix – 6:21
