= Can Our Love... =

Studio album by Tindersticks
- Released: 21 May 2001
- Genres: Chamber pop, alternative pop
- Length: 45:41
- Label: Beggars Banquet
- Producer: Tindersticks with Ian Caple

Tindersticks chronology
Simple Pleasure (1999)	Can Our Love... (2001)	Trouble Every Day (2001)

Can Our Love... is the fifth studio album by British band Tindersticks, released in May 2001 on the Beggars Banquet record label.

== Reception ==
=== Commercial performance ===
Can Our Love... entered the UK Albums Chart during the week ending 2 June 2001 and peaked at number 47.

=== Critical response ===
Professional ratings
Aggregate scores
Source	Rating
Metacritic	81/100
Review scores
Source	Rating
AllMusic	4/5 stars
Billboard	(favourable)
NME	3.5/5 stars
Pitchfork	8.1/10
The Village Voice	(neutral)

Can Our Love... was met with "universal acclaim" reviews from critics. At Metacritic, which assigns a weighted average rating out of 100 to reviews from mainstream publications, this release received an average score of 81, based on 17 reviews.

== Track listing ==
1. "Dying Slowly" – 4:36
2. "People Keep Comin' Around" – 7:11
3. "Tricklin'" – 2:15
4. "Can Our Love..." – 5:57
5. "Sweet Release" – 8:55
6. "Don't Ever Get Tired" – 3:07
7. "No Man in the World" – 6:06
8. "Chilitetime" – 7:34

== Charts ==
Chart performance for Can Our Love...
Chart (2001)	Peak position
French Albums (SNEP)	76
German Albums (Offizielle Top 100)	99
Irish Albums (IRMA)	30
Scottish Albums (Official Charts)	84
UK Albums (Official Charts)	47
UK Independent Albums (Official Charts)	5
