= Autour de Lucie =

French pop rock band

Autour de Lucie is a French pop rock band, founded by vocalist Valérie Leulliot, guitarist Olivier Durand and bassist Fabrice Dumont. Their albums were released in France on Le Village Vert, and in North America on Nettwerk (first three) and Universal.

Their debut album L'Échappée belle was released in 1993 but was later re-released by Nettwerk and Le Village Vert in 1996 under the title Autour De Lucie with the bonus English-language track "Simon". Songs were produced by either Paco Rodriguez, Michael Head, or Autour de Lucie, and the album was characterized by guitar-driven songs with infectious pop hooks. It was led off by the buoyant, breezy "L'accord parfait" and included a cover version of the English-language ballad "Island", originally composed for the soundtrack of the British film "The Wicker Man".

Their album Immobile pursued the same sound established by their first effort. It was produced by Giles Martin and Autour de Lucie, and included a few experimental instrumental tracks as well as the catchy, synth-driven "Chanson sans issue (ne vois-tu pas)". A remix of their song was included as a bonus track and another remix appeared on the compilation wallpaper*mach 1.5 *The sound that surrounds you.

Though much of their subdued, languid 2000 album Faux Mouvement, produced by Ian Caple with Autour de Lucie, continued to follow the same guitar-oriented sound, several songs on the album featured a greater integration of electronic elements, effects, and beats, including samples, distortions, and loops.

Consequently, several songs from the album Faux mouvement were remixed by the likes of Radiostatic, Tarwater, Isolée, and others on their 2001 remix compilation Vu par....

Their 2004 album autour de lucie was produced by a new producer, Stéphane "Alf" Briat (known for his work with the French electronic act Air), and saw the band return to their original sound, albeit with more sophisticated arrangements and less overt pop leanings. The album ranged from the introspective "Avril en octobre" and piano ballad "Mon toujours partant" to the uptempo "Nos vies limitrophes" and included one English-language song ("Guiding hands").

Autour de Lucie is mentioned in Glamorama, the 2000 novel from Bret Easton Ellis (section 4, chapter 36).

Their song "Les Promesses" was featured in the 2004 film Eurotrip.

Since 2004, the band had remained dormant, reforming in 2012 with Valérie Leulliot and Sébastien Lafargue.

The reformed band released a new album titled Ta Lumière Particulière on April 27, 2015

== Discography ==
- L'Échappée belle (1994)
- Les Ciels de traîne EP (1994)
- Autour de Lucie (re-release of L'Échappée belle) (1996)
- Immobile (1998)
- Faux Mouvement (2000)
- Vu Par remix compilation (2002)
- autour de lucie (2004)
- Ta lumière particulière (2015)
- Bunker / Rouge Invisible (2020)
