= L'Échappée belle =

Studio album by Autour de Lucie
- Released: 1994
- Genre: Rock
- Label: Nettwerk

Autour de Lucie chronology
L'Échappée belle (1994)	Immobile (1998)

L'Échappée belle, an album by Autour de Lucie, was released in 1994 on the Nettwerk label. It was re-released by Nettwerk and Le Village Vert under the title Autour De Lucie with a bonus track, "Simon".

== Track listing ==
1. "L'accord parfait"
2. "La ballade du déserteur"
3. "Les ciels de traîne"
4. "Le tournesol"
5. "Island"
6. "Comme si de rien n'était"
7. "Au large déjà"
8. "Ce que l'on tait"
9. "Les anomalies"
10. "Marie (ceux qui ne rêvent pas aux étoiles)"
11. "Les brouillons"
