= Claire Denis Film Scores 1996–2009 =

Soundtrack album by Tindersticks
- Released: 26 April 2011
- Recorded: 1996–2009
- Label: Constellation Records

Tindersticks chronology
Falling Down a Mountain (2010)	Claire Denis Film Scores 1996–2009 (2011)	The Something Rain (2012)

Claire Denis Film Scores 1996–2009 is a compilation album by Tindersticks. Released in 2011, the albums compiles the soundtrack music scored by the band to six films by Claire Denis. This creative partnership began in 1996 when Denis approached the band about using the song "My Sister" from the second Tindersticks album in the film she was scripting, Nénette et Boni. Singer Stuart A. Staples liked the idea, but suggested Tindersticks write something original for the film instead.

== Track listing ==
=== CD1: White Material (2009) ===
1. "Opening" 2:39
2. "Bus Vision 1" 3:15
3. "The Boxer" 1:55
4. "White Material" 1:48
5. "Children's Theme 1" 1:58
6. "Maria And The Boxer" 1:17
7. "Workers" 1:26
8. "Andre And The Old Man" 1:13
9. "Yellow Dog" 3:36
10. "Maria And The Old Man" 1:54
11. "Maria And The Sheriff" 1:56
12. "Andre's Death" 2:19
13. "Children's Theme 2" 2:45
14. "Attack On The Pharmacy" 3:02
15. "Bus Vision 2" 1:05
16. "Closing" 5:47

=== CD2: 35 Rhums (2008) ===
1. "Opening" 2:26
2. "Train Montage 1" 3:34
3. "Night Time Apartments" 2:04
4. "Night Train" 3:01
5. "Lionel Home Drunk" 1:44
6. "Train Montage 2" 2:26
7. "René's Death" 2:18
8. "Lubec" 1:47
9. "Mechtilde" 1:16
10. "Lanterns" 1:01
11. "The Necklace" 1:18
12. "Closing" 2:45

=== CD3: L'Intrus (2004) & Vendredi soir (2002) ===
1. "Opening" 2:08
2. "Binoculars" 1:31
3. "Running Dogs" 1:30
4. "Night Drive" 1:12
5. "Horse Dream" 3:21
6. "Pusan Snow" 2:51
7. "The Purple Sea" 2:46
8. "Sleepless Night" 1:51
9. "The Black Mountain" 2:28
10. "Closing" 3:31
11. "Nightfall" 2:11
12. "Le Vestibule" 1:43
13. "Le Rallye" 3:55
14. "Falling Asleep" 2:00
15. "Jean" 0:34
16. "Street Fight" 1:01
17. "Laure's Theme" 1:48
18. "Hotel Love" 2:34
19. "Footsteps" 1:44
20. "La Voiture" 1:51
21. "Chambre 26" 0:55
22. "Sunrise" 3:26

=== CD4: Trouble Every Day (2001) ===
1. "Opening Titles" 3:19
2. "Dream" 1:27
3. "Houses" 0:58
4. "Maid Theme" 2:05
5. "Room 321" 4:04
6. "Computer" 1:53
7. "Notre Dame" 1:40
8. "Killing Theme" 3:14
9. "Taxi To Coré" 1:32
10. "Coré On Stairs, Love Theme" 4:41
11. "Maid Theme [End]" 2:06
12. "Closing Titles" 5:50
13. "Killing Theme (Alternative Version)" 2:49
14. "Trouble Every Day" 5:39

=== CD5: Nénette et Boni (1996) ===
1. "Ma Soeur" 2:48
2. "La Passerelle" 4:18
3. "Les Gâteaux" 1:01
4. "Camions" 2:51
5. "Nénette Est Là" 1:32
6. "Petites Chiennes" 2:00
7. "Nosfératu" 1:12
8. "Petites Gouttes D'eau" 5:26
9. "Les Cannes À Pêche" 2:50
10. "La Mort De Félix" 1:32
11. "Nénette S'en Va" 2:19
12. "Les Bébés" 1:32
13. "Les Fleurs" 1:06
14. "Rumba" 6:54
