= Faux mouvement =

Studio album by Autour de Lucie
- Released: March 13, 2001
- Genre: Rock
- Length: 50:12
- Label: Nettwerk
- Producer: Ian Caple

Autour de Lucie chronology
Immobile (1998)	Faux mouvement (2001)	Vu Par (2002)

Professional ratings
Review scores
Source	Rating
Allmusic	4/5 stars

Faux mouvement, an album by Autour de Lucie, was released in 2001 on the Nettwerk label. Many of the songs also appear remixed on their 2001 remix compilation Vu par ....

== Track listing ==
1. "Je Reviens" – 6:10
2. "Je Suis un Balancier" – 6:47
3. "Sans Commentaire" – 2:51
4. "Vide" – 3:46
5. "Chanson De L'Arbre" – 4:48
6. "Lent" – 4:12
7. "Corps Etrangers" – 4:41
8. "La Condition Pour Aimer" – 3:01
9. "La Contradiction" – 4:56
10. "Le Salon" – 3:57
11. "Le Dernier Mot" – 5:03
