= BBC Sessions (Tindersticks album) =

Compilation album by Tindersticks
- Released: 2007
- Label: Island

Professional ratings
Review scores
| Source | Rating |
|---|---|
| Record Collector | 5/5 stars |

BBC Sessions is an album by Tindersticks, released on Island Records in 2007. The double CD compiled 26 tracks recorded by the band for the BBC between 1993 and 1997.
