= Leave No Trace (soundtrack) =

Leave No Trace (Original Motion Picture Soundtrack)

Film score by Dickon Hinchliffe
- Released: June 29, 2018 (standard); August 10, 2018 (deluxe)
- Recorded: 2018
- Genre: Film score
- Length: 29:16 (standard); 37:15 (deluxe)
- Label: Lakeshore Records
- Producer: Dickon Hinchliffe

Dickon Hinchliffe chronology
| Ordinary World (2016) | Leave No Trace (2018) | Ben Is Back (2018) |

Leave No Trace (Original Motion Picture Soundtrack) is the score album to the 2018 film Leave No Trace directed by Debra Granik. The film's musical score is composed by Tindersticks frontman Dickon Hinchliffe in second collaboration with Granik after Winter's Bone (2010). Lakeshore Records released the soundtrack on June 29, 2018.

== Release ==
The soundtrack was released through Lakeshore Records on June 29, 2018, alongside the film. A deluxe edition with two additional tracks the album accompanied on August 10. This album featured the end credits song "Moon Boat" performed by Kendra Smith and The Magician's Orchestra; it was also Smith's solo recording since 1996. A vinyl LP was distributed by Sutro Park Records in 2021.

== Critical reception ==
Mark Kermode of The Guardian wrote "Dickon Hinchliffe’s musical cues are beautifully sparse, consisting mostly of polytonal drones (rather than melodies), interspersed by song". Richard Lawson of Vanity Fair called it as an "aching score". Diane Carson of KDHX wrote "Dickon Hinchliffe's music seldom interprets the mood, but when it does, tension increases exponentially." David Ehrlich of IndieWire called it "minimalistic". Jon Frosch of The Hollywood Reporter and Peter Debruge of Variety called it a "moving score".

== Track listing ==
Standard edition
| No. | Title | Length |
|---|---|---|
| 1. | "Forest Park" | 1:18 |
| 2. | "Rough Country" | 2:02 |
| 3. | "The Runner" | 1:13 |
| 4. | "Taken" | 1:35 |
| 5. | "Drive to the Farm" | 2:26 |
| 6. | "Raid" | 1:38 |
| 7. | "Return to the Forest" | 2:41 |
| 8. | "Lost" | 2:39 |
| 9. | "Not That Kind of Trouble" | 1:30 |
| 10. | "Tiny House" | 0:57 |
| 11. | "Shelter" | 3:38 |
| 12. | "The Long Night" | 1:40 |
| 13. | "Finding Will" | 1:33 |
| 14. | "Bus Out of Town" | 2:06 |
| 15. | "We Share a Star" | 2:20 |
| Total length: | | 29:16 |

Deluxe edition
| No. | Title | Length |
|---|---|---|
| 16. | "Sunshine" | 2:59 |
| 17. | "Moon Boat" (performed by Kendra Smith and The Magician's Orchestra) | 5:00 |
| Total length: | | 37:15 |

== Release history ==
| Region | Edition | Date | Format(s) | Label | Ref. |
|---|---|---|---|---|---|
| Various | Standard | June 29, 2018 | Digital download; streaming | Lakeshore | |
| Various | Deluxe | August 10, 2018 | Digital download; streaming | Lakeshore | |
| Various | Deluxe | 2021 | Vinyl | Sutro Park | |
