= The Waiting Room (Tindersticks album) =

Studio album by Tindersticks
- Released: 22 January 2016
- Genre: Chamber pop
- Length: 48:00
- Label: City Slang; Lucky Dog

Tindersticks chronology
Across Six Leap Years (2013)	The Waiting Room (2016)	No Treasure but Hope (2019)

The Waiting Room is the eleventh studio album by the English band Tindersticks, released on 22 January 2016 on the City Slang label. Some editions of the album came packaged with a short film that had been commissioned for each song by various directors.

== Music ==
Opening track "Follow Me" was the final song recorded for the album. When the band needed a piece of music to act as an introduction, Stuart Staples and musical arranger Julian Siegel used the melody from Bronisław Kaper's soundtrack to the 1962 film Mutiny on the Bounty, which Staples had found himself humming as he walked down the street. "We Are Dreamers!" features vocals by Jehnny Beth of Savages, who recorded her part in ten minutes.

== Reception ==
Professional ratings
Aggregate scores
Source	Rating
Metacritic	82/100
Review scores
Source	Rating
AllMusic	3.5/5 stars
The A.V. Club	B+
DIY	3/5 stars
Drowned in Sound	8/10
The Guardian	4/5 stars
Pitchfork	8.0/10
PopMatters	8/10 stars

At Metacritic, which assigns a normalised rating out of 100 to reviews from mainstream critics, The Waiting Room received an average score of 82, based on 20 reviews, indicating "universal acclaim". Marc Burrows of Drowned in Sound called it "a rich, warm, comfort blanket of a record, marbled with veins of darkness and light", while AllMusic reviewer Thom Jurek called it a "mixed bag".

=== Accolades ===
Publication	Accolade	Year	Rank
Rough Trade	Albums of the Year	2016	13

== Track listing ==
All songs written by Stuart A. Staples, except where noted.

1. "Follow Me" (Bronislau Kaper) – 2:45
2. "Second Chance Man" – 3:56
3. "Were We Once Lovers?" – 4:49
4. "Help Yourself" – 5:38
5. "Hey Lucinda" (featuring Lhasa de Sela) – 5:16
6. "This Fear of Emptiness" (David Boulter) – 3:59
7. "How He Entered" (Dan McKinna, Staples) – 4:46
8. "The Waiting Room" – 4:54
9. "Planting Holes" (Boulter) – 2:03
10. "We Are Dreamers!" – 5:21
11. "Like Only Lovers Can" (Boulter, Staples) – 4:33

== Charts ==
=== Weekly charts ===
Chart (2016)	Peak position
Austrian Albums (Ö3 Austria)	8
Belgian Albums (Ultratop Flanders)	13
Belgian Albums (Ultratop Wallonia)	44
Dutch Albums (Album Top 100)	24
French Albums (SNEP)	49
German Albums (Offizielle Top 100)	20
Irish Albums (IRMA)	46
Portuguese Albums (AFP)	15
Scottish Albums (OCC)	74
Swiss Albums (Schweizer Hitparade)	30
UK Albums (OCC)	71

=== Year-end charts ===
Chart (2016)	Position
Belgian Albums (Ultratop Flanders)	187
