= No Treasure but Hope =

Studio album by Tindersticks
- Released: 15 November 2019
- Recorded: 29 April – 3 May 2019, 9 & 10 May 2019
- Studio: Midilive, Paris; RAK Studios, London; Eastcote Studio, London
- Length: 46:08
- Label: Lucky Dog Recordings/City Slang
- Producer: Stuart A. Staples

Tindersticks chronology
The Waiting Room (2016)	No Treasure but Hope (2019)	Distractions (2021)

Singles from No Treasure but Hope
- 1. "The Amputees" Released: 10 September 2019; 2. "See My Girls" Released: 23 January 2020

Professional ratings
Aggregate scores
Source	Rating
AnyDecentMusic?	7.3/10
Metacritic	79/100
Review scores
Source	Rating
AllMusic	4/5 stars
Financial Times	4/5 stars
The Guardian	4/5 stars
The Irish Times	3/5 stars
Mojo	3/5 stars
musicOMH	4/5 stars
Pitchfork	7.8/10
Q	4/5 stars
The Skinny	3/5 stars
Uncut	4/5 stars

No Treasure but Hope is the twelfth studio album by English alternative rock band Tindersticks, released on 15 November 2019 on Lucky Dog Recordings/City Slang. Although the album failed to chart in the UK, it achieved modest chart placings in other European countries.

== Background ==
Tindersticks announced the album via a press release on 10 September 2019. The band also shared the album's track listing, artwork and its first single, "The Amputees", along with the single's video, featuring animation from singer Stuart Staples' wife Suzanne Osborne and directed by Staples.

On 23 January 2020, the band released the four-track See My Girls EP, featuring a radio edit and an instrumental version of the album track "See My Girls" as well as two new songs. The video produced for "See My Girls" was a collaboration between Staples and his daughter Sydonie Osborne Staples.

== Track listing ==
All songs are written by Stuart Staples except where noted.

1. "For the Beauty" (Dan McKinna, Staples) – 4:46
2. "The Amputees" (McKinna, Staples) – 3:27
3. "Trees Fall" – 5:04
4. "Pinky in the Daylight" – 5:22
5. "Carousel" – 4:39
6. "Take Care in Your Dreams" (McKinna, David Boulter, Neil Fraser, Staples) – 3:57
7. "See My Girls" – 5:28
8. "The Old Mans Gait" (Boulter, Staples) – 4:43
9. "Tough Love" (Boulter, Staples) – 4:57
10. "No Treasure but Hope" – 3:51

== Personnel ==
Tindersticks

- Stuart Staples – vocals, acoustic rhythm guitar on "Pinky in the Daylight", "Carousel", "Take Care in Your Dreams", "See My Girls" and "The Old Mans Gait"
- David Boulter – vibraphone, organ, piano on "See My Girls" and "Tough Love"
- Neil Fraser – electric guitar
- Dan McKinna – double bass, backing vocals, piano on "For the Beauty", "Pinky in the Daylight", "Carousel" and "No Treasure but Hope", string and horn arrangements
- Earl Harvin – percussion, backing vocals

Additional personnel

- Natalia Bonner – violin
- Calina de la Mare – violin
- Alison Dods – violin
- Terry Edwards – saxophone on "Tough Love"
- Adam Goldsmith – bouzouki on "Pinky in the Daylight"
- Howard Gott – violin
- Matt Gunner – horns
- Rick Coster – violin
- Laura Melhuish – violin
- Andy Nice – cello
- Kate Robinson – violin
- Rachel Robson – viola
- Tom Rumsby – horns
- Sophie Sirota – viola
- Rob Spriggs – viola
- Richard Steggall – horns
- Stanley Staples – acoustic rhythm guitar on "The Amputees", "Trees Fall", "Take Care in Your Dreams", "See My Girls", "The Old Mans Gait" and "Tough Love"
- Lucy Wilkins – violin
- Sarah Willson – cello

Production

- Richard Dumas – artwork
- Côme Jalibert – field recording
- Suzanne Osborne – artwork
- Stuart Staples – artwork

== Charts ==
Chart (2019)	Peak position
Austrian Albums (Ö3 Austria)	41
Belgian Albums (Ultratop Flanders)	39
Belgian Albums (Ultratop Wallonia)	92
Dutch Albums (Album Top 100)	99
French Albums (SNEP)	64
German Albums (Offizielle Top 100)	29
Portuguese Albums (AFP)	10
Spanish Albums (PROMUSICAE)	66
Swiss Albums (Schweizer Hitparade)	53
