= Vu Par =

Studio album by Autour de Lucie
- Released: March 5, 2002
- Genre: Rock
- Length: 51:20
- Label: Sony

Autour de Lucie chronology
Faux mouvement (2001)	Vu Par (2002)	Autour de Lucie (2004)

Vu Par, an album of remixed Autour de Lucie tracks, was released in 2001 on the Le Village Vert label and in 2002 on the Sony International label.

== Track listing ==
1. "Chanson de l'Arbre" – 5:13
2. "Chanson de l'Arbre" – 5:06
3. "Je Reviens" – 5:49
4. "Mercenaires" – 2:54
5. "Je Reviens" – 4:40
6. "La Contradiction" – 4:22
7. "Je Suis un Balancier" – 4:56
8. "La Condition Pour Aimer" – 5:11
9. "La Contradiction" – 3:46
10. "Lent" – 9:23

== Sources and links ==
- Vu Par at AllMusic
