= Distraction (disambiguation) =

Distraction is the process of diverting the attention of an individual or group from a desired area of focus.

Distraction may also refer to:

== Media ==
- Distraction (game show), a game show that aired on Channel 4 in the United Kingdom
- Distraction (album), a 2014 album by Bear Hands
- "Distraction" (Kehlani song), 2016
- "Distraction" (Polo G song), 2022
- "Distraction", a song by Angels & Airwaves from the album We Don't Need to Whisper
- "Distraction" (novel), a 1998 book by Bruce Sterling

== Medicine ==
- Distraction osteogenesis, a method in orthopedic surgery
- Distraction injury of the vertebral column

== See also ==
- Distractions (disambiguation)
