= Until the Earth Begins to Part =

Studio album by Broken Records
- Released: 1 June 2009
- Recorded: Monnow Valley Studio, Monmouth – January 2009
- Genre: Indie folk, indie rock, chamber pop
- Length: 41:34
- Label: 4AD (CAD 2921)
- Producer: Ian Caple, Broken Records

Broken Records chronology
| Until the Earth Begins to Part (2009) | Out on the Water (EP) (2009) |

Professional ratings
Review scores
| Source | Rating |
|---|---|
| Allmusic | link |
| Drowned in Sound | 5/10 link |
| Pitchfork Media | 4.9/10 link |
| Q | (Issue 276) |
| The Skinny | link |
| Spin | link |
| Stereokill | link |

Until the Earth Begins to Part is the debut studio album by Scottish indie rock band Broken Records, released on 1 June 2009 by 4AD. Prior to the album's release, the band released three singles: "If the News Makes You Sad, Don't Watch It" in April 2008, "Slow Parade" in August 2008, and "Lies" in November 2008. The first proper single from the debut album was the title track, released on 11 May 2009.

An accompanying three-track EP CD, recorded live at Avalanche Records in Edinburgh, was given away for free to those who purchased the album at Avalanche Records stores.

== Track listing ==
1. "Nearly Home" – 5:31
2. "If the News Makes You Sad, Don't Watch It" – 4:21
3. "Until the Earth Begins to Part" – 3:31
4. "A Promise" – 5:01
5. "Thoughts on a Picture (In a Paper, January 2009)" – 4:07
6. "If Eilert Loveborg Wrote a Song, It Would Sound Like This" – 3:47
7. "Wolves" – 3:46
8. "Ghosts" – 3:58
9. "A Good Reason" – 4:08
10. "Slow Parade" – 4:29

== Singles ==
- "Until the Earth Begins to Part" (7" vinyl and download, 11 May 2009)
  1. "Until the Earth Begins to Part" – 3:32
  2. "And They All Fell Into the Sea" – 3:31
- "A Good Reason" (download, September 2009)
  1. "A Good Reason" – 4:08

== Personnel ==
The following people contributed to Until the Earth Begins to Part:

=== Band ===
- Jamie Sutherland – vocals
- Rory Sutherland – violin, guitar, accordion
- Ian Turnbull – guitar, piano, accordion
- Arne Kolb – cello
- Dave Smith – piano, trumpet
- Andrew Keeny – drums
- David Fothergill – bass

=== Additional musicians ===
- E. Harvard – tenor horn ("Nearly Home", "If the News Makes You Sad, Don't Watch It", "A Good Reason" and "Slow Parade")
- J. Pippen – trombone ("Nearly Home", "If the News Makes You Sad, Don't Watch It", "A Good Reason" and "Slow Parade")
- C. Sefton – tuba ("Nearly Home", "If the News Makes You Sad, Don't Watch It", "A Good Reason" and "Slow Parade")
- D. Guy – double bass ("Nearly Home" "Wolves" and "Slow Parade")
- J. Bayley – viola ("Nearly Home" "Wolves" and "Slow Parade")

=== Recording personnel ===
- Ian Caple – producer, engineer, mixing
- Broken Records – producer
- Tom Manning – assistant
- Jean-Pierre Chalbos – mastering

=== Artwork ===
- Sarah Foley – art direction, design, illustrations
