= Autour de Lucie (album) =

Studio album by Autour de Lucie
- Released: May 11, 2004
- Genre: Rock
- Length: 42:46
- Label: Le Village Vert

Autour de Lucie chronology
Vu Par (2002)	Autour de Lucie (2004)

autour de lucie, an album by the French band Autour de Lucie, was released in 2004 on the Le Village Vert label.

== Track listing ==
No.	Title	Length
1.	"Noyés dans la masse"	4:31
2.	"Nos vies limitrophes"	3:29
3.	"Personne n'est comme toi"	3:12
4.	"Avril en octobre"	4:06
5.	"Sans moi"	2:47
6.	"Dans quel pays"	3:56
7.	"Femme à l'eau de vie"	3:33
8.	"Mon toujours partant"	3:32
9.	"La grande évasion"	3:44
10.	"Guiding hands"	3:52
11.	"Les homme peuvent être"	6:04
