= 4.48 Psychosis =

Play by Sarah Kane

- 2025 London Revival Poster
- Original language: English
- Written by: Sarah Kane
- Characters: None
- Subject: Clinical depression; dissociation; disappearing from existence
- Setting: None

Premiere
- Date: 23 June 2000
- Place: Royal Court Jerwood Theatre Upstairs, London

4.48 Psychosis is the final play by British playwright Sarah Kane. It was first staged at the Royal Court's Jerwood Theatre Upstairs on 23 June 2000, directed by James Macdonald, nearly one and a half years after Kane's death on 20 February 1999. The play has no explicit characters or stage directions. Stage productions of the play vary greatly, therefore, with between one and several actors in performance; the original production featured three actors. According to Kane's friend and fellow playwright David Greig, the title of the play derives from the time, 4:48 a.m., when Kane, in her depressed state, often woke.

== Subject ==
The play is usually interpreted as an expression of the experience of clinical depression, a disorder from which Kane suffered. She died by suicide after writing the play, before its initial performance. Contemplation and discussion of suicide are prominent and while there is no strict narrative or timeline, certain issues and events are clearly dealt with: deciding whether to take medication to treat depression, the desires of the depressed mind, the effects and effectiveness of medication, self-harm, suicide and the possible causes of depression. Other themes that run throughout the script, in addition to depression, are those of isolation, dependency, relationships, and love.

== Form ==
4.48 Psychosis is composed of twenty-four sections which have no specified setting, characters or stage directions. Its language varies between dialogues, confessions and contemplative poetic monologues reminiscent of schizophasia. Certain images are repeated within the script, particularly that of "hatch opens, stark light"; a repeated motif in the play is "serial sevens" which involves counting down from one hundred by sevens, a bedside test often used by psychiatrists to test for loss of concentration or memory.

== Productions ==
Owing to its form, productions of the play differ vastly in their staging, casting and design. The initial production of 4.48 Psychosis at the Royal Court in 2000 had a cast of three: Daniel Evans, Jo McInnes and Madeleine Potter. There have been performances of 4.48 Psychosis at the Théâtre-Studio à Alfortville stage by Christian Benedetti (2001) at The Theatre Les Bouffes Du Nord in Paris (2005), Belarus Free Theatre in Minsk (2005), KUFER theatre in Croatia (2005.), Old Red Lion Theatre (Tangram Theatre, 2006), Arcola Theatre (2006), the Young Vic Theatre (2009), the Barbican Theatre (TR Warszawa, Easter 2010), Access Theatre (Raw Theatre Group, Easter 2010), The Theatre Project (Off Off-Broadway - The Red Room, Summer 2010), ADC Theatre (October 2010), York Theatre Royal (March 2011), Sittingbourne Community College Theatre Company (July 2011), The Hamilton Fringe Festival at Theatre Aquarius [Black Box Fire Theatre Company, July 2011] and the George Ignatieff Theatre at University of Toronto (27–29 October 2011), Academy of performing arts in Bratislava, Slovakia directed by Sandra Polovková, Fourth Monkey Theatre Company (March 2012), Rangi Ruru Girls' School performed it in the New Zealand Theatre Federation Festival (September 2012), Crooked Pieces (Drayton Theatre London, September 2012), The Questors Theatre (January 2015), director Roza Sarkisian and Theatre Actor, Kyiv, Ukraine (2018), Anton's Well Theater Company, Oakland, California (July—August 2018), Theatre Populus, Žilina, Slovakia (October 2018) directed by Matej Trnovec and Chico State Theater Company at California State University, Chico (December 2022) directed by Susana Correa.

A critically acclaimed adaptation of the play, as translated into Polish with English language surtitles, was performed at the 2008 Edinburgh International Festival by the Polish theatre company TR Warszawa. The production starred Polish film actress Magdalena Cielecka and featured a number of other performers from TR Warszawa in supporting roles. This was a revival of TR Warszawa's earlier production of the play, as performed in Warsaw. In 2003, there was a successful staging in Brazil, which played to a full house for six consecutive months in São Paulo, and also gained media attention for its defying gender aspect, as the role was performed by male actor Luiz Päetow. Indian director Arvind Gaur performed this play as a one-woman show with British actress Ruth Sheard in 2005. 16 years after the original production, the play will be revived at the Théâtre-Studio à Alfortville stage by Christian Benedetti 25 years after the original production, the play will be revived at the Royal Court Theatre and The Other Place, Stratford-upon-Avon (Royal Shakespeare Company) featuring the original cast (Daniel Evans, Jo McInnes and Madeleine Potter) and creative team (directed by James Macdonald) in June and July 2025. 4.48 Psychosis will be revived again by Christian Benedetti at the Théâtre-Studio à Alfortville in 2027

== Reception ==
4.48 Psychosis has divided critical opinions. Michael Billington of The Guardian newspaper asked, "How on earth do you award aesthetic points to a 75-minute suicide note?" Charles Spencer of the Telegraph said "it is impossible not to view it as a deeply personal howl of pain.” David Greig considered the play to be "perhaps uniquely painful in that it appears to have been written in the almost certain knowledge that it would be performed posthumously."

== Opera ==
An operatic adaptation of 4.48 Psychosis, commissioned by Royal Opera and written by British composer Philip Venables, was staged at the Lyric Hammersmith in 2016. The first such adaptation of Kane's works, the production was approved by Sarah Kane's brother, and received critical acclaim.

== References to the play ==
The British indie-rock band Tindersticks released a song called "4.48 Psychosis" on their album Waiting for the Moon. The song's spoken-word lyrics are excerpted from the play.

== Citations ==
- Greig, David. 2001. Introduction. Complete Plays by Sarah Kane. London: Methuen. ISBN 978-0-413-74260-5. p.ix-xviii.
- Kane, Sarah. 2001. 4:48 Psychosis. In Complete Plays. London: Methuen, 2001. ISBN 978-0-413-74260-5. p. 203-245.
- Ryan, Betsy Alayne. 1984. Gertrude Stein's Theatre of the Absolute. Theater and Dramatic Studies Ser., 21. Ann Arbor and London: UMI Research Press. ISBN 0-8357-2021-7.
