= Live at the Botanique – 9th–12th May, 2001 =

Live album by Tindersticks
- Released: 2001
- Recorded: 9–12 May 2001

Live at the Botanique – 9th–12th May, 2001 is a live album by Tindersticks. The album was the first in a series of 'official bootlegs', and was only available during the band's October 2001 tour.

The recordings were made over four consecutive nights at Le Botanique, a cultural complex and music venue in Saint-Josse-ten-Noode, Brussels, housed in a former botanical garden building dating from 1826. The venue features three concert halls: the Rotonde (300 standing capacity), the Orangerie (approximately 700 capacity), and the Witloof Bar (approximately 200 capacity). The album was the first in a series of limited official bootlegs that Tindersticks released in 2001 and 2002, made available exclusively at their live shows during the October 2001 tour.

== Track listing ==
1. "Trouble Every Day"
2. "El Diablo en el Ojo"
3. "A Night In"
4. "Buried Bones"
5. "Tiny Tears"
6. "If She's Torn"
7. "Can Our Love"
8. "People Keep Coming 'Round"
9. "I Know that Loving"
10. "Cfgf"
