= Waiting for the Moon (album) =

Studio album by Tindersticks
- Released: 17 June 2003
- Recorded: September 2001 – January 2003
- Genre: Chamber pop
- Length: 45:37 min
- Label: Beggars Banquet
- Producer: Stuart Staples, Ian Caple

Tindersticks chronology
Trouble Every Day (2001)	Waiting for the Moon (2003)	The Hungry Saw (2008)

Professional ratings
Review scores
Source	Rating
AllMusic	3/5 stars
Pitchfork	(8.3/10)

Waiting for the Moon is the sixth studio album (or the eighth if including the soundtracks Nenette et Boni and Trouble Every Day) by Tindersticks. Recorded between September 2001 and January 2003 at Great Linford Manor, Eastcote and various home studios, the long-player was released on the Beggar's Banquet label in 2003. This was the last Tindersticks album to feature the band's original lineup before their extended hiatus and subsequent departure of half the band. Tindersticks member David Boulter later selected it as his least favorite Tindersticks album, remarking: "It has a feeling of something that was lost—the feeling that the band hadn't been great for a couple of albums."

== Track listing ==
1. "Until the Morning Comes" (Hinchliffe, Tindersticks) – 3:34
2. "Say Goodbye to the City" (Staples, Hinchliffe, Tindersticks) – 4:30
3. "Sweet Memory" (Hinchliffe, Tindersticks) – 4:29
4. "4.48 Psychosis" (Words by Sarah Kane, from her play, 4.48 Psychosis, Tindersticks) – 5:13
5. "Waiting for the Moon" (Staples, Hinchliffe) – 2:51
6. "Trying to Find a Home" (Staples, Hinchliffe, Boulter, Tindersticks) – 5:44
7. "Sometimes It Hurts" (Staples, Tindersticks) – 4:39
8. "My Oblivion" (Staples, Tindersticks) – 7:00
9. "Just a Dog" (Staples, Boulter, Tindersticks) – 3:28
10. "Running Wild" (Staples, Tindersticks) – 4:14

== Personnel ==
- Stuart Staples – vocals, guitar
- David Boulter – keyboards
- Neil Fraser – guitar
- Dickon Hinchliffe – violin
- Mark Colwill – bass
- Alistair Macaulay – drums

=== Additional musicians ===
- Gina Foster – vocals
- Colin McCan – timpanis
- Terry Edwards – trumpet (on track 2)
- Lhasa de Sela – vocal duet (on track 7)
- Steve Sidwell – trumpet
- Neil Sidwell – trombone
- Jamie Talbot – tenor saxophone
- Dave Bishop – baritone saxophone
- Lucy Wilkins, Calina De La Mare, Gillon Cameron, Anna Morris, Howard Gott, Ruth Gottlieb, Christopher Koh, Jacqueline Norrie, Louise Peacock, Wendy de St. Pear, Fiona Brice, Brian Wright, Catherine Browning, Sarah Button, David Williams – violins
- Robert Spriggs, Naomi Fairhurst, Emily Frith, Fiona Griffith, Vincent Greene, Sophie Sirota, Rebecca Ware, Reiad Chibahm Lucy Theo – violas
- Sarah Wilson, Andrew Nice, Chris Mansell, Oliver Kraus, Chris Worsey, Ian Burdge – cellos

=== Production ===
- Stuart Staples, Ian Caple – production
- Sam Miller, Antti Uusimaki, Haicong Guo – assistants
- Dickon Hinchliffe – arranger (strings and brass)
- Tim Young – mastering (at Metropolis, London)
- Suzanne Osborne – cover painting

== Notes ==
Both Canadian and Australian editions came with a bonus EP entitled Don't Even Go There. It included the tracks "Trying to Find a Home" (Boulter, Tindersticks), "Sexual Funk" (Boulter), "Everything Changes" (Boulter, Tindersticks) and "I Want You" (Hinchliffe, Tindersticks). This EP was released as a standalone single in the UK.
