= Broken Records (band) =

Scottish rock band

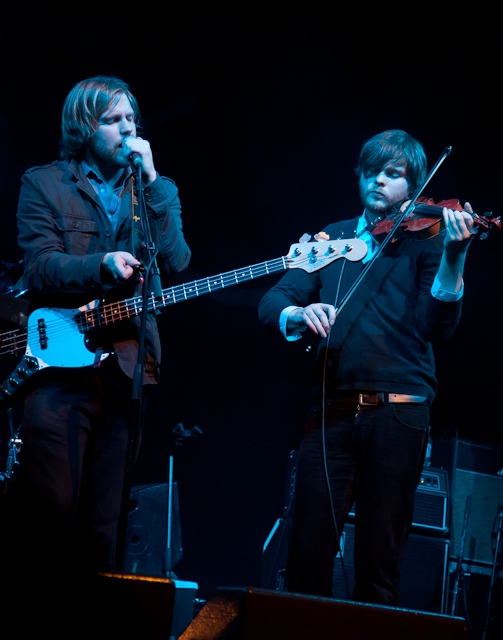
- Broken Records at the OldFruitmarket Glasgow January 2011

Background information
- Origin: Edinburgh, Scotland
- Genres: Alternative rock; folk rock; indie rock; art rock
- Years active: 2006–present
- Labels: 4AD
- Members: Jamie Sutherland; Rory Sutherland; Ian Turnbull; Andy Keeney; Craig Ross
- Past members: Arne Kolb; David Fothergill; Dave Smith; Stephen Gillon; AdMack
- Website: brokenrecordsband.com

Broken Records are a band from Edinburgh, Scotland, which formed in December 2006. The band are signed to 4AD and released their debut album, Until the Earth Begins to Part, in June 2009. Their second album Let Me Come Home was released in October 2010, and their third Weights and Pulleys in May 2014.

== History ==
The band was originally a three-piece comprising Jamie Sutherland, brother Rory Sutherland (violin, guitar and accordion), and Ian Turnbull (guitar, piano and accordion). After a few performances they added Arne Kolb (cello), Dave Smith (piano, trumpet), Andrew Keeney (drums), and David Fothergill (bass). Broken Records played 60 gigs in 2007 and recorded a session for BBC Radio 1 at the Maida Vale studios. They played a well-received set at T in the Park's T Break stage in 2007 and went on to play two sets at the 2008 Connect Festival, including a well-attended headlining set at the Your Sound bandstand.

Broken Records released three singles on three different record labels throughout 2008: "If the News Makes You Sad, Don't Watch It" on Young Turks in April, "Slow Parade" on Label Fandango in August, and "Lies" on Distiller Records in November.

Tipped for big things by publications such as The Skinny, NME and Q, the band signed a deal with the independent record label 4AD, with whom they released their debut album Until the Earth Begins to Part on 1 June 2009. The album has been described by frontman Jamie Sutherland as "based around all the shit things men do."

Broken Records released a digital EP, entitled Out on the Water, on 2 November 2009. The release contains songs recorded before Until the Earth Begins to Part. The band covered The Beatles' song "Oh! Darling" for Mojo Magazine's Abbey Road Now!, a free cover-mounted CD given away with the October 2009 issue of the magazine.

In August 2010, 4AD announced the release of the band's second album, entitled Let Me Come Home, released on 25 October 2010. The album was produced by Tony Doogan, and features artwork by renowned graphic artist Vaughan Oliver. Frontman Jamie Sutherland said of the album's inspiration:

An idea started to form about the direction of the new record based on several films and albums that I became gradually obsessed with at that time. Watching the widescreen emptiness of films Badlands, Rumble Fish and East of Eden, as well as records such as Bruce Springsteen's Nebraska, Nick Cave's Murder Ballads, Calexico's Feast of Wire and R.E.M.'s early back catalogue all became a strong influence on the direction of the new songs. It was also during this time that the lyrical theme of the record started to take shape, thinking about what was going on around me in the form of fears and concerns over making relationships work, and a need for security.

In August, the band also announced the shift from being a seven-piece band to a six-piece for live touring with the departure of Arne and Gill, and the introduction of new member, Craig Ross, taking up bass and guitar duties.

== Sound ==
Use of the violin, cello, and accordion gives them a distinctly Scottish edge and their faster numbers have been known to provoke ceilidh dancing at gigs. The NME branded them the Scottish Arcade Fire, although this is an accolade previously bestowed on My Latest Novel. The band, who swap instruments when performing live, have received numerous comparisons to Arcade Fire, and have also been compared to The Verve and The Levellers. They were described by NME in 2008 as "one of the country's most exciting new bands." Their album 2014 Weights and Pulleys was described as "skilfull (sic) songwriting, immaculately executed, consistently excellent." by Kate Travers for The Line of Best Fit. Their live shows have been described as eliciting an "ecstatic reaction" and "crack[ing] open the atmosphere and turn[ing] simple enjoyment into euphoria." by Will Fitzpatrick for The Skinny.

== Discography ==
=== Studio albums ===
- Until the Earth Begins to Part (2009)
- Let Me Come Home (2010)
- Weights & Pulleys (2014)
- What We Might Know (2018)

=== EPs ===
- Out on the Water (2009)
- Lies (2010)
- Toska (2014)

=== Singles ===
- "If the News Makes You Sad, Don't Watch It" (Young Turks, YT012), 14 April 2008
  1. "If the News Makes You Sad, Don't Watch It"
  2. "Lessons Never Learned"
- "Slow Parade" (Label Fandango, GALLAGOS022), 18 August 2008
  1. "Slow Parade"
  2. "The Problem with Remembering"
- "Lies" (Distiller Records, DTIL 006), 3 November 2008
  1. "Lies"
  2. "Travelling Songs"
- "Until the Earth Begins to Part" (4AD, AD 2909), 11 May 2009
  1. "Until the Earth Begins to Part"
  2. "And They All Fell Into the Sea"
- "A Good Reason" (4AD), September 2009
  1. "A Good Reason"
- "Lies" iTunes reissue (4AD), 9 March 2010
  1. "Lies"
  2. "Travelling Songs"
  3. "Lies" (music video)
- "A Leaving Song" free digital download (4AD), 13 August 2010
  1. "A Leaving Song"
- "A Darkness Rises Up" digital download (4AD), 18 October 2010
