= Higelin =

Higelin is a surname. Notable people with the surname include:

- Alphonse Higelin (1897–1981), French gymnast and Olympian
- Arthur Higelin (born 1966), better known Arthur H, French songwriter, singer and pianist
- Izïa Higelin (born 1990), better known as Izïa, French rock singer and guitarist
- Jacques Higelin (1940–2018), French singer
- Kên Higelin (born 1972), French stage and film actor, theatre director and music video director
