= Ian Caple =

- Born: Ian Caple
- Origin: London, England
- Occupations: Recording engineer, record producer, programmer, mixer
- Years active: 1979–present
- Website: www.flammusic.com

Ian Caple is an English recording engineer, record producer, programmer and mixer.

== History ==
Caple's career began at EMI Music in 1979. After training at Abbey Road Studios, he became an engineer at EMI's KPM studios in Denmark Street London. He worked with Shriekback on their early albums at KPM as well as Kate Bush Simple Minds and Adam & The Ants. He left in 1984 to work as a freelance engineer/producer/programmer and mixer.

Through the 1980s he worked again with Shriekback as well as many other Indie artists including the Pale Fountains, Jah Wobble, The Colourfield, Julian Cope, The Mekons, The Chameleons, The Wolfhounds, and East Village

In 1989, he produced The Mekons Rock 'n Roll album which features in Pitchfork's top 100 albums of the '80s and is number 272 in Spin Magazine's ' 300 best albums of the past 30 years '

In the early 1990s, he co - produced the debut album for Tindersticks. The album – Tindersticks, was released in 1993 and was voted album of the year by Melody Maker magazine. He went on to work with them for the next 16 years, either recording, co-producing or mixing 14 albums and movie soundtracks. The second Tindersticks album Tindersticks was recorded at Conny Plank's studio In Cologne and at Abbey Road Studios, it was released in 1995 and reached number 13 in the UK Albums Chart.

In 1995 he was asked to remix the single "Black Steel" for Tricky and this led to a long-term collaboration with the artist. Caple programmed & mixed more singles with Tricky including Hell is round the corner The Hell EP which went to number 12 in the UK singles chart and with Tricky remixed "where do we go from here" by Yoko Ono for her album Rising Remixes. He also recorded and mixed Tricky's Nearly God album, featuring guest vocals from Terry Hall of The Specials, Alison Moyet, Neneh Cherry, Björk and Martina Topley-Bird. Soon after, he went to Jamaica with Tricky to record, program and mix the next album – Pre-Millennium Tension which went on to sell 450,000 copies worldwide and was featured in Q magazine's list of the "50 heaviest albums of all time"

He worked again with Tricky in 2012 when he mixed his 9th studio album False Idols it reached number 15 in the UK Indie albums chart and number 5 in the US Dance/Electronic albums chart

In 1996 he recorded and co-produced the debut album Attack of the Grey Lantern by Mansun which spent 19 weeks in the UK Albums Chart and reached Number One in February 1997, selling over 100,000 copies in the UK and achieving Gold status. It was ranked at number 12 in Melody Maker's ' best 50 albums of the year 1997 ' Two singles from the album, "Stripper Vicar" and "Wide Open Space" made the UK top 40 singles chart.

In 1997 he produced the Fantaisie militaire album for Alain Bashung in France. It was released in 1998 and went to number one in the French albums chart and spent 36 weeks in the top 50 It went on to be certified Platinum, winning the best album of the year at the 1999 Victoires de la musique – the French music awards, and in 2005 it received the award for the best album of the past 20 years at Victoires de la musique. In 2010 Rolling Stone magazine voted it number 9 in the 100 best French rock albums of all time

In 1999 and 2000, he produced and mixed the album, Bulle(s), for the French band Loeil.

In 2000 he produced the debut album for Irish rock band JJ72 which reached number 16 in the UK albums chart and spent 35 weeks in the Irish album chart, peaking at number 7, it has gone on to sell over 500,000 copies worldwide and has achieved Gold status in the UK. Also in 2000 he mixed the album Gratte Poil for French band Tetes Raides, it spent 61 weeks in the French album charts, reaching number 23 and achieved Gold status

In 2001, he mixed the album L'Absente for French composer Yann Tiersen which spent 41 weeks in the French album charts, reaching number 8 it sold over 100,000 copies in France and went on to sell 250,000 copies worldwide also in 2001 he produced tracks on the Lifelines album for A-ha. It went to number one in Germany and Norway, achieving Gold status.

In 2008, he mixed the debut album for Greek singer-songwriter Monika Christodoulou (Monika), it sold over 30,000 copies in Greece, achieving Platinum status.

In 2009, he produced the Where the Oceans End album for French band Cocoon. It was released in 2010 and spent 49 weeks in French album charts, peaking at number 6 selling over 100,000 copies and achieving platinum status Also in 2009 he produced the debut album – Until the Earth Begins to Part for Scottish indie band Broken Records

In 2006, he mixed the album Amor Doloroso for French star Jacques Higelin, In 2010 he mixed the next Jacques Higelin album Coup de Foudre which spent 48 weeks in the French album charts and peaked at number 2. it sold over 50,000 copies and achieved Gold status Also in 2010 he recorded and mixed Higelin's live album – Paris/Zenith 2010.

In 2012, he mixed the album Le dernier présent for French singer-songwriter Alexis HK it reached number 22 in the French album chart

In 2013, he recorded and co produced Emilie Simon's album Mue. It was released in 2014 and went to number 16 in the French album chart in 2014 he recorded and mixed the debut album by Danish singer/songwriter Broken Twin which reached number 8 in the Danish album charts in 2016 he mixed the last Jacques Higelin album 75 which spent 12 weeks in the French album charts and reached number 6

In 2015, he produced the debut album Too Many Gods for English rock band Cats in Space the success of the album led to him producing the second one Scarecrow in 2017 mixing the next one, Day Trip To Narnia & co producing the 2020 album Atlantis & the latest one Kickstart The Sun in 2022

In 2018, he produced the album Ceux Qui Dorment Dans La Poussière with French artist and songwriter David Assaraf. It was recorded in Paris at Motorbass Studio and featured Matthieu Chedid on vocals and guitar

In 2020 he mixed Tricky's album Fall to Pieces it reached number 3 in the UK independent charts

In 2021 he mixed the 'Pure Heart' EP & 'Forever I Wait' album for Martina Topley-Bird featuring collaborations with Robert Del Naja of Massive Attack

== Selected discography ==
- Mansun – Attack of the Grey Lantern and singles including: "Taxloss" and "Wide Open Space"
- JJ72 – JJ72
- Tricky – Pre-Millennium Tension, Nearly God, False Idols, Fall to Pieces and singles including: "Black Steel", "Makes Me Wanna Die", "Christiansands", "Tricky Kid", "Pumpkin", "Hell is Round the Corner ( The Hell EP), poems, nothings changed.
- Starving Souls (Tricky ) - I be The Prophet
- Martina Topley-Bird - Pure Heart EP & Forever I Wait album
- Tindersticks – 14 albums and 25 singles 1992–2008
- Tindersticks - Claire Denis Film Scores 1996-2009
- Broken Records – Until the Earth Begins to Part
- The Chameleons - What Does Anything Mean? Basically
- Pale Fountains – From Across the Kitchen Table (engineer)
- A-ha - Lifelines (producer)
- Screaming Blue Messiahs - Bikini Red (engineer)
- The Damned - Not of This Earth (engineer)
- Compulsion - Comforter
- Shriekback – Care, Tench, Jam Science, The Infinite, Sacred City, Oil & Gold, Having a Moment, Without Real String or Fish, New Album (2017) and singles inc. "My Spine is the Bass Line", "Lined Up"
- The Mekons – Honky Tonkin', Curse of the Mekons, The Mekons Rock 'n Roll, Fun '90, Natural, Heaven & Hell, Ancient & Modern
- Suede – Sci Fi Lullabies
- The Boo Radleys - Kingsize
- Spiritualized - Anyway That You Want Me Remix
- Faithless - Don't Leave Remix
- Simple Minds - Seeing Out The Angel Remix
- Monika Christodoulou (Greece) - Avatar
- Our Broken Garden (Denmark) – When your blackening shows and The Golden Sea
- The Creatures – Turn It On and Prettiest Thing
- David Bridie (Australia) – Hotel Radio, Act of Free Choice and The Wisdom Line (2018)
- Stina Nordenstam (Sweden) - People Are Strange
- Broken Twin (Denmark) – May
- Cats In Space - Too Many Gods, Scarecrow, Day Trip to Narnia, Cats Alive !, Atlantis, Diamonds, Kickstart The Sun (new 2022 album)

French albums:

- Alain Bashung – Fantaisie militaire
- Cocoon – Where the oceans end
- Yann Tiersen – L'Absente
- Tetes Raides – Gratte Poil
- Thomas Fersen - Triplex
- Autour De Lucie – Faux mouvement
- The Fitzcarraldo Sessions - We Hear Voices
- Émilie Simon – Mue
- Jeanne Balibar - Paramour
- Kat Onoma – Kat Onoma
- Jacques Higelin – Amour Doloroso, Coup de Foudre, Paris Zenith Live & Higelin 75
- A Singer Must Die – Venus Parade and More Songs Beyond Love
- Santa Cruz – Now & Here (2017)
- Loeil – Bulle(s)
- David Assaraf - Ceux Qui Dorment Dans La Poussière
- Thomas Monica - Le Paradoxe De L'Utah album (2019) & Ulysse EP (2021)
- Bleu Lune - Trop Tard Pour Le Moment EP (2021)
