= Distractions (Tindersticks album) =

Studio album by Tindersticks
- Released: 19 February 2021
- Length: 46:46
- Label: City Slang

Tindersticks chronology
| No Treasure but Hope (2019) | Distractions (2021) | Soft Tissue (2024) |

Professional ratings
Aggregate scores
| Source | Rating |
|---|---|
| AnyDecentMusic? | 7.5/10 |
| Metacritic | 78/100 |
Review scores
| Source | Rating |
| AllMusic | 4/5 stars |
| MusicOMH | 4.5/5 stars |
| Uncut | 4/5 stars |

Distractions is the thirteenth studio album by English alternative rock band Tindersticks. It was released on 19 February 2021 by City Slang.

== Critical reception ==
Distractions was met with "generally favorable" reviews from critics. At Metacritic, which assigns a weighted average rating out of 100 to reviews from mainstream publications, this release received an average score of 78 based on 4 reviews. AnyDecentMusic? gave the release a 7.5 out of 10 based on a critical consensus of 7 reviews.

In a review for AllMusic, Mark Deming wrote: "While a string quartet appears on two tracks, much of Distractions was crafted from simple guitar and keyboard figures, drum machines, and loops, with a vocal sample of Staples providing the framework of the opening track, "Man Alone (Can't Stop the Fadin')." The gentle strength of Staples' deep, whispery vocals takes up even more space than usual on these sessions, and on many tracks, it has little more than elemental guitar and keyboard lines to accompany it."

== Track listing ==
Distractions track listing
| No. | Title | Writer(s) | Original artist(s) | Length |
|---|---|---|---|---|
| 1. | "Man Alone (Can't Stop the Fadin')" | Stuart Staples | | 11:07 |
| 2. | "I Imagine You" | Staples; Dan McKinna | | 5:36 |
| 3. | "A Man Needs a Maid" | Neil Young | Neil Young | 4:42 |
| 4. | "Lady with the Braid" | Dory Previn | Dory Previn | 6:59 |
| 5. | "You'll Have to Scream Louder" | Daniel Treacy | Television Personalities | 5:13 |
| 6. | "Tue-Moi" | McKinna; Staples | | 3:33 |
| 7. | "The Bough Bends" | Stuart Staples | | 9:36 |

== Charts ==
Chart performance for Distractions
| Chart (2021) | Peak position |
|---|---|
| Austrian Albums (Ö3 Austria) | 10 |
| Belgian Albums (Ultratop Flanders) | 15 |
| Belgian Albums (Ultratop Wallonia) | 80 |
| French Albums (SNEP) | 131 |
| Portuguese Albums (AFP) | 2 |
| Scottish Albums (OCC) | 11 |
| Swiss Albums (Schweizer Hitparade) | 11 |
| UK Independent Albums (OCC) | 6 |
