= Trouble Every Day (soundtrack) =

Soundtrack album by Tindersticks
- Released: 1 October 2001
- Genre: Soundtrack, instrumental rock, chamber pop
- Label: Beggars Banquet
- Producer: Tindersticks

Tindersticks chronology
Can Our Love... (2001)	Trouble Every Day (2001)	Waiting for the Moon (2003)

Professional ratings
Review scores
Source	Rating
Allmusic	link
NME	link

Trouble Every Day is the name of Tindersticks' soundtrack to French director Claire Denis's 2001 film Trouble Every Day.

The album charted in SNEP, French official albums chart, entering the chart at number 133 and staying for one week.

== Track listing ==
1. "Opening Titles"
2. "Dream"
3. "Houses"
4. "Maid Theme 1"
5. "Room 321"
6. "Computer"
7. "Notre Dame"
8. "Killing Theme"
9. "Taxi to Coré"
10. "Coré on Stairs/Love Theme"
11. "Maid Theme (End)"
12. "Closing Titles"
13. "Killing Theme (Alternative version)"
14. "Trouble Every Day"
