= Falling Down a Mountain =

Studio album by Tindersticks
- Released: 25 January 2010
- Recorded: Le Chien Chanceaux, France and ICP Studios, Brussels; May–July 2009
- Genre: Chamber pop
- Length: 44:37
- Labels: 4AD (UK & Europe); Constellation Records (US)
- Producer: Stuart A. Staples

Tindersticks chronology
The Hungry Saw (2008)	Falling Down a Mountain (2010)	Claire Denis Film Scores 1996–2009 (2011)

Falling Down a Mountain is the eighth studio album by English rock band Tindersticks. It was released on 25 January 2010 in Europe through 4AD/Constellation Records, and on 16 February 2010 in the United States. The album peaked at number two in Greece, and achieved modest chart placings in other European countries.

== Critical reception ==
Professional ratings
Aggregate scores
Source	Rating
Metacritic	76/100
Review scores
Source	Rating
AllMusic	4/5 stars
Drowned in Sound	7/10
Mojo	4/5 stars
NME	6/10 stars
Pitchfork	7.0/10
PopMatters	5/10 stars
Q	3/5 stars
Spin	7/10 stars
Uncut	4/5 stars

Falling Down a Mountain was met with "generally favorable" reviews from critics. At Metacritic, which assigns a weighted average rating out of 100 to reviews from mainstream publications, this release received an average score of 76, based on 21 reviews.

Drowned in Sound felt that Tindersticks have "created a record that certainly rivals, if not betters any of its three predecessors from the past decade". Pitchfork summed up the record by saying "it leaves a very hazy, almost spectral impression when it ends. But it's also warm and in some ways comforting, and it improves the more you listen to it and tease out the details in the songs." BBC Music described the album as "the sound of a band rediscovering themselves" and Uncut had a similar view, saying Tindersticks sounded like "a band with restored self-belief, again loving doing what they do better than anyone else". AllMusic said "Falling Down a Mountain isn't exactly a major reinvention, but it does back up the golden-hued sky gracing its cover with some of their most upbeat and optimistic songs to date". NME was more measured, describing the album as "a dislocated creature" but "the moments of oddness whetted our palette for more." PopMatters was equally unimpressed, calling it "the sound of Tindersticks going through the motions".

In 2011 it was awarded a silver certification from the Independent Music Companies Association which indicated sales of at least 20,000 copies throughout Europe.

== Track listing ==
All songs written and composed by Stuart Staples except where indicated.

1. "Falling Down a Mountain" – 6:33
2. "Keep You Beautiful" – 3:23
3. "Harmony Around My Table" – 5:06
4. "Peanuts" (with Mary Margaret O'Hara) – 4:37
5. "She Rode Me Down" – 3:18
6. "Hubbards Hills" (Dan McKinna) – 3:04
7. "Black Smoke" – 3:43
8. "No Place So Alone" – 3:12
9. "Factory Girls" – 5:55
10. "Piano Music" – 5:46

== Personnel ==
- Stuart Staples – lead vocals, acoustic guitar
- David Boulter – keyboards, percussion
- Neil Fraser – guitar
- Dan McKinna – bass, vocals
- Terry Edwards – trumpet
- Earl Harvin – drums
- David Kitt – guitar, vocals

== Charts ==
Chart (2010)	Peak position
Belgian Albums (Ultratop Flanders)	21
Belgian Albums (Ultratop Wallonia)	56
Danish Albums (Hitlisten)	40
Dutch Albums (Album Top 100)	55
French Albums (SNEP)	52
German Albums (Offizielle Top 100)	87
Greek Albums (IFPI Greece)	2
Irish Albums (IRMA)	44
Scottish Albums (Official Charts)	99
Swiss Albums (Schweizer Hitparade)	77
UK Albums (Official Charts)	90
UK Independent Albums (Official Charts)	13
