= Nénette et Boni (soundtrack) =

Soundtrack album by Tindersticks
- Released: 1996
- Genre: Easy listening
- Length: 37:18
- Label: This Way Up/Island
- Producer: Ian Caple

Tindersticks chronology
| Tindersticks (1995) | Nénette et Boni (1996) | Curtains (1997) |

Professional ratings
Review scores
| Source | Rating |
|---|---|
| AllMusic | 3/5 stars |
| Pitchfork | 7.8/10 |

Nénette et Boni is the name of Tindersticks' soundtrack album to the 1996 Claire Denis film Nénette et Boni.

All of the tracks are instrumentals, with the exception of "Petites Gouttes d'Eau", which is a retitled version of "Tiny Tears", from the band's second album.

== Track listing ==
1. "Ma sœur" – 2:48
2. "La passerelle" – 4:17
3. "Les gâteaux" – 1:00
4. "Camions" – 2:50
5. "Nénette est là" – 1:32
6. "Petites chiennes" – 1:59
7. "Nosfératu" – 1:11
8. "Petites gouttes d’eau" – 5:25
9. "Les cannes à pêche" – 2:49
10. "La mort de Félix" – 1:31
11. "Nénette s’en va" – 2:19
12. "Les bébés" – 1:31
13. "Les fleurs" – 1:06
14. "Rhumba" – 6:52
