= Tindersticks =

English rock band

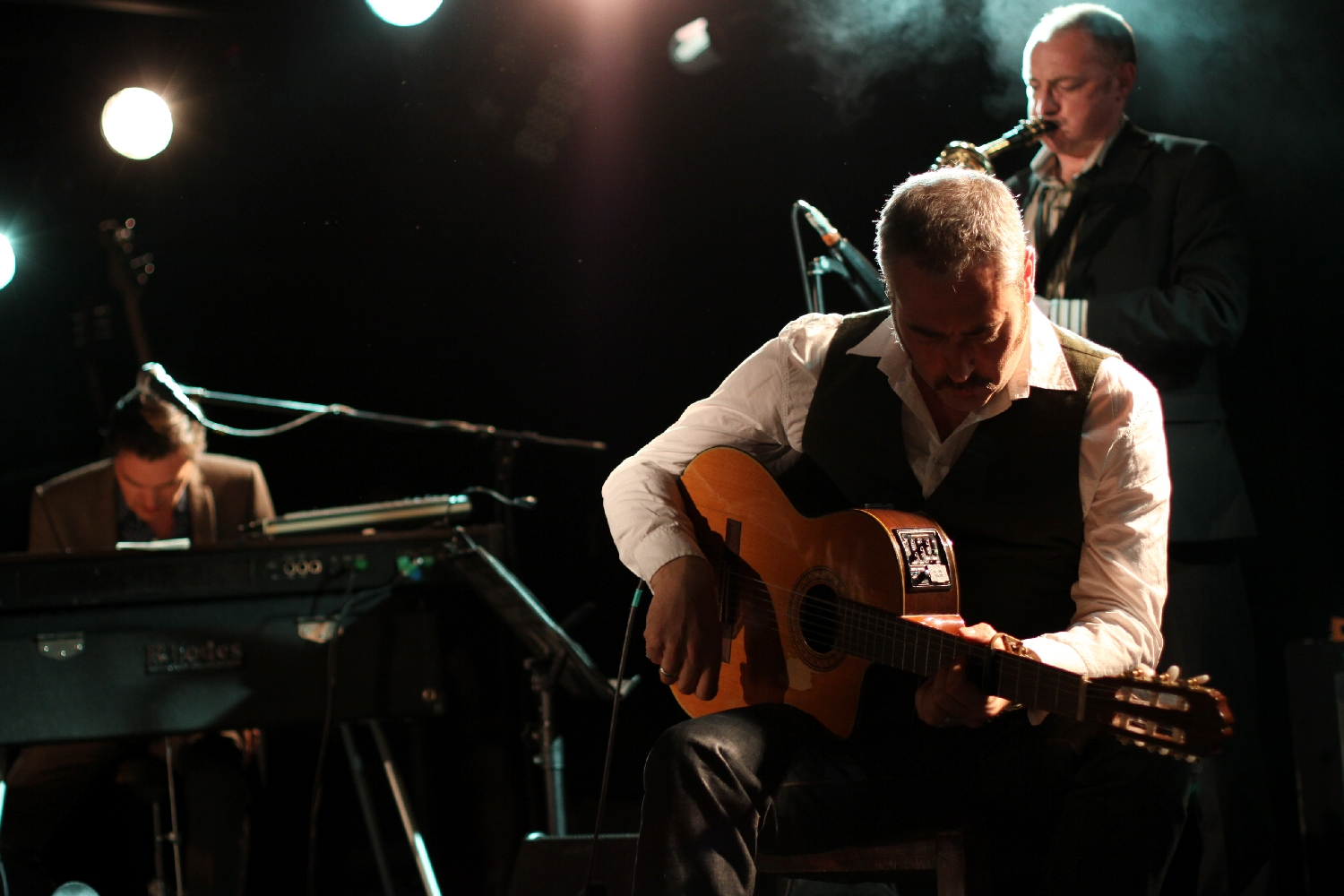
- Tindersticks at A38, 12 May 2012

Background information
- Origin: Nottingham, England
- Genres: Indie rock; chamber pop
- Years active: 1992–present
- Labels: This Way Up, Island, Beggars Banquet, 4AD, Constellation Records, Lucky Dog, City Slang
- Members: Stuart Staples; David Leonard Boulter; Neil Fraser; Dan McKinna; Earl Harvin
- Past members: Dickon Hinchliffe; Al Macaulay; Mark Colwill; Thomas Belhom; David Kitt
- Website: www.tindersticks.co.uk

Tindersticks are an English alternative rock band formed in Nottingham in 1992. They released six albums before singer Stuart A. Staples embarked on a solo career. The band reunited briefly in 2006 and more permanently the following year. The band recorded several film soundtracks, and have a long-standing collaboration with French director Claire Denis.

== History ==
After the closure of Marc Riley's In-Tape Records, the band Asphalt Ribbons were left without a record label. They reformed as Tindersticks in Nottingham in 1992. They were named so after singer Stuart Staples discovered a box of German matches on a Greek beach. The lineup consisted of Stuart Staples (vocals), Dave Boulter (keyboards), Neil Fraser (guitar), Dickon Hinchliffe (violin), Al Macauley (drums), and Mark Colwill (bass). That same year, the band moved from Nottingham to London. They formed their own label Tippy Toe Records to release their first single, "Patchwork", in November 1992. Their first gig in London was at the Islington Powerhaus in December 1992.

Their self-titled first and second albums established their signature sound and received widespread critical acclaim. Their live performances, often augmented by large string sections and even, on occasion, a full orchestra, were well received. The live album The Bloomsbury Theatre 12.3.95 is a recording of one such concert. By the time of the third album, Curtains, however, it was clear that a change of direction was called for.

The fourth album, Simple Pleasure, lived up to its title with a series of snappy, direct songs influenced by soul music. The female backing vocals on several tracks, and the respectful cover of Odyssey's "If You're Looking for a Way Out", signalled the band's wish to move towards lighter, more soulful material. However, the inner sleeve's documentation of the number of takes each track went through was evidence that the band continued to adopt a painstaking approach to recording.

The fifth album, Can Our Love..., continued the band's soulful direction, in particular evidence on the tender "Sweet Release" and in the nod to The Chi-Lites in the title of "Chilitetime".

The sixth album, Waiting for the Moon, was more stripped down and introspective in nature, particularly on the harrowing "4.48 Psychosis" (based on the play of the same name by the British playwright Sarah Kane) and "Sometimes It Hurts". Only the bouncy "Just a Dog" lightened the otherwise melancholy mood of the album.

In 2005, Staples embarked on a solo career and there was resultant speculation that the band had split. During this period, Staples produced two solo albums, Lucky Dog Recordings 03-04 and Leaving Songs. The title of the second album, and Staples' notes on it, indicated that change was in the air: "These are songs written on the verge of leaving the things I loved and stepping into a new unknown life, both musically and personally. I was always aware that these songs were the end of something, a kind of closing a circle of a way of writing that I started so long ago and I knew I had to move on from."

In September 2006, the band played a one-off concert at London's Barbican Centre, performing their second album in full with a nine-member string section and two brass players, including former collaborator Terry Edwards on trumpet.

Staples later acknowledged that this show, while being a happy triumph, was also "tinged with sadness of the knowledge that the six of us had made all the new music we were going to make together." However, it also rekindled his determination to make a new album.

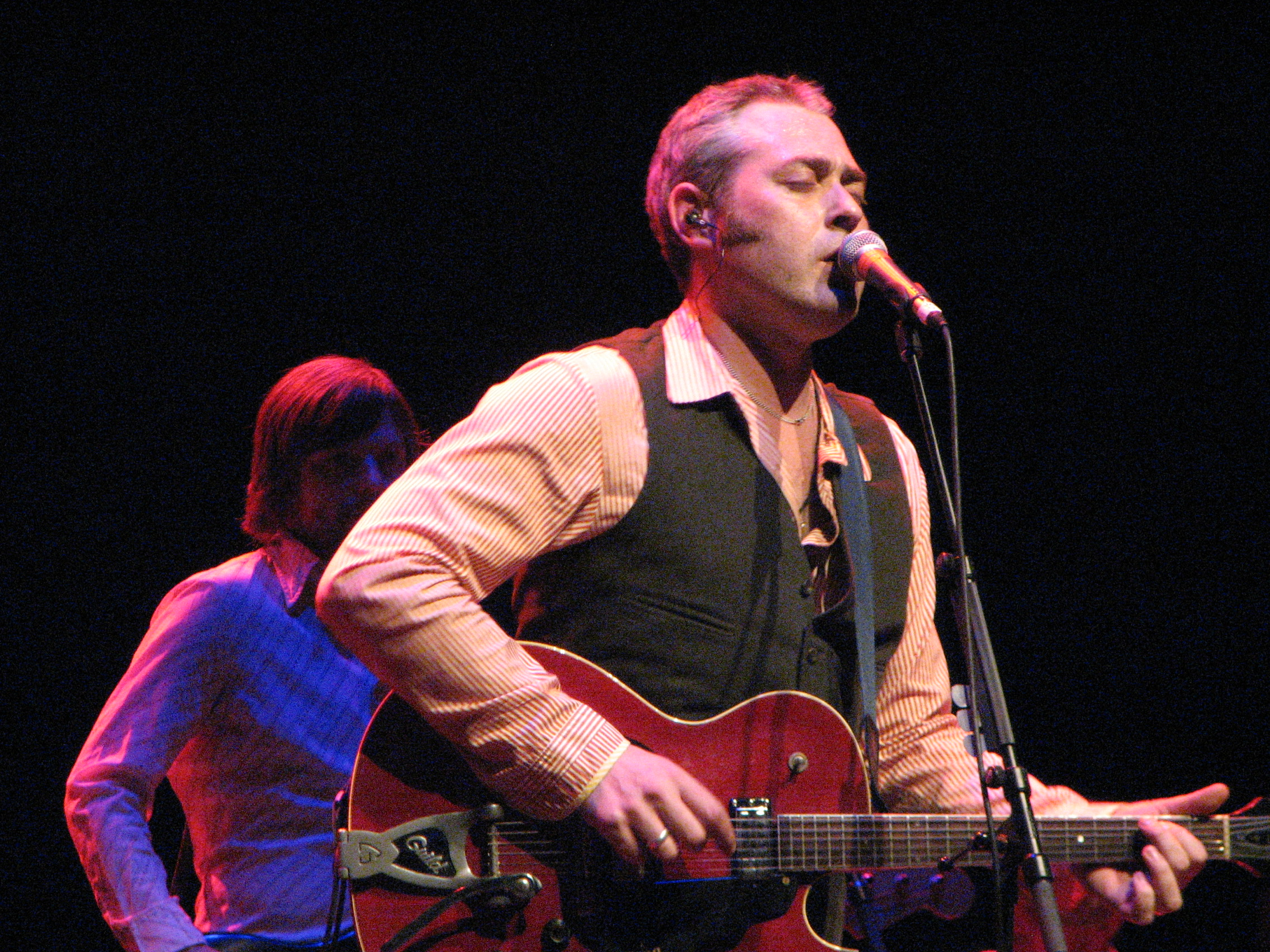
Tindersticks at the Royal Festival Hall, 3 May 2008

In 2007, a stripped-down line-up of three of the original band, Staples, Boulter and Fraser, spent time writing and recording in a newly equipped studio in Limousin, France. They were joined by Thomas Belhom on drums and Dan McKinna on bass, with Ian Caple engineering. The resulting album, The Hungry Saw, was released on Beggars Banquet in April 2008. Tindersticks played a number of other European dates during the summer festival season and also announced a winter 2008 European tour.

In 2010, the eighth studio album Falling Down a Mountain was released on 4AD/Constellation Records with a changed band line-up, with Earl Harvin replacing Belhom on drums and David Kitt, a solo artist in his own right, joining the band on guitar and vocals.

The group's ninth studio album The Something Rain was released in February 2012. The following tours in spring, summer (festival concerts) and autumn, showed the band now touring in their again reduced 5-member core line-up (Stuart Staples, David Boulter, Neil Fraser, Dan McKinna and Earl Harvin), supported at selected gigs by Terry Edwards on horns.

In October 2013, after missing the band's 20th anniversary the years before, the band released their tenth studio album, the retrospective Across Six Leap Years, containing ten re-recorded songs from their back-catalog and from Stuart A. Staples solo album period. In the autumn of 2013 they toured several European capital cities in their Across Six Leap Years anniversary tour, supported by Terry Edwards on saxophone and horns and Gina Foster on backing vocals.

In 2016 they released their eleventh studio album The Waiting Room, followed by an extensive tour in February to May 2016.

Their 12th studio album, No Treasure But Hope, was released in later 2019 to positive reviews, with a tour planned for 2020. Ahead of these tour dates, the band released the four-song See My Girls EP along with a video for the title track.

U.S. and European tour dates were cancelled due to the COVID-19 pandemic, which is why the core band focused on working on a new album during 2020. In January 2021, the band announced their thirteenth regular album Distractions, which was released on 19 February and charted at number 15 in the Offizielle Deutsche Charts' Album Top 100 in Germany. Their fourteenth album, Soft Tissue, was released on 10 September 2024.

== Soundtrack work ==
- As well as their thirteen regular studio albums, the band has composed and recorded the music for seven films by the French director Claire Denis: Nénette et Boni, Trouble Every Day, 35 Shots of Rum, White Material, Les Salauds, Both Sides of the Blade, and Stars at Noon. Band members Stuart A. Staples and Dickon Hinchliffe have also composed soundtracks for other Denis films (The Intruder and High Life by Staples, and Friday Night by Hinchliffe). The end-titles song in High Life, "Willow", features vocals by British actor Robert Pattinson, and is therefore credited to "Tindersticks feat. Robert Pattinson".
- Band members Stuart Staples and Dan McKinna composed the accompanying orchestral soundscape to the Belgian In Flanders Fields Museum. The six-part work, played on a continuous loop in varying sections of the museum was released as the Tindersticks album Ypres in 2014.
- Tindersticks recorded a cover version of the Four Tops song, "What Is a Man", for the theme to the British TV series The Sins. This was released as a non-album single
- The Tindersticks song "Tiny Tears" was featured prominently in the Season 1 episode "Isabella" of HBO's The Sopranos. Sections from a 14-minute instrumental mix of "Running Wild" were the end credits music for the penultimate episode of the series, "The Blue Comet." The same track was used repeatedly in Alex Gibney's 2024 documentary on series creator David Chase.
- In the season one finale of Brotherhood, "El Diablo En El Ojo" is used twice.
- In 2009, Tindersticks' "The Organist Entertains" was featured in the closing credits of an episode of the HBO series Eastbound & Down. "Hubbards Hill" was used in the closing credits of another episode, "Chapter 9", in 2010.
- The Tindersticks song "Cherry Blossoms" was featured in the 2009 film Unmade Beds.
- Dickon Hinchliffe has composed film music since 2002, and has been a full-time composer in this field since his departure from Tindersticks. Among his work are the soundtracks to Niall Johnson's Keeping Mum (2005), Joel Hopkins' Last Chance Harvey (2008), Sophie Barthes' Cold Souls (2009), James Marsh's Red Riding: In the Year of Our Lord 1980 (2009), Project Nim (2011), and Shadow Dancer; and Debra Granik's Oscar-nominated film Winter's Bone (2010), Lennon Naked (2010), Passion Play (2011), The Fields (2011), Rampart (2011), and Hit & Miss (2012), and more recently Locke (2013), Out of the Furnace (2013), series 3 of Peaky Blinders (2016), and Leave No Trace (2018).

== Musical style ==
Their sound is characterised by orchestral backing, lounge jazz and soul; the orchestrations of multi-instrumentalist Dickon Hinchliffe (who left the band in 2006) and the baritone of lead vocalist Stuart A. Staples are the band's hallmarks. Tindersticks augment their instrumentation with Rhodes piano, glockenspiel, vibraphone, violin, trumpet, trombone, clarinet, bassoon and Hammond organ.

== Discography ==
=== Studio albums ===
List of studio albums, with selected chart positions
Title and details	Peak chart positions											
Title and details	UK	BEL (FL)	BEL (WA)	DEN	FRA	NLD	NOR	POR	SPA	SWE	SWI	US
Tindersticks: a.k.a. First Album; Year released: 1993; Record label: UK: This Way Up / US: Bar/None	56	—	—	—	—	—	—	—	—	—	—	—
Tindersticks: a.k.a. Second Album; Year released: 1995; Record label: UK: This Way Up / US: Bar/None	13	—	—	—	—	—	—	—	—	—	—	—
Curtains: Year released: 1997; Record label: This Way Up	37	26	—	—	34	—	33	—	—	41	—	—
Simple Pleasure: Year released: 1999; Record label: Island Records	36	37	—	—	71	—	33	—	—	43	—	—
Can Our Love...: Year released: 2001; Record label: Beggars Banquet	47	—	—	—	76	—	—	—	—	—	—	—
Waiting for the Moon: Year released: 2003; Record label: Beggars Banquet	76	32	—	—	77	89	—	11	—	—	—	—
The Hungry Saw: Year released: 2008; Record label: Beggars Banquet Constellation Records	81	14	53	24	61	44	—	—	—	—	—	—
Falling Down a Mountain: Year released: 2010; Record label: 4AD/Constellation Records	90	21	56	40	52	55	—	—	—	—	77	—
The Something Rain: Year released: 2012; Record label: Lucky Dog/City Slang/Constellation	59	21	48	20	37	25	—	22	70	51	37	—
Across Six Leap Years: Year released: 2013; Record label: Lucky Dog/City Slang/Constellation	—	26	76	—	87	50	—	22	—	—	96	—
The Waiting Room: Year released: 2016; Record label: Lucky Dog/City Slang	71	13	44	—	49	24	—	15	—	—	30	—
No Treasure but Hope: Year released: 2019; Record label: Lucky Dog/City Slang	—	39	107	—	64	99	—	10	66	—	53	—
Distractions: Year released: 2021; City Slang	—	15	80	—	131	—	—	2	—	—	11	—
Soft Tissue: Year released: 2024; City Slang	—	36	62	—	—	—	—	14	—	—	29	—
Dog Roses: Year released: 2027; City Slang												

=== Original soundtracks ===
- Nénette et Boni (This Way Up/Island, 1996) — UK No. 104
- Trouble Every Day (Beggars Banquet, 2001)
- 35 Rhums / 35 Shots of Rum (2008)
- White Material (2010)
- Les Salauds (Lucky Dog/Naive, 2013)
- Ypres (Lucky Dog/City Slang, 2014)
- Minute Bodies: The Intimate World Of F. Percy Smith (Lucky Dog/City Slang, 2017)
- Adolescents (2019 - unreleased until now in any form)
- Stars at Noon (2022 - digital release only)
- 35 Rhums (2023 - digital re-release)
- Avec Amour Et Acharnement (2023 aka Both Sides of the Blade - digital release only)
- White Material (2023 - digital re-release)

=== Singles ===
- "Patchwork" (Tippy Toe Records, November 1992)
- "Marbles" (Tippy Toe/Che Records, March 1993)
- "A Marriage Made in Heaven" (Rough Trade Singles Club, March 1993)
- "Unwired EP" (Domino, July 1993)
- "City Sickness" (This Way Up Records, September 1993)
- "Marbles" (No.6 Records, September 1993)
- "We Have All the Time in the World" (Clawfist Singles Club, October 1993)
- "Live in Berlin" (Tippy Toe/This Way Up, October 1993)
- "Kathleen" (This Way Up, January 1994) — UK No. 61
- "No More Affairs" (This Way Up, March 1995) — UK No. 58
- "Plus De Liaisons" (This Way Up, 1995)
- "The Smooth Sounds of Tindersticks" (Sub Pop, June 1995)
- "Travelling Light" (This Way Up, July 1995) — UK No. 51
- "Bathtime" (This Way Up, May 1997) — UK No. 38
- "Rented Rooms" (This Way Up, October 1997) — UK No. 56
- "Can We Start Again?" (Island, August 1999) — UK No. 54
- "What is a Man?" (Beggars Banquet, 2000) — UK No. 90
- "Trouble Every Day" (Beggars Banquet, 2001)
- "Don't Even Go There EP" (Beggars Banquet, 2003)
- "Trojan Horse" (Tippy Toe, 2003)
- "Sometimes It Hurts" (Beggars Banquet, 2003) — UK No. 60
- "My Oblivion" (Beggars Banquet, 2003) — UK No. 82
- "Friday Night" (Lucky Dog, 2005)
- "The Hungry Saw" (Beggars Banquet, 2008)
- "What Are You Fighting For?" (Lucky Dog, 2008 - one sided single)
- "Boobar Come Back to Me" (Lucky Dog, 2008)
- "Black Smoke" (Lucky Dog, 2010)
- "Medicine" (Lucky Dog, 2012)
- "This Fire of Autumn" (Lucky Dog, 2012)
- "Slippin' Shoes" (Lucky Dog, 2012)
- "If You're Looking For A Way Out" (Lucky Dog, 2013)
- "We Are Dreamers!" (City Slang, 2015)
- "Were We Once Lovers?" (City Slang, 2016)
- "How He Entered " (City Slang, 2016)
- "The Amputees" (Lucky Dog, 2019)
- "Willow"(Lucky Dog, 2019)
- "Pinky In The Daylight" (Lucky Dog, 2019)
- "See My Girls" (Lucky Dog, 2020)
- "You'll Have To Scream Louder" (City Slang, 2020)
- "Man Alone (Can't Stop the Fadin')" (City Slang, 2021)
- "Both Sides of the Blade" (City Slang, 2022)
- "New World" (Lucky Dog, 2024)
- "Falling, the Light" (Lucky Dog, 2024)
- "Don't Walk, Run" (Lucky Dog, 2025)

=== Other albums ===
- Amsterdam February 94 (This Way Up, 1994)
- The Bloomsbury Theatre 12.3.95 (This Way Up, October 1995) — UK No. 32
- Marks Moods (Polygram, 1997)
- Donkeys 92-97 (This Way Up/Island, 1998) — UK No. 78
- Live at the Botanique – 9–12 May 2001 (Tippy Toe, 2001)
- Coliseu dos Recreios de Lisboa – 30 October 2001 (Tippy Toe, 2003)
- Working for the Man (Island, 2004)
- BBC Sessions (Island, 2007)
- Live at Glasgow City Halls 5 October 2008 (Lucky Dog, tour only release, 2008)
- Live in London 2010 (Lucky Dog, tour only release, 2010)
- Claire Denis Film Scores 1996–2009 (5 CD/5LP Box Set, 2011)
- Live in San Sebastian 2012 (Lucky Dog, tour only release, 2012)
- Philharmonie de Paris (Lucky Dog, tour only release, 2016)
- Past Imperfect - The Best of Tindersticks '92 - '21 (City Slang, 2022)
- Mayday '22 (Lucky Dog, tour only release, 2024)

=== Solo albums and side projects ===
- Alasdair Macauley - 3head - 3head (Beat (Japan), 2000)
- Alasdair Macauley - 3head - Blackwater (Different Records, 2003)
- Alasdair Macauley - 3head - You Are More Beautiful (Creation Youth, 2025)
- Neil Fraser - The London Dirthole Company - Fool's Errand/Stripshow (7" Vinyl) (Phono Erotic, 2005)
- Terry Edwards & Neil Fraser - Beyond Harlem Nocturne (Sartorial Records, 2015)
- Stuart A. Staples - L'intrus (Original Soundtrack) (Lucky Dog, 2004)
- Stuart A. Staples - Lucky Dog Recordings 03-04 (Lucky Dog, 2005)
- Stuart A. Staples - Leaving Songs (Beggars Banquet, 2006)
- Stuart A. Staples - Souvenir '06 (Tour E.P.) (Lucky Dog, 2006)
- Stuart A. Staples sang on The Secret Place for Yann Tiersen's "Les Retrouvailles" (2006)
- David Boulter & Stuart A. Staples - Songs for the Young at Heart (Rough Trade/City Slang, 2007)
- Stuart A. Staples also sang on This Light Holds So Many Colours for Rodrigo Leão's "A Mãe" (2009)
- Stuart A. Staples - Arrhythmia (City Slang, Lucky Dog, 2018)
- Stuart A. Staples - High Life (Original Soundtrack) (City Slang, Lucky Dog, 2019)
- Stuart A. Staples - Un Beau Soleil Interieur (Original Soundtrack) (City Slang, Lucky Dog, 2023)
- Dickon Hinchliffe - Friday Night (Original Soundtrack) (2002)
- Dickon Hinchliffe - Keeping Mum (Original Soundtrack) (Wrasse Rec, 2006)
- Dickon Hinchliffe - Married Life (Original Soundtrack) (Lakeshore Records, 2008)
- Dickon Hinchliffe, Al Macauley - Last Chance Harvey (Original Soundtrack) (Lakeshore Records, 2008)
- Dickon Hinchliffe - Winter's Bone (Original Soundtrack) (Cinewax, 2010)
- Dickon Hinchliffe - Cold Souls (Music From The Film) (E1 Entertainment, 2010)
- Dickon Hinchliffe - Project Nim (Motion Picture Soundtrack) (Cinewax, 2011)
- Dickon Hinchliffe - Texas Killing Fields (Original Motion Picture Soundtrack) (Pale Blue, 2012)
- Dickon Hinchliffe - Red Riding: In The Year Of Our Lord 1980 (Original Score) (Blackest Ever Black, 2013)
- Dickon Hinchliffe - At Any Price (Music From The Motion Picture) (Milan, 2013)
- Dickon Hinchliffe - Out Of The Furnace (Original Motion Picture Soundtrack) (Sony Classical, 2014)
- Dickon Hinchliffe - Locke (Original Motion Picture Soundtrack) (Fiction Records, 2014)
- Dickon Hinchliffe - Hateship Loveship (Original Motion Picture Soundtrack) (Filmtrax, 2016)
- Dickon Hinchliffe - Leave No Trace (Original Motion Picture Soundtrack) (Lakeshore Records, 2018)
- Dickon Hinchliffe - Yardie (The Original Score) (Globe Productions, 2018)
- Dickon Hinchliffe - Ben Is Back (Original Motion Picture Soundtrack) (Varèse Sarabande, 2018)
- Dickon Hinchliffe - Misbehaviour (Original Motion Picture Soundtrack) (Decca, 2020)
- Dickon Hinchliffe - The Third Day: Winter (Music from the Limited Series) (Masterworks, 2020)
- Dickon Hinchliffe - The Lost Daughter (Milan, 2021)
- Dickon Hinchliffe - Father Stu (Original Motion Picture Soundtrack) (Madison Gate Records, 2022)
- Dickon Hinchliffe - Daddio (Original Motion Picture Soundtrack) (Milan, 2024)
- Dickon Hinchliffe - Firebrand (Original Motion Picture Soundtrack) (Lakeshore Record, 2024)
- Dickon Hinchliffe - Prisoner 951 (Original Television Soundtrack) (Silva Screen Records, 2025)
- David Boulter - Yarmouth (Clay Pipe, 2020)
- David Boulter - Twelve Bells for Libuše (single, Clay Pipe, 2021)
- David Boulter - Lover's Walk (The Spoken World, 2021)
- David Boulter - Tinnitus (Original Soundtrack) (The Spoken World, 2023)
- David Boulter - Factory (single, Clay Pipe, 2023)
- David Boulter - Displaced (Original Soundtrack) (The Spoken World, 2023)
- David Boulter - Five Nights In Maine (Original Soundtrack) (The Spoken World, 2024)
- David Boulter - St. Ann's (Clay Pipe, 2024)
- David Boulter - Whitby (Clay Pipe, 2025)

=== Videos and DVDs ===
- Curtains (VHS, Live Concert) (Island Records, 1997)
- Bareback - nine films by Martin Wallace (Beggars Banquet, 2004)
