= Curtains (Tindersticks album) =

Studio album by Tindersticks
- Released: 24 June 1997
- Recorded: 8 July – 6 October 1996
- Studios: Angel Recording Studios, Islington, London, England; Eastcote Studios, London, England; Searsound, NY
- Genre: Chamber pop
- Length: 65:41
- Producer: Tindersticks

Tindersticks chronology
Nénette et Boni (1996)	Curtains (1997)	Simple Pleasure (1999)

Professional ratings
Review scores
Source	Rating
AllMusic	4.5/5 stars
Entertainment Weekly	B+
The Guardian	4/5 stars
NME	8/10
Pitchfork	8.8/10
Rolling Stone	4/5 stars
Uncut	4/5 stars

Curtains is the third studio album by English indie rock band Tindersticks, released on 24 June 1997.

== Track listing ==
1. "Another Night In" – 5:11
2. "Rented Rooms" – 5:12
3. "Don't Look Down" – 4:18
4. "Dick's Slow Song" – 4:09
5. "Fast One" – 1:52
6. "Ballad of Tindersticks" – 7:37
7. "Dancing" – 2:56
8. "Let's Pretend" – 3:21
9. "Desperate Man" – 3:21
10. "Buried Bones" – 4:03 (duet with Ann Magnuson)
11. "Bearsuit" – 2:11
12. "(Tonight) Are You Trying to Fall in Love Again" – 3:07
13. "I Was Your Man" – 3:39
14. "Bathtime" – 4:03
15. "Walking" – 5:25
16. "A Marriage Made in Heaven" – 5:16 (Bonus track on US London Records issue - duet with Isabella Rossellini)

== Charts ==
Chart performance for Curtains
Chart (1997)	Peak position
Belgian Albums (Ultratop Flanders)	26
French Albums (SNEP)	34
German Albums (Offizielle Top 100)	89
Norwegian Albums (VG-lista)	33
Scottish Albums (Official Charts)	57
Swedish Albums (Sverigetopplistan)	41
UK Albums (Official Charts)	37
