= Tindersticks (1993 album) =

Studio album by Tindersticks
- Released: 11 October 1993
- Recorded: May 1993
- Studios: Townhouse III, London
- Genre: Chamber pop
- Length: 77:02
- Label: This Way Up
- Producers: Tindersticks; Ian Caple

Tindersticks chronology
Tindersticks (1993)	Tindersticks (1995)

Tindersticks is the debut album by the chamber pop band Tindersticks, released in the UK on 11 October 1993 on This Way Up. Following positive reviews for their early singles and live performances, it was released to widespread critical acclaim by the music press, eventually being named album of the year by the UK music magazine Melody Maker.

== Release and promotion ==
The album was released on CD and as a double vinyl album which featured a bonus track, "Fruitless", that was not included on the CD (on the CD's track listing "Fruitless" is crossed out). The album included re-recorded versions of both sides of the band's debut single, "Patchwork" and "Milky Teeth", and their second single "Marbles", which had been released as a 10" single only – both singles were originally released on Tindersticks' own Tippy Toes label.

The band's new label This Way Up released "City Sickness" on 13 September 1993 as the third single ahead of the album, and the group made their first video to accompany the single with director Martin Wallace, marking the beginning of a long association between the band and Wallace. At the time Wallace was working with Pulp, and Jarvis Cocker co-directed the "City Sickness" video along with Wallace. The video features scenes of everyday life shot in and around London's Hyde Park, focussing on keyboard player Dave Boulter pushing a buggy with singer Stuart Staples' baby daughter Sydonie in it.

By the time of the album's release Tindersticks had already picked up critical acclaim in the music press and from BBC Radio 1 DJs John Peel and Mark Radcliffe, who named Tindersticks as his favourite album of the year. The band recorded several sessions for the programmes of both DJs, including the first night of Radcliffe and Marc Riley's new late night Radio 1 show on 25 October 1993 (they also played on the show's final broadcast on 6 February 1997).

In June 2004, Island Records reissued the first four Tindersticks albums as remastered 2-CD sets featuring the original album and a bonus CD. For Tindersticks the bonus CD featured twelve demo versions of tracks recorded during sessions for the album.

As of March 1994 it had sold over 20,000 copies in United Kingdom.

== Cover ==
The first 1,000 copies of the album included a pack of four postcards, featuring the front cover of the album, the portrait of the band on the inner sleeve, and paintings of a boy and a girl (the painting of the girl had already appeared as the cover of "Marbles"). The cover is a reproduction of a painting, The Red Dress, by popular mid-20th-century Spanish artist Francisco Rodriguez Sanchez Clement.

The painting is displayed in the living room of Mrs Browns Boys.

== Critical reception ==
Professional ratings
Review scores
Source	Rating
AllMusic	4.5/5 stars
Chicago Tribune	3.5/4 stars
The Encyclopedia of Popular Music	4/5 stars
Entertainment Weekly	B
NME	8/10
Q	3/5 stars
Sputnikmusic	5/5
Vox	7/10

Melody Maker said, "Some might consider releasing a double album as your debut a mite ambitious, but Tindersticks have that much more to offer. This album moves like a camera through a night in the heart of town. Behind the lens, a stranger, a lover and a fighter ... There's sweet romance at this album's core, even though it's tarnished by violence ... Their songs all invoke the uncomfortable claustrophobia of a big city ... So here it is, the main feature. Tindersticks is all I've said and more. And for Tindersticks, this epic movie is only the beginning." NME felt that "Tindersticks may not be perfect, but there's much on these four sides that warrants its alleged indulgence. For while the singles supplied a detailed sketch of the band's musical worth, the album offers the full picture, freshly painted and beautifully framed. Tacky in places for sure, but, on the whole, massively moving and daring ... gut instinct dictates that Tindersticks will be recommended as required listening in the winter months to come. The full impact of this amazing, exasperating, but ultimately fascinating album will yet be felt." Rolling Stone wrote that the album "draws inspiration from the playful narrative style of producer Lee Hazlewood (Duane Eddy, Nancy Sinatra), the Cinemascope orchestrations of John Barry and the twilight-zone claustrophobia of Nick Cave and the Bad Seeds."

AllMusic said of the album, "A thrilling, revelatory debut, Tindersticks is a chamber pop masterpiece of romantic elegance and gutter debauchery. Within the framework of a remarkably consistent and mesmerizingly dank atmosphere, the group covers a stunning amount of ground ... Fascinatingly constructed and strikingly ambitious, Tindersticks is insidiously labyrinthine: the music speaks softly but carries tremendous weight, and its hold grows more and more unbreakable with each listen."

=== Accolades ===
Tindersticks was named album of the year by Melody Maker and placed at number 13 on the NME's equivalent list. In the list of NME's singles of the year for 1993, "Marbles" was placed at number 7 and "City Sickness" made number 42, while Melody Maker named "City Sickness" the fourth best single of 1993.

In 2024, The Independent included the album in their list of 20 most underrated albums at number 19.

== Track listing ==
All songs written and composed by Tindersticks.

1. "Nectar" – 2:40
2. "Tyed" – 4:11
3. "Pt 1" – 0:41
4. "Whiskey & Water" – 5:51
5. "Blood" – 4:52
6. "City Sickness" – 4:00
7. "Patchwork" – 4:40
8. "Marbles" – 4:30
9. "The Walt Blues" – 1:08
10. "Milky Teeth" – 2:52
11. "Sweet Sweet Man Pt 2" – 1:05
12. "Jism" – 6:03
13. "Piano Song" – 2:40
14. "Tie-Dye" – 4:00
15. "Raindrops" – 6:15
16. "Pt 3" – 1:44
17. "Her" – 3:29
18. "Tea Stain" – 2:07
19. "Drunk Tank" – 4:44
20. "Paco de Renaldo's Dream" – 4:22
21. "The Not Knowing" – 4:58
- Note: "Fruitless" was included as a bonus track on the vinyl version of the album only, as the album's second track between "Nectar" and "Tyed". The title is shown as struck out on the CD track listing.

=== 2004 remaster ===
The 2004 remaster contains two discs. The first is a remastered version of the original CD version of the album. The bonus disc contains "Tindersticks Demos" as listed below:

1. "The Sorrow the Joy Brings" – 4:04
2. "Fruitless" – 2:02
3. "Whiskey & Water" – 5:39
4. "For Those ..." – 3:58
5. "Blood" – 4:49
6. "City Sickness" – 4:14
7. "Patchwork" – 4:23
8. "Raindrops" – 5:38
9. "Piano Song" – 4:46
10. "A Sweet Sweet Man" – 4:51
11. "Visiting" – 5:25
12. "Drunk Tank" – 5:41

== Personnel ==
Tindersticks

- Stuart Staples – vocals, guitar
- David Boulter – keyboards
- Neil Fraser – guitar
- Dickon Hinchliffe – violin
- Mark Colwill – bass guitar
- Alistair Macaulay – drums, vibraphone

Additional personnel

- Terry Edwards – trumpet, soprano saxophone on "The Not Knowing"
- Martin Harman – oboe on "The Not Knowing"
- Rosie Lindsell – bassoon on "The Not Knowing"
- Ian Bishop – clarinet on "The Not Knowing"

Production

- Producers: Ian Caple, Tindersticks
- Engineer: Ian Caple
- Arranger: Tindersticks
- Sleeve design: Tindersticks

== Release history ==
Region	Date	Label	Format	Catalog
United Kingdom	11 October 1993	This Way Up	double LP	518 307–1
United Kingdom	11 October 1993	This Way Up	CD	518 306–2
United Kingdom	14 June 2004	Island Records	Remastered 2-CD version	981 688–1
