= Simple Pleasure (Tindersticks album) =

Studio album by Tindersticks
- Released: 1999
- Studios: RAK Studios, London
- Genre: Chamber pop
- Length: 43:34
- Label: Island
- Producer: Stuart A. Staples

Tindersticks chronology
Curtains (1997)	Simple Pleasure (1999)	Can Our Love... (2001)

Professional ratings
Review scores
Source	Rating
AllMusic	3.5/5 stars
The Encyclopedia of Popular Music	3/5 stars
The Guardian	3/5 stars
NME	8/10
Select	4/5

Simple Pleasure is the fourth studio album by Tindersticks. It was released in 1999 on Island Records. The album marked a major departure for the band, as it began to adapt more soul and jazz influences than on their previous recordings.

The album was a remarkable success in Greece, charting at #4 in the international artist chart. It peaked at #36 in the UK Albums chart. The album was not released in the US.

== Critical reception ==
The Independent wrote that "if you don't mind the sound of someone crooning while drinking a glass of water, you'll find this record a gem: a long, dark night ... with soul."

== Track listing ==
1. "Can We Start Again?" – 3:51
2. "If You're Looking for a Way Out" – 5:06
3. "Pretty Words" – 3:18
4. "From the Inside" – 2:54
5. "If She's Torn" – 5:43
6. "Before You Close Your Eyes" – 6:15
7. "(You Take) This Heart of Mine" – 4:23
8. "I Know That Loving" – 5:48
9. "CF GF" – 6:10

Bonus tracks from the 2018 vinyl expanded edition:

1. "Twisted Wheel" (demo) – 2:55
2. "One Way Street" – 2:46
3. "(You're a) Pussycat" – 5:05
4. "If She's Torn" (demo) – 5:44
5. "A Little Time" – 1:54
6. "Pretty Words" (demo) – 3:59
7. "(You Take) This Heart of Mine" (demo) – 2:31
8. "I Know That Loving (Adrian Sherwood Remix)" – 3:56
9. "David's Soul" (demo) – 2:34
10. "If You're Looking for a Way Out" (demo) – 5:10
11. "Puppy Fat" – 10:50
12. "CF GF" (demo) – 5:26

== Charts ==
Chart performance for Simple Pleasure
Chart (1999)	Peak position
Belgian Albums (Ultratop Flanders)	37
French Albums (SNEP)	71
German Albums (Offizielle Top 100)	64
Norwegian Albums (VG-lista)	33
Scottish Albums (Official Charts)	58
Swedish Albums (Sverigetopplistan)	43
UK Albums (Official Charts)	36
