= Tindersticks (1995 album) =

Studio album by Tindersticks
- Released: 3 April 1995 (UK); 22 August 1995 (US)
- Recorded: Conny's Studio, Cologne, 9–15 May 1994; Abbey Road Studios, London, 30 June & 4 July 1994 (strings); Orinoco, London, 5–10 July 1994
- Genre: Chamber pop
- Length: 70:26
- Label: This Way Up (UK); London (US)
- Producer: Tindersticks and Ian Caple

Tindersticks chronology
Tindersticks (1993)	Tindersticks (1995)	Nénette et Boni (1996)

Singles from Tindersticks
- 1. "No More Affairs" Released: 13 March 1995; 2. "Travelling Light" Released: 7 August 1995

Tindersticks is the second album by the British alternative band Tindersticks, released in 1995. It is often referred to as The Second Tindersticks Album to distinguish it from the band's first album, which was also called Tindersticks. It reached no. 13 in the UK Albums Chart.

On 17 September 2006, the album was performed live in its entirety at the Barbican Centre in London, as part of the All Tomorrow's Parties-curated Don't Look Back series. The concert was the last time the original six members of Tindersticks played together.

== Recording ==
The band chose Conny's Studios in Cologne after a recommendation from Blixa Bargeld when Tindersticks were supporting Nick Cave and the Bad Seeds on their tour of the UK in 1993. The group spent a week at Conny's Studios in May 1994 where most of the backing tracks for the album were recorded. On their return to London they enlisted the help of Terry Edwards for the string arrangements: "Sleepy Song" was recorded on a single microphone in one night at Abbey Road Studios on 30 June 1994, and the string sections were recorded a few days later at the same studio. The remaining recording sessions for vocals and additional instruments were done at Orinoco Studios in early July, and the album was mixed during July and August 1994 by the band and their engineer Ian Caple at the house the band shared, and at Studio 3 of Townhouse Studios.

== Release ==
The album was released in April 1995 on This Way Up in the UK and in August 1995 on London Records in the US As with their first and third albums, a remastered edition was released on Island Records in 2004 as a two-CD version, featuring the original album on the first disc and the live album The Bloomsbury Theatre 12.3.95 on the second disc.

The album's first single, "No More Affairs", was accompanied by a video filmed at the Rivoli Ballroom in south-east London, and second single "Travelling Light" is a duet between Tindersticks' singer Stuart Staples and Carla Torgerson of The Walkabouts. The track "My Sister" features a spoken monologue from Isabel Monteiro, singer of the band Drugstore.

== Artwork ==
The album's artwork features black and white photographs of the band being fitted for suits at Timothy Everest's atelier in London; the front cover shows guitarist Neil Fraser. The band's keyboard and accordion player David Boulter recalled in 2003 that "we'd always worn very ill-fitting second-hand suits, shirts, whatever, and, as a treat for our hard work, we arranged to have a tailor-made suit each. I could never be seen without my Timothy Everest suit for a long time after. Phil Nicholls took photos of the fitting, which became the sleeve."

== Critical reception ==
Professional ratings
Review scores
Source	Rating
AllMusic	4.5/5 stars
The Encyclopedia of Popular Music	4/5 stars
Entertainment Weekly	A−
The Guardian	3/4 stars
NME	8/10
Rolling Stone	3/5 stars
Select	4/5
Vox	8/10

Like its predecessor, the album was well received by the critics. AllMusic said "Tindersticks' second consecutive, eponymously titled double-LP set refines the approach of their debut; while every bit as ambitious and adventuresome, it achieves an even greater musical balance, stretching into luxuriously long compositional structures and more intricate arrangements ... Another awesome triumph of mood and atmosphere."

Rolling Stone proclaimed that "their music is frequently as beautiful as it is brooding, and in the space between lies its enigmatic, enduring appeal".

NME wrote that "time and again the 'Sticks weld crashing orchestral drapes onto the sparsest acoustic frames. What with Stuart Staples' inchoate mumbles veering towards the realms of self-parody, the initial impact is so understated as to be infuriating. Before long, however, the music's sheer otherworldly beauty acts like a virus and we're locked in, transfixed by the dreadful acts being perpetrated to and by these songs' characters ... the key to this immense, beguiling record: you can't aspire to Heaven unless you're well aware of Hell."

Melody Maker stated, "It's hard to explain just what a marvellous piece of work this record is ...The Tindersticks' Second Album contains gentle, tender crucifixions, nails through your heart, administered by a loving hand. Also the record is uncommonly beautiful. It has the unexpected contours and sudden perception-changing angles of the most dangerous and heart-stopping faces ... Tindersticks create cameos of such detail, such fidelity, that at moments you wonder if they have spies in every bedroom in the land. Like the lover it documents, The Tindersticks' Second Album is ravishing and complex, inexplicable and contradictory. It is compassionate and merciless. Gorgeous as sin. Buy it because you'll love it. Keep it because one day you'll need it."

=== Accolades ===
Melody Maker ranked the album at no. 5 in their critics' list of the best albums of 1995. NME placed the album at no. 13 in their equivalent list.

== Track listing ==
All songs written and arranged by Tindersticks.

1. "El Diablo en el Ojo" – 3:32
2. "A Night In" – 6:25
3. "My Sister" – 8:11
4. "Tiny Tears" – 5:45
5. "Snowy in F♯ Minor" – 2:28
6. "Seaweed" – 5:14
7. "Vertrauen II" – 3:19
8. "Talk to Me" – 5:00
9. "No More Affairs" – 3:49
10. "Singing" – 0:57
11. "Travelling Light" – 4:51
12. "Cherry Blossoms" – 4:19
13. "She's Gone" – 3:29
14. "Mistakes" – 5:44
15. "Vertrauen III" – 2:20
16. "Sleepy Song" – 4:37

== Additional personnel ==
- Ben Chappell – cello on "My Sister"
- Terry Edwards – trumpets, saxophones and French horns
- Biff Harrison – saw on "My Sister" and "Vertrauen III"
- Mike Kearsey – trombone on "My Sister"
- Isabel Monteiro – whisper on "My Sister"
- Carla Torgerson – duet vocals on "Travelling Light"
- Sendrine – French translation and narration on "Mistakes"
- String quartet on "El Diablo en el Ojo" and "She's Gone", arranged by Tindersticks and Terry Edwards:
  - Ann Louise Child, Calina de la Mare, Lucy Wilkins and Sarah Wilson
- String section on "A Night In", "Tiny Tears", "Talk to Me", "Travelling Light" and "Mistakes", arranged by Tindersticks and Terry Edwards, organised and conducted by Rosie Lindsell:
  - Violins – Heather Broadbent, Vic Evans, Zillah Hawley, Suzanna Horne, Tanja Housten, Becky Leetch, Caroline Luckhurst, Kate MacKenzie, Suzannah Marsden, Jeff Moore, Julie Nicholau, Louise Walters, Amanda Westgarth and Lucy Wilkins
  - Violas – Hannah Bliss, Maritza Bulcock, Ann Louise Child, Kate Fraser and Samie Pullman
  - Cellos – Clare Parkholm, Annabelle Simmons, Andrew Skrimshire and Sarah Wilson

NB: Some names are misspelled on the credits on the album sleeve.
