= Maria McKee discography =

- Studio albums: 7
- Live albums: 3
- Compilation albums: 2
- Singles: 17

This article is a discography for American singer Maria McKee. For releases as part of Lone Justice, see Lone Justice § Discography.

== Albums ==
=== Studio albums ===
Title	Album details	Peak chart positions							
Title	Album details	US	US Heat	US Indie	AUS	NOR	NZ	SWE	UK
Maria McKee	Released: June 1989; Label: Geffen; Formats: CD, LP, MC	120	—	—	117	—	37	—	49
You Gotta Sin to Get Saved	Released: June 8, 1993; Label: Geffen; Formats: CD, LP, MC	—	12	—	135	11	—	12	26
Life Is Sweet	Released: February 21, 1996; Label: Geffen; Formats: CD, MC	—	17	—	—	22	—	8	81
High Dive	Released: April 22, 2003; Label: Viewfinder; Formats: CD	—	—	47	—	—	—	56	—
Peddlin' Dreams	Released: April 19, 2005; Label: Eleven Thirty; Formats: CD	—	—	—	—	—	—	24	—
Late December	Released: April 24, 2007; Label: Cooking Vinyl; Formats: CD	—	—	—	—	—	—	—	—
La Vita Nuova	Released: March 13, 2020; Label: Fire; Formats: CD, 2xLP, digital download	—	—	—	—	—	—	—	—
"—" denotes releases that did not chart or were not released in that territory.

=== Live albums ===
Title	Album details
Live in Hamburg	Released: May 10, 2004; Label: Viewfinder; Formats: CD
Live – Acoustic Tour 2006	Released: October 17, 2006; Label: Cooking Vinyl; Formats: CD
Live at the BBC	Released: January 2008; Label: Universal/Geffen; Formats: CD

=== Compilation albums ===
Title	Album details
Ultimate Collection	Released: August 22, 2000; Label: Hip-O; Formats: CD
20th Century Masters – The Millennium Collection: The Best of Maria McKee	Released: October 21, 2003; Label: Geffen; Formats: CD

== Singles ==
Title	Year	Peak chart positions										Album
Title	Year	US AC	US Alt	AUS	CAN	CAN AC	NL	NOR	NZ	SWE	UK	Album
"I've Forgotten What It Was in You (That Put the Need in Me)"	1989	—	29	—	—	—	—	—	—	—	—	Maria McKee
"Nobody's Child"	1989	—	—	—	—	—	—	—	—	—	—	Maria McKee
"To Miss Someone"	1990	—	—	—	—	—	—	—	—	—	—	Maria McKee
"Show Me Heaven"	1990	28	—	3	69	30	1	1	12	2	1	Days of Thunder (soundtrack)
"Breathe"	1991	—	—	—	—	—	—	—	—	—	59	Maria McKee
"Sweetest Child"	1992	—	—	—	—	—	60	—	—	—	45	non-album single
"I'm Gonna Soothe You"	1993	—	—	160	49	34	—	—	—	—	35	You Gotta Sin to Get Saved
"Opelousas (Sweet Relief)" (promo-only release)	1993	—	—	—	—	—	—	—	—	—	—	Sweet Relief: A Benefit for Victoria Williams
"I Can't Make It Alone"	1993	—	—	—	—	—	—	—	—	—	74	You Gotta Sin to Get Saved
"Absolutely Barking Stars"	1996	—	—	—	—	—	—	—	—	—	—	Life Is Sweet
"This Perfect Dress"	1996	—	—	—	—	—	—	—	—	—	85	Life Is Sweet
"Life Is Sweet" (Sweden-only release)	1996	—	—	—	—	—	—	—	—	—	—	Life Is Sweet
"In Your Constellation" (promo-only release)	2003	—	—	—	—	—	—	—	—	—	—	High Dive
"Turn Away" (UK promo-only release)	2005	—	—	—	—	—	—	—	—	—	—	Peddlin' Dreams
"Sullen Soul" (UK promo-only release)	2005	—	—	—	—	—	—	—	—	—	—	Peddlin' Dreams
"A Good Heart"	2007	—	—	—	—	—	—	—	—	—	—	Late December
"Effigy of Salt"	2019	—	—	—	—	—	—	—	—	—	—	La Vita Nuova
"—" denotes releases that did not chart or were not released in that territory.

== Miscellaneous music contributions, compilations, movie soundtracks, etc. ==
- "Never Be You" – Maria McKee – Streets of Fire movie soundtrack (1984)
- Sang uncredited background vocals on Tonio K’s "You Belong with Me" on the album Romeo Unchained (1986)
- "Bury Me" – Dwight Yoakam & Maria McKee (duet on Yoakam's debut album) Guitars, Cadillacs, Etc., Etc. (1986)
- Appeared in the music video of Somewhere Down the Crazy River by Robbie Robertson (1987)
- Sang backing vocals on American Roulette also by Robbie Robertson (1987)
- "Send Me the Pillow That You Dream On" – (harmony vocals) from Dwight Yoakam album Buenas Noches from a Lonely Room (1988)
- Sang backing vocals on the song "Nothing But a Child" – from the album Copperhead Road by Steve Earle (1988).
- "Show Me Heaven" – Maria McKee – Days of Thunder / movie soundtrack (1990) (No. 1 hit in the UK)
- Sang background vocals on the Album Mothers Heaven by Texas vocalist Sharleen Spiteri (1991)
- Sang vocals and backing vocals on Falling Off the Edge of the World from Gavin Friday's album Adam 'n' Eve (1992)
- Sweet Relief: A Benefit for Victoria Williams (V/A compilation) (1993)
- Sang backing vocals on the song "Sullivan Street" – from the album August and Everything After by Counting Crows (1993)
- "If Love Is a Red Dress (Hang Me in Rags) – Maria McKee – Pulp Fiction (soundtrack) (1994)
- "Cover Me" – Tim White & Maria McKee - Come As You Are by Maranatha! Praise Band (1996)
- "At Your Feet" – Maria McKee - Come As You Are by Maranatha! Praise Band (1996)
- "No Big Bang" – Maria McKee w/ the Heads (of Talking Heads) on their album No Talking, Just Head (1996)
- "Sweet Jane" – from the U2 bootleg Unforgettable Duets (1998)
- "Wayfaring Stranger" - Maria McKee - Songcatcher soundtrack (2000)
- "Ma blonde est partie" & "Tout un beau soir en me promenant" – Maria McKee – Evangeline Made: A Tribute to Cajun Music (V/A compilation) (2002)
- "Tender Even Then (with Maria McKee)" – Kristian Hoffman's album & (2002)
- "Soul Mass Transit" by Subterraneans (2006)
- "This Road Is Long" – Stuart A. Staples w/ Maria McKee (duet) – on Staples's album Leaving Songs (2006)
- Sang duet with Marvin Etzioni on the song "Temple & Shrine" from the album All Four One: Vol. 1 – Americana Compilation (V/A compilation) (2007)
- Sang backing vocals and played piano on the album I Can't Die In L.A. by Hail The Size (2009)
- After the Triumph of Your Birth, original film soundtrack by Maria McKee and Jim Akin (2012)
- "The Ocean of Helena Lee", original film soundtrack by Maria McKee and Jim Akin (2015)
- "Ol' Mother Earth" with Massar Egbari's "I Still Exist" – from the album Songs from a Stolen Spring (2014)
- Covered the traditional gospel blues song "Let Your Light Shine on Me" on the album God Don't Never Change: The Songs of Blind Willie Johnson (2016)

== Maria McKee songs recorded by other artists ==
- "A Good Heart" recorded by Feargal Sharkey on his album Feargal Sharkey (1985)
- "A Good Heart" recorded by Kris McKay on the various artists soundtrack album "Road House" (1994)
- "To Miss Someone" recorded by Feargal Sharkey on his album Songs from the Mardi Gras (1991)
- "Am I the Only One (Who's Ever Felt This Way)" recorded by Dead Ringer Band on their album Living in the Circle (1997) and the Dixie Chicks on their album Wide Open Spaces (1998)
- "To Deserve You" and "The Last Time", recorded by Bette Midler on her album Bette of Roses (1995)
- "I Forgive You", recorded by Sam Brown on her album Box (1997) Song Co-written McKee/Brown
- "Show Me Heaven" recorded by Laura Branigan for her album The Best of Branigan (1995)
- "Show Me Heaven" recorded by Tina Arena on her album Don't Ask (1997)
- "Show Me Heaven" recorded by Jessica Andrews on her album Who I Am (2001)
