= Maria McKee Live – Acoustic Tour 2006 =

Live - Acoustic Tour 2006

Live album by Maria McKee
- Released: October 17, 2006
- Label: Cooking Vinyl

Maria McKee chronology
Peddlin' Dreams (2005)	Live - Acoustic Tour 2006 (2006)

Professional ratings
Review scores
Source	Rating
Allmusic	4/5 stars

Live – Acoustic Tour 2006 is the seventh album by American singer/songwriter Maria McKee, released in 2006 (see 2006 in music).

== Track listing ==
1. "This World Is Not My Home"
2. "Peddlin' Dreams"
3. "Shelter"
4. "High Dive/Barstool Blues"
5. "Orange Skies" (Bryan MacLean)
6. "Breathe" (Maria McKee & Gregg Sutton)
7. "In The Long Run"
8. "Don't Toss Us Away" (MacLean)
9. "Belfry"
10. "A Good Heart"
11. "Sullen Soul" (Jim Akin)
12. "Blessed Salvation" (MacLean)
13. "Has He Got A Friend For Me" (Richard Thompson)
14. "Backstreets" (Bruce Springsteen)
