= After the Triumph of Your Birth =

2012 film directed by Jim Akin

- Directed by: Jim Akin
- Written by: Jim Akin
- Produced by: Jim Akin; Maria McKee
- Starring: Tom Dunne; Tessa Ferrer; Bronagh Gallagher; Maria Mckee; Maria Doyle Kennedy; Rob Zabrecky
- Music by: Jim Akin; Maria McKee
- Release date: August 6, 2012
- Running time: 119 minutes
- Country: United States
- Language: English
- Budget: $550

After the Triumph of Your Birth is a 2012 American drama film written and directed by Jim Akin. The film stars Tom Dunne, Tessa Ferrer, Bronagh Gallagher, Maria Mckee, Maria Doyle Kennedy and Rob Zabrecky. The musical score was composed by Jim Akin and Maria McKee.

== Synopsis ==
Eli Willit is a haunted man who sets out on foot to make a seven-day journey, which will take him from the desert to the ocean. In need of spiritual cleansing, Eli's walkabout leads him not just to water, but also through his life's memories, as we are presented with four separate-story lines dealing with spiritual fragility and the questioning of what constitutes existence and reality.
