= Leaving Songs =

Leaving Songs may refer to:

- Leaving Songs (Kristofer Åström album), a 2001 album
- Leaving Songs (Stuart A. Staples album), a 2006 album
