= Holy Cross (film) =

2003 BBC television film

- Also known as: Red and Blue (working title)
- Genre: Drama
- Written by: Terry Cafolla
- Directed by: Mark Brozel
- Starring: Zara Turner; Bronagh Gallagher; Colum Convey; Patrick O'Kane
- Music by: Dominic Muldowney
- Country of origin: United Kingdom
- Original language: English

Production
- Executive producers: Robert Cooper; Mary Callery (RTÉ)
- Producers: Robert Cooper; Jonathan Curling
- Production locations: Liverpool, England
- Cinematography: Kevin Rowley
- Editor: Colin Goudie
- Running time: 85 minutes
- Production companies: BBC Northern Ireland; Raidió Teilifís Éireann

Original release
- Network: RTÉ One
- Release: 8 November 2003
- Network: BBC One
- Release: 10 November 2003

Holy Cross is a Northern Irish drama television film, directed by Mark Brozel and written by Terry Cafolla, and starring Zara Turner and Bronagh Gallagher. It premiered on RTÉ One on 8 November 2003, before receiving its broadcast on BBC One on 10 November 2003.

The film is based on the events of the Holy Cross dispute of 2001, which affected the families and children who attended the Holy Cross Primary School, a Catholic school for girls, in the Ardoyne, Belfast area. The school, situated in a predominantly Protestant Loyalist area, led to an eruption of sectarian attacks against the pupils of Holy Cross, for which Loyalists targeted as a means of retaliation, claiming that it was a result of Catholics vandalising their homes and denying them access to local facilities.

== Plot ==
The film tells the story in the points of view of two families: the McClures, a Catholic family living in the Ardoyne estate, and the Nortons, a Protestant Loyalist family in the Glenbryn estate. Sarah Norton is a single mother trying to raise her daughter, Karen to show respect to others, despite their religious background, but finds it difficult to maintain a normal life with the hatred and rivalry between Catholics and Protestants. Ann McClure, is a mother of three, and married to Gerry, a former ex-member of the Provisional Irish Republican Army (IRA) who served time in prison. She is struggling to keep her children safe and is desperate to keep the peace.

During a Loyalists Residents Meeting, which Sarah and her neighbours attend to discuss the rising sectarian attacks on their homes from Catholic teenagers, referred to as "Fenian Hoods", they express their fears of being pushed out and suggest a wall to be built to keep the trouble at bay, a suggestion which is shut down on the grounds that it will take time.

When a resident of the Ardoyne estate is driving by in his car, he becomes angry with a group of men putting up a Loyalist paramilitary flag and orders them to take it down; when they refuse, the man reverses into them and a fight erupts between Catholics and Protestants. Families whose children attend the Holy Cross Primary School are no longer permitted to use the road to enter the school and a police blockade is put in place by to protect them and the children are forced to exit the school through an alternative route. The Holy Cross is temporarily closed for the children's safety and a cross community meeting is held to address the issue. The Catholic children, alongside their mothers, are granted access to walk down one side of the road, while fathers aren't permitted due to the accusations that they are "Provies", a decision that Gerry does not agree with.

Towards the end of school term before summer, the Board of Governors of Holy Cross hold a meeting when the parents are up in arms over the recent events, as Catholic families in turn have suffered under a number of sectarian attacks and are in fear of the school's closure. While the school will remain open, it is announced that the road will remain closed under safety measures, which the parents feel is unnecessary, as their children have a right to walk to school.

As the attacks begin to escalate, Sarah struggles to keep her daughter safe, particularly during The Twelfth, when she realises her home is no longer safe following the departure of her next-door neighbour, Dawn. Gerry discovers that his son, Tony is a "Hood", and expresses his disgust leading to an argument between him and Ann, who believes that their son is only doing what Gerry did before he was sent to prison.

On the first day of the new school term, the police form a blockade to protect the Holy Cross children. Families are divided as to whether they should take the alternative path, or stand their ground and take their chances through the front entrance. Sarah almost loses Karen when the violence erupts, and takes her hatred out on the Catholic families. On the second day of school, Karen witnesses Sarah shouting verbal abuse at the passing children and parents. Regretful of her actions, she explains her reasons to Karen. Ann becomes faced with a dilemma in struggling to protecting her children, while trying to understand Gerry's side of standing up for oneself. The McClure's home is targeted in a petrol bomb attack. The following day, an explosive is thrown onto the road, leaving a policeman injured and the children and parents fearing for their lives. Gerry realises his pride is not worth putting his family in danger. It is alluded that Sarah threw the explosive.

On Friday 23 November 2001, after 12 weeks, the protests come to an end. Upon discovering that her youngest daughter has wet the bed, and the impact the events have left on she and her family, Ann breaks down in tears, while Sarah becomes distraught, fearing that Karen will hate her of her recent behaviour. The Loyalists agreed to suspend the protest in exchange for various demands, including a wall, which is finally built between Ardoyne and Glenbryn.

== Cast ==
- Zara Turner as Ann McClure
- Bronagh Gallagher as Sarah Norton
- Colum Convey as Gerry McClure
- Patrick O'Kane as Uncle Peter Norton
- Louise Doran as Karen Norton
- Emma Whyte as Siobhan McClure
- Lauren McDonald as Aoife McClure
- Henry Deazley as Tony McClure
- Fergal McElherron as Roy
- Cara Kelly as Dawn
- Emma Aiken as Debbie
- George Shane as Harry
- Brendan Mackey as Billy
- Wendy Paul as Kylie
- Kieran Creggan as Sam
- Michael Liebmann as Mani
- Maclean Stewart as Bin
- Richard Dormer as Seamus
- Aoife McMahon as Mary
- Colin Murphy as Matt
- James Dornan as Sean
- Alexandra Ford as Ardoyne Resident

== Production ==
One of the reasons that people can be frightened of a film like this is because are worried that the road to understanding leads to condoning what they regard as appalling behaviour but it's only through understanding that we can make sense of the world we live in. Once you demonise or dehumanise people then it becomes alright to push them aside. And that's the kind if sentiment that takes you onto a line to scream at five-year-old girls. What the film shows is the cost of demonisation. It's relevant to any situation in the world where there is acute conflict.

— Robert Cooper

Holy Cross was produced by BBC Northern Ireland, in association with RTÉ. It was filmed entirely on location in Liverpool in June 2003, under the working title "Red and Blue". Due to the sensitive nature of the film it could not be shot in Belfast.

Executive Producer, Robert Cooper made clear that the depiction of events which took place in the film would not be a reenactment of what actually occurred in real life. They felt it wasn't worth making unless they could provide insight as to why the incident came about and why people acted the way they did.

The film was written by Terry Cafolla, based on a script that was described as "exhaustive research." The makers attempted to gain research from those who experienced the events as residents on both sides of the divide were reluctant to talk to the media. Cafolla suggested that "There is almost always two truths where this dispute is concerned, as people from each side of the community are embedded in their version of events becomes the truth. Many incidents are claim and counterclaim with mo other witnesses. The events happened because there are two communities and very different points of view and each side is unwilling to acknowledge the other's viewpoint. Feelings run so deeply on both sides, it was inevitable that, when the trigger point was reached, the results would be explosive, and that is what we have tried to show."

The residents felt the media became part of the problem when the situation began, which is why they felt bitter towards them. They felt that they had been poorly represented at the time. Produce, Jonathan Curling explained "many residences on both sides of the divide had been left with a lasting suspicion of the media and were initially reluctant to talk to the programme-makers. The main difficulty was to try and convince the people involved that they were trying to be true to the stories and not coming to it with an agenda, and in Northern Ireland that's very hard."

Director, Mark Brozel spent time with families on both sides of the divide, trying to understand and gain insight of how people became locked in their own version of events, "I found my sympathies being turned on and off like a light – spending time with one family you see the world from their point of view and then when you go to the other side you feel it from their perspective. So if I find it difficult to rationalise what's going on, how much more difficult must it be for people who are caught up in it?"

Belfast-born actress, Zara Turner was cast as Ann McClure, a Catholic mother of three, struggling with day-to-day live in the Ardoyne, and is desperate to protect her children from the violent protests. As a mother, Turner found it easy to relate to her character and found that Holy Cross was a subject that needed to be talked about. Turner stated that "I think it's a very delicate thing to deal with because You're talking about people who still live in those situations", and "when it was actually happening, you saw two or three minutes of horror on the news and the film tries to look at what was going on behind those pictures." Bronagh Gallagher plays Sarah Norton, a Protestant, single mother who is forced to join the protests in the attacks, despite not being a sectarian, trying to bring up her daughter to respect Catholics. Although brought up Catholic, in what she described as "a very aggressive, army-controlled environment", Gallagher had no problem with playing a Protestant as she said that "it is as important to tell another story as my own".

== Reception ==
Holy Cross was met with hostility prior to its broadcast. There was much opposition from local residents as they felt it was too raw a subject and a film would only provoke trouble. Father Aidan Troy of the Holy Cross Monastery, who braved the mob of protesters to lead a group of children to the school gates was outraged and commented that "It is just too raw ... The suspension of the protest only came on 23 November 2001. The children at the school are the same children. The families are the same families. And the protesters are the same protesters. Lots of parents are saying this programme could cause big trouble yet."

BBC Controller of Drama, Jane Tranter defended the decision to broadcast the film, stating "There is never going to be the right time to do a film like this. If you leave it for five years the currency will have gone".

== See also ==
- Holy Cross dispute
- The Troubles
- Timeline of the Troubles
- The Troubles in Ardoyne
- Timeline of Ulster Defence Association actions
