= Life Is Sweet =

Life Is Sweet may refer to:

- Life Is Sweet (film), a 1990 film by Mike Leigh

== Music ==
- Life Is Sweet (album), a 1996 album by Maria McKee
- Life Is Sweet, an album by The Lodger
- "Life Is Sweet" (song), a 1995 song by The Chemical Brothers
- "Life Is Sweet", a song by Natalie Merchant on the album Ophelia
- Life Is Sweet! Nice to Meet You, a 2010 album by Lightspeed Champion

== Other ==
- Life Is Sweet (horse) (born 2005), winner of the 2009 Breeders' Cup Ladies' Classic
