= Bronagh Gallagher =

Irish actress

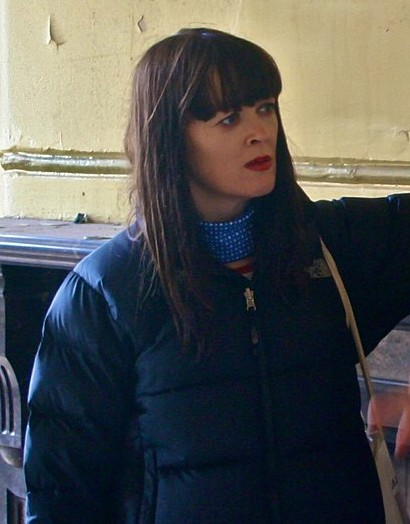
- Bronagh Gallagher in 2010
- Born: 1972 (age 53–54); Derry, Northern Ireland
- Occupations: Singer and actress
- Years active: 1989–present
- Website: www.bronaghgallagher.com

Bronagh Gallagher (born 1972) is an Irish singer and actress from Northern Ireland. She had her first acting role in the 1989 television movie Dear Sarah. She became known internationally known after her appearance in the 1991 film The Commitments.

== Early life and education ==
Bronagh Gallagher was born in 1972 in Derry, Northern Ireland, to working class Catholic parents. Her sister, Louise, is a film producer.

During her teenage years, she got involved in drama and music activities through school and joined a local amateur dramatics group called the Oakgrove Theatre Company. In 1989–90 she was a backing singer in a local band called The Listener.

== Career ==
Gallagher was first a hairdresser.

=== Music ===
Her first album, Precious Soul, was released in 2004 on the Salty Dog Records label and was produced by John Reynolds. The album features collaborations with Brian Eno on the songs "He Don't Love You" and "Hooks". Gallagher wrote most of the music on the album, played the drums and sang lead vocals.

She released a second album, Bronagh Gallagher, in 2012, and a third album, Gather Your Greatness, in 2016.

=== Acting ===
Gallagher's big break came when she starred as Bernie in The Commitments (1991), followed by a supporting role in the BBC drama You, Me & Marley (1992), which is part of the BBC anthology series, ScreenPlay. She had small parts in Pulp Fiction (1994) and Star Wars: Episode I – The Phantom Menace (1999). Other film appearances include Mary Reilly (1996), Divorcing Jack (1998), Thunderpants (2002), Skagerrak (2003), Tristan & Isolde (2006), Last Chance Harvey (2008), Sherlock Holmes (2009) and Grabbers (2012).

Gallagher has appeared on stage in Théâtre de Complicité touring production of The Street of Crocodiles and The National Theatre's production War Horse as Rose Narracott.

In 2009, Gallagher starred alongside a well-known cast on the MySpace/Vertigo Films production Faintheart and starred in the BBC Three comedy TV series Pramface in 2012.

On television, she played the mother of young Nick in the BBC drama Nick Nickleby. She played Trisha Meehan in The Field of Blood and Ada Mason in Agatha Christie's Poirot Series 10 episode, "The Mystery of the Blue Train".

In 2019, she began her role as Carol, the sister of amateur boxer Ashley in the Sky Original series Brassic.

== Recognition ==
An image of Gallagher, in character as Bernie McGloughlin in the film The Commitments, was featured on an Irish postage stamp as part of the Ireland 1996: Irish Cinema Centenary series issued by An Post. The image includes her The Commitments co-stars Angeline Ball as Imelda Quirke, Maria Doyle Kennedy as Natalie Murphy and Andrew Strong as Deco Cuffe.

In 2020, she was listed at number 33 on The Irish Times' list of Ireland's greatest film actors.

== Pledge ==
In September 2025, she signed an open pledge with Film Workers for Palestine pledging not to work with Israeli film institutions "that are implicated in genocide and apartheid against the Palestinian people."

== Acting credits ==
=== Film ===
Year	Title	Role	Notes
1990	Dear Sarah	Anne Conlon	TV film
1991	The Commitments	Bernie McGloughlin	
1992	You, Me and Marley	Frances	
1994	Pulp Fiction	Trudi	
1995	Ruffian Hearts	Dervla	TV film
1996	Mary Reilly	Annie	
1998	Painted Angels	Eileen	
1998	Divorcing Jack	Taxi Driver	
1999	This Year's Love	Carol	
1999	Star Wars: Episode I – The Phantom Menace	Captain Maoi Madakor	
2000	The Most Fertile Man in Ireland	Millicent	
2000	Wild About Harry	Miss Boyle	
2002	Sinners	Kitty	TV film
2002	Thunderpants	Mrs. Smash	
2003	Skagerrak	Sophie	
2003	Holy Cross	Sarah Norton	TV film
2003	Spin the Bottle	Teresa	
2005	Tara Road	Polly	
2006	Tristan & Isolde	Bragnae	
2006	Middletown	Tessie	
2007	Botched	Sonya	
2007	Agnes	Agnes Jones	TV film
2007	Clean the House	Cleaner	TV film
2008	Faintheart	Maggie	
2008	Last Chance Harvey	Oonagh	
2009	Malice in Wonderland	Hattie	
2009	Sherlock Holmes	Palm Reader	
2010	The Big I Am	Di Baines	
2010	Tamara Drewe	Eustacia	
2011	Albert Nobbs	Cathleen Page	
2011	Arthur Christmas	Elf	Voice role
2011	Where Are They Now?	Woman	Short
2012	Grabbers	Una Maher	
2012	After the Triumph of Your Birth	Woman of the Theater	
2013	Made in Belfast	Undertaker	
2013	Orbit Ever After	Mother	Short
2013	The Food Guide to Love	Rachel	
2014	Shooting for Socrates	Irene	
2014	Justlikeabitch	Mary	Short
2017	Return to Montauk	Irene	
2017	Brexit Shorts: Your Ma's a Hard Brexit		Short
2018	The Guernsey Literary and Potato Peel Pie Society	Charlotte Stimple	
2019	The Personal History of David Copperfield	Mrs. Micawber	
2019	A Bump Along the Way	Pamela	
2023	Dance First	Nora Barnacle	
2024	Bird		Cameo
2024	The End		

=== Television ===
Year	Title	Role	Notes
1992	Screenplay	Frances	Episode: "You, Me & Marley"
1992	The Bill	Nicola Purdy	2 episodes
1993	Over the Rainbow	Michelle	Series regular, 8 episodes
1995	Performance	Minnie Powell	Episode: "Shadow of a Gunman"
1996	Screen Two	Sandra Williamson	Episode: "The Precious Brood"
1999	Shockers	Alice Walker	Episode: "Deja Vu"
2000	Cry Wolf	Bambi	Episode: Series 1, Episode 5
2000	The Fitz	Teddy	Series regular, 6 episodes
2001	On a Life's Edge	Zoe	TV short
2004	The Clinic	Lisa	Episode: Series 2, Episode 8
2005	Agatha Christie's Poirot	Ada Mason	Episode: "The Mystery of the Blue Train"
2007	Holby City	Gilly Conran	Episode: "Paranoid Android"
2007	The Bill	Tina Wilson	Episode: "Dicing with Danger"
2007	The Street	Mary Jennerson	Episode: "Twin"
2007	The Peter Serafinowicz Show	Various characters	Recurring role, 6 episodes
2010	Accused	Siobhan	Episode: "Helen's Story"
2011–2013	The Field of Blood	Trisha Meehan	4 episodes
2012	New Tricks	Mara Donaldson	Episode: "Dead Poets"
2012–2014	Pramface	Sandra Prince	Series regular, 17 episodes
2013	Shameless	Ronnie	Episode: "Kiss, Kiss, Bang, Bang"
2015	Moone Boy	Pat O'Dwyer	Episode: "The Plunder Years"
2015	You, Me and the Apocalypse	Larrson	Miniseries, 7 episodes
2017	Count Arthur Strong	Birdie	Recurring role, 6 episodes
2018	Genius	Berthe Weill	Episode: "Picasso: Chapter Two"
2019–2025	Brassic	Carol Dennings	Main cast
2020	Belgravia	Speer	Miniseries
2022	Derry Girls	As Herself	Guest appearance
2026	How to Get to Heaven from Belfast	Booker	4 episodes

=== Theatre ===
Year	Title	Role	Theatre
1991	The Patriot Game	Second Soldier	Abbey Theatre, Dublin
1992	A Crucial Week in the Life of a Grocer's Assistant	Agnes Smith	Abbey Theatre, Dublin
1992	The Iceman Cometh	Pearl	Abbey Theatre, Dublin
1994	Peer Gynt	Ingrid/Green-Clad Woman	Barbican Centre, London
1996	Portia Coughlan	Stacia Diyle	Abbey Theatre, Dublin & Royal Court Theatre, London
1997	The Caucasian Chalk Circle	Mother Georgia	Royal National Theatre, London
1999	The Street of Crocodiles	Adela	Queen's Theatre, London
2000	Dublin Carol	Mary	Royal Court Theatre, London
2000	Light	Adla	Almeida Theatre, London
2009	War Horse	Rose Narracott	New London Theatre, London
2009	Every Good Boy Deserve Favour	Teacher	Royal National Theatre, London
2011	The Faith Machine	Tatiana	Royal Court Theatre, London
2014	Seven	Mukhtaran Mai	Great Hall of Parliament, Belfast & The Guildhall, Derry
2017	Girl from the North Country	Mrs. Burke	The Old Vic, London & Noël Coward Theatre, London

== Awards and nominations ==
Year	Award	Category	Work	Result
2003	IFTA Awards	Best Actress in a Television Drama	Sinners	Nominated
2003	IFTA Awards	Best Actress in a Film	Spin the Bottle	Nominated
2004	Festival International de Programmes Audiovisuels	Best Actress	Holy Cross	Won
2004	Bodil Awards	Best Actress in a Supporting Role	Skagerrak	Nominated
2004	Robert Awards	Best Actress in a Supporting Role	Skagerrak	Nominated
2008	Golden Nymph Awards	Outstanding Actress in a Drama Series	The Street	Nominated
2012	IFTA Awards	Best Actress in a Supporting Role - Television	The Field of Blood	Nominated
2013	IFTA Awards	Best Actress in a Supporting Role - Film	Grabbers	Nominated
2020	IFTA Awards	Best Actress in Leading Role - Film	A Bump Along the Way	Nominated
