= Music for Claire Denis' High Life =

Film score by Stuart A. Staples
- Released: 5 April 2019
- Recorded: 2018–2019
- Genre: Film score
- Length: 60:04
- Label: Lucky Dog; City Slang; Milan

Stuart A. Staples chronology
Arrhythmia (2018)	High Life (2019)	Un Beau Soleil Interieur (2020)

Music for Claire Denis' High Life is the soundtrack to the 2018 film High Life directed by Claire Denis, starring Robert Pattinson. The album was released through Lucky Dog, City Slang and Milan Records on 5 April 2019, featuring 18 songs, including the score composed by Stuart A. Staples and an original song performed by the band Tindersticks featuring Pattinson.

== Development ==
The original score is composed by Stuart A. Staples from the band Tindersticks, in his eighth film with Denis. Staples wrote most of the music even before filming, as the discussions between him and Denis started way before 2012, where throughout the conversations, there were many ideas he wanted to explore and appreciated the foresight of Denis and the producers in offering him support and encouraging him to compose the score. Staples worked with his usual collaborats from the band, Dan McKinna, Neil Fraser and Earl Harvin, thereby providing him purely experimental recording sessions with David Coulter, Thomas Bloch, David Okumu, Julian Siegel, Seb Rochford and the BBC Chorus singers.

Staples approached High Life with the simple idea of creating random music, existing in a void like the constellations, something that was always hidden from a musician and they had only minimal or no information to play or react to as the recording had completed. The first piece completed was "The Yellow Light" for the earlier short film Contact (2014) which Denis co-directed it with Olafur Eliasson. For this each instrument and musical part, played into silence with arbitrary start points creating random movements and relationships when brought together. This procedure ran throughout the entire making of the score for High Life where musicians generally worked "in the darkness".

For "the void" itself, a series of hums and drones were created in the studio, where various instruments have been played, or feedback has created, or their notes being Sellotaped down to make the studio space resonate in different keys. Those stereo recordings were alive, working and changing with themselves, which infomred his experiences on creating the sound installation at the In Flanders Fields Museum in Ypres, where the studio hall vibrate and resonate with the evolving orchestral score. For the flashback sequences, Staples spent many consecutive nights recording in the rain waiting for the right intensity of heavy drops of rain falling from the guttering of the studio onto the carefully positioned paella pans below. As he wanted the music to be intimate and hypnotic, much of the score was made through hands and breath-acoustic instruments, electric guitars and fingertips.

The original song "Willow" was featured in the closing credits, sung by Dan McKinna, Staples and Robert Pattinson. The latter stated on his experience of Staples' singing voice which he liked, and was the first instance he recorded professionally at a studio, although he had sung for few films. Staples sang a demo of it which Pattinson tried to mimic as well as his singing accent, but Staples asked him to sing his own way, and practised the lyrics which Staples sang word by word. He considered the singing experience to be pleasant and wonderful.

== Release ==
The soundtrack was released through Lucky Dog, City Slang and Milan Records on 5 April 2019, the same day as the film's release. It was released in both digital and physical formats.

== Reception ==
Jim F of Backstreet Mafia wrote "Although not filled with songs in the traditional sense, Stuart A Staples has created an interesting, shrouded thing of beauty that's worth investing some time in." No More Workhorse described it "a good stop gap for Tindersticks fans, but also serves to underline that it's been 3 long years since the last 'proper' Tindersticks album." Sean Kitching of The Quietus wrote "Stuart Staples, better known for his work fronting the band Tindersticks, provides the soundtrack – for the most part a series of unsettling yet dreamlike drones devoid of vocalisation."

Matt Zoller Seitz of RogerEbert.com called it an "analog synthesizer-heavy soundtrack". David Ehrlich of IndieWire wrote "The pulsing electronic music of Tindersticks' frontman Stuart A. Staples tells us everything we need to know, accenting the film's ultra-low-fi aesthetic while also reminding us that these varyingly spiritualized ladies and gentleman are floating in space." Ian Freer of Empire called it "a discomfiting drone of a soundtrack by Tindersticks' Stuart Staples". Peter Bradshaw of The Guardian called it an "eerie musical score". Sophie Monks Kaufman of Little White Lies wrote "Stuart Staples' score stretches across the entire opus – past, present and future." Peter Travers of Rolling Stone called it "near-subliminal".

== Track listing ==
No.	Title	Length
1.	"The Garden"	2:26
2.	"Willow Lullaby"	1:58
3.	"System Report"	3:27
4.	"High Life Main Title"	1:31
5.	"River Flashback"	1:00
6.	"Fluids"	0:55
7.	"The F**k Box"	4:23
8.	"Bad Genes / Revolution"	2:56
9.	"Radiation"	2:03
10.	"Rape of Boyse"	4:06
11.	"Insemination"	4:31
12.	"Grow Baby, Grow"	0:55
13.	"Boyse's Death"	12:02
14.	"The Dog Ship"	3:15
15.	"Monte and Willow"	2:07
16.	"The Yellow Light"	1:17
17.	"Willow" (Tindersticks feat. Robert Pattinson)	5:23
18.	"The Black Hole" (Excerpt)	5:49
Total length:		60:04

== Accolades ==
Award	Date of ceremony	Category	Recipients	Result	Ref.
Film Fest Gent	19 October 2018	Georges Delerue Award	Stuart A. Staples	Won	
