= Songs for the Young at Heart =

Compilation album by Various Artists
- Released: 26 February 2007
- Genre: Children's music
- Label: V2
- Compiler: Stuart A. Staples, Dave Boulter

Professional ratings
Review scores
Source	Rating
The List	4/5 stars
Pitchfork Media	(6.7/10)

Songs for the Young at Heart is a children's music album put together by Stuart A. Staples and Dave Boulter, both from the band Tindersticks. It features a number of classic children's songs, stories, and nursery rhymes set to music, and features vocals from a number of famous artists.

Boulter states that the inspiration for the album came after the birth of his son, when:

"I began thinking of songs and nursery rhymes from my own childhood to play to him. I realised there was a lot of interesting and almost forgotten music, from the school room, the radio, and the television, that maybe was the reason I'd begun to make my own music in the first place."

Initial copies of the CD were accompanied by a hardback book containing artwork by Sexton Ming.

== Track listing ==
1. "Theme for the Young at Heart"
2. "Uncle Sigmund's Clockwork Storybook" - Robert Forster
3. "Florence's Sad Song" - Stuart Murdoch
4. "White Horses" - Cerys Matthews
5. "The Lion and Albert" - told by Jarvis Cocker
6. "Robinson Crusoe"
7. "Hushabye Mountain" - Stuart A. Staples
8. "Morningtown Ride" - Suzanne Osborne
9. "Inchworm" - Kurt Wagner
10. "Mary, Mungo & Midge"
11. "Puff the Magic Dragon" - Bonnie 'Prince' Billy and Red
12. "The 3 Sneezes" - read by Martin Wallace
13. "Hey, Don't You Cry" - Stuart A. Staples
