= Maria Doyle Kennedy =

Irish singer and actress

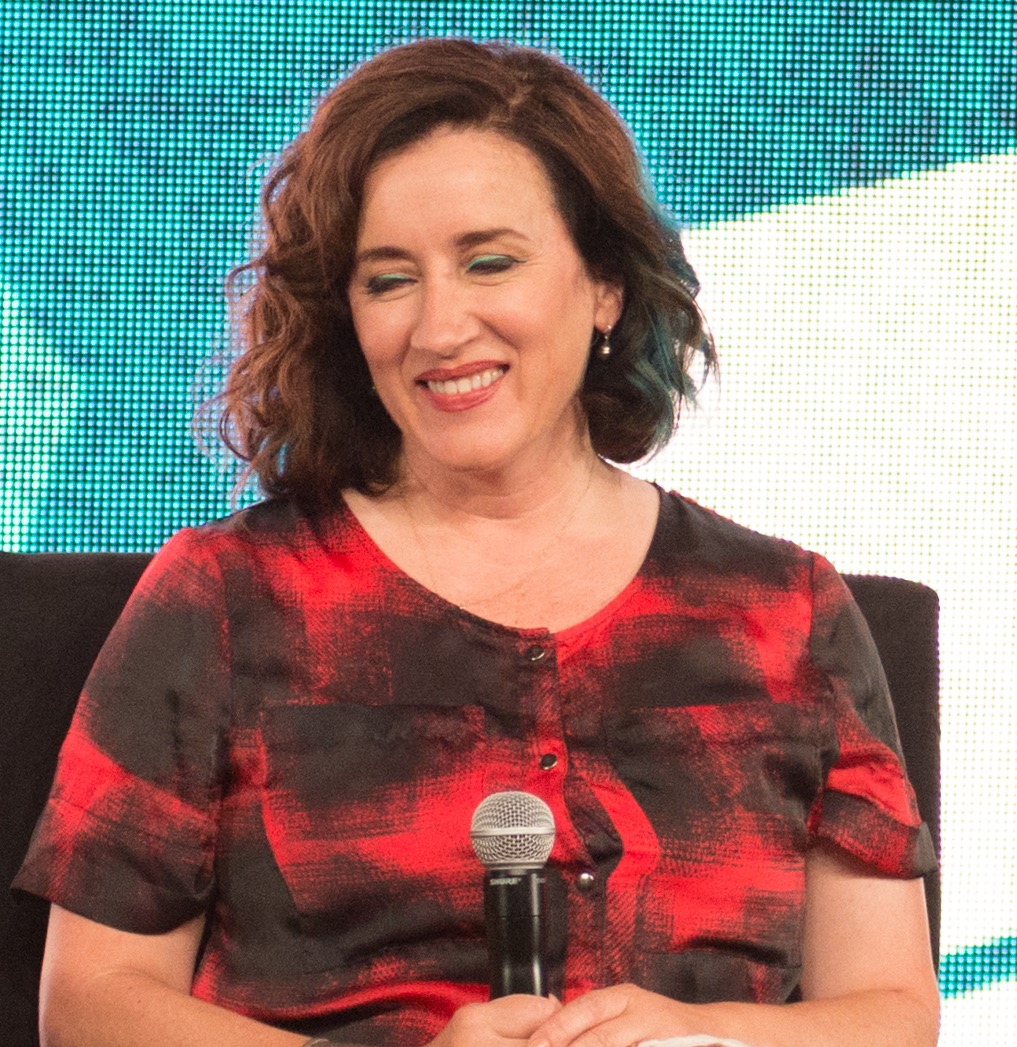
- Kennedy in 2014
- Born: Maria Josephine Doyle; 25 September 1964 (age 61); Clontarf, Dublin, Ireland
- Occupations: Singer; actress
- Years active: 1980s–present
- Spouse: Kieran Kennedy (m. 1988)
- Children: 4
- Musical career
- Genres: Folk; alternative folk; country folk; Appalachian; rock
- Instrument: Vocals
- Website: www.mariadk.com

Maria Josephine Doyle Kennedy (born 25 September 1964) is an Irish singer and actress. With a singing and acting career that has spanned more than 30 years, she has established herself as one of Ireland's most prolific artists and entertainers. As an actress, she is best known for her extensive television roles as Patsy in Father Ted (1998), Catherine of Aragon in The Tudors (2007–2010), Vera Bates in Downton Abbey (2011), Siobhán Sadler in Orphan Black (2013–2017), and Jocasta Cameron in Outlander (2018–2022). More recently in 2022, she starred as the Scottish journalist Tannie Maria in the series Recipes for Love and Murder, set in the Karoo in South Africa and adapted for the screen from the book of the same name by Sally Andrew.

Doyle Kennedy has also appeared in numerous films, including The Commitments (1991), The Matchmaker (1997), The General (1998), Miss Julie (1999), Tara Road (2005), Albert Nobbs (2011), Byzantium (2012), Jupiter Ascending (2015), Sing Street (2016), and The Conjuring 2 (2016). In 2020, she was listed as number 46 on The Irish Times list of Ireland's greatest film actors.

As a singer, Doyle Kennedy has released nine solo studio albums and two live albums, alongside two albums as a member of The Black Velvet Band.

== Early life ==
Doyle was born in Clontarf, Dublin, before moving with her parents, sister, and brother, Feargal, to Enniscorthy, County Wexford, for her father's career as a broker. They eventually settled in Bray, County Wicklow, and she still claims a close, personal connection with the town. She began singing early in life and comes from a family that appreciates "party pieces" and the tradition of gathering friends together with singing. Her first experience singing in public was at one of her parents' parties at the age of 13. She never considered a formal career in singing until after she graduated from Trinity College Dublin, with a joint honours degree in political science and business, and she never considered becoming an actress until after she established herself as a singer.

== Career ==
=== Music ===
Maria started The Black Velvet Band with her future husband, Kieran Kennedy and music quickly became a motivating force in her life. The band released their first album, When Justice Came, in 1989. Recorded in Los Angeles in 1989, it reached number four on the Irish charts and is ranked among the best Irish albums of the late 1980s. She then united with producers Clive Langer and Allen Winstanley to record her second Black Velvet Band album, King of Myself, in 1992.

The Lady Sings The Blues, a compilation album featuring Doyle Kennedy alongside Aretha Franklin, Billie Holiday, and Annie Lennox followed, and proved to be a best-selling album in 1994. It also established Doyle Kennedy in new markets throughout Europe, the U.S., and Japan. Touring Europe for the first time, she got rave reviews from The Guardian and The Times. She produced a documentary, Golden Boy, based on the life and work of Irish artist Patrick Scott, for which she specifically created the production company Mermaid Films. She has appeared as a broadcaster on Irish television, filling in for John Kelly on his Mystery Train show and for Tom Dunne on Pet Sounds. Doyle Kennedy also hosted an RTÉ musical series Borderline in the late 1980s.

After releasing music with The Black Velvet Band, Doyle Kennedy left the group to pursue a solo career in music. In 2001, Doyle Kennedy released music on Mermaid Records, a label she founded herself in 2000. Her debut solo album Charm was released in 2001, following the release of the two lead singles, "Stars Above" and "Babes". She coordinated Sirens, which is a compilation album of female artists and was released in 2003. In the same year, she performed on the first series of Other Voices. She released the album Skullcover for a limited time between 2004 and 2005. The album contained her covers of songs such as "Lovesong", "Video Killed the Radio Star", and "Still in Love with You".

Doyle Kennedy then released the alternative folk album Mütter in 2007 along with accompanying singles "Fuckability" and "Forty Days". After the release of "Fuckability", Hot Press praised the single and stated that Doyle Kennedy "is one of the finest voices this country has ever produced". She was subsequently nominated in the Best Irish Female category at the 2008 Meteor Awards. An accompanying DVD album for this record was also released in the same year. Entitled The Band of Maria's, it included exclusive live material from some of Doyle Kennedy's promotional tour venues. In 2011, Doyle Kennedy and her husband Kieran released a collaboration album entitled The Storms Are on the Ocean. The album features a collection of Appalachian folk and country songs. In the same year, Doyle Kennedy released La Sirena 1992-1997, a collection of rock-oriented tracks that had been recorded prior to her solo career. Her sixth album project, the folk-infused Sing, was released in September 2012 with Warner Music Group holding distribution rights to the album within the UK. In 2014 and 2015, Doyle Kennedy released two more albums: Maria Live, an album of songs performed live at Vicar Street and Pepper Canister Church, with her husband Kieran providing the instrumentation and production; and Mütter's Daughter, an album containing unreleased and re-released tracks from the album Mütter.

Doyle Kennedy worked with her husband to create a follow-up album to Sing. In 2015, she wrote a song entitled "Pride" as a response to the Irish Marriage Referendum of 2015. She also composed a song about the deaths of Michael Brown and Eric Garner in response to international media coverage of the Ferguson unrest and other police-related violence in the United States. Both songs are confirmed to be appearing on the record. "Pride", the first single from her self-titled ninth studio album, was released on 10 June 2017, with the album itself being released on 25 September.

Irish music magazine Hot Press called her "truly one of Ireland's greatest vocalists" and one of their "best-kept secrets", while BBC Music reviewer Andy Fyfe opined that Doyle Kennedy's "transcendence sets her apart from the avalanche of female singer-songwriters". Upon its release, Nicole Byrne of Shout4Music called Sing "one of the best Irish albums of the year – if not the best" and referred to Doyle Kennedy as a "Celtic angel". Her voice has been credited as one of Ireland's national treasures.

On 4 May 2021, Doyle Kennedy released her tenth studio album, Fire on the Roof of Eden.

=== Acting ===
Doyle Kennedy's first experience with acting came in 1991 when she played Natalie Murphy in the musical comedy-drama The Commitments. Director Alan Parker recruited her, and other established singers, for the film. An image of Doyle Kennedy in character as Natalie Murphy in the film The Commitments was featured on an Irish postage stamp as part of the Ireland 1996: Irish Cinema Centenary series issued by An Post. The image also includes her The Commitments co-stars Angeline Ball as Imelda Quirke, Bronagh Gallagher as Bernie McGloughlin, and Andrew Strong as Deco Cuffe.

She continued to expand her acting platform with roles in 1997 The Matchmaker, directed by Mark Joffe; John Boorman's 1998 crime drama film, The General, Alan Bleasdale's 1999 miniseries Oliver Twist, and the 1999 British television series Queer as Folk. In 2006, she received small-screen success in the television series Hide & Seek.

In 2007 and 2008, she received widespread recognition for her role as Katherine of Aragon on the British historical fiction television series The Tudors. In 2010, Doyle Kennedy portrayed Sonya, a nanny to Dexter Morgan's son Harrison in the fifth season of the Showtime crime drama series Dexter. She also appeared on Irish screens early in 2011 on TG4's Corp & Anam in her first Irish-language acting role. Also in 2011, she joined the cast of ITV's period drama series Downton Abbey, appearing as Vera Bates, estranged wife of the valet of the Earl of Grantham. In the same year, she also played a small role as a maid, Mary, in the period drama film Albert Nobbs, alongside American actress Glenn Close.

In 2012, Doyle Kennedy played a leading role in the ITV miniseries Titanic and also appeared beside fellow Irish actress Saoirse Ronan in Neil Jordan's horror fantasy film Byzantium, which premiered at the 2012 Toronto International Film Festival.

In 2013, Doyle Kennedy began co-starring in the Canadian science fiction thriller series Orphan Black, as Siobhán Sadler. She officially decided on joining the series when showrunner Graeme Manson mentioned that Patti Smith was the inspiration for her character. The series received critical acclaim, earning multiple accolades. She received a Canadian Screen Award for her role, from two nominations, and remained part of the main cast from the first season until the series' fifth and final season.

She reprised her leading role as Mairéad Mhic Iarnáin for the second series of Corp & Anam in 2014. She also appeared as Jupiter's mother Aleksa in The Wachowskis' 2015 science fiction action film Jupiter Ascending. In 2016, Doyle Kennedy starred as Penny in the musical comedy-drama film Sing Street, which made its debut at South by Southwest. She appeared in the 2016 sequel to the supernatural horror film The Conjuring, entitled The Conjuring 2.

On 12 April 2016, Doyle Kennedy was announced as having been cast as Roisin Kelly in the 2017 six-part miniseries Redwater.

In 2017, Doyle Kennedy was cast as Jocasta MacKenzie Cameron in the fourth season of the Starz historical romantic drama series Outlander, which is an adaptation of novel series of the same name by Diana Gabaldon. The season premiered in 2018 and she continued in the role for multiple seasons. Also in 2018, she starred as George Cusack in the second season of the RTÉ One drama series Striking Out, in which she appears as a series regular.

In 2020, Doyle Kennedy was cast as Ila in the epic fantasy drama series The Wheel of Time, which is an adaptation of Robert Jordan's novel series of the same name.

== Personal life ==
Doyle Kennedy first met musician Kieran Kennedy at a gig she was performing, and he subsequently invited her to sing on one of his demos. This event turned into a first date for the couple, and they married soon after in 1988. The couple have four sons.

Doyle Kennedy considers music to be the most integral aspect of her life, and she prefers her musical endeavours over her acting ones. She states "I do not miss acting when I am not doing it, but I would not spend a day without singing, even to myself." She still experiences nerves before she sings on stage, but she has learned ways to control them through pacing and breathing techniques. When acting, Doyle Kennedy is attracted to characters who are multifaceted and able to display not only a loving, motherly side but also a fierce, determined side.

== Influences ==
She draws musical influence from jazz musician Billie Holiday, American country singer John Prine (with whom she went on to duet on her Sing album), and fellow Irish folk musician Dónal Lunny, a close personal friend of hers, and has been referred to as "an Irish Patti Smith". Additionally, she draws acting influences from her personal heroes Maggie Smith and Penelope Wilton, with whom she starred on Downton Abbey. Irish artist Patrick Scott, one of Doyle Kennedy's dearest personal friends, also served as one of her biggest inspirations for her life, in general. She admired his ability to allow his life to inform his art and found inspiration in his sentiment that improvement, and not degradation, can still happen in old age.

== Discography ==
=== With The Black Velvet Band ===
==== Studio albums ====
List of studio albums
Title	Album details
When Justice Came	Release: 1989; Label: Mother Records; Formats: LP
King of Myself	Release: 1992; Label: Mother Records; Formats: LP

=== Solo ===
==== Studio albums ====
List of studio albums
Title	Album details
Charm	Release: August 2001; Label: Mermaid Records; Formats: CD, DL
Skullcover	Release: September 2004; Label: Mermaid Records; Formats: CD, DL
Mütter	Release: 18 May 2007; Label: Mermaid Records; Formats: CD, DL
The Storms Are on the Ocean	Release: 27 January 2011; Label: Mermaid Records; Formats: CD, DL
La Sirena 1992-1997	Release: 27 June 2011; Label: Mermaid Records; Formats: DL
Sing	Release: September 2012; Label: Mermaid Records; Formats: CD, DL
Mütter's Daughter	Release: June 2015; Label: Mermaid Records; Formats: DL
Maria DK	Release: 25 September 2017; Label: Mermaid Records; Formats: CD, DL
Fire on the Roof of Eden	Release: 4 May 2021; Label: Mermaid Records; Formats: CD, DL

==== Live albums ====
List of live albums
Title	Album details
Maria Live	Release: 17 March 2014; Label: Mermaid Records; Formats: CD, DL
Live at el Lokal	Release: 16 November 2018; Label: Mermaid Records; Formats: CD, DL

==== Compilation albums ====
List of compilation albums
Title	Album details
Sirens	Release: 2003; Label: Mermaid Records; Formats: CD

==== DVD albums ====
List of DVD albums
Title	Album details
The Band of Maria's (Live)	Release: January 2008; Label: Mermaid Records; Formats: DVD

==== Singles ====
List of singles
Title	Year	Album
"Stars Above"	2001	Charm
"Babes"	2001	Charm
"How You Remind Me"	2003	Even Better Than the Real Thing Vol. 1
"Fuckability"	2007	Mütter
"Forty Days"	2007	Mütter
"Have Yourself A Merry Little Christmas"	2009	Non-album single
"The Storms Are on the Ocean"	2011	The Storms Are on the Ocean
"Am I Choosing Right"	2012	Sing
"Yes We Will (feat. John Prine)"	2013	Sing
"Hola Luna (feat. Paul Brady)"	2013	Sing
"Sing (feat. Damien Rice)"	2014	Sing
"Stuck (Epic version)"	2015	Mütter's Daughter
"Stuck (Extended Indie version)"	2015	Mütter's Daughter
"Stuck (Orphan Black version)"	2015	Non-album single
"Pride"	2017	Maria Doyle Kennedy
"Keeps on Spinning"	2020	Non-album single
"Cyane"	2020	Non-album single
"And the Wind Just Cries"	2020	Non-album single
"Need a Little Luck in This Life"	2020	Non-album single
"Revenge is Sour"	2020	Non-album single
"L'Amour c'est nous"	2020	Non-album single

== Filmography ==
=== Film ===
Year	Title	Role	Notes
1991	The Commitments	Natalie Murphy	
1995	Nothing Personal	Ann	
1996	Moll Flanders	Alice	
1997	The Break	Roisin	
1997	The MatchMaker	Sarah Kelly	
1998	The General	Frances Cahil	
1999	I Could Read in the Sky	Maggie	
1999	Gregory's Two Girls	Bel	
1999	Miss Julie	Christine	
2003	Mystics	Foxy	
2004	Spin the Bottle	Anastasia	
2005	Tara Road	Rosemary Ryan	
2010	(She Owns) Every Thing	Object of Affection	Short film
2011	Albert Nobbs	Mary	
2012	After the Triumph of Your Birth	Sister Roisin	
2012	Byzantium	Morag	
2013	A Thousand Times Good Night	Theresa	
2013	Eliza Lynch: Queen of Paraguay	Eliza Lynch	
2015	Jupiter Ascending	Aleksa Jones	
2015	The Timber	Maggie	
2016	Sing Street	Penny Lawlor	
2016	The Conjuring 2	Peggy Nottingham	
2020	Wolfwalkers	Moll MacTíre	Voice

=== Television ===
Year	Title	Role	Notes
1998	Father Ted	Patsy	Episode: "Night of the Nearly Dead"
1999	DDU: District Detective Unit	Emma Pearson	2 episodes
1999	Oliver Twist	Irish Shop Assistant	Miniseries
1999–2000	Queer as Folk	Marie Threepwood	3 episodes
2000	The Fitz	Rita	Episode: "Dirty Book Deal"
2002	No Tears	Kitty Fogarty	Miniseries
2002	Home for Christmas	Cora Quirke	Television film
2003	Thursday the 12th	Nina Bannister	Television film
2005	Legless	Jenny	Television film
2006	Hide & Seek	Emma Holden	4 episodes
2006	Sorted	Roisin	6 episodes
2007–2010	The Tudors	Catherine of Aragon	17 episodes
2010	Dexter	Sonya	8 episodes
2011–2014	Corp & Anam	Mairéad Mhic Iarnáin	8 episodes
2011	Downton Abbey	Vera Bates	3 episodes
2012	Titanic	Muriel Batley	Miniseries
2013–2017	Orphan Black	Siobhán Sadler	40 episodes
2015	Call the Midwife	Attracta	Episode: "4.6"
2017	Redwater	Roisín Kelly	Miniseries
2018	Striking Out	George Cusack	6 episodes
2018−2022	Outlander	Jocasta MacKenzie Cameron	11 episodes
2020	Cold Courage	Suzie Hawkins	4 episodes
2021–2023	Kin	Bridget 'Birdy' Goggins	16 episodes
2021, 2025	The Wheel of Time	Ila	4 episodes
2022–present	Recipes for Love and Murder	Maria "Tannie Maria" Purvis	Main role
2024	Lost Boys and Fairies	Sandra	Miniseries

=== Music video ===
Year	Song	Artist	Role	Ref.
2017	"Century"	Feist (featuring Jarvis Cocker)	Adversary	

== Awards and nominations ==
Year	Association	Category	Work	Result
2002	Meteor Music Award	Best Irish Female	Herself	Nominated
2003	Irish Film & Television Award	Best Actress in a Film	Mystics	Nominated
2008	Meteor Music Award	Best Irish Female	Herself	Nominated
2008	Gemini Award	Best Performance by an Actress in a Featured Supporting Role in a Dramatic Series	The Tudors	Won
2008	Irish Film & Television Award	Best Actress in a Supporting Role in Television	The Tudors	Won
2009	Irish Film & Television Award	Best Actress in a Supporting Role in Television	The Tudors	Won
2009	Golden Nymph Award	Outstanding Actress – Drama Series	The Tudors	Nominated
2011	Screen Actors Guild Award	Outstanding Performance by an Ensemble in a Drama Series	Dexter	Nominated
2012	Irish Film & Television Award	Best Actress – Television	Corp & Anam	Nominated
2012	Irish Film & Television Award	Best Supporting Actress – Film	Albert Nobbs	Nominated
2014	Canadian Screen Award	Best Performance by an Actress in a Featured Supporting Role in a Dramatic Program or Series	Orphan Black	Won
2015	Irish Film & Television Award	Best Actress in a Lead Role – Drama	Corp & Anam	Nominated
2016	Canadian Screen Award	Best Performance by an Actress in a Featured Supporting Role in a Dramatic Program or Series	Orphan Black	Nominated
