= I've Forgotten What It Was in You (That Put the Need in Me) =

Single by Maria McKee

from the album Maria McKee
- B-side: "To Miss Someone"
- Released: 1989
- Length: 3:38
- Label: Geffen
- Songwriter(s): Maria McKee
- Producer(s): Mitchell Froom

Maria McKee singles chronology
"I've Forgotten What It Was in You (That Put the Need in Me)" (1989)	"To Miss Someone" (1989)

"I've Forgotten What It Was in You (That Put the Need in Me)" is the debut single by American singer-songwriter Maria McKee, released in 1989 from her debut studio album Maria McKee. It was written by McKee and produced by Mitchell Froom. "I've Forgotten What It Was in You" peaked at No. 29 on the Billboard Modern Rock Tracks chart on August 12, 1989.

== Background ==
In a 1991 interview with New Musical Express, McKee said of the song's lyrics, "It's funny but half the songs I write have nothing to do with love or even relationships. You're probably thinking about 'I've Forgotten What It Was in You (That Put the Need in Me)' and 'Can't Pull the Wool Down' but they're not real love songs. They're about working really hard at something that falls through and becoming disillusioned. They're about my career actually."

== Critical reception ==
Upon its release, Cash Box commented: "It's the right producer, it's the right singer, but it's the wrong song. Not bad, but far too nondescript to really make an impression." In a review of Maria McKee, Steve Terrell of The Santa Fe New Mexican described the song as "emotional" and a "good country-rock song" which "would easily fit the repertoires of Lacy J. Dalton or Reba McEntire." Jim Bohen of the Daily Record wrote: "McKee kicks up some dust with "I've Forgotten What It Was in You," [an] uptempo lament that could displace Highway 101 from the country charts." Len Righi of The Morning Call described the song as a "country rocker [that] k.d. lang would kill for."

Chuck Darrow of the Courier-Post considered the song "a rough-and-tumble tune driven by Bruce Brody's masterful Hammond organ, a subtle guitar riff and McKee's lustrous vocals." Holly Crenshaw of The Atlanta Journal-Constitution noted the "brutally honest lyrics that make Carole King's similar sentiments on "It's Too Late" sound banal by comparison". Eric McClary of the Reno Gazette-Journal wrote: "McKee spoils us right off the bat with "I've Forgotten What It Was in You," a heartbreakingly sensual "Dear John" letter." David Okamoto of the Tampa Bay Times described the song as a "tough, twangy number [that] echo[es] McKee's best work with Lone Justice."

== Track listing ==
7" single

1. "I've Forgotten What It Was in You (That Put the Need in Me)" - 3:38
2. "To Miss Someone" - 3:51

CD single (US promo)

1. "I've Forgotten What It Was in You (That Put the Need in Me)" - 3:38

== Personnel ==
Production

- Mitchell Froom - producer
- Bruce Brody - associate producer
- Tchad Blake - engineer
- Gary Gersh - executive producer

== Charts ==
Chart (1989)	Peak position
US Billboard Modern Rock Tracks	29
