= Breathe (Maria McKee song) =

Single by Maria McKee

from the album Maria McKee
- B-side: "Panic Beach"
- Released: January 14, 1991
- Length: 4:32
- Label: Geffen
- Songwriters: Maria McKee; Gregg Sutton
- Producer: Mitchell Froom

Maria McKee singles chronology
"Show Me Heaven" (1990)	"Breathe" (1991)	"Sweetest Child" (1992)

"Breathe" is a song by American singer-songwriter Maria McKee, released in January 1991 by Geffen Records as the fourth and final single from her debut studio album, Maria McKee (1989). It was written by McKee and Gregg Sutton, and produced by Mitchell Froom. "Breathe" reached No. 59 in the UK Singles Chart and remained in the Top 100 for two weeks. The song's music video was filmed in Carlow, south-east Ireland, and directed by Angela Conway.

== Background ==
In the UK, McKee originally intended to follow-up her number one hit "Show Me Heaven" with "To Miss Someone", a track from her debut album. The decision was then made to release "Breathe" instead as McKee wanted to "introduce people to the other side of what I do". She told Sounds in 1991, "I have a pretty distinctive sounding voice. I think maybe people responded to the voice on 'Show Me Heaven' and it's the same one on 'Breathe'. It's always good to surprise people too."

== Critical reception ==
Upon its release as a single in the UK, Stuart Bailie of New Musical Express considered "Breathe" to be "a more profound and anxious prospect" than its predecessor "Show Me Heaven" and "a wild description of lovers' empathy and personality transference". He added, "You want intensity? Here's the very one."

In a review of Maria McKee, Steve Terrell of The Santa Fe New Mexican noted the song's melody and "American Indian-style beat" being reminiscent of Patti Smith's "Ain't It Strange". He commented: "McKee's song is worthy of Patti herself. "Breathe" takes a wildly mystical look at love and sex. The song is about the spiritual grafting that takes place between true lovers and how spooky and wonderful that feeling can be." He also praised the guitar work of Richard Thompson, which he described as sounding "like a growling dragon, right on the verge of spewing fire." Steve Pick of the St. Louis Post-Dispatch described the song as "obsessively compelling" and "the album's highlight". He added, ""Breathe" [is] built on the tension among Thompson's patented dark modal guitar fills, Marotta's tom-tom rhythms and McKee's brooding vocals."

Sam Gnerre of The News-Pilot stated: "The eerily spare "Breathe" recalls Patti Smith at her most affecting, with a twisting guitar solo, echoed counter-harmonies and an ethereal violin solo." Holly Crenshaw of The Atlanta Journal-Constitution noted the "all-consuming intimacy" of the song, "heard in its quietly pulsing rhythm and painfully vulnerable lyrics". Greg Kot of the Chicago Tribune wrote: "McKee's voice is more glorious than ever, especially when it wraps itself around a melody as seductive as "Breathe"." Upon its release as a single in the UK in 1991, Steve Stewart of the Aberdeen Press and Journal picked the song as "single of the week" and commented: "Full of tension, with a sensual, soaring vocal delivering emotional lyrics. McKee is to the ballad what The Rolling Stones are to rock."

== Track listing ==
- 7" and cassette single
1. "Breathe" - 4:32
2. "Panic Beach" - 5:49
- 12" and CD single
1. "Breathe" - 4:32
2. "Panic Beach" - 5:49
3. "Drinkin' In My Sunday Dress" - 3:28

== Personnel ==
- Maria McKee - vocals
- Richard Thompson - guitar
- Steve Wickham - violin
- Jerry Marotta - drums

Production

- Mitchell Froom - producer
- Bruce Brody - associate producer
- Tchad Blake - engineer
- Gary Gersh - executive producer

Other

- Jeffrey Bender - photography

== Charts ==
Chart (1991)	Peak position
UK Singles (OCC)	59
UK Airplay (Music Week)	47
