= Mütter =

Studio album by Maria Doyle Kennedy
- Released: 2007
- Label: Mermaid

Maria Doyle Kennedy chronology
Skullcover (2004)	Mütter (2007)	The Storms Are on the Ocean (2011)

Mütter is the third studio album released by Maria Doyle Kennedy on Mermaid Records in 2007. It was produced and recorded by Kieran Kennedy and all songs were written by both Maria Doyle Kennedy and Kieran Kennedy. Other songwriters credited on the album include Dave Clarke, Peter O'Toole and Fergus O’Farrell. Maria Doyle Kennedy also illustrated the album's artwork.

== Background ==
According to Kennedy, Mütter focuses on patterns of behavior and relationships. In a 2007 interview for the Sunday Tribune Review, she said, “I just find human beings and the way they relate in groups of two or more endlessly astonishing." The album was recorded as a follow-up to her 2004 album, Skullcover.

Much of the album’s music was inspired by Chuck Palahniuk’s 2003 novel, Diary. Kennedy explained that the book, which tells the story of a woman named Misty, who is on the verge of a nervous breakdown.

“I would keep going back to the book, to Diary, for the atmospheric map,” Kennedy told the Sunday Business Post. ‘‘The album is not the kind of thing that would grab you and then be gone. It’d creep up on you, but stay longer and make you think. It’s slow-release and provocative in that way."

“The idea that our attention spans have shrunk to nothing and we should be making art to fill that is not acceptable to me,” she continued. “I think people are smarter than that and want more and deserve more. It doesn’t have to be all incredibly immediate."

== Reviews ==
Mütter was critically acclaimed, with the majority of critics praising it for its musicality, emotion and production. Commercially, the album’s debut single, "Fuckability," received little airplay because of its title. Both Today FM and RTÉ had issues with playing the song; Today FM would not play it during daytime hours and, upon the single’s release, RTÉ did not immediately include it on its playlist. In terms of the entire album, Mütter was listed as the “best thing she’s ever done by a mile” and Kennedy was hailed as one of Ireland’s best voices.

== Track listing ==
No.	Title	Writer(s)	Length
1.	"Unbelievable"	Maria Doyle Kennedy	2:21
2.	"Mother"	Maria Doyle Kennedy, Kieran Kennedy	5:29
3.	"Fuckability"	Maria Doyle Kennedy, Kieran Kennedy	3:05
4.	"Ghost Guitar"	Maria Doyle Kennedy, Kieran Kennedy	1:19
5.	"Skin"	Maria Doyle Kennedy, Kieran Kennedy	3:29
6.	"Call Me"	Maria Doyle Kennedy, Fergus O’Farrell	3:58
7.	"Here You Come"	Maria Doyle Kennedy, Peter O’Toole, Kieran Kennedy, Dave Clarke	2:11
8.	"Seven More Times"	Kieran Kennedy	4:35
9.	"Pattern"	Maria Doyle Kennedy, Kieran Kennedy, Dave Clarke, Peter O’Toole	2:36
10.	"Forty Days"	Maria Doyle Kennedy, Kieran Kennedy	3:47
11.	"Stuck"	Maria Doyle Kennedy, Kieran Kennedy	3:56
12.	"Opera"	Maria Doyle Kennedy, Dave Clarke, Kieran Kennedy	3:37
13.	"Swoon"	Maria Doyle Kennedy, Kieran Kennedy	5:34

== Personnel and production ==
- Maria Doyle Kennedy – vocals
- Kieran Kennedy – record producer, mixer
- Herbie Macken – producer, mixer
- Redman AKA – design
