= Lucky Dog Recordings 03–04 =

Studio album by Stuart A. Staples
- Released: 2005
- Recorded: 2003–2004
- Genre: Chamber pop
- Label: Lucky Dog Recordings

Stuart A. Staples chronology
Lucky Dog Recordings 03–04 (2005)	Leaving Songs (2006)

Professional ratings
Review scores
Source	Rating
Allmusic	4/5 stars

Lucky Dog Recordings 03–04 is the debut solo album by Tindersticks frontman Stuart A. Staples, released in 2005 on the Lucky Dog label. The album features contributions from Terry Edwards and Yann Tiersen, alongside some of Staples' Tindersticks colleagues. The first track, "Somerset House", featured in the closing credits of the fourth episode of Eastbound & Down, in 2009.

== Track listing ==
1. "Somerset House"
2. "Marseilles Sunshine"
3. "Say Something Now"
4. "Friday Night"
5. "Shame on You"
6. "Untitled"
7. "Dark Days"
8. "People Fall Down"
9. "She Don't Have to be Good to Me"
10. "I've Come a Long Way"
