= I'm Gonna Soothe You =

1993 single by Maria McKee

Single by Maria McKee

from the album You Gotta Sin to Get Saved
- B-side: "Why Wasn't I More Grateful (When Life Was Sweet)"
- Released: May 10, 1993
- Length: 3:36
- Label: Geffen
- Songwriters: Maria McKee; Marvin Etzioni; Bruce Brody
- Producer: George Drakoulias

Maria McKee singles chronology
"Sweetest Child" (1992)	"I'm Gonna Soothe You" (1993)	"I Can't Make It Alone" (1993)

Music video
- "I'm Gonna Soothe You" on YouTube

"I'm Gonna Soothe You" is a song by American singer-songwriter Maria McKee, released in May 1993 by Geffen Records as the lead single from her second studio album, You Gotta Sin to Get Saved (1993). The song was written by McKee, Marvin Etzioni and Bruce Brody, and produced by George Drakoulias. It reached No. 35 in the UK and remained on the UK Singles Chart for three weeks. The accompanying music video was directed by English film, documentary and music video director Julien Temple. It achieved play on Power Play Music Video Television and VH1.

== Critical reception ==
Upon its release as a single, Larry Flick from Billboard magazine described "I'm Gonna Soothe You" as a "swaying, '70s-fashioned slow-rock number". He noted that listeners will be "soothed by the Motown influences" and added that "it's easy to imagine folks devouring this sound". A reviewer from Cash Box noted its "steady rocking reassurance", adding that "the singer's crystal-line vocals cut straight to the heart". Pan-European magazine Music & Media considered it a "marked change of direction" for McKee, with which she "goes Stax R&B, and Black Crowes producer Drakoulias pushe[s] the right buttons".

In the UK, Ian Gittins of Melody Maker was critical of the song, stating it was "not her finest moment". He commented, "McKee on stage is transcendent, a real wild child, crazy-eyed and howling for glee. But this shoulder-heaving ballad's AOR arrangements confine her natural lust for life." Stuart Bailie of NME was more positive of the song, writing, "It's like an old Memphis stew, with attractive brass bits, gospel voices and the minor chords in joyful places, plus Maria ripping it up with style. Sometimes you wish she'd blast away a bit more, like she does on stage, but this isn't bad."

In a review of You Gotta Sin to Get Saved, Musician said, "The album opens with "I'm Gonna Soothe You," a mid-tempo ballad with enough 70s-redolent strings and horns that you might check to make sure the CD doesn't have a Hi insignia."

== Track listings ==
- CD single (UK release)
1. "I'm Gonna Soothe You (LP Version)" - 3:35
2. "Why Wasn't I More Grateful (When Life Was Sweet) (LP Version)" - 5:05
3. "This Thing (Don't Lead To Heaven)" - 3:31
- CD single (UK limited edition release)
1. "I'm Gonna Soothe You (LP Version)" - 3:35
2. "If Love Is a Red Dress, Hang Me in Rags (Acoustic Demo Version)" - 4:57
3. "Show Me Heaven (Acoustic Demo Version)" - 3:40
- CD single (French release)
1. "I'm Gonna Soothe You (LP Version)" - 3:35
2. "Why Wasn't I More Grateful (When Life Was Sweet) (LP Version)" - 5:05
3. "Show Me Heaven (Acoustic Demo Version)" - 3:40
- Cassette single (UK release)
1. "I'm Gonna Soothe You (LP Version)" - 3:35
2. "Why Wasn't I More Grateful (When Life Was Sweet) (LP Version)" - 5:05

== Personnel ==
- Maria McKee - lead vocals
- Edna Wright, Julia Waters, Maxine Waters - backing vocals
- George Drakoulias - producer

Other

- Dennis Hopper - photography
- Janet Wolsborn - art direction

== Charts ==
Chart (1993)	Peak position
Australia (ARIA)	160
Canada Top Singles (RPM)	49
Canada Adult Contemporary (RPM)	34
Europe (European Hit Radio)	28
Iceland (Íslenski Listinn Topp 40)	33
UK Singles (OCC)	35
UK Airplay (Music Week)	45
Quebec (ADISQ)	42
