= Asphalt Ribbons =

English rock band

- Origin: Nottingham, England
- Years active: 1987–1991
- Labels: In-Tape; Rough Trade

Asphalt Ribbons were an English rock band that formed in Nottingham in 1987.

The original line-up was Stuart Staples, Gaynor Backhouse, Gary Watt and Rob Howard. Dave Boulter (organ and accordion) replaced Rob Howard in 1989 and Will Carless (drums) also joined in 1989, just before they released their first EP, The Orchard, on the In-Tape label. Neil Fraser was yet also listed as author on the song "Over Again" in the liner notes of the EP. Tracks on The Orchard were "Over Again", "Red Sauce", "Greyhound" and "I Used to Live There". In-Tape also released a radio promo copy of "Over Again" in 1989.

Sounds listed them as a 'name for 1990' and in the same week Melody Maker was touting them as "the first new band of this year to make the indie/mainstream crossover".

During the course of 1990, Asphalt Ribbons became a six-piece, acquiring Craig Chettle (guitar). They also recorded Good Love, their second EP for In-Tape, which was produced by Jon Langford. The artwork for both EPs was by Wolfgang Buttress.

In 1991, the band relocated to London and shifted position again, this time to the pre-Tindersticks line-up featuring Stuart Staples (vocals), David Boulter (organ and accordion), Neil Fraser (guitar), Dickon Hinchliffe (guitar and strings), Al Macaulay (percussion and drums) and John Thompson (bass). They recorded "Tiger Lily" (1991), "Passion, Coolness, Indifference ..." (1991) and Old Horse (1991) for Rough Trade.

In 1992 a promotional video for "Downside" (ETT Records) was made.

It is known that the Asphalt Ribbons played live some early versions of songs, that later became Tindersticks songs, e.g. "For Those...", "A Sweet Sweet Man", "Blood", "Drunk Tank" and "Big Silence" (known as "Raindrops" in the Tindersticks repertoire).

Mark Colwill replaced John Thomson in the last days before Asphalt Ribbons became Tindersticks. Mark was recruited when John left but it is not sure if he played any gigs under the Asphalt Ribbons name. They then changed their name to Tindersticks after Stuart discovered a box of German matches on a Greek beach.

Their sound is more country-influenced than Tindersticks, but already features the distinctive vocals of Stuart Staples.

== Discography ==
=== Albums ===
- Old Horse (1991, Rough Trade)

=== Singles and EPs ===
- The Orchard E.P. (1989, In-Tape)
- Good Love (1990, In-Tape)
- Passion, Coolness, Indifference, Boredom, Mockery, Contempt, Disgust An E.P. (1991, Tiger Lily)
