= Live in Hamburg (Maria McKee album) =

Live album by Maria McKee
- Released: May 10, 2004
- Recorded: October 5, 2003 at Kampnagel, Hamburg, Germany by NDR Radio
- Genre: Rock
- Length: 63:02
- Label: VF/Little Diva Music

Maria McKee chronology
High Dive (2003)	Live in Hamburg (2004)	Peddlin' Dreams (2005)

Professional ratings
Review scores
Source	Rating
AllMusic	3.5/5 stars

Live in Hamburg is the fifth album by American singer-songwriter Maria McKee, released in 2004 (see 2004 in music).

== Track listing ==
All songs by Maria McKee, except where noted

1. "This Perfect Dress" – 5:27
2. "Scarlover" – 6:37
3. "High Dive" – 5:17
4. "T.V. Teens" – 5:13
5. "Be My Joy" – 5:42
6. "I'm Awake" – 4:11
7. "Absolutely Barking Stars" – 5:05
8. "Breathe" (McKee, Gregg Sutton) – 4:17
9. "Something Similar" – 8:50
10. "Life Is Sweet" – 12:23

== Personnel ==
- Maria McKee – guitar, vocals

== Production ==
- Cover photo: Lauren Abrahams
- Photography: Jim Akin
