= Late December =

Studio album by Maria McKee
- Released: April 24, 2007
- Genre: Rock
- Length: 42:59
- Label: Cooking Vinyl
- Producer: Maria McKee, Jim Akin

Maria McKee chronology
Peddlin' Dreams (2005)	Late December (2007)	La Vita Nuova (2020)

Professional ratings
Review scores
Source	Rating
AllMusic	4.5/5 stars

Late December is Maria McKee's sixth solo album, released in 2007. The album contains the single "A Good Heart", a song McKee had written over 20 years earlier but had never released. Feargal Sharkey had a U.K. No. 1 with the song in 1985.

== Track listing ==
All songs written by Maria McKee, except where noted.

No.	Title	Writer(s)	Length
1.	"Late December"	Jim Akin, McKee	3:03
2.	"No Other Way To Love You"	Akin, McKee	3:39
3.	"A Good Heart"		4:11
4.	"Power On, Little Star"		3:58
5.	"Too Many Heroes"		3:37
6.	"Destine"		4:22
7.	"My First Night Without You"		4:05
8.	"Scene of the Affair"	McKee, Akin	3:44
9.	"Cat in the Wall"		2:34
10.	"One Eye On The Sky (One On The Grave)"	McKee, Akin	4:39
11.	"Bannow"		1:08
12.	"Starving Pretty"		4:11

== Personnel ==
- Maria McKee – guitar, keyboards, piano, vocals
- Jerry Andrews – guitar
- Jim Akin – keyboards, guitar, bass, lap steel guitar
- Tom Dunne – drums, percussion

== Charts ==
Chart performance for Late December
Chart (2007)	Peak position
UK Independent Albums (OCC)	36
