= Maria McKee (album) =

Studio album by Maria McKee
- Released: June 1989
- Genre: Country rock
- Length: 44:43
- Label: Geffen
- Producer: Mitchell Froom

Maria McKee chronology
Maria McKee (1989)	You Gotta Sin to Get Saved (1993)

Maria McKee is the debut studio album by American singer-songwriter Maria McKee, released in 1989.

== Production ==
The songwriting was inspired in part by books about the history of vaudeville, as well as by Tennessee Williams plays.

== Critical reception ==
Professional ratings
Review scores
Source	Rating
AllMusic	3/5 stars
The Encyclopedia of Popular Music	3/5 stars
Hi-Fi News & Record Review	A:1*
MusicHound Rock: The Essential Album Guide	3/5 stars
New Musical Express	10/10
The Rolling Stone Album Guide	4/5 stars

The Washington Post's Joe Brown called the album "stunning", writing that "aside from her luminous singing, the real success story of McKee's solo album is her songwriting, highly developed and ambitious, full of melodic and rhythmic variety." Chris Willman writing for the Los Angeles Times stated the album "presents Maria McKee the person as something of an introspective, even introverted loner reeling from a romantic split." Ira Robbins considered McKee's "lyrics don't reveal any clear artistic mission and Mitchell Froom's overstylized production ... drowns and/or drains her personality out of the album, leaving characterless elegance instead of a strong statement."

Oscar Wednesday of Cashbox was disappointed by this record. He wrote: "I really wanted to love this album. As far as I'm concerned Maria McKee is one of the most talented and exciting singers around today. No, honest. But after listening to the album repeatedly, I found myself anything but captivated. Lone Justice's second and final album, 1986's Shelter, was unfocused and awkward, and although this solo outing stands head-and-shoulders above that effort, it too feels a little unnatural."

Terry Staunton, writing for New Musical Express, felt that McKee's decision to work with "the elite of American sessions musicians" produced "astonishing results" and suggested the album "has to be one of the best records of the year". He praised McKee's "honey roast vocals" for "matching the frail passion of Patsy Cline, the fiery soul of Aretha Franklin and the forceful blues of Janis Joplin". Staunton added, "Maria's always been able to pen a good tune and here you'll hear nine of her best." NME placed the album at No. 9 on its 1989 albums of the year list. Ian Gittins of Melody Maker summarised, "Maria McKee is country, is blues, is soul, is rock 'n' roll, but is always one delicious demon possessed by the spirit of her songs. I defy you to hear this and not fall in love."

== Track listing ==
All songs written by Maria McKee, except where noted.

No.	Title	Writer(s)	Length
1.	"I've Forgotten What It Was in You (That Put the Need in Me)"		3:41
2.	"To Miss Someone"		3:52
3.	"Am I the Only One (Who's Ever Felt This Way?)"		2:56
4.	"Nobody's Child"	McKee, Robbie Robertson	3:58
5.	"Panic Beach"		5:55
6.	"Can't Pull the Wool Down (Over the Little Lamb's Eyes)"		3:45
7.	"More Than a Heart Can Hold"	Bruce Brody, McKee	4:29
8.	"This Property Is Condemned"	Brody, McKee, Patrick Sugg, Gregg Sutton	4:44
9.	"Breathe"	McKee, Sutton	4:39
10.	"Has He Got a Friend for Me?"	Richard Thompson	3:32
11.	"Drinkin' in My Sunday Dress"		3:27

== Personnel ==
- Maria McKee – acoustic guitar, guitar, piano, vocals
- Alex Acuña – percussion
- Bruce Brody – conductor, keyboard, Hammond organ
- Shane Fontayne – guitar
- Mitchell Froom – keyboard
- Heart Attack Horns – horn
- Jim Keltner – drums
- Tony Levin – bass guitar
- Jerry Marotta – drums
- Sid Page – concert master
- Philip Pickett – recorder, crumhorn
- James Ralston – guitar
- Marc Ribot – guitar
- Jerry Scheff – bass
- Greg Sutton – vocals
- Richard Thompson – guitar, mandolin
- Steve Wickham – fiddle

Production

- Mitchell Froom – producer
- Gary Gersh – executive producer
- Bruce Brody – associate producer
- Tchad Blake – engineer
- Ed Goodreau – assistant engineer
- Mike Kloster – assistant engineer
- Randy Staub – assistant engineer
- Randy Wine – assistant engineer
- Scott Woodman – assistant engineer
- Bob Ludwig – mastering
- Bruce Brody – arranger
- Gabrielle Raumberger – art direction
- Maria DeGrassi – design
- Deborah Frankel – photography

== Charts ==
Chart (1989)	Peak position
Australian Albums (ARIA)	117
UK Albums (Official Charts)	49
US Billboard 200	120
US Cash Box Top 200 Albums	122
New Zealand Albums (RMNZ)	37
