= High Dive =

Studio album by Maria McKee
- Released: April 2003
- Studio: Rosehill House, Viewfinder Studios, Zeitgeist
- Genre: Alternative rock
- Length: 54:54
- Label: Viewfinder
- Producer: Jim Akin, Maria McKee

Maria McKee chronology
Life Is Sweet (1996)	High Dive (2003)	Live in Hamburg (2004)

Professional ratings
Review scores
Source	Rating
AllMusic	4.5/5 stars

High Dive is the fourth album by American singer-songwriter Maria McKee, released in 2003.

== Track listing ==
All songs written by Maria McKee, except where noted.

No.	Title	Writer(s)	Length
1.	"To the Open Spaces"	Jim Akin, McKee	3:13
2.	"Life Is Sweet"		3:49
3.	"After Life"	Bruce Brody, McKee	1:33
4.	"Be My Joy"		4:14
5.	"High Dive"		4:02
6.	"My Friend Foe"		3:40
7.	"In Your Constellation"		4:19
8.	"Love Doesn't Love"	Jim Akin, McKee	4:15
9.	"We Pair Off"		4:39
10.	"No Gala"		1:56
11.	"Non Religious Building"	Jim Akin, McKee	5:09
12.	"Something Similar"		5:40
13.	"From Our T.V. Teens to the Tomb"		4:29
14.	"Worry Birds"		3:56

== Personnel ==
- Maria McKee – vocals, guitar, keyboards, arranger, producer
- Jim Akin – vocals, lap steel guitar, bass guitar, keyboards, arranger, producer, engineer
- Chris Bleth – saxophone
- Richard Dodd – cello
- Tom Dunne – drums, percussion
- Dennis Farias – trumpet
- Terry Glenny – violin
- Eric Gorfain – violin, conductor, arranger
- Nick Lane – trombone
- Stephanie Mijanovich – French horn

Production

- Producers: Jim Akin, Maria McKee
- Mixing: Jim Akin
- Mastering: Jim Akin
- Arrangers: Jim Akin, Maria McKee
- Horn arrangements: Jim Akin, Maria McKee
- String arrangements: Jim Akin, Eric Gorfain, Maria McKee
- Art direction: Jim Akin, Maria McKee
- Paintings: Maria McKee
- Artwork: Kevin Robinson
- Photography: Jim Akin

== Charts ==
Chart (2003)	Peak position
US Independent Albums (Billboard)	47
Swedish Albums (Sverigetopplistan)	56
UK Independent Albums (OCC)	39
