= Sweetest Child =

1992 song by Maria McKee

Single by Maria McKee
- Released: 1992
- Length: 4:06
- Label: Geffen
- Songwriters: Maria McKee; Bruce Brody; Martin Glover
- Producer: Youth

Maria McKee singles chronology
"Breathe" (1991)	"Sweetest Child" (1992)	"I'm Gonna Soothe You" (1993)

"Sweetest Child" is a song recorded as a collaboration between American singer-songwriter Maria McKee and English record producer Youth. It was released in 1992 by Geffen Records as a non-album single and reached No. 45 in the UK Singles Chart. "Sweetest Child" was written by McKee, Bruce Brody and Youth, and produced by Youth.

In a press release for the single, "Sweetest Child" was described as being about "an ultimate sensual experience of epic love that knows no boundaries".

== Critical reception ==
Upon its release, Roger Morton of NME chose "Sweetest Child" as the magazine's "single of the week", praising McKee and Youth as "a perfect combination" and the song as a "sentimental, bloodkiss ballad that hits you with an overpowering tidal wave of wonderful slush". He noted the "descending bass line" and "slow-mo pounding beat" which "lead into a cascading melody which, when it hits the chorus break, is completely heart-transplanting", and how McKee "lets her lungs fill with tears", Youth "lets the brazen wank-off guitars fly into the firmament" and "members of Primal Scream and James are let into the studio to get in on the act". He concluded, "Part rave anthem, part unapologetic MOR ballad, part 'Whiter Shade of Pale' and part 'Sunshine on a Rainy Day', it's the best thing Annie Lennox hasn't done in years." The Stud Brothers, writing for Melody Maker, felt that Youth produces McKee "to surprisingly evocative effect here". They commented, "Youth's just got a great way with a beat, he can make bass sound at once mellifluous and insistent and here he does precisely that. And McKee can, when she's not rocking out, sound genuinely spacey and weird. In this mood she's a refreshing change from the camp soul divas Youth often collaborates with." They added that the song is "somewhat marred by the regrettable if sporadic appearance of some fiddly fretmanship but, overall, it works".

Alan Jones of Music Week described it as a song which "sets McKee in a challenging dance rock setting". He wrote, "[Her] exceptional vocals are the centrepiece, but Youth surrounds her with enough atmospheric and smacking dance signatures to carry this one deep into the same crossover territory as U2's current hit." Jim Lawn of the Lennox Herald praised it as "a more vibrant change of style" for McKee, with "surprising production from Youth who is more noted for dance remixes". Penny Kiley of the Liverpool Echo noted it was "different from McKee's usual style". She added, "It's a larger than life love song with a big passionate sound and the dance music approach actually suits her voice quite well." Newcastle Evening Chronicle wrote, "Beautifully phrased performance on a ballad with underlying power." Phil Bryant of Crawley's The News noted McKee's "gorgeous voice" on the track.

== Track listing ==
- 7" and cassette single
1. "Sweetest Child" (7" Version) – 4:06
2. "Accapella Sweetest Child" – 4:23
- 12" single
1. "Sweetest Child" (Extended Mix) – 7:50
2. "Sweetest Child" (Accapella) – 4:23
3. "Sweetest Child" (Celtic Moon Mix) – 7:48
4. "Sweetest Child" (Trans Tribal Ritual Stomp) – 5:49
- CD single
1. "Sweetest Child" (7" Version) – 4:06
2. "Sweetest Child" (Full Moon Mix) – 7:44
3. "Accapella Sweetest Child" – 4:23
4. "Sweetest Child" (Trans Tribal Ritual Stomp) – 5:49

== Personnel ==
- Maria McKee – vocals
- Robert Young – guitar
- Bruce Brody – keyboards
- Youth – bass
- Saul Davies – violin, percussion
- Nick Burton – drums
- Cyrung – didgeridoo on "Trans Tribal Ritual Stomp"

Production

- Youth – producer, mixing
- Mark 'Spike' Stent, Christopher Marc Potter – engineers
- Matt Austin – programming

Other

- Me Company – cover design

== Charts ==
Chart (1992)	Peak position
Netherlands (Single Top 100)	60
Netherlands (Tipparade)	11
UK Singles (OCC)	45
UK Airplay (Music Week)	16
