= La Vita Nuova (album) =

Studio album by Maria McKee
- Released: March 13, 2020
- Length: 64:19
- Label: Fire

Maria McKee chronology
Late December (2007)	La Vita Nuova (2020)

La Vita Nuova is the seventh studio album by American singer-songwriter Maria McKee. It was released on March 13, 2020, under Fire Records.

== Critical reception ==
Professional ratings
Aggregate scores
Source	Rating
Metacritic	80/100
Review scores
Source	Rating
AllMusic	4.5/5 stars
The Guardian	2/5 stars
MusicOMH	4/5 stars
Pitchfork	7.7/10

La Vita Nuova was met with generally favorable reviews from critics. At Metacritic, which assigns a weighted average rating out of 100 to reviews from mainstream publications, this release received an average score of 80, based on 7 reviews.

== Track listing ==
La Vita Nuova track listing
No.	Title	Length
1.	"Effigy of Salt"	4:08
2.	"Page of Cups"	3:40
3.	"Let Me Forget"	4:22
4.	"I Should Have Looked Away"	3:34
5.	"Right Down to the Heart of London"	6:48
6.	"La Vita Nuova"	3:46
7.	"Little Beast"	3:04
8.	"Courage"	7:21
9.	"Ceann Bró"	4:38
10.	"The Last Boy"	4:49
11.	"I Never Asked"	5:06
12.	"I Just Want to Know If You're Alright"	3:59
13.	"Weatherspace"	3:41
14.	"However Worn"	5:23

== Charts ==
Chart performance for La Vita Nuova
Chart (2020)	Peak position
Scottish Albums (OCC)	34
UK Americana Albums (OCC)	1
UK Independent Albums (OCC)	14
UK Album Sales (OCC)	44
