= Leaving Songs (Stuart A. Staples album) =

Studio album by Stuart A. Staples
- Released: 2006
- Recorded: 2005
- Genre: Chamber pop, alternative country
- Length: 36:57
- Label: Beggars Banquet
- Producer: Stuart A. Staples

Stuart A. Staples chronology
Lucky Dog Recordings 03-04 (2005)	Leaving Songs (2006)

Professional ratings
Aggregate scores
Source	Rating
Metacritic	81/100
Review scores
Source	Rating
AllMusic	4/5 stars
Mojo	4/5 stars
musicOMH	4/5 stars
NME	8/10
Pitchfork	7.7/10
PopMatters	7/10
The Skinny	3/5 stars
Stylus	B+
Tiny Mix Tapes	3.5/5 stars
Uncut	8/10

Leaving Songs is an album by Stuart A. Staples, released on the Beggars Banquet label in 2006. The album features duets with Lhasa de Sela and Maria McKee, as well as a contribution from Terry Edwards.

== Track listing ==
1. "Goodbye to Old Friends" – 6:13
2. "There Is a Path" – 3:53
3. "Which Way the Wind" – 3:11
4. "This Road is Long" – 3:44 (duet with Maria McKee)
5. "One More Time" – 3:16
6. "Dance With an Old Man" – 2:09
7. "That Leaving Feeling" – 4:02 (duet with Lhasa)
8. "Already Gone" – 3:32
9. "This Old Town" – 4:00
10. "Pulling In to the Sea" – 2:57

All songs written by Stuart A. Staples.
