= The Troubles in Ardoyne =

Incidents in Ardoyne, Northern Ireland during the Troubles

The Troubles in Ardoyne lists incidents during the Troubles in the Ardoyne district of Belfast, Northern Ireland.

== 1971 ==
- 5 February: A 28-year-old civilian Bernard "Barney" Watt was fatally shot in the chest by a British soldier at around 11 p.m. during a riot, the soldiers claimed Watt had attempted to throw a bomb, although witnesses provided evidence that showed that Watt had his hands up when he was shot. In 2017 a coroner found that Watt wasn't a part of any paramilitary organization and ruled that his death was unjustified.
- 15 February: A British soldier was shot in the head and killed by an IRA sniper while taking part in a mobile-patrol in Ardoyne. Two British Army scout cars came under sniper fire and had a bomb thrown at them.
- 23 August: A British soldier was shot dead by an IRA sniper on Flax Street in the Ardoyne area. The soldier was shot in the head as he exited a British armoured vehicle.
- 17 September: A British soldier was shot dead by an IRA sniper while on foot-patrol in Ardoyne.
- 1 October: A British soldier was shot dead in an IRA gun-attack on a British Army foot-patrol in the Ardoyne area.
- 21 December 1971: An unarmed IRA volunteer was shot after being captured by the British Army in Ardoyne.

== 1972 ==
- 18 May: A British soldier was shot dead by an IRA sniper on Flax Street.
- 23 July: An Ulster Defence Regiment (UDR) soldier was kidnapped and shot dead by the IRA in Ardoyne.
- 14 August: A civilian was killed in the crossfire between an IRA unit and a British patrol in the Ardoyne area.
- 30 September: A British soldier was shot dead by an IRA sniper in Ardoyne.

== 1973 ==
- 28 February: A British soldier was killed in an IRA gun attack on a patrol in the Ardoyne area.
- 17 April 1973: An IRA volunteer was shot dead by a British Army sniper while standing talking with a number of men in Ardoyne.
- 10 June: The Ulster Defence Association (UDA) shot dead a Catholic civilian in the Deerpark Road area adjacent to Ardoyne.

== 1974 ==
- 25 November: The UDA shot dead a Protestant civilian outside Ewart's Mill. They had assumed he was a Catholic.

== 1975 ==
- 5 April: The Ulster Volunteer Force (UVF) shot dead a Catholic civilian as he walked home at Etna Drive.
- 2 May: The IRA shot dead a UDA member at his workplace, Ardoyne Bus Depot, on Ardoyne Road.

== 1976 ==
- 10 March: The IRA shot dead Sammy Smyth (former UDA spokesman) on Alliance Avenue.
- 13 March: An ex-British soldier was shot dead on Alliance Avenue.
- 5 June: The UDA carried out a drive-by shooting at the Crumlin Star Bar in Brompton Park. A Catholic civilian died of his wounds two days later. An RUC detective said it was a random sectarian attack.
- 24 October: Two British soldiers were killed when an IRA sniper team ambushed a British patrol in Ardoyne.

== 1977 ==
- 20 April: Two Catholic civilians were killed when the UVF exploded a bomb at the funeral of a Provisional IRA volunteer on Etna Drive.
- 27 February: An ex-British soldier was shot dead by the IRA in the Ardoyne area.
- 17 April: An IRA volunteer was shot dead by a British Army sniper on Flax Street.
- 28 August: A British soldier was shot dead by an IRA sniper while on foot patrol in the Ardoyne area.

== 1979 ==
- 5 January – Two members of the IRA, Francis Donnelly (24) and Lawrence Montgomery (24), were killed in Northwick Drive, Ardoyne, when the car bomb they were transporting exploded prematurely.

== 1980 ==
- 16 August: A civilian was accidentally shot dead by the IRA during a gun attack on an RUC patrol in Ardoyne.

== 1981 ==
- 27 March: The UDA shot dead a Catholic civilian on Berwick Road.

== 1987 ==
- 10 March: An RUC officer was killed when the IRA detonated a remote controlled bomb at the Ardoyne Shops on Crumlin Road. The RUC had been lured to the area by a hoax phone call claiming an armed robbery was in progress. The IRA had correctly anticipated which doorway the RUC would take cover in and detonated a small booby-trap bomb when they arrived. The IRA claimed his death was retaliation for "RUC brutality at republican funerals".
- 2 April: The UVF shot dead an IRA volunteer at his home in Ardoyne.
- 12 July: A former member of the Royal Air Force was shot dead by the IRA on Alliance Avenue. The IRA said it had intervened "to end an hour-long attack by loyalists on the area". Locals claimed the man had been attempting to stop youths from throwing stones and bottles into the nearby Catholic area. A 16-year-old was also wounded in the shooting.

== 1989 ==
- 19 March: The UVF shot dead a Catholic civilian at his home on Alliance Avenue.

== 1992 ==
- 21 February: The Ulster Freedom Fighters (UFF) claimed responsibility for a gun and grenade attack on the home of a Sinn Féin councillor in Ardoyne.
- 12 March: The UFF claimed responsibility for shooting dead a Catholic civilian at his home on Alliance Avenue.

== 1993 ==
- 31 August: In an attack in Ardoyne, two British soldiers were wounded when the IRA detonated a car-bomb near their patrol.
- 21 September 1993: A British soldier was wounded when an IRA unit threw a blast-bomb at his patrol in the Ardoyne area.

== 1997 ==
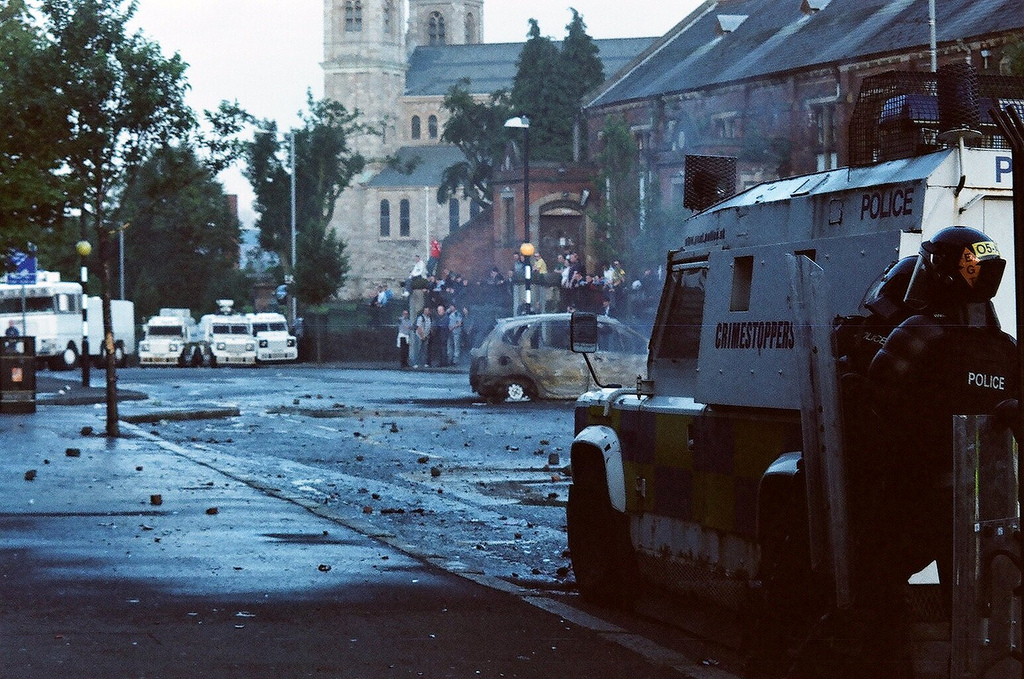
Riot police and burnt out car in Ardoyne, 2011

- 13 March: A British soldier was injured by an IRA grenade in Ardoyne. Several people were arrested in the aftermath.
- 8 July: There was a gun battle between loyalist and IRA volunteers in Ardoyne. The IRA state that two loyalists were wounded.
