= You Gotta Sin to Get Saved =

Studio album by Maria McKee
- Released: June 8, 1993
- Genres: Country rock; roots rock
- Length: 40:46
- Label: Geffen
- Producer: George Drakoulias

Maria McKee chronology
Maria McKee (1989)	You Gotta Sin to Get Saved (1993)	Life Is Sweet (1996)

You Gotta Sin to Get Saved is the second album by the American singer-songwriter Maria McKee, released in 1993. The album includes two Van Morrison covers and a take on Goffin/King's "I Can't Make It Alone". The first single was "I'm Gonna Soothe You", which peaked at No. 35 on the UK Singles Chart.

McKee, while promoting her third album, stated that she was unsatisfied with You Gotta Sin to Get Saved.

== Critical reception ==
Professional ratings
Review scores
Source	Rating
AllMusic	4.5/5 stars
Calgary Herald	C
NME	8/10

Trouser Press wrote: "Like much of this amazing, unexpected album, McKee splits her convictions between the music and the words, sinning and saving herself in a fission explosion that blasts into the spirit of rock'n'roll." The Guardian concluded that "languid backing by California session pros Jim Keltner, Benmont Tench et al, does nothing to spice up Maria's clear voice, or tumbleweed 'n' dust affairs." Johnny Dee of NME described the album as "good, occasionally inspired, stuff" on which McKee "adopts a heavily rootsical approach, mixing R&B, country and Southern soul into a melancholic rock pot". He said it contained "all handsome songs", but felt it was McKee's "stunning delivery that really charms", writing, "McKee's voice torches each song with deep melancholic melody and her band mirror this beautifully, tinting everything with a richly soulful brush." He concluded, "An unreservedly retro and indulgent album, but a valuable one nonetheless. If there's a space in your record collection between the Black Crowes and the Jayhawks, [this] will plug that gap amply."

Ian Gittins of Melody Maker described the album as "no disgrace", but felt that it "still falls inevitably short of the sacred heights she scales live". He considered George Drakoulias' production to be "partly the problem", with the tracks "riddled with parping brass and cheesy keyboards", and added that the music is "frequently lame" and "spirited belters are few". He concluded, "The LP's "forte [being] shoulder-heaving, wrenched ballads, sepia laments, yet McKee never sounds truly wracked or at her best. The live shows may see McKee soar again, but here is a girl nowhere near her volcano."

== Track listing ==
1. "I'm Gonna Soothe You" (Bruce Brody, Marvin Etzioni, McKee) – 3:36
2. "My Lonely Sad Eyes" (Van Morrison) – 2:41
3. "My Girlhood Among the Outlaws" (McKee) – 3:44
4. "Only Once" (McKee) – 4:03
5. "I Forgive You" (Sam Brown, McKee) – 5:06
6. "I Can't Make It Alone" (Gerry Goffin, Carole King) – 3:38
7. "Precious Time" (Gary Louris, Mark Olson) – 3:35
8. "The Way Young Lovers Do" (Van Morrison) – 3:29
9. "Why Wasn't I More Grateful (When Life Was Sweet)" (Brody, Etzioni, McKee) – 5:05
10. "You Gotta Sin to Get Saved" (Brody, Sam Dogg, Etzioni, McKee) – 5:49

== Personnel ==
- Maria McKee – piano, rhythm guitar, vocals
- Jon Auer – background vocals
- Bruce Brody – organ, piano, Hammond organ, background vocals, handclapping, Wurlitzer
- David Campbell – conductor
- George Drakoulias – drums
- Marvin Etzioni – bass guitar, guitar, mandolin, background vocals, handclapping
- Don Heffington – percussion, drums, background vocals, handclapping
- The Jayhawks
- Jim Keltner – drums
- Dale Lavi – handclapping
- Gary Louris – electric guitar, background vocals, handclapping
- The Memphis Horns – horns
- Spyder Mittleman – saxophone
- Brendan O'Brien – bass
- Mark Olson – acoustic guitar, guitar, harmonica, background vocals, handclapping
- Nicol Sponberg – handclapping
- Ken Stringfellow – background vocals
- Benmont Tench – organ, piano, Hammond organ, background vocals, handclapping, Wurlitzer, vox organ
- Mike Utley – piano
- Don Was – bass
- Julia Waters – background vocals
- Maxine Waters – background vocals
- Edna Wright – background vocals

Production

- Producer: George Drakoulias
- Engineers: Brendan O'Brien, Thom Panunzio, Martin Schmelze
- Assistant engineers: Doug Boehm, Jim Champagne
- Mixing: David Bianco, Martin Schmelze
- Mastering: Stephen Marcussen
- Arranger: David Campbell
- Horn arrangements: The Memphis Horns
- Art direction: Janet Wolshom
- Director: Robin Sloane
- Photography: Marvin Etzioni

== Charts ==
Chart (1993)	Peak position
Australian Albums (ARIA)	135
US Heatseekers Albums (Billboard)	12
Swedish Albums (Sverigetopplistan)	12
Norwegian Albums (VG-lista)	11
UK Albums (Official Charts)	26
European Albums (Eurotipsheet)	69
