= Life Is Sweet (album) =

Studio album by Maria McKee
- Released: March 26, 1996
- Genre: Alternative rock
- Length: 50:34
- Label: Geffen
- Producers: Bruce Brody, Mark Freegard, Maria McKee

Maria McKee chronology
You Gotta Sin to Get Saved (1993)	Life Is Sweet (1996)	High Dive (2003)

Life Is Sweet is the third album by American singer-songwriter Maria McKee, released in 1996.

== Critical reception ==
Professional ratings
Review scores
Source	Rating
AllMusic	3/5 stars

Billboard praised the first single, "Absolutely Barking Stars", stating "get ready for the new and improved McKee. The over-the-top howl of past recordings has been replaced by a more restrained, warmly shaded vocal style that explores a surprisingly strong lower range. The raw emotion is still there, but it's unleashed in spurts and displayed as much in the instrumentation as it is in her singing. This first single from Life Is Sweet is a spare rock ballad that combines urgent guitars with Phil Spector-styled strings. Uniquely beautiful and challenging."

Cashbox noted that "McKee has long had one of the most unique and evocative voices in music. The former singer for Lone Justice has made significant changes on her new disc, Life Is Sweet, an edgier, more dramatic collection of material than her previous down-home roots have indicated....On "Absolutely Barking Stars," the first single, she’s joined by strings and a shimmering, al-most orchestral arrangement that crisscrosses with jangly percussive syncopation while McKee’s voice soars and vibrates in between, culminating in a high-drama crescendo."

AllMusic editor Stephen Thomas Erlewine called the album "a bold departure from her trademark sound, taking her into new sonic territories. Although the loud, distorted guitars are the first noticeable change, it soon becomes apparent that the thing that makes the album sound so different is its latent progressive rock influences. Throughout the album, McKee weaves complex, layered arrangements that interweave strings, guitars, and keyboards....with its art rock tendencies and naked ambition, Life Is Sweet may not appeal to fans who have become attached to McKee's country-rock. For those willing to accept her pretensions, it is a frustrating but rewarding album."

Trouser Press wrote that the album "goes straight over the top in a bewildering styleless hodgepodge of bad production ideas, bizarre gimmicks (paraphrasing melodies and rhythm guitar sounds from Ziggy Stardust?), uneven writing and singing so mindlessly zealous in spots that McKee can’t possibly be hearing herself." The Washington Post thought that "McKee's songs are sometimes swamped by the ornate arrangements, but her wide-ranging vocals are consistently expressive."

== Track listing ==
All songs by Maria McKee, except where noted

1. "Scarlover" – 5:16
2. "This Perfect Dress" – 4:26
3. "Absolutely Barking Stars" – 4:23
4. "I'm Not Listening" (Bruce Brody, McKee, David Nolte) – 4:02
5. "Everybody" – 4:17
6. "Smarter" – 3:13
7. "What Else You Wanna Know" – 5:23
8. "I'm Awake" – 3:51
9. "Human" – 4:17
10. "Carried" (McKee, Nolte) – 4:42
11. "Life Is Sweet" – 4:06
12. "Afterlife" (Brody, McKee) – 2:38

== Personnel ==
- Maria McKee – guitar, vocals, producer, mixing, arranging
- Bruce Brody – piano, conductor, Hammond organ, Moog synthesizer, producer, mixing, arranging
- Ric Kavin – percussion, drums
- David Nolte – bass guitar, guitar
- Susan Otten – percussion, vocals
- Martin Tillman – orchestra
- Mark Freegard – producer, audio engineer, mixing
- Bob Salcedo – assistant engineer
- John Aguto – mixing assistant
- Mike Baumgartner – mixing assistant
- Bob Ludwig – mastering
- Janet Wolsborn – art direction
- David Mayenfisch – photography

== Charts ==
Chart (1996)	Peak position
US Heatseekers Albums (Billboard)	17
Swedish Albums (Sverigetopplistan)	8
Norwegian Albums (VG-lista)	22
UK Albums (Official Charts)	81
Scottish Albums (Official Charts)	69
