= Peddlin' Dreams =

Studio album by Maria McKee
- Released: April 19, 2005
- Genre: Rock
- Length: 45:15
- Label: Eleven Thirty
- Producer: Jim Akin

Maria McKee chronology
Live in Hamburg (2004)	Peddlin' Dreams (2005)	Late December (2007)

Professional ratings
Review scores
Source	Rating
Allmusic	4/5 stars

Peddlin' Dreams is the sixth album by American singer-songwriter Maria McKee, released in 2005 (see 2005 in music).

== Track listing ==
All tracks composed by Maria McKee, except where indicated.

No.	Title	Writer(s)	Length
1.	"Season of the Fair"		3:34
2.	"Sullen Soul"	Jim Akin	4:26
3.	"Turn Away"	McKee, Bruce Brody	3:23
4.	"Peddlin' Dreams"		4:31
5.	"My One True Love"	Jim Akin	3:37
6.	"People in the Way"		4:14
7.	"The Horse Life"		3:07
8.	"Drowned and Died"	McKee, Jim Akin	4:14
9.	"Appalachian Boy"		5:04
10.	"Everyone's Got a Story"		3:04
11.	"Barstool Blues"	Neil Young	3:05
12.	"(You Don't Know) How Glad I Am"	Jimmy Williams, Larry Harrison	2:56

== Personnel ==
- Maria McKee – acoustic and electric guitar, piano, vocals
- Jim Akin – electric guitar, bass, double bass, keyboards, steel guitar, backing vocals
- Jerry Andrews – acoustic and electric guitar, backing vocals
- Tom Dunne – percussion

== Charts ==
Chart (2005)	Peak position
Swedish Albums (Sverigetopplistan)	24
