= The Fitz =

The Fitz is a British sitcom written by stand-up comedian Owen O'Neill that was first broadcast on BBC Two between 4 August and 8 September 2000. It concerns an "unhinged Irish family" who live on the border between Northern Ireland and the Republic of Ireland. All of the children are named after the American Kennedy family. The series fared poorly critically, with some attacking its stereotyping and dated humour. The show ran for only one series, and has never been repeated.
