= Stuart A. Staples =

English musician

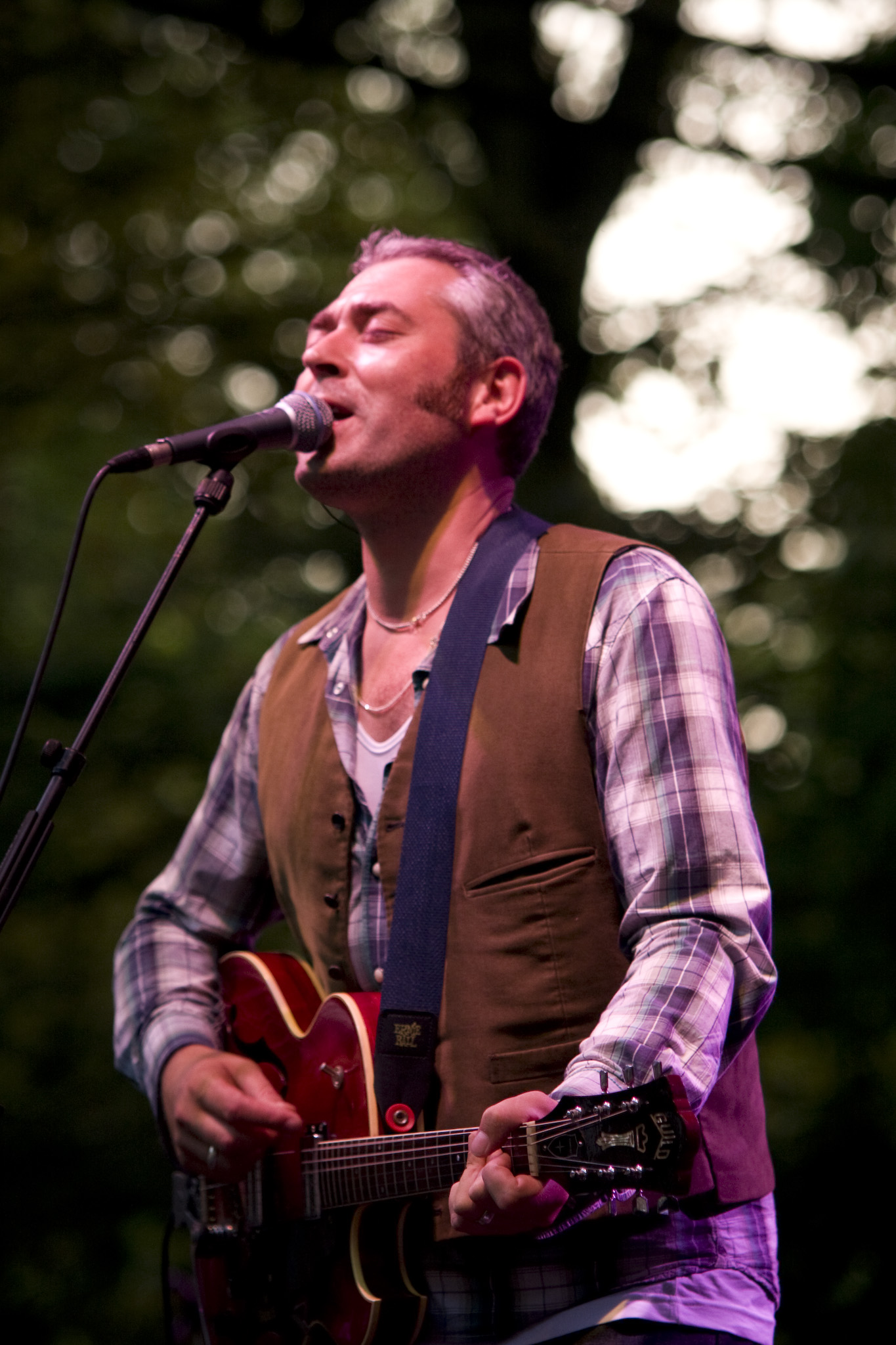
- Staples in 2009

Background information
- Born: Stuart Ashton Staples; 14 November 1965 (age 60); Basford, Nottinghamshire, England
- Genres: Indie rock
- Instruments: Vocals, guitar
- Spouse: Suzanne Osborne

Stuart Ashton Staples (born 14 November 1965) is an English musician best known as the lead singer of indie band Tindersticks, in which he also plays guitar. Staples is noted for his crooning vocal style and a bass, nasal voice.

== Biography ==
Prior to co-founding Tindersticks, Staples played in a band called Indignant Desert Birds (1983-1987) and thereafter in a band called Asphalt Ribbons, whose final line-up was nearly identical to that of his later band. He has released two solo albums: Lucky Dog Recordings 03-04 and Leaving Songs.

Staples is also active as a film composer. He has provided the soundtrack to many of Claire Denis's films, including L'Intrus (2004), White Material (2009), and High Life (2018). Tindersticks had previously recorded the music to two other Denis films, Nénette et Boni and Trouble Every Day. In 2007 Staples collaborated with David Boulter on the soundtrack to Tot Ziens! (We'll meet Again), a short by Belgian director Klaus Verscheure, and he also provided the music for the 2019 film Vers la bataille, the fourth film by Aurélien Vernhes-Lermusiaux.

In 2017, the British Film Institute released Minute Bodies, a film he directed and scored with Christine Ott and Thomas Belhom of films by the naturalist F. Percy Smith.

== Solo discography ==
=== Albums ===
- Lucky Dog Recordings 03-04 (2005), Beggars Banquet
- Leaving Songs (2006), Beggars Banquet
- Songs for the Young at Heart (2007, with Dave Boulter)
- Arrhythmia (2018)
- Music For Claire Denis' 'High Life' (2019)
- Un Beau Soleil Interieur (Original Soundtrack) (2023)
