= Maria McKee =

American singer-songwriter (born 1964)

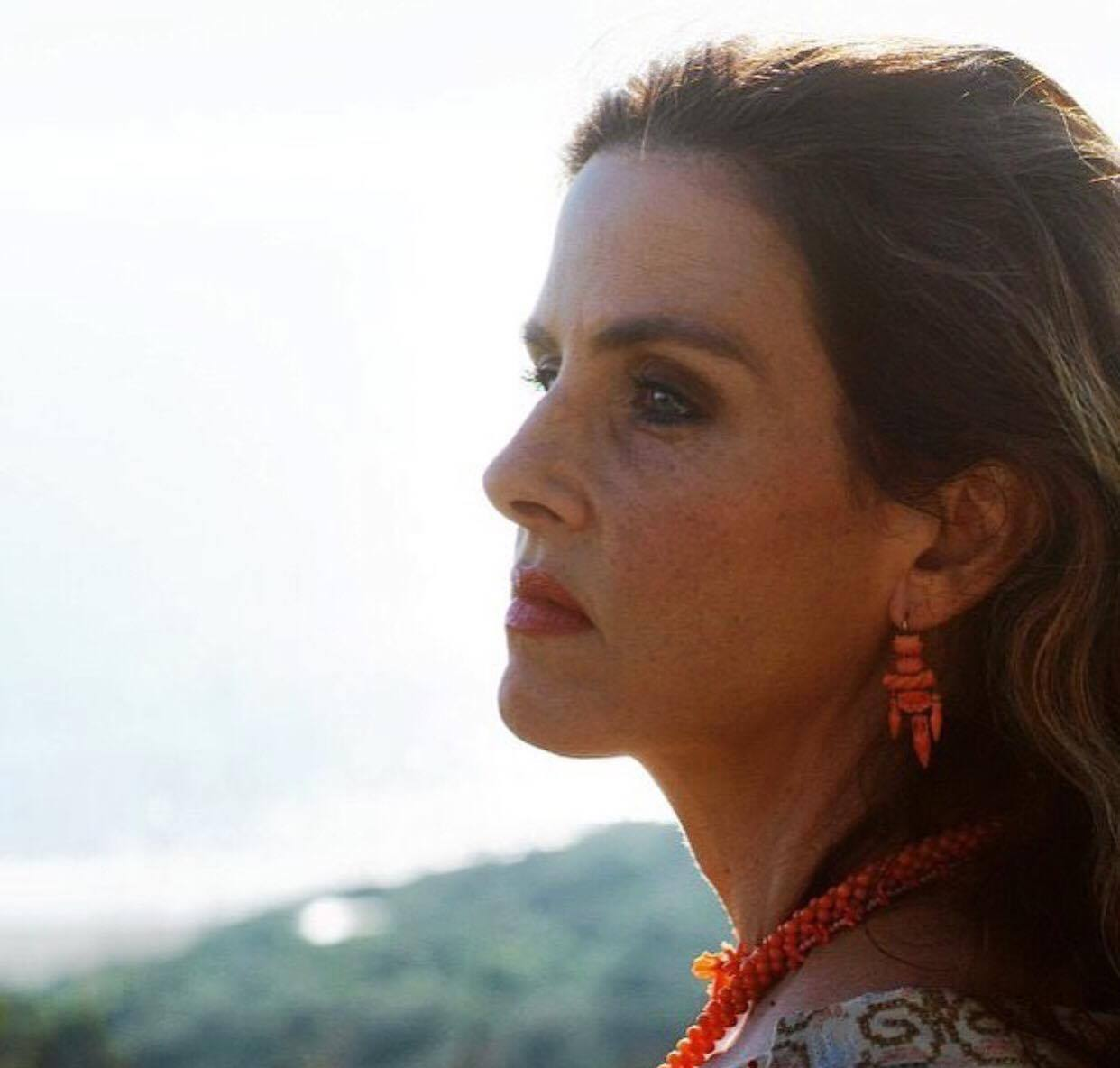
- McKee, 2017

Background information
- Born: Maria Luisa McKee; August 17, 1964 (age 62)
- Origin: Los Angeles, California, U.S.
- Genres: Pop rock; alternative rock; alternative country; rockabilly (early)
- Years active: 1982–present
- Labels: Geffen; Viewfinder/Little Diva; Eleven Thirty; Cooking Vinyl

Maria Luisa McKee (born August 17, 1964) is an American singer-songwriter. She is best known for her work with Lone Justice, her 1990 song "Show Me Heaven", and her song "If Love Is a Red Dress (Hang Me in Rags)" from the soundtrack of the film Pulp Fiction.

== Early life ==
Maria McKee was born in Los Angeles in 1964. She grew up in a bohemian family and is the half-sister of Bryan MacLean (1946–1998), the guitarist of the band Love.

== Music ==
McKee was a founding member of the cowpunk and proto-Americana band Lone Justice in 1982, with whom she released two albums. In 1983, she sang the song "Never Be You" for the soundtrack of the movie "Streets of Fire" (1984). Several compilations, of both previously released and unreleased material, and a BBC Live in Concert album, have been released since the group disbanded in 1987. Bob Dylan wrote the song "Go Away Little Boy" for the band's debut album, Lone Justice, which later appeared as a B-side. The band opened for such acts as U2 and Tom Petty. During this period of her career, she was managed by Jimmy Iovine.

When she was 19, McKee wrote Feargal Sharkey's 1985 song "A Good Heart", which she has since recorded and released herself on her album Late December. Sharkey also covered "To Miss Someone", from her self-titled solo debut, on his third solo album, Songs from the Mardi Gras. In 1987, she appeared in the Robbie Robertson music video "Somewhere Down the Crazy River" (directed by Martin Scorsese), and contributed back-up vocals to his debut solo album, which included the song. McKee released her first solo, self-titled album in 1989, on which Richard Thompson played guitar and Steve Wickham (from The Waterboys) played fiddle. It received critical acclaim in Europe, prompting McKee to move to Ireland.

Her song "Show Me Heaven", which appeared on the soundtrack to the film Days of Thunder, topped the charts in Belgium, the Netherlands, Norway, and the United Kingdom, where the song topped the UK Singles Chart for four weeks, becoming Britain's sixth biggest-selling song of 1990. Additionally, "Show Me Heaven" became McKee's second number one – and first self-performed – song on the UK Singles Chart after Sharkey's "A Good Heart" topped the chart in November 1985. She rarely performed this song in public until recently, before she sang it at Dublin Pride.

Her song "If Love Is a Red Dress (Hang Me in Rags)" was personally selected by Quentin Tarantino for his feature film Pulp Fiction. It is the only original song on the soundtrack.

In 1992, she released the song "Sweetest Child", which was produced by Youth and featured Robert "Throb" Young from the band Primal Scream.

Following her debut, McKee released five studio records and two live albums. The album Life Is Sweet featured her lead guitar work described as "feral" by the British Mojo magazine, which listed it as a runner-up to album of the year in their critics’ poll. The raw, postmodern album (produced by Mark Freegard) was a marked shift from her previous roots rock style. Her later three records, High Dive (2003), Peddlin' Dreams (2005) and Late December (2007), were released independently via her own label, Viewfinder Records (distributed in the UK via Cooking Vinyl).

In 1995, Bette Midler recorded two of McKee's songs—"To Deserve You" and "The Last Time"—for her platinum album, Bette of Roses. In 1998, country trio The Chicks recorded McKee's "Am I the Only One (Who's Ever Felt This Way?)", featuring several notable solos by fiddler Martie Maguire. The band included the track on their Grammy-nominated debut album Wide Open Spaces. In 2003, during their Top of the World Tour, The Chicks invited opening act Joan Osborne back to the stage to perform the song with them on several occasions.

McKee appears on the 2014 compilation Songs from a Stolen Spring that paired Western musicians with artists from the Arab Spring. On the album, her performance of the Tony Joe White song "Ol' Mother Earth" was meshed with "I Still Exist" by the Egyptian band Massar Egbari.

She recorded a medley of "Ride a White Swan" and "She Was Born to Be My Unicorn" for the Marc Bolan tribute album Angel Headed Hipster, produced by Hal Willner. The album also includes tracks by Gavin Friday, Father John Misty and Nick Cave.

== Session and guest work ==
In addition to writing Sharkey's song, "A Good Heart", McKee has contributed to the Victoria Williams' tribute album Sweet Relief, on the song "Opelousas (Sweet Relief)". She has also provided backing vocals to U2's cover of Creedence Clearwater Revival's "Fortunate Son" (B-side of 1992 "Who's Gonna Ride Your Wild Horses" single from their Achtung Baby album), as well as to Counting Crows' 1993 debut August and Everything After on "Sullivan Street" and "Mr. Jones". On Robin Zander's 1993 solo album she sang backing vocals for the track "Reactionary Girl". She also sang backing vocals on Robbie Robertson's debut and self-titled solo album, on the track "American Roulette". Much lesser known is her contribution of lead and co-lead vocals on two tracks on a contemporary Christian praise and worship album called Come As You Are.

She also contributed a song, "Never Be You," for the soundtrack to the Walter Hill movie Streets of Fire. She recorded a duet, "Friends in Time", with The Golden Horde on their eponymously titled album in 1991. She also recorded the duet "This Road is Long" with Stuart A. Staples of the band Tindersticks on his 2006 album Leaving Songs. In addition she co-wrote a duet titled "Promise You Anything" with Steve Earle, which appeared on his 1990 album The Hard Way. She teamed up with Dwight Yoakam for a duet on "Bury Me," from his 1986 debut, Guitars, Cadillacs, Etc., Etc. She contributed the lyrics and vocals to the song "No Big Bang" on the only album by The Heads, No Talking, Just Head, also playing guitar and synthesizer on the song together with the band, mostly ex-members of Talking Heads.

In 2016, she performed the Blind Willie Johnson song "Let Your Light Shine On Me" on the tribute album God Don't Never Change: The Songs of Blind Willie Johnson.

== Film work ==
In 2013, McKee and her husband, Jim Akin, self-released their first independent feature film, After the Triumph of Your Birth, through their production company, Shootist Films. The film was written, directed, shot, recorded, and edited by Akin and features McKee (who co-produced) in her acting debut as an ensemble cast member. They scored the film together and the soundtrack was released in 2012.

Shootist Films' second feature film The Ocean of Helena Lee (featuring her in a supporting role) was released May 2015 with accompanying soundtrack. The film played a week run at The American Cinematheque at The Egyptian Theater. Akin, McKee and drummer Tom Dunne (also an actor and lead player in the film) performed a set of music after each screening. The film screened in competition at The Indie Memphis Film Festival and The Pesaro International Film Festival as well as out of competition in The Fastnet Film Festival in Schull, Ireland.

== Published fiction ==
In 2009, McKee's short story, "Charcoal", was included in the Melville House Publishing short fiction anthology Amplified: Fiction from Leading Alt-Country, Indie Rock, Blues and Folk Musicians. In 2018, an audio version of "Charcoal" was recorded by voice actor Patrice Gambardella and published on Bibliophone, a free audio book platform.

== Personal life ==
McKee is married to musician and filmmaker Jim Akin. She came out in 2018 as pansexual, and referred to herself as a "dyke". She is also an advocate for queer and transgender rights.

She and Akin have had a range of breeds as pets over the years, including a pug, greyhound, and whippet. She also has volunteered with a greyhound adoption group. Her song "My First Night without You" was written after one of her pugs died.

As of 2020, she lived in London, where she recorded La Vita Nuova. She currently lives in Los Angeles.

== Discography ==
- Maria McKee (1989)
- You Gotta Sin to Get Saved (1993)
- Life Is Sweet (1996)
- High Dive (2003)
- Peddlin' Dreams (2005)
- Late December (2007)
- La Vita Nuova (2020)
