= List of Lebanese films =

With more than 500 films made in Lebanon, this is an incomplete list of Lebanese films in year order. For an A-Z list of films currently on Wikipedia, see Category:Lebanese films. ...

== 1920s ==
Year	Title	Other Titles	Director	Cast	Writer	Genre	Release	Production	Length
1929	The Adventures of Elias Mabrouk	Arabic: "مغامرات إلياس مبروك"; French: Les Aventures d'Elias Mubarak	Jordano Pidutti			Comedy	1929		

== 1930s ==
Year	Title	Other Titles	Director	Cast	Writer	Genre	Release	Production	Length
1931	The Adventures of Abu Abed	Arabic: "مغامرات ابو عبد"; French: Les Aventures d'Abu Abed	Jordano Pidutti	Rachid Ali Chaaban		Comedy	1931	Rachid Ali Chaaban	
1936	In the Ruins of Baalbeck	Arabic: "بين هياكل بعلبك"; French: Dans les ruines de Baalbek	Karim Bustany; Julio de Lucci	Meblo Csinobolo; Edward Farah; Mustafa Kolaylat		Drama	1936	Luminar Films	

== 1940s ==
Year	Title	Other Titles	Director	Cast	Writer	Genre	Release	Production	Length
1943	The Rose Seller	Arabic: بياعة الورد; French:La Vendeuse de rose	Ali Al-Ariss		Ali Al-Ariss	Romantic; Drama	1943		
1946	Planet of the Desert Princess	Arabic: كوكب أميرة الصحرا; French: Planète de la princesse du désert	Ali Al-Ariss	Antoine Haddad; Melvina Amine; Nadia Chamoun	Ali Al-Ariss	Romantic; Drama	1946		1h 20m
1946	Summer in Lebanon	Arabic: صيف في لبنان; French: L'été au Liban	Salah Badrakan						
1947	A Lebanese at University	Arabic: لبناني في الجامعة; French: Un Libanais à l'université	Hussein Faouzi	Sabah	Hassan Toufic; Wafiq Al-Alayli	Drama; Comedy	1946	Nahhas Films	1h 20m
1947	The Summer Season in Lebanon	Arabic: الإصطياف في لبنان	Bishara Wakim	Nour Al Hoda		Romantic; Drama	1947		

== 1950s ==
Year	Title	Other Titles	Director	Cast	Writer	Genre	Release	Production	Length
1951	Bride of Lebanon	Arabic: عروس لبنان; French: La Mariée du liban	Hussein Fawzi	Hagar Hamdi	Hassan Toufic; Hussein Faouzi	Comedy	1951	Noura Productions	1hr 34m
1952	An Egyptian in Lebanon	Arabic: مصري في لبنان; French: Un Egyptien au Liban	Gianni Vernuccio	Nour Al Hoda; Kamal El-Shinnawi; Mahmood Farid	Saleh Goudat	Romantic; Comedy	1952		1h 40m
1953	Remorse	Arabic: عذاب الضمير; French: Remords	Georges Qa'i	Ihsan Sadek; Michel Tamer; Lucien Harb	Georges Qa'i; Nazmi Adnan	Drama	1953	Al-Arz Al-Fania	1h 25m
1957	The First Melody	Arabic: اللحن الأول; French: Le premier chant	Mohamed Selmane	Najah Salam; Wadih El Safi		Musical	1958	Mohamad Ali Al-Sabah	
1957	Red Flowers	Arabic: زهور حمراء; French: Fleurs Rouges	Michel Haroun	Georges Dfouni; Aline Freiha	Michel Haroun	Drama	1957		1h 44m
1958	Towards the Unknown	Arabic: إلى أين; French: Vers l'inconnu	Georges Nasser	Laura Azar; Shakib Khouri; Mounir Nader; Raouf Rawi; Nazha Younes	Youssef Habchi Achkar; Halim Fares; Georges Nasser	Drama	1958	Lebanon Pictures	1h 30m
1958	For Whom the Sun Rises	Arabic: لمن تشرق الشمس; French: Pour qui se lève le soleil	Joseph Fahdi	Nour Al Hoda; Gilda El-Almaniya	Chakib Khoury	Drama	1958	Mediterranean Films	1h 30m
1958	Memories	Arabic: ذكريات; French: Souvenirs	Georges Qa'i	Lucien Harb; Qamar; Tony Nehmeh	Georges Qa'i	Drama	1958		
1958	Rendezvous with Hope	Arabic: موعد مع الأمل; French: Rendez-vous ave l'espoir	Mohamed Selmane	Qamar; Taghrid	Mohamed Selmane	Drama	1958	Samar Films	1h 21m
1959	The Songs of My Love	Arabic: أنغام حبيبي; French: Les Chants de mon amour	Mohamed Selmane	Najah Salam; Wadih El Safi		Musical	1960		
1959	The Judgement of Fate	Arabic: حكم القدر; French: Jugement du destin	Joseph Ghorayeb	Nadia Gamal; Habiba; Joseph Nano; Sylvana Barakat		Drama	1959		1h 40m
1959	Days of My Life	Arabic: أيّام من عمري; French: Jours de ma vie	Georges Qa'i	Ihsan Sadek	Georges Ibrahim El-Khoury	Drama	1959		1h 35m
1959	Two Hearts, One Body	Arabic: قلبان وجسد; French: Deux cœurs, un corps	Georges Qa'i	Qamar; Michel Tamer; Ihsan Sadek	Georges Qa'i; Mohamed Selmane	Drama	1959		1h 30m
1959	The Rock of Love	Arabic: صخر الحب; French: Le rocher de l'amour	Rida Myassar	Sammira Ahmad; Emad Hamdy	Abdel Ghany Qamar	Drama	1959		1hr 21m

== 1960s ==
The 1960s witnessed a cinema boom in Lebanon, marked by numerous co-productions with Egypt, Syria and Iraq, alongside the establishment of new studios in Beirut, such as Baalbeck Studios and Studio Chammas.

Year	Title	Other Titles	Director	Cast	Writer	Genre	Release	Production	Length
1960	The Baalbeck Festival, 1960	French: Le festival de Baalbeck 1960	David McDonald		Soraya Antonios	Short	1961		
1960	Birth of the Prophet	Arabic: "مولد الرسول"; French: Naissance du prophète	Ahmed El Touki	Samira Tewfik; Youssef Wahbi		Drama	1960	Atlas Films	
1960	Burning Heart	Arabic: في قلبها نار; French: Cœur brûlant	Ahmed El Touki	Nazha Younes; Najah Salam	Ahmed El Touki	Drama	1960		
1960	The Deadly Necklace	Arabic: العقد القاتل; French: Le collier meutrier Other: The Deadly Collar	Ibrahim Takkush	Antoinette Nahhas; Julia Daou	Ibrahim Takkush	Drama	1960	Takkouche & Falah	1h 30m
1960	I Am Not Guilty	Arabic: لست مذنبة; French:Je ne suis pas coupable	Ibrahim Takkush	Issam Al-Shanawy; Nawal Farid	Zakaria Shami	Drama	1960	Beirut Film	
1960	The Small Stranger	Arabic: الغريب الصغير; French: Le petit étranger	Georges Nasser	Gaston Chikhani; Shakib Khouri; Suzette Stellwy		Drama	1962		
1960	A Stranger in the House	Arabic: "في الدار غريبة"; French: Une étrangère à la maison	Joseph Fahdi	Nawal Fahd	Ibrahim Takkush	Drama	1960		
1961	The Knight and the Wretched	Arabic: الفارس والشقي	Georges Qa'i	Essam Al Shennawy; Nassir Cortbawi; Qamar	Georges Qa'i	Drama	1961		1h 30m
1961	The Temple of Love	Arabic: معبد الحب	Atef Salem	Sabah	Nairouz Abdel Malak; Atef Salem	Romantic; Drama	1961	Tannous Frangieh	1h 40m
1961	The White Poison	Arabic: السم الأبيض; French:Le poison blanc	Georges Qa'i	Nazha Younes; Ihsan Sadek		Drama	1961		
1962	Abu Salim in the City	Arabic: أبو سليم في المدينة; French: Abu Salim en ville	Hasib Chams	Salah Tizani		Comedy	1962		
1962	The Broken Wings	Arabic: الأجنحة المتكسرة; French: Les ailes brisées	Youssef Maalouf	Nidal Al-Ashkar; Philippe Akiki; Pierre Borday	Said Akl; Kahlil Gibran	Drama	1964		1h 30m
1962	The Devil's Chariot	Arabic: عربة الشيطان; French: La charrette du diable	Georges Qa'i	Nazha Younes; Ihsan Sadek	Georges Qa'i	Drama	1962		1h 30m
1962	Hello, Love!	Arabic: أهلاً بالحب; French: Bonjour, mon amour	Mohamed Selmane	Najah Salam; Samia Gamal; Jacqueline; Salah Tizani	Wafiq Al-Alayli; Muhammad Abu Youssef	Drama	1962		1h 45m
1962	Years	Arabic: سنين; French: Des années	Georges Qa'i		Georges Qa'i	Drama	1962		
1963	Abu Salim, the Messenger of Romance	Arabic: أبو سليم، رسول الغرام	Youssef Maalouf	Salah Tizani		Comedy	1963		
1963	A Bedouin Girl in Love	Arabic: البدوية العاشقة	Niazi Mostafa	Samira Tewfik; Melvina Amine	Badr Nofal; Bahgat Amar	Romantic; Musical	1963	Asriah Films	1h 35m
1963	Chouchou and the Million	Arabic: شوشو والمليون; French: Chouchou et le million	Antoine Remy	Chouchou; Elias Rizk; René Helou	Mohamed Shamel	Comedy	1963		1h 30m
1963	A Love Story	Arabic: حكاية غرام; French: Histoire d'amour	Mohamed Salman	Maha Sabry; Moharam Fouad; Wahid Jalal; Julia Daou; Hassan El Mliegy	Mohamed Salman; Said Elmaghrabi	Drama	1963	Fawaz Bros.	1h 35m
1963	Lebanon at Night	Arabic: لبنان في الليل; French: Le Liban, la nuit	Mohamed Salman	Sabah; Jacqueline; Samira Tewfik; Jean Saadeh	Mohamed Salman	Drama	1963		1h 30m
1963	Master Craftsman Lattouf	Arabic: المعلّم لطّوف	Kamel Costandi; Nizar Mikati	Nazha Younes; Najib Hankach			1963		
1963	Red on the Snow	Arabic: دماء على الثلج; French: Rouge sur neige	Wiam El-Saidi			Drama	1963		
1963	Strike of the Promise'	Arabic: ضربة الوعد; French:							
1963	The Vigilant Eye	Arabic: العين الساهرة; French: L'oeil vigilant	Gary Garabedian	Elias Rizk; Leïla Karam; Leïla Salibi		Drama	1963	Baalbeck Studios	
1963	The Wonders of Love	Arabic: يا سلام عالحب	Mohamed Salman	Abdel Salam Al Nabulsy	Mohamed Salman; Mahmoud Naseer	Musical	1963	Sharqia Films	1hr 56m
1964	Antar's Daughter	Arabic: بنت عنتر	Niazi Mostafa	Samira Tewfik	Fouad Al Qassas; Abdul Ghani Sheikh	Drama	1964		1h 40m
1964	A Bedouin in Paris	Arabic: بدوية في باريس	Mohamed Salman	Samira Tewfik; Rushdy Abaza	Mohamed Salman	Romantic; Musical	1964	Sabah Bros.	1hr 35m
1964	Beloved of All	Arabic: حبيبة الكل	Rida Meyassar	Sabah; Fahd Ballan	Reda Myassar; Abdul Ghani Sheikh; Omar Assal	Comedy	1964	Sabah Bros.	1h 36m
1964	The Desert Beauty	Arabic: حسناء البادية; French: La Beauté du désert	Seif Eddine Shawkat	Samira Tewfik; Samira Barudi; Nadia Gamal	Saifuddin Shawkat; Gamil El Aas	Romantic; Drama	1964	Fawaz Bros.	1h 45m
1964	Idol of the Crowds	Arabic: فاتنة الجماهير; French: L'Idole des foules	Mohamed Salman	Sabah	Mohamed Salman; Said Elmaghrabi	Drama	1964	Sabah Bros.	1h 47m
1964	Joys of Youth	Arabic: أفراح الشباب; French: Les Joies de la jeunesse	Mohamed Salman	Sabah; Jacqueline	Said Elmaghrabi; Mohamed Salman	Musical	1964	Anwar Sheikh Yassine; Elias Haddad	1hr 47m
1964	The Mountain Singer	Arabic: شادية الجبل; French: La Chanteuse de montagne	Ahmed Diaeddine	Farid Shawqi; Berlenti Abdul Hamid	Ahmed Diaeddine	Drama	1964	Fawaz Bros. Lebanon	1h 50m
1964	O' Night	Arabic: يا ليل	Gary Garabedian				1964		
1964	Pearl Necklace	Arabic: عقد اللولو; French: Le collier de perles	Youssef Maalouf	Sabah; Duraid Lahham	Nehad Qalei; Duraid Lahham	Romantic; Comedy	1964		1hr 40m
1964	You Are My Life	Arabic: أنت عمري	Georges Qa'i	Abdel Salam Al Nabulsy; Jacqueline	Mohamed Salman; Michel Tuama	Comedy	1964	Anwar Sheikh Yassine	1h 35m
1965	Abu Salim in Africa	Arabic: ابو سليم في افريقيا; French: Abu Salim en Afrique	Gary Garabedian	Salah Tizani	Gary Garabedian	Comedy	1965	Tizani Films	1h 20m
1965	Auliban, the Seller of Rings	Arabic: بياع الخواتم; French: Le vendeur de bagues U.S.: Auliban, the Seller of Jokes	Youssef Chahine	Fairuz; Philemon Wehbe; Nasri Shamseddine; Joseph Azar; Joseph Nassif	Rahbani Brothers	Musical	1965	Phenicia Films	1h 35min
1965	Bitter Honey	Arabic: العسل و المر; French: Le Miel amer	Rida Meyassar	Randa; Jacqueline	Ahmed Ezzat; Rida Meyassar	Drama	1965	Sabah Bros.	1h 30m
1965	The Bank	Arabic: البنك; French: La Banque	Mohamed Salman	Taroub		Romance	1965		
1965	A Bedouin in Rome	Arabic: بدوية في روما	Mohamed Salman	Samira Tewfik; Abdel Salam Al Nabulsy	Mohamed Salman	Musical; Comedy	1965	Arab Co. for Cinema	2hr
1965	Black Jaguar	Arabic: الجكوار السوداء; French: Le jaguar noir	Mohamed Salman	Ehsan Sadek; Joseph Nano; Samir Chamas; Taroub; Nadia Hamdi	Mohsen Asamrani; Mohamed Salman	Thriller	1964	Anwar Sheikh Yassine	1h 33m
1965	In the Service of Love	Arabic: بأمر الحب	Mohamed Salman	Abdel Salam Al Nabulsy	Mohamed Salman	Romance	1965	Sabah Bros.	1h 35m
1965	The Millionaire	Arabic: المليونيرة; French: La millionnaire	Youssef Maalouf	Sabah (singer); Duraid Lahham	Mahmoud Naseer; Nehad Qalei	Comedy	1965	Elias Haddad; Elie Maasry	1h 40m
1965	Nights of the East	Arabic: ليالي الشرق; French: Nuits orientales	Elias Matta	Sabah; Fahd Ballan	Rahbani Brothers	Musical	1965	Tannous Frangieh	1h 40m
1965	The Nun	Arabic: الراهبة; French: La nonne	Hassan El Emam	Hind Rostom	Mohamed Mostafa Sami	Drama	1965	Sawtel Fan	1h 55m
1965	Reborn	Arabic: ولدت من جديد	Sayed Tantawi	Malak Sokkar; Nazha Younes; Ali Diab	Moharam Fouad	Drama	1965	Keyrouz Films	1h 30m
1965	Titans	Arabic: الجبابرة; French: Les titans	Hassib Chams	Malak Sokkar; Taroub; Jean Saadeh	Hassib Chams	Action	1965	Saadeh Bros.	1hr 51m
1965	The Two Drifters	Arabic: الشريدان	Rida Meyassar	Duraid Lahham; Samir Chamas; Nadia Gamal	Rida Meyassar	Drama	1965	Tannous Frangieh	1h 35m
1966	The Conquerors	Arabic: القاهرون; French: les conquérants	Frank Agrama	Samira Tewfik; Fahd Ballan		Drama	1966	Fawaz Bros	1h 30m
1966	The Hostage	Arabic: الرهينة; French: L'otage	Youssef Maalouf	Randa; Ehsan Sadek; Abdel Salam Al Nabulsy	Youssef Maalouf	Drama	1966		1h 30m
1966	Itab	Arabic: عتاب	Saifuddin Shawkat	Samira Tewfik; Muharram Fouad	Saifuddin Shawkat; Said Elmaghrabi	Musical	1966	Fawaz Bros.	1h 35m
1966	Love in Istanbul	Arabic: غرام في إستانبول; French: L'amour à Istanbul	Saifuddin Shawkat	Duraid Lahham; Giselle Nasr; Sevda Nur	Nehad Qalei; Saifuddin Shawkat	Romanti; Comedy	1966	Tahseen Qawadry	1h 45m
1966	Mawal (Golden Feet)	Arabic: (موال (الأقدام الذهبية; French: Mawal (Les pieds d'or)	Mohamed Salman Adana; Hassoun	Sabah (singer); Wadih El Safi; Nadia Gamal	Mohamed Salman	Musical	1966	Sabbah Bros.	1h 40m
1966	Room Number 7	Arabic: الغرفة رقم ٧ French: Chambre n°7	Kameran Hosni	Layla Rami; Ibrahim Khan; Ferial Karim	Kameran Hosni	Comedy	1966	Fawaz Bros.	1h 30m
1966	Safar Barlek	Arabic: سفر برلك	Henry Barakat	Fairuz; Elie Choueiri; Joseph Nassif; Nasri Shamseddine	Rahbani Brothers	Musical	1966	Phenicia Films	1h 55m
1966	Secret Agent 99	Arabic: 99 العميل السري; French: L'agent secret 99	Hasib Chams	Taroub; Najib Nohra	Hasib Chams	Thriller	1966	Al-Arz Studios	
1966	The Spoiled Girl	Arabic: الدلوعة; French: La gâtée	Mohamed Salman	Randa; Abdel Salam Al Nabulsy; Leïla Karam	Mohamed Salman	Drama	1966	Sabbah Bros.	1h 25m
1966	Sultana	Arabic: سلطانة	Rida Meyassar	Sammoura; Ferial Karim; Mona Wassef	Mokhtar Al Abed	Drama	1966	Syria Films	
1966	Sweet Nights	Arabic: ليالي الحلوة; French: Douces nuits	Mahmoud Naseer	Sherifa Maher; Jacquline	Mahmoud Naseer	Drama	1966	World Films	
1966	Young & Beautiful	Arabic: فيلم الصبا والجمال; French: Les jeunes et belles	Mohamed Salman	Sabah; Nadia Hamdy	Said Elmaghrabi; Mohamed Salman	Drama	1966	Salam Films	1h 40m
1966	Youth Under the Sun	Arabic: شباب تحت الشمس; French: Jeunesse au soleil	Samir Nasry	George Khater; Sami Attar; Mona Saad	Samir Nasry	Drama	1966	Anwar Sheikh Yassine	1h 40m
1967	Body Heat	Arabic: لهيب الجسد; Other: Attraction of a Body	Rida Meyassar	Fahd Ballan; Abdel Salam Al Nabulsy; Sammoura; Mayada	Rida Meyassar	Drama	1967	Anwar Sheikh Yassine	1h 30m
1967	The Guard's Daughter	Arabic: بنت الحارس; French: La fille du gardien	Henry Barakat	Fairuz; Samir Chamas; Elie Choueiri		Drama; Musical	1968	Phenicia Films	1h 40min
1967	The Misty Avenue	Arabic: شارع الضباب; French: Rue du Brouillard; Other: Fog Street	Said Tantawi	Sabah; Samira Baroudi; Samir Chamas	Hatem Khoury; Imtethal Zaki	Drama	1967	Badkach & Bondoqji	1h 30m
1967	Naked Without Sin	Arabic: عاريات بلا خطيئة; French: Nues sans péché	Alexandre Costanoff	Eghraa; Fahd Ballan	Eghraa	Erotica	1967		1h 40m
1968	Death Valley	Arabic: وادي الموت; French: Vallée de la mort	Frank Agrama	Sabah	Hatem Khoury; Said Elmaghrabi	Drama	1968	Petra Films	1h 40m
1968	Farewell to Lebanon	Arabic: وداعاً يا لبنان	Howard Avedis	Marlene Schmidt; Youssef El Ani; Elie Snaifer; Yvette Sursock; Marcelle Marina	Howard Avedis	Drama	1968	Kairouz Film	1h 40m
1969	Does	Arabic: غزلان; French: Biches	Samir El Ghoussayni	Samira Tewfik; Naji Jaber	Samir El Ghoussayni	Drama	1969		
1969	Heroes and Women	Arabic: ابطال ونساء; French: Des heroes et des femmes	Mohamed Selmane	Jean Saadeh; André Saadeh; Nabila Ebeid; Madiha Kamel	Said Elmaghrabi	Drama; Romance	1969	Fawaz Bros. Films	95 mins
1969	We Are All Freedom Fighters	Arabic: كلنا فدائيون	Gary Garabedian	Omar Aawarki; Zain Al Sidani; Samir Atar	Gary Garabedian; Antoine Ghandour; Ghassan Matar	Drama	1969	Edmond Nahas Films	1h 28m

== 1970s ==
Year	Title	Other Titles	Director	Cast	Writer	Genre	Release	Production	Length
1970	The Loss	Arabic: الضياع	Muhammad Salman	Rushdy Abaza; Samira Ahmed; Nahed Sherif; Nadia Al-Gindi; Ghassan Matar	Faris Yoachim; Muhammad Salman	Drama	1971		1h 30m
1971	Golden Sands	Arabic: رمال من ذهب; French: Sables d'or Spanish: Como un ídolo de arena	Youssef Chahine	Paul Bargue; Afwallah Ahmed Battoul; Antonio de Jesús	Youssef Chahine; José Luis Merino; Ihsan Abdel Quddous	Drama	1971	Moudallel Films (Lebanon); Petruka Films (Spain)	1h 29m
1971	World of Fame	Arabic: عالم الشهرة	Muhammad Salman	Ferial Karim; Afif Chaya; Samir Chamas	Muhammad Salman	Drama; Comedy	1971		1h 40m
1972	Paris and Love	Arabic: باريس والحب	Muhammad Salman	Salah Zulfikar; Sabah	Mohamed Othman; Mohamed Salman	Romantic; Drama	1972		1h 32m
1973	Words of Love	Arabic: كلام في الحب; French: Des mots de l'amour	Mohamed Selmane	Sabah; Ehsan Sadek	Essam Al Maghraby; Samir Khafagi	Comedy	1973	Sabah Bros.	1h 30m
1973	Musk and Amber	Arabic: مسك وعنبر	Ahmed Diaa Aldin	Duraid Lahham; Nabila Obeid; Ahmad Ramzy; Nahed Sherif; Ferial Karim	Youssef Issa; Michel Tuama	Drama	1973	Elias Haddad Films	1h 30m
1974	My Beloved	Arabic: حبيبتي	Henry Barakat	Faten Hamama; Mahmoud Yassin	Jaipur Valazi; Abdel Hay Adeeb	Drama	1974	Atef Rizk	
1974	The Hour of Liberation Has Arrived	Arabic: ساعة التحرير دقت; French: L'heure de la libération a sonné	Heiny Srour		Heiny Srour	Documentary	1974	Srour Films	1h 2m
1975	Beirut Oh Beirut	Arabic: بيروت يا بيروت; French:	Maroun Baghdadi	Ezzat El Alaili; Mireille Maalouf; Joseph Bou Nassar	Oussama El-Aref	Drama	1975	New Company for Cinema & TV	1h 51m
1976	Kafarkala	Arabic: "كفركلا"				Documentary	1976		
1976	The South Is Fine, How About You		Maroun Baghdadi		Maroun Baghdadi	Documentary	1976		
1977	Greetings to Kamal Jumblat	Arabic: كمال جنبلاط	Maroun Baghdadi	Yasser Arafat; Kamal Jumblatt	Maroun Baghdadi	Documentary	1977		
1978	Lebanon... Why?	Arabic: لبنان... لماذا؟ French: Liban... Pourquoi?	Georges Chamchoum		Georges Chamchoum	Documentary	1978	Camera 9 Group 4	1h 45m
1978	The Most Beautiful of All Mothers	Arabic: أجمل الأمهات; French: La Plus Belle Des Mères	Maroun Baghdadi		Maroun Baghdadi	Short; Documentary	1978		30 mins
1978	Ninety		Maroun Baghdadi		Maroun Baghdadi	Documentary	1978		
1979	The Martyr		Maroun Baghdadi		Maroun Baghdadi	Documentary	1979		54 mins
1979	The Story of a Village and a War		Maroun Baghdadi						
1979	We Are All for the Fatherland	Arabic: كلنا للوطن	Maroun Baghdadi		Maroun Baghdadi	Documentary	1979	Nadi Lekol Nas	1h 20m

== 1980s ==
Year	Title	Other Titles	Director	Cast	Writer	Genre	Release	Production	Length
1980	The Procession		Maroun Baghdadi		Maroun Baghdadi	Documentary	1980		
1980	Whispers	Arabic: "همسات"; French: Murmures	Maroun Baghdadi	Nadia Tuéni; Marcel Khalife; Nabil Ismail	Maroun Baghdadi	Documentary	1980	Fondation; Nadia Tuéni	1h 32m
1980	The Last Days of Summer	Arabic: آخر الصيف; French: La Fin d'été	Marwan Rahbani	Ronza; Fadia Tomb; Wahid Jalal; Hekmat Wehbe; Melhem Barakat; Sammy Clark	Marwan Rahbani; Ghadi Rahbani	Musical	1980		1h 40m
1981	The Adventurers	Arabic: لمغامرونا; French: Les aventuriers	Samir El Ghoseini	Ahmad El Zein; Howaida; Michel Tabet; Mohammed Moula; Madonna	Samir El Ghoseini	Action	1981	Saïdoun & Moula Films	1h 27m
1981	Beirut, The Encounter	Arabic: بيروت إلى اللقاء; French: Beyrouth - La rencontre German: Das Treffen in Beirut	Borhane Alaouié	Nadine Acoury; Renée Dick; Haithem El Amine; Najoua Haydar	Ahmed Beydoun	Drama	1982	Ciné Libre; Etablissement Arabe de Production; Cinémato graphique (EAPC)	2h 5m
1982	The Affairs	Arabic: "الصفقة"	Samir El Ghoseini	Antoine Hajal; Antoine Karbaj; Roula Hamadeh	Samir El Ghoseini	Drama	1982	Mohammed Saïdoun Films	1h 40m
1982	The Explosion	Arabic: "الإنفجار"	Rafic Hajjar	Madeleine Tabar; Abd El-Majid Majzoub Ahmad Zain	Rafic Hajjar	Drama	1982		
1982	Lebanon in Spite of Everything	Arabic: "لبنان رغم كل شيء"; French: Le Liban, malgré tout	André Gédéon		André Gédéon	Documentary	1982		
1982	Little Wars	Arabic: "حروب صغيرة"; French: Les petites guerres	Maroun Baghdadi	Soraya Khoury; Roger Hawa; Nabil Ismail; Rida Khoury; Rifaat Tarabay	Maroun Bagdadi; Kamal Kassar	Drama	1982		
1983	Counterfeit	Arabic: المزيفة; French: La Contrefaire	Sobhi Seifeddine	Joseph Nano; Adel Noon	Sobhi Seifeddine	Drama	1983		
1984	Amani Under the Rainbow	Arabic: أماني تحت قوس قزح; French: Amani sous l'arc-en-ciel	Samir Khoury	Majid Avioni; Philip Jabbour; Remi Bendali; Ramona Kamber	Samir Khoury	Drama	1984	Nimr Films	1h 47m
1984	Leila and the Wolves	Arabic: "ليلى والذئاب"	Heiny Srour	Nabila Zeitouni	Heiny Srour	Documentary	1984	British Film Institute (BFI); Leila Films; Ministère Nationale et de la Culture Française; NCO & Novib	
1985	At the Mercy of the Wind	Arabic: في مهب الريح; French: Au gré des vents	Zinardi Habis	Amal Saliba; Wahid Jalal; Christine Choueiri	Zinardi Habis	Drama	1985		1h 35m
1985	Deflowered		Afif J. Arabi		Afif J. Arabi	Short	1985	DXM	
1985	Marmoura	Arabic: المرمورة	Weaam El Saeedy	Melhem Barakat; Sonia Elijah; Ali Diab	Karim Abou Chakra	Comedy	1985	Raqm Qiasi Films	1h 40m
1985	A Suspended Life	Arabic: غزل البنات; French: Adolescente, sucre d'amour	Jocelyne Saab	Jacques Weber; Hala Bassam; Juliet Berto; Youssef Housni	Gérard Brach; Jocelyn Saab	Drama	1985	Aleph Production; Cinévidéo; Sigmarc; U.P.C.T.	1h 30m
1986	At the Times of Pearls	Arabic: أيام اللولو; French: Au temps ded perles	Weaam El Saeedy	Sabah; Karim Abou Chakra; Nadia Hamdy	Karim Abou Chakra	Musical	1986	Michel Majdalani	1h 45m
1986	"Between us"	French: "Entre Nous"	Afif J. Arabi		A J Arabi	Short	1986	DXM	
1986	Theater in Lebanon	French: Le Théâtre au Liban	Jean Daoud			Documentary			
1986	Wild Flowers: Women of South Lebanon		Jean Khalil Chamoun; Mai Masri		Jean Khalil Chamoun; Mai Masri	Documentary	1987	Nour Productions	
1987	Adam and Eve		Afif J. Arabi		Assad Fouladkar	Short	1987	DXM	
1987	A Country Above Wounds	Arabic: وطن فوق الجراح; French: Un pays, les plaies, un déplacement	Sobhi Seifeddine	Amal Afaish; Akram El-Ahmar	Sobhi Seifeddine	Drama	1987	Mohammed Yassine Presents	1h 30m
1987	The Veiled Man	French:Homme voilé, L	Maroun Baghdadi	Bernard Giraudeau; Michel Piccoli; Laure Marsac	Maroun Bagdadi; Didier Decoin				
1987	The Land of Honey and Incense	French: Liban, le pays du miel et de l'encens	Maroun Baghdadi			Documentary	1987		
1987	Our Night	Arabic:"ليلنا"; French: Notre nuit	Yasmine Khlat			Documentary	1987	Middle East Communication Center; Institute du Monde Arabe; Centre Audiovisuel Simone de Beauvoir; Institut National de l'Audiovisuel (INA)	
1987	The Shadow		Hisham Bizri		Hisham Bizri	Short	1987	Muquarnas Cinema	12m
1987	Phantasmagoria		Hisham Bizri		Hisham Bizri	Short	1987	Muquarnas Cinema	12m
1987	The Sun		Hisham Bizri		Hisham Bizri	Short	1987	Muquarnas Cinema	12m
1988	Beirut: The Last Home Movie	Gaby Bustros	Jennifer Fox		Jennifer Fox; John Mullen	Documentary	1987	Zohe Film Production; Valley Filmworks; WGBH	2h 3m
1988	The Third of May		Hisham Bizri		Hisham Bizri	Short	1988	Muquarnas Cinema	20m
1989	The Professional		Afif J. Arabi		Afif J. Arabi	Short	1989	DXM	
1989	The Ridiculous Man		Hisham Bizri		Hisham Bizri	Short	1989	Muquarnas Cinema	22m
1989	War Generation	Arabic: جيل الحرب	Mai Masri; Jean Khalil Chamoun		Mai Masri; Jean Khalil Chamoun	Documentary	1989	BBC	50m
1989	Where's Maria?		Afif J. Arabi		Afif J. Arabi	Short	1989	DXM	

== 1990s ==
Year	Title	Other Titles	Director	Cast	Writer	Genre	Release	Production	Length
1990	Absence	Arabic: غيابا; French: L'absence	Mohamed Soueid		Mohamed Soueid	Documentary	1990		45m
1990	Children of Fire	Arabic: اطفال النار; French: Enfants du feu	Mai Masri		Mai Masri	Documentary	1991		
1990	"Q.A.R.I."		Afif J. Arabi		Afif J. Arabi	Short	1990	DXM	
1990	"Anima"		Afif J. Arabi; Carlos Atie		Afif J. Arabi	Short	1990	DXM	
1991	Cypress Leaves	French:Les Feuilles de cyprès	Hisham Bizri		Hisham Bizri	Short (15 min)	1991	Muqarnas; Cinema	
1991	Out of Life	Arabic: خارج الحياة; French: Hors la vie	Maroun Bagdadi	Hippolyte Girardot; Rafic Ali Ahmad; Hussein Sbeity	Maroun Bagdadi, Didier Decoin	Drama	15 May 1991	Galatée Films	
1991	"Terrorism of the Mind"		Afif J. Arabi	Micheline Chalhoub	Afif J. Arabi	Drama	1991	DXM	
1991	Vertov's Valentine		Hisham Bizri		Hisham Bizri	Short (10 min)	1990	Muqarnas; Cinema	
1992	The Tornado	Arabic: "الإعصار"	Samir Habshi	Fadi Abou Khalil; Philippe Akiki; Chehade El-Hatchiti	Samir Habchi	Drama	1992		
1992	Message from a Dead Man		Hisham Bizri		Hisham Bizri	Short (30 min)	1992	Muqarnas; Cinema	
1993	Operation Golden Phoenix		Jalal Merhi	Loren Avedon; James Hong; Nicole Bardawil	J. Stephen Maunder; Samir Ghouseine; Kevin Ward	Thriller	1994	Film One Productions; Film One; Le Monde Entertainment	
1994	Hostage of Time		Jean K. Chamoun			Documentary	1994		50mins
1994	Proximities		Afif J. Arabi		A J Arabi	Experimental		DXM	
1994	Time Has Come	Arabic: "آن الأوان"; French: Histoire d'un retour	Jean-Claude Codsi	Simon Abkarian; Darina Al Joundi; Nati Sourati	Jean-Claude Codsi, Talal Haidar	Drama	1994	Aflam Films	
1995	Credits Included: A Video in Red and Green		Jalal Toufic	Walid Raad, Jalal Toufic	Jalal Toufic	Documentary	1995		
1995	Once Upon a Time in Beirut	Arabic: "كان يا ما كان بيروت"; French: Il était une fois Beyrouth	Jocelyn Saab	Emile Accar; Pierre Chammassian; Myrna Maakaron; Michele Tyan	Philippe Paringaux; Roland-Pierre Paringaux	Drama	1995	Aleph; Producciones S.A. Arte; Balcon Production	
1996	Warshots	German: Kriegsbilder	Heiner Stadler	Herbert Knaup	Harald Göckeritz; Heiner Stadler	Drama	1996	Bayerischer Rundfunk (BR)	
1996	Taxi Service	Arabic: "تاكسي سرڤيسز"; French: Taxi Service	Elie Khalifé; Alexandre Monnier			Short	1996	Ventura Films	
1997	Thank You Natex	French: Merci Natex	Elie Khalifé			Short	1997	Ventura Films	
1997	Havi, El								
1997	Mitologies		Hisham Bizri						
1998	Algiers-Beirut, For Memory	French: Alger-Beyrouth: Pour mémoire	Merzak Allouache			Drama	1998	La Sept/Arte; Cinétévé; Djinn House Productions	
1998	Children of Shatila	Arabic: "أطفال شاتيلا"; French:Les Enfants de Chatilla	Mai Masri		Mai Masri	Documentary	1998		
1998	Phantom Beirut	Arabic: "أشباح بيروت"; French: Beyrouth fantôme	Ghassan Salhab	Carol Abboud; Darina El Joundi	Ghassan Salhab	Drama	1998	GH Films; Idéa Productions; Optima Film	
1998	Wayn Yo!		André Chammas			Short	1998		
1998	West Beyrouth	Arabic: "بيروت الغربية"; French: West Beyrouth	Ziad Doueiri	Rami Doueiri; Mohamad Chamas; Carmen Lebbos	Ziad Doueiri	Drama	1998	38 Productions; ACCI; Centre National de la Cinématographie (CNC); Ciné Libre; Douri Films	
1998	Las Meninas		Hisham Bizri		Hisham Bizri	Short	1998		
1999	Around the Pink House	Arabic: "البيت الزهري"); French: Autour de la maison rose	Joana Hadjithomas; Khalil Joreige	Hanane Abboud; Fadi Abi Samra; Asma Andraos	Joana Hadjithomas; Khalil Joreige	Drama	1999	CCT; Canal (II); Canal Horizons	
1999	Beirut Palermo Beirut		Mahmoud Hojeij	Rima Kshief; Mohamed Shrief; Zeina Shrief		Short film	1999		
1999	A Civilized People	Arabic: "المتحضرات"; French: Civilisées	Randa Chahal Sabag	Jalila Baccar; Carmen Lebbos; Myrna Maakaron	Randa Chahal Sabag	Drama	1999	Canal+ Ciné Manufacture; Euripide Productions; France 2 Cinéma; Havas Images; Leil Productions; Vega Film	
1999	The Cream and the Cogwheel	French:Crème et crémaillère	Rima Samman	Carlos Chahine; Fejria Deliba; Karim Ziadeh; Sari Zyadé	Rima Samman	Short	1999	Groupe de Recherches et d'Essais Cinemato graphiques (GREC)	
1999	The Shower	French:La Douche	Michel Kammoun	Raymond Hosni	Michel Kammoun	Short			
1999	My Beard Forever		Afif J. Arabi	Afif J Arabi	A J Arabi	Drama (short)	1999	DXM	

== 2000s ==
Year	Title	Title in Arabic & French	Director	Cast	Writer	Genre	Release	Production	Length
2000	S.L.Film		Shady Hanna	Fadi Reaidi; Adel Karam; Naim Halawi; Rola Shamiyi	Chady Hannah; Naim Halawi	Comedy	2000		90 min
2000	In the Shadows of the City	Arabic: "طيف المدينة"	Jean Khalil Chamoun	Majdi Machmouchi; Christine Choueiri; Sarah Mrad; Rami Bayram; Ammar Chalak; Ahmed Itani	Jean Khalil Chamoun; Mai Masri	Drama	2001	Nour Productions	105 min
2001	Hostage: The Bachar Tapes		Walid Raad		Walid Raad	Experimental; Documentary	2001		16 min
2001	The Chair	French: La Chaise	Cynthia Choucair	Dany Chamoun; Georges Rached	Cynthia Choucair	Short	2001	Aimée Boulos	21 min
2001	Frontiers of Dreams and Fears	Arabic: "أحلام المنفى"	Mai Masri	Manar Faraj; Mona Zaaroura		Documentary	2001	Nour Productions	56 min
2001	When Maryam Spoke Out	Arabic: "لمّا حكيت مريم"; French: Quand Maryam s'est dévoilée	Assad Fouladkar	Bernadette Hodeib; Talal El-Jordi; Renée Dick	Assad Fouladkar	Drama	2001		1h 39min
2002	Chabrol in Biarritz	French: Chabrol á Biarritz	Hisham Bizri	Claude Chabrol	Hisham Bizri		2002	Muqarnas Cinema	23 min
2002	City of Brass		Hisham Bizri	Misha Kusnatsov; Nicole Wilder; Ellis Foster; Amos Ellis; Richard Wallace	Hisham Bizri	Short		Muqarnas Cinema	23 min
2002	Civil War	Arabic: حرب أهلية; French: Guerre civile	Mohamed Soueid		Mohamed Soueid	Documentary	2002	Ayloul	1h 25m
2002	The Encounter	French: La Rencontre	Hisham Bizri	Muriel Romero; Florence Concile; Régis Ansola; Christian Paterne; Ginou Larrouilh; Jean-Claude Attal	Hisham Bizri; Jorge Luis Borges	Short		Muqarnas Cinema	28 min
2002	How I Love You	Arabic:"كيف احبك"; French: Comment je t'aime	Akram Zaatari		Akram Zaatari	Documentary; LGBT	2002		29 min
2002	Terra Incognita	Arabic: "أرض مجهولة"; French: Terra incognita	Ghassan Salhab	Carol Abboud, Rabih Mroué	Ghassan Salhab	Drama	2002		1 hr 59 min
2002	The Wind of Beirut	French: Le vent de Beyrouth	Fouad Alaywan	Carol Abboud		Short	2003		18 min
2003	The Ashes of the Phoenix	French: Les Cendres du phénix	Romuald Sciora; Valérie Vincent		Mansour Labaky	Documentary	2003		
2003	The Kite	French: Le Cerf-volant	Randa Chahal Sabag	Flavia Bechara; Liliane Nemri; Ziad Rahbani; Renée Dick	Randa Chahal Sabag	Drama	2003	Arte France Cinéma; Gimages; Leil Productions	1h 20min
2003	Elie Feyrouz		Cynthia Choucair	Elie Darwish	Cynthia Choucair	Short; Documentary	2003		14 min
2003	Lady of the Palace	French: La Dame du palais	Samir Habchi		Georges Ghanem; Samir Habchi	Documentary	2004	MISR International Films	58 min
2003	Non métrage libanais	French: Non métrage libanais	Ghassan Koteit; Wissam Smayra	Elie Haswani, Nadine Labaki; Fouad Alaywan	Ghassan Koteit; Wissam Smayra	Short	2003		11 min
2003	Prêt-à-porter Imm Ali	French: Prêt-à-porter Imm Ali	Dima El Horr	Mariam Assaf; Hussein Chehab; Ahmad Farhat	Dima El-Horr; Rabih Mroue	Short	2003		27 min
2003	Ramad								
2003	Safar								
2003	Saving Face		Jalal Toufic						
2003	This Day	Arabic: اليوم; French: Aujourd'hui	Akram Zaatari		Akram Zaatari	Documentary	2003		1h 26m
2003	Vertices		Hisham Bizri		Hisham Bizri	Short; Experimental	2003	Muqarnas Cinema	33 min
2004	"Berlin Beirut"	Arabic: برلين بيروت; French: "Beyrouth Berlin"	Myrna Maakaron	Maria Toma; Philippe Farhat	Myrna Maakaron	Short	2004	Credofilm	23 mins
2004	Fi haza al bayt		Akram Zaatari		Short Film				
2004	In The Battlefields	Arabic:معارك حب French:Dans les champs de bataille	Danielle Arbid	Marianne Feghali; Rawia Elchab; Carmen Lebbos	Danielle Arbid	Drama	2004	Quo Vadis Cinéma; Versus Production; Taxi Films	1h 30min
2004	Ring of Fire	Arabic:زنار النار French:Cercle de feu	Bahij Hojeij	Nida Wakim; Hassan Farhat; Bernadette Hodeib	Bahij Hojeij; Rachid El Daif	Drama	2004	Portrait & Company	1h 30min
2004	The Mattress	French: Le Matelas	Antoine Waked	Raymond Hosni; Wissam Smayra	Antoine Waked	Short; Thriller	2004		7 mins
2005	After Shave	French: Beyrouth après-rasage	Hany Tamba	Rafic Ali Ahmad; Mahmoud Mabsout; Julia Kassar; Fady Reaidy	Hany Tamba	Short	2005	Bizibi VIP Films; Centre National de la Cinémato graphie	26 min
2005	The Big Fall		Antoine Waked		Antoine Waked	Short; Animation	2005		5mins
2005	Bosta	French: Bosta l'autobus	Philippe Aractingi	Rodney El Haddad; Nadine Labaki; Liliane Nemri; Nada abou Farhat	Philippe Aractingi	Musical	2005	Fantascope Production	2h 22min
2005	Zozo		Josef Fares	Imad Creidi; Antoinette Turk; Elias Gergi; Carmen Lebbos	Josef Fares	Drama	2005	Memfis Film; Film i Väst; Sigma Films	1h 45min
2005	From Beyrouth with Love	French: Ça sera beau	Waël Noureddine		Waël Noureddine	Short; Documentary	2005	Bizibi	31 min
2005	Giallo		Antoine Waked	Serge Jamo; Raia Haidar; Salim Badrane		Short; Thriller			
2005	Massacre	French: Massaker	Monika Borgmann; Lokman Slim; Hermann Theissen; Nina Menkes		Monika Borgmann; Hermann Theissen	Documentary	2005	Zootrope Films	1h 38min
2005	The Final Scene	Arabic: "المشهد الأخير"	Ghassan Estephan	Ammar Shalak; Bernadette Hodeib; Wafaa Tarabay; Khaled El Sayed	Joseph Abu Dames	Drama	2005		
2005	Perfect Day, A	Arabic: "يوم آخر"; French: Naoussé	Joana Hadjithomas; Khalil Joreige	Ziad Saad; Julia Kassar; Alexandra Kahwagi	Joana Hadjithomas; Khalil Joreige	Drama	2005	Abbout Productions; Twenty Twenty Vision; Filmproduktion GmbH; Mille et Une Productions	1h 28min
2005	Asmahan	Arabic: "اسمهان"	Hisham Bizri	Asmahan; Youssef Wahbi; Mahmoud el-Meliguy	Hisham Bizri	Short; Experimental	2005	Muqarnas Cinema	21 min
2006	Boum... Tac		Yasmine Al Massri			Short; Experimental	2006		6 min
2006	From My Window, Without a Home...	French: De ma fenêtre, sans maison ...	Maryanne Zéhil	Louise Portal; Renée Thomas; Walid Al Alayli	Maryanne Zéhil	Drama	2006	Mia Productions	1h 28min
2006	Her Father's Brat	Arabic: "غنّوجة بيها"	Elie F. Habib	Rita Barsona; Peter Semaan Nadine El Rassi	Mona Tayeh	Comedy	2006	Roua Productions	
2006	The Last Man	Arabic: "أطلال"; French: Le Dernier homme	Ghassan Salhab	Carlos Chahine; Raymond Hosni; May Sahab	Ghassan Salhab	Drama	2006	Abbout Productions; Agat Films & Cie; Arte	1h 41min
2006	Falafel	Arabic: "فلافل"	Michel Kammoun	Elie Mitri; Michel Hourani; Gabrielle Bou Rached	Michel Kammoun	Romantic Comedy	2006	Ciné-Sud Promotion; Roy Films SARL	1h 23min
2006	Invisible Children		Carol Mansour	Bobby Bailey; Laren Poole; Jason Russell	Carol Mansour	Documentary	2006		55min
2006	What Revolution	French: Quelle révolution	Lina Khatib		Lina Khatib	Short; Documentary	2006		9 min
2007	Fouad's Adventure		Gioergo Piconi	Alfred Chekiee; Carmelo Picone; Joseph Abi Damaas					
2007	Caramel	Arabic: "سكر بنات"; French: Caramel	Nadine Labaki	Aziza Semaan; Yasmine Elmasri; Joanna Mkarzel; Gisèle Osta; Adel Karam	Nadine Labaki; Rodney Haddad	Romantic Comedy	2007	Les Films Des Tournelles; Roissy Films	1h 35min
2007	A Lost Man	Arabic: "رجل ضائع"; French: Un homme perdu	Danielle Arbid	Melvil Poupaud; Alexander Siddig; Darina Al Joundi	Danielle Arbid	Drama	2007	MK2 Productions	1h 33min
2007	Zone frontalière		Christophe Karabache			Experimental; Documentary	2007		
2007	Under the Bombs	French: Sous les bombes Arabic: تحت القصف	Philippe Aractingi	Nada Abou Farhat; Georges Khabbaz					1h 38min
2007	Khalass		Burhan Alaouie	Fadi Abi-Khalil; Natasha Ashkar; Refaat Tarabay; Nada Abou Farhat					
2007	Leylet eid			Rita Barsona; Peter Semaan	Comedy				
2007	Falling From Earth		Chadi Zeneddine	Rafik Ali Ahmad; Carmen Lebbos; Ammar Shalak; Naya Salamé; Yamen Sukkarieh; Nicole Kamato; Imad Creid					
2008	After the Wars...	French: Après la guerre, c'est toujours la guerre...	Samir Abdallah	Nahla Chahal; Walid Charara; Tamam Mroué	Samir Abdallah	Drama	2008	Vidéo-de-Poche	1h 22m
2008	Khalik ma'ae		Elie F. Habib	Ammar Shalak; Nadine Al Rassi; Majdi Mashmoushi; Hisham Bou Sleiman; Omar Mikati; Khitam Laham; Carla Boutros			2008		
2008	Childish Love	French: Amour d'Enfants	Fares Khalil	Elie Mitri; Sarah Warde; Lisa Guiragossian; Chris El-Jorr; Majdi Machmouchi		Romantic; Comedy	2008	Crystalline Pictures	1h 44m
2008	Melodrama Habibi		Hany Tamba	Patrick Chesnais; Julia Kassar; Pierre Chammassian; Fadi Reaidy	Drama; Comedy				
2008	My Heart Only Beats For Her	Arabic: "ما هتفت لي غيرها"		Mohamed Soueid			Documentary	2008	O3 Productions
2008	Madame Bambino		Caroline Milan	Fady Charbel, Carine Rizkallah	Family, comedy		Fady Charbel; Carine Rizkallah	Marwa Group; Green production House	
2008	Beirut Open City		Samir Habchi	Khaled El Nabawi; Rodney Haddad; Diamand Abou Abboud; Cyrine Abdelnour	Drama				
2008	I Want to See		Joana Hadjithomas; Khalil Joreige	Catherine Deneuve; Rabih Mroué	Drama				
2008	The One Man Village (Semaan bil Daya'a)		Simon El Habre		Feature Documentary			Beirut DC	
2008	"Song for the Deaf Ear"		Hisham Bizri		Hisham Bizri	Short	2008	Muqarnas Cinema	
2009	1958	1958	Ghassan Salhab	Aouni Kawas; Zahia Salhab	Ghassan Salhab	Documentary	2009	Abbout Productions	
2009	Abu Riad								
2009	All Birds Whistle		Roy Khalil	Joseph Abou Khalil; Kamal El Helou; Leila Hakim	Roy Khalil; Sandra Khalil	Short			
2009	Beirut, I Love You	French: Beyrouth, Je t'aime	Mounia Akl; Cyril aris	Mounia akl Cyril aris					
2009	Charbel	Arabic: "شربل"	Nabil Lebbos	Antoine Balabane; Elie Mitri; Julia Kassar; Ghassan Estephan; Khaled El Sayed; Toni Maalouf		Biopic	2009		1h 44m
2009	Every Day Is a Holiday		Dima El-Horr	Hiam Abbas; Manal Khader; Raïa Haidar	Drama				
2009	Help	French: Au secours	Marc Abi Rached	Hussein Maatouk; Johanna Andraos; Khalil El Zein	Marc Abi Rached	Drama	2009	Frame By Frame	1h 30m
2009	Shola Cohen: The Pearl		Fouad El Khoury	Darine Hamze					
2009	Silina(hala wal malek)		Miriame Fares; Antoine Kerbej; Georges Khabbaz	Drama					
2009	Siraj al Wady			Drama, Religion					
2009	Tattooed Eye	Arabic: "وشم بالعين"; French: L'arme à l'œil	Youmna Itani	Omar Thalgé; Ihab Mohammad; Abdallah Lababidi; Othman El-Eter; Zakaria Mikati	Youmna Itani	Short	2009	Darkside; Fonds Francophone; Samer Mohdad	30 mins
2009	Wadi Khaled		Christophe Karabache			Documentary			

== 2010s ==
Year	Title	Other Titles	Director	Cast	Writer	Genre	Release	Production	Length
2010	The End of a Dream	Arabic: نهاية حلم	Charles; Chlala	Fady Tabet; Ward El Khal; Nahla Daoud		Drama, Religion	January 2010		
2010	Dirty Mirror		Mirna Mounayar						
2010	Kfarmatta, Forbidden Village	French: Kfarmatta, village interdit	Mirna Mounayar			Documentary			
2010	Beirut Kamikaze		Christophe; Karabache		Christophe Karabache	Experimental; Documentary	November 2011		
2010	Film of welcome and farewells		Corine; Shawi			Documentary			
2010	Kamis el Souf		Elie; Elias	Rola Hamada, Gil Chalhoub, Nada Abou Farhat		Drama; TV			Evolution8 SARL production (Lebanon)
2010	The Road North		Carlos Chahine	Camille Figuéréo; Rami Kadeih; Fadi Abi Samra	Carlos Chahine	Short film	May 25	Paul Saadoun; Samuel Chauvin	25 min
2010	Tripoli Quiet		Rania Attieh; Daniel Garcia				May 25		
2010	Tomorrow 6:30		Gilles Tarazi				May 25		
2010	A Sheherazade Tale		Rami Kodeih				May 25		
2010	Wednesday		Talal Khoury				May 25		
2010	Saint Doumit						August	Tele Lumiere	
2010	Lebanese Film Festival 2010						August		
2010	Al Tariq Al Masdoud (Closed Road)						August 5		
2010	Beyt Byout		Sana Atris			Documentary			
2010	Cinema Days Of Beirut (Festival)						September		
2010	12 Angry Lebanese		Zeina Daccache				September		
2010	Every Day is a Holiday		Dima El-Horr	Hiam Abbas, Manal Khader; Raïa Haidar		Drama	October (Lebanon Release)	Worldwide Festivals	
2010	What's going on?		Jocelyne Saab	Ishtar Yasin Gutiérrez; Joumana Haddad; Raia Haidar		Drama Musical Fantasy Romance	April, October 8, 2010 (Lebanon's release)		
2010	Yanoosak		Elie Khalife, Alexandre Monnier	Zeina Daccache, Siegfried Terpoorten; Alexandra Kahwaji	Elie Khalife	Comedy, Romance	October 21	Taxi Films, Abbout Productions, Post Office	
2010	Like A Dream	Arabic: متل الحلم	Patrick Daou, Christopher Karkafi	Farid Reaidy; Christopher Karkafi; Patrick Daou, Pascal Ghanem	Christofer Karkafi	Drama	November 4	Christopher Karkafi	Record-Breaking (see page)
2010	A History Lesson		Hady Zaccak				November 18		
2010	What Happened?		De Gaulle Eid			Documentary; Film	November 26		
2010	A Film		Hisham Bizri			Avant-garde; Short		Hisham Bizri (Conception); Muqarnas; Cinema	9 min
2011	Stray Bullet	Arabic: "رصاصة طايشة"; French: Balle Perdue	Georges Hachem	Nadine Labaki; Takla Chamaoun; Badih Abou Chakra; Rodrigue Sleiman	Georges Hachem	Drama	2010	Abbout Productions; Visual Eye	1h 15min
2011	Here Comes The Rain	Arabic: "شتّي يا دني"; French: Que vienne la pluie	Bahij Hojeij	Carmen Lebbos; Julia Kassar; Bernadette Hodeib; Diamond Abou Abboud; Paul Baboudjian		Drama	2010		1h 38min
2011	On the Path of the Straw	French: Sur les chemins de la paille							
2011	Malaki, Scent Of An Angel		Khalil Dreifus Zaarour			Drama	March 31	Khalil Dreifus Zaarour	
2011	Sorry Mom		Yuri Mrakadi & Emad El Rifai	Nadine N. Njeim; Nancy Afiouni; Aziz Abdo	Yuri Mrakadi; Emad El Rifai; Loubna machalah	Thriller	June 9	Peribas, Yuri M. Productions and Hannouch holding	
2011	Yawman Ma (Someday)		Georges Khabbaz	Georges Khabbaz; Bernadette Houdeib; Diamond Bou Abboud	Claudia Marchelian	TvFilm	September 7		Will Be Aired On Lebanese Broadcasting Corporation
2011	Where do we go now?		Nadine Labaki	Nadine Labaki; Leila Hakim; Leila Fouad; Claude Baz Msawbaa, Antoinette Noufaily, Anjo Rihane; Yvonne Maalouf; Adel Karam	Nadine Labaki; Rodney Haddad; Jihad Hojeily	Drama; Comedy	May 16(Cannes), September 22(Lebanon, France, Worldwide)	Les films des tournelles	People's Choice Award (Drama) at 2011 Toronto International Film Festival
2011	The Mountain	Arabic: الجبل	Ghassan Salhab	Fadi Abou Samra		Drama	November 3 (Lebanon)	Abbout Productions	
2011	Rue Huvelin		Mounir Massri	Charbel Kamel; Betty Taoutel; Adel Karam; Carmen Bsaibes	Maroun Nassar	Drama	November 17	Ne A Beyrouth, Safina Group	
2011	Rose's Land	Arabic: خلّة وردة	Adel Serhan	Ahmad Zain; Saad Hamdan; Khitam Lahham, Hasan Farhat; Pauline Haddad; Ouday Raad	Mahmoud Gaafoury	Drama	2011	Beirut International Center	1h 30m
2011	Out Loud	Arabic: صوت جريء	Samer Daboul	Rudy Moarbes, Ali Rhayem, Jad Hadid, Michel Sarkis, Eliane Kerdy, Jean Kabrously	Samer Daboul	Drama	December 8	Phoenix Eye; Pictures	Festivals
2011	Sector zero		Nadim Mishlawi	Chawki Azouri, Bernard Khoury, Hazem Saghiyeh	Nadim Mishlawi	Documentary	2011	Abbout Productions	1h 4min
2012	Cash Flow		Sami Koujan	Carlos Azar, Nadine N. Njeim, Tony Abou Jawde, Hicham Haddad, Chady Maroun, Joelle Dagher, Shant Kabakian, Teta Latifa, Anthony Najem, Samer Al Achy, Hiam Abou Chedid, Ghassan Estephan, Anthoine Balaban, Pierre Chamoun, Claude Khalil	Sami Koujan	Comedy, Action	January 26	Day Two; Pictures	
2012	Beirut Hotel		Danielle Arbid	Darine Hamze, Charles Berling, Fadi Abi Samra, Rodney Haddad, Carole Ammoun	Danielle Arbid	Romance	August 4(France), TBA (Lebanon)	Les Films; Pelléas, MAIA CINEMA	
2012	My Last Valentine in Beirut 3D		Salim El Turk	Laurraine Kodeih, Shady Hanna, Mohamad Hijazi, Aziz Abdo, Ziad Said, Ghassan Kairallah, Paul Matar	Salim El Turk		February	T-Group Production	
2012	Taxi Ballad		Daniel Joseph	Talal El Jerdi, Karina Log, Mahmoud Mabsout (Fahman), Tarek Tamim, Badih Abu Chakra, Hiam Abou Chedid	Daniel Joseph	Drama, Comedy	March 8	Mina Street and 4 Productions	
2012	A Man of Honor	Arabic: إنسان شريف	Jean-Claude Codsi	Majdy Machmouchy, Caroline Hatem, Chadi Haddad, Rana Hassan, Mahmoud Saiid, Leila Hakim, Bernadette Houdeib, Houssam Sabbah, Aida Sabra, Claudine Sfeir, Mohamed Haidar, Issam Abou Khaled, Salimah Tohmeh, Julien Shmid, Haytham Ismael, Hasan Mohieddine, Salim Ala'el Din			March 29		
2012	33 Days		Jamal Chorja	Bassem Moughniyyeh, Nisrine Tafech, Youssef el khal, Darine Hamze, Carmen Lebbos, Pierre Dagher, Kinda Aallouch	Hiyam Abou Chedid		April 19		
2012	A Play Entitled Sehnsucht		Badran Roy Badran	Vartan Meguerditchian, Adony Maalouf, Christian Ghazy, Cyril Bassil, Gianni Fau, Ghady Yaghy, Ziad Najjar	Badran Roy Badran	Experimental, 35mm	April 2012	Celine Abiad's "Beiroots Productions	A Play Entitled Sehnsucht is also known as the Lebanese Experimental Surrealist Film
2012	Tannoura Maxi	Arabic: تنورة ماكسي	Joe Bou Eid	Joy Karam, Chady Tineh, Carol Abboud		Drama, Romance	May 3		
2012	3:30		Hussen Ibraheem	Jebril Mohamad, Peeka Emna ben Rajib, Ahmad Massad, Abdulellah Jawarneh	Ameen Nayfeh	Drama, Western	May 18	Red Sea Institute of Cinematic Arts	Jury prize best narrative short in Franco Arab Film festival 2013, Official Selection of Rotterdam Arabic Camera Film Festival 2012
2012	Runaway		Marc Kharrat	Mirella Zoghbi, Vince Doche, Gabriel Torosyan, Hala Baki, Joseph Tallent, Martin Mikitas, Nada Salloum, Karin Awad, Elie Bahou, Charles Doche, and Angela Ryan	Elie Ayrouth, Marc Kharrat	Drama, Comedy		Alicia Neih	
2012	Marcedes		Hady Zaccak				May 31	Darkside Film& TV Production, Zac Films	
2012	Behind The Window		Nagham Abboud	Ahmad Hajir, Romy Melhem	Nagham Abboud		TBA	Ginger Beirut Productions	
2012	At Midnight		Philippe Asmar	Nadine Al Rassi, Wissam Breidy	Hiyam Abou Chedid		TBA	Marwa Group	
2012	The Wounded Bird	Arabic: الطائر الجريح		Bernadette Houdeib, Antoinette Akiki, Raymond Saliba		Melodrama, Musical	TBA		
2012	La Vallée Des Larmes		Maryanne Zéhil	Wafaa Tarabay, Walid Alayly, Layla Hakim, Talal Gerdy, Yara Fares			2011/2012		
2012	Regret	Arabic: ندم	Rindala Kodeih	Aline Lahoud, Youssef Haddad, Antoine Kerbej, Takla Chamoun, Najla Hachem, Pio Chihane, Paul Sleiman, Khaled El Sayed, Mey Sahhab, Diya Youness, Andre Mouaykel, Makhoul Makhoul, Fady Tabet, May Matta, Linda Matar	Gebran Daher	TV Film	TBA	Prime Production	Will Be Aired On Murr Television
2012	Because They Are Armenians	Arabic: لأنن أرمن	Samir Habchi	Nadine Al Rassi, Youssef Haddad, Pamela El Kik, Dalida Khalil, Mireille Panossian, Maguy Abou Ghousn	Claudia Marchelian	Drama	TBA	Marwa Group	
2012	Bad Vacation	Arabic: عطلة عاطلة	Caroline Milan	Fady Charbel, Carine Rizkallah, Nazih Youssef, Issam Breidy		Comedy	TBA		
2012	The Return	Arabic: العائد	Youssef Charaf Dinne	Ommar Chalak, Lamitta Frangieh, Wissam Hanna, Toni Issa, Fouad Charaf Dinne, Chawki Matta, Joumana Charaf Dinne, Randa Kaady, Jessy Abdo, Kamil Matta	Nadim Badour	Action, Thriller	TBA	Studio Channel	
2012	Kaysar and Cesar	Arabic: قيصر و سيزار	Walid Nassif	Pierre Chamoun, Carla Boutros, Saad Hamdan, Layal Daou, Georges Diab, Tarek Tamim	Tony Chamoun		TBA		
2012	Abdo w Abdo	Arabic: عبدو و عبدو				Comedy	TBA		
2012	Asfouri		Fouad Alaiwan	Majdi Machmouchi, Omar Al-Shammaa	Fouad Aleiwan	Drama	TBA	Fouad Aleiwan	
2012	39 Seconds		Lara Saba	Shady Haddad	Nibal Arakjy		TBA		
2012	Too Much Love Will Kill You		Christophe Karabache			Drama	January 2013		
2012	Sirocco AKA Shluq		Hisham Bizri			Avant-garde; Short	Hisham Bizri (Conception)	Muqarnas; Cinema Hisham Bizri (Producer, Editor, DP)	15 min
2013	Bebe Movie	Elie F. Habib	Youssef Al Khal, Maguy Bou Ghosn, Mirva Kadi, Sultan Deeb, Jessy Abdo, Pierre Jamajian, Pierre Chammassian, Abir Aoun, Saad Al Kadiri		Claude Saliba	Romantic Comedy	November 21	Eagle Films & Green in collaboration with VMP	
2013	The Rope	Arabic: الحبل; French: la corde	Hiba Tawaji	Nazeeh Youssef; Maya Yammine	Hiba Tawaji	Short	2012		
2014	From A to B		Ali F. Mostafa			Adventure			
2014	Insan Hayawan Chay	Arabic: إنسان،حيوان، شيء	Abdallah Sfeir	Issam Al Achkar, Khitam Laham, Julian Farhat, Tarek Yaakoub, Nader Dernaika	Adventure, Thriller	January 16	Abdallah Sfeir	3DLEBANON	
2014	Neswen		Sam Andraos, Hassan Jaber		Comedy				
2014	A Quintet		Roberto Cuzzillo		Comedy				
2014	The Sea Is Behind		Hisham Lasri	Malek Akhmiss	Drama				
2014	She & Politics		Rami Kaddoura	Yara Fares, Michel Tabet, Nadim Laham, Stephanie Ghafary, Mirvat Hakim, Ayman Timani and Imad Menhem	Action	May 1	Rami Kaddoura	Isaac Belot and the Bass & Brass Band	
2014	The Valley		Ghassan Salhab	Carol Abboud	Drama				
2014	Vitamin		Elie F. Habib		Comedy				
2014	Void		Tarek Korkomaz, Zeina Makki, Jad Beyrouthy, Christelle Ighniades, Salim Habr, Maria Abdel Karim, Naji Bechara	Carol Abboud, Latife Moultaka	Drama				
2014	Yalla Aa'belkon: Single, Married, Divorced		Elie Khalifé		Romance				
2015	For You	Arabic: من اجلكم	Fr. Charles Sawaya	Chadi Haddad, Mirana Neeymeh, Nada Saybeh, Georges Bassil	Drama; Biblical	March 23, 2015	Fr. Charles Sawaya	JuntoBox Films	
2015	Halal Love	Arabic: حب حلال	Assad Fouladkar	Darine Hamze; Rodrigue Sleiman; Zeinab Hind Khadra	Assad Fouladkar	Comedy	2015	Cedars Art Production	1h 34m
2015	Misunderstanding	Arabic: سوء تفاهم	Ahmad Samir Farag; Ahmed Maher	Cyrine Abdel; NourAhmed El-Saadany; Sharif Salamah	Mohamed Nayer	Comedy	2015	Cedars Art Production	2h
2015	Very Big Shot								
2015	Waves '98		Ely Dagher						
2015	23 Kilometres	Arabic: كيلومتر 23; Armenian: 23 կմ	Noura Kevorkian	Barkev Kevorkian; Noura Kevorkian; Serena Kevorkian	Noura Kevorkian	Documentary	2015	Musa Dagh Productions	1h 22m
2015	Princess of Rome		Hadi Muhammadian	Nasser Tahmasb, Hosni Badr Aldin, Sawsan Awwad	Zahraa Braytea, Hamed Jafari	Animation	2015	Honarpooya Group	1h 15min
2015	Breakfast in Beirut	Arabic: ترويقة في بيروت	Farah ALHashem	Farah Alhashim; Awatif Alzain; Abdelrahim Awji	Farah ALHashem	Drama	2015	VioletSkye Films	1h 10min
2016	A Maid for Each	Arabic: "مخدومين"	Maher Abi Samra		Maher Abi Samra	Documentary	2016	Orjouane Productions; Les Films d’Ici; Medieope ratørene	1h 7min
2016	Welcome to Lebanon	Arabic: "أهلًا بكم في لبنان"	Saif Sheikh Najib	Wissam Sabbagh, Shireen Abo El-Ezz, Vivianne Antonios	Mohamad Al-Saoudi	Comedy	2016	Falcon Films	100 mins
2016	What About Tomorrow?								
2017	Martyr	شهيد	Mazen Khaled	Carol Abboud Hamza Mekdad	Mazen Khaled	Feature / Drama	2018	Biennale College- Cinema Artrip Production	84 minutes
2017	In the Ruins of Baalbeck Studios	Arabic: بين هياكل ستوديو بعلبك; French: Dans les ruines des studios de Baalbeck	Siska	Alexandre Paulikevitch; Fredrika Brillembourg; Georges Nasser; Jerome Abi Saleh; Ibrahim Takkoush	Siska	Short; Documentary	2018	Culture Resource	48 mins
2017	Lilacs	Arabic: "ليلك"; French: Lilas	Mira Shaib	Julian Farhat, Aïda Sabra, Shaden Fakih	Mira Shaib	Short; Drama	2017	Filmakademie Baden-Württemberg; Robert Bosch Stiftung	24 mins
2017	Panoptic	Arabic: بانوبتيك	Rana Eid		Rana Eid	Documentary	2017	Abbout Productions; DB Studios; Ginger Beirut Productions	1h 19min
2018	Capernaum		Nadine Labaki		Drama				
2018	Heaven Without People	Arabic: غداء العيد	Lucien Bourjeily	Farah Shaer; Nadim Abou Samra; Samira Sarkis; Jenny Gebara; Laeticia Semaan; Jean Paul Hage; Hussein Hijazi; Wissam Botrous; Ghassan Chemali	Drama	2018	Lucien Bourjeily		Winner of the Special Jury Prize Award - 2017 Dubai International Film Festival
2018	Morine			Tony Farjallah	Carmen Bsaibes; Mounir Maasri; Hasan Farhat; Ghassan Massoud; Takla Chamoun	Drama	March 22	Tony Farjallah	Drama
2018	The Insult		Ziad Doueiri	Feature	Drama	2018	Rachid Bouchareb, Jean Bréhat; Julie Gayet; Antoun Sehnaoui; Nadia Turincev	Ezekiel Films; Tessalit Productions; Rouge International	
2018	Prisoner	Arabic: "سجين"	Ahmad Tahan	Aida Sabra, Saad Kaderi, Tony Kanaan	Ahmad Tahan	Short, Drama, Thriller	2018		17 mins
2019	1982	French: Liban 1982	Oualid Mouaness	Nadine Labaki; Rodrigue Sleiman; Mohamad Dalli	Oualid Mouaness	Drama	2019	Tricycle Logic; Abbout Productions	1h 40m
2019	All the Victory	French: Le prix de la victoire	Ahmad Ghossein	Flavia Bechara; Adel Chahine; Elie Choufani; Issam Bou Khaled	Ahmad Ghossein	Drama	2019	Abbout Productions	1h 33m
2019	"Clustifer"		Karim Araman	Nadim Khouri; Rita Ibrahim; Rawad Kansoun	Karim Araman	Short	September 28		15 mins

== 2020s ==
Year	Title	Other Titles	Director	Cast	Writer	Genre	Release	Production	Length
2020	Only the Winds	Arabic: فقط الرياح	Karim Kassem	Lyne Ramadan; Fouad Mahouly; Zeinab Hind Khadra	Karim Kassem	Docufiction	2020	Screen Productions	131 mins
2020	We Are From There	Arabic: نحن من هناك	Wissam Tanios	Milad Khawam; Jamil Khawa	Wissam Tanios	Documentary	2020	Abbout Production	82 mins
2021	Broken Keys	Arabic: مفاتيح مكسرة; French: Le Dernier Piano	Jimmy Keyrouz	Tarek Yaacoub; Rola Beksmati	Jimmy Keyrouz; Ellie Foumbi; Moe Lattouf	Drama	2021	Ezekiel Film Production; Ginger Beirut Production	1h 40m
2021	Miguel's War	Arabic: حرب ميغيل; French: La Guerre de Miguel	Eliane Raheb	Michel (Miguel) Jleilaty	Eliane Raheb	Documentary	2021	Itar Productions	2h 8m
2021	Confusion & Jealousy	Arabic: حيرة وغيرة	Isaac Belot	Yara elle Khawam; Elie Kadamani; Ihab el Siblani; Stephanie Ghafary	Ihab el Siblani; Ziad Flouty	Romantic; Comedy	2021	Lebanese Filmmakers Assoc. Ihab el Siblani	88 mins
2021	Octopus	Arabic: أخطبوط	Karim Kassem	Fouad Mahouly	Karim Kassem	Short; Docufiction	2021	Screen Productions	64 mins
2022	After the End of the World	Arabic: ما بعد النهاية	Nadim Mishlawi		Nadim Mishlawi; Antoine Waked	Documentary	2022	Abbout Productions	1h 12 mins
2022	All Roads Lead to Rome	Arabic: ع مفرق طريق	Lara Saba	Betty Taoutel; Cynthya Karam; Julia Kassar	Josephine Habchi	Drama; Comedy	2022	Cedars Art Production	89 mins
2022	Batata	Arabic: بطاطا	Noura Kevorkian		Noura Kevorkian	Documentary	2022	Musa Dagh Production	2h 5m
2022	Dirty Difficult Dangerous	Arabic: جديد نحاس بطاريات	Wissam Charaf	Clara Couturet; Ziad Jallad; Rifaat Tarabay	Wissam Charaf; Hala Dabaji; Mariette Désert	Drama	2022	Aurora Films	1h 23m
2022	Farah	Arabic:فرح	Kenton Oxley; Hassiba Freiha	Stephanie Atala; Pierrette Katrib; Josyane Boulos	Hassiba Freiha	Thriller	2022	Knockout Productions	1h 59m
2022	Perfect Strangers	Arabic: أصحاب ولا أعزّ French: Parfaits inconnus	Wissam Smayra	Mona Zaki; Nadine Labaki; Adel Karam; Georges Khabbaz; Diamand Bou Abboud	Wissam Smayra; Gabriel Yammine	Drama	2022	Netflix	1h 39m
2022	"Warsha"	Arabic: ورشة; French: "Warcha"	Dania Bdeir	Khansa; Hassan Aqqoulm; Kamal Saleh	Dania Bdeir	Short	2022		15mins
2022	"The Sun Sets on Beirut"	Arabic: غروب بيروت	Daniela Stephan	Marilyne Naaman; Pio Shihan; Jo McGarry	Daniela Stephan	Short	2022		17mins
2023	Dancing on the Edge of a Volcano	Arabic: رقصٌ على حافة البركان	Cyril Ariss	Mounia Akl; Saleh Bakri; Nadia Charbel	Cyril Aris	Documentary	2023	Abbout Productions	1h 27m
2023	The Lebanese Burger Mafia	Arabic: مافيا البرجر اللبناني	Omar Mouallem	Rudy Kemaldean; Saleh Kemaldean; Anna Lund	Omar Mouallem	Documentary	2023	Back Road Productions	1h 39m
2023	Mother Valley	Arabic: أرض الوهم; French: La nuit du verre	Carlos Chahine	Marilyne Naaman; Antoine Merheb Tarb; Nathalie Baye	Tristan Benoît; Carlos Chahine	Drama	2023	Autres Rivages	1h 23m
2023	Q	Arabic: قاف	Jude Chehab	Ziad Chehab; Hiba Khodr; Doria Mouneimne	Jude Chehab	Documentary	2023		1h 31m
2023	Thiiird	Arabic: الثالث	Karim Kassem	Fouad Mahouly; Mohamad Alayan	Nadia Hassan; Karim Kassem	Docufiction	2023	Screen Productions	1h 34m
2023	Tnaash	Arabic: تناعش	Boudy Sfeir	Mohamad Assaf; Tony Dagher; Patrick Chemali	Azdachir Jalal Ahmad; Patrick Chemali; Boudy Sfeir	Drama	2023	Phi Productions	1h 34m
2023	Valley of Exile	Arabic: وادي المنفى	Anna Fahr	Maria Hassan; Hala Hosni; Michel Hourani	Anna Fahr	Drama	2023	Morning Bird Pictures; Placeless Films	1h 46m
2024	Arzé	Arabic: أرزة French: Arzé; Korean: 아르제; Mandarin: 阿尔泽	Mira Shaib	Diamand Abou Abboud; Betty Taoutel; Bilal Al Hamwi; Elie Mitri; Fadi Abi Samra; Fouad Yammine; Junaid Zeineldine	Louay Khraish; Faissal Sam Shaib	Drama; Comedy	2024	Spotless Mind Films	1h 33m
2024	Diaries From Lebanon	Arabic: مثل قصص الحب; French: Journal du Liban	Myriam El-Hajj	Joumana Haddad; Georges Moufarrej; Perla Joe Maalouli	Myriam El-Hajj	Documentary	2024	Abbout Productions	1h 40m
2024	The Farm	Arabic: المزرعة	Nadim Mehanna	Roula Chamieh; Aleco Daoud; Abdelhay Al Farhat	Rami Awad; Anthony Hamawi; Fouad Yammine	Documentary	2024	NMPRO	1h 44m
2024	Green Line	Arabic: الخط الأخضر	Sylvie Ballyot		Sylvie Ballyot; Fida Bizri	Documentary	2024	Films de Force Majeure; TS Productions; Xbo Films	2h 30m
2024	We Never Left	Arabic: رحنا وما رحنا	Loulwa Khoury		Loulwa Khoury	Documentary	2024		1h 23m
2025	BornStars	Arabic: فيلم بورنو	Caroline Labaki	Yasmine Al Massri; Salma Chalabi	Tony Eli; Caroline Labaki	Comedy	2025		1h 30m
2025	A Sad and Beautiful World	Arabic: نجوم الأمل والألم	Cyril Aris	Julia Kassar; Mounia Akl; Hassan Akil; Sandy Chamoun	Cyril Aris; Bane Fakih	Drama	2025	Abbout Productions	1h 32m
2025	Dead Dog	Arabic: كما في السماء كذلك على الأرض	Sarah Francis	Chirine Karameh; Nida Wakim	Sarah Francis	Drama	2025	Mad Solutions	1h 32m
2025	Do You Love Me	Arabic:	Lana Daher		Lana Daher	Documentary	2025		1h 15m
2026	The Day of Wrath: Tales from Tripoli		Rania Rafei		Rania Rafei	Documentary	2026		2h
2026	Furies		Rami Kodeih	Maria Nakouzi	Rami Kodeih	Drama	2026		1h 33m
2026	In the Darkness I See You		Nadim Tabet	Tima Ahmad; Samer Alsammam; Tarek Bachacha	Nadim Tabet; Antoine Waked; Jamal Belmahi	Supernatural Thriller	2026	Abbout Productions	1h 25m
2026	Never Stop		Samer Abouhamad		Samer Abouhamad	Documentary	2025		1h 15m
2026	"Someday, a Child"	Arabic: يوماً ما ولد	Marie-Rose Ostas	Antoine Daher; Khalid Hassan; Tarek Esper	Marie-Rose Ostas	Drama Short	2025		27m
2026	"The Sentinel"	French:La sentinelle	Ali Cherri	Éric Cantona; Nahuel Pérez Biscayart; Georges Torbey	Ali Cherri	Short Drama	2026		29m
2026	Yesterday the Eye Didn't Sleep	Arabic: البارح العين ما نامت	Rakan Mayasi	Rim Al Mawla; Pôl Seif; Jawaher Al Mawla; Yasser Al Mawla; Salma Chalabi	Rakan Mayasi	Drama	2026		1h 40m

== See also ==
- Cinema of Lebanon
- List of Lebanese Television Series
- List of Lebanese submissions for the Academy Award for Best Foreign Language Film
