= List of Lebanese submissions for the Academy Award for Best International Feature Film =

Best International Feature Film submissions from Lebanon

Highlights
- Debut: 1978
- Submissions: 22
- Nominations: 2
- Oscar winners: none

Lebanon has submitted films for the Academy Award for Best International Feature Film (Note: The category was previously named the Academy Award for Best Foreign Language Film, but this was changed to the Academy Award for Best International Feature Film in April 2019, after the Academy deemed the word "Foreign" to be outdated.) since 1978. The award is handed out annually by the United States Academy of Motion Picture Arts and Sciences to a feature-length motion picture produced outside the United States that contains primarily non-English dialogue.

As of 2026, Lebanon has been nominated twice, for The Insult (2017) and Capernaum (2018).

== Submissions ==
The Academy of Motion Picture Arts and Sciences has invited the film industries of various countries to submit their best film for the Academy Award for Best International Feature Film since 1956. The International Feature Film Committee oversees the process and reviews all the submitted films. Following this, they vote via secret ballot to determine the five nominees for the award.

Lebanon's submitted a film for the first time in 1978, with Promise of Love, a US co-production in the Armenian language. Twenty years later, Lebanon began submitting regularly Arabic language films, many of which also featured French dialogue.

Its first nomination, The Insult (2017), was directed by Ziad Doueiri, and follows the country's never-ending sectarian conflict. The country was nominated again in the following year, for Capernaum (2018) directed by Nadine Labaki, which follows a young boy in the slums of Beirut.

Below is a list of the films that have been submitted by Lebanon for review by the academy for the award by year and the respective Academy Awards ceremony.

| Year (Ceremony) | Film title used in nomination | Original Title | Director | Result |
|---|---|---|---|---|
| 1978 (51st) | Promise of Love | وعد الحب | Sarky Mouradian | Not nominated |
| 1998 (71st) | West Beirut | بيروت الغربية | Ziad Doueiri | Not nominated |
| 1999 (72nd) | Around the Pink House | البيت الزهري | Joana Hadjithomas and Khalil Joreige | Not nominated |
| 2002 (75th) | When Maryam Spoke Out | لمّا حكيت مريم | Assad Fouladkar | Not nominated |
| 2003 (76th) | The Kite | طيّارة من ورق | Randa Chahal Sabag | Not nominated |
| 2006 (79th) | Bosta | بوسطة | Philippe Aractingi | Not nominated |
| 2007 (80th) | Caramel | سكر بنات | Nadine Labaki | Not nominated |
| 2008 (81st) | Under the Bombs | تحت القصف | Philippe Aractingi | Not nominated |
| 2011 (84th) | Where Do We Go Now? | و هلّق لوين | Nadine Labaki | Not nominated |
| 2013 (86th) | Blind Intersections | قصة ثواني | Lara Saba | Not nominated |
| 2014 (87th) | Ghadi | غدي | Amin Dora | Not nominated |
| 2015 (88th) | Void | وينن | Tarek Korkomaz, Zeina Makki, Jad Beyrouthy, Christelle Ighniades, Salim Habr, Maria Abdel Karim and Naji Bechara | Not nominated |
| 2016 (89th) | Very Big Shot | فيلم كتير كبير | Mir-Jean Bou Chaaya | Not nominated |
| 2017 (90th) | The Insult | قضية رقم ٢٣ | Ziad Doueiri | Nominated |
| 2018 (91st) | Capernaum | کفرناحوم | Nadine Labaki | Nominated |
| 2019 (92nd) | 1982 | | Oualid Mouaness | Not nominated |
| 2020 (93rd) | Broken Keys | مفاتيح مكسرة | Jimmy Keyrouz | Not nominated |
| 2021 (94th) | Costa Brava, Lebanon | كوستابرافا | Mounia Akl | Not nominated |
| 2022 (95th) | Memory Box | دفاتر مايا | Joana Hadjithomas and Khalil Joreige | Not nominated |
| 2024 (97th) | Arzé | أرزة | Mira Shaib | Not nominated |
| 2025 (98th) | A Sad and Beautiful World | نجوم الأمل و الألم | Cyril Aris | Not nominated |
| 2026 (99th) | Furies | غضب | Rami Kodeih | Pending |

== See also ==
- List of Academy Award winners and nominees for Best International Feature Film
- List of Academy Award-winning foreign language films
