= Setrak Sarkissian =

Lebanese tabla player

Setrak Sarkissian ستراك سركسيان
- Born: Setrak Sarkissian; 1936; Beirut, Lebanon
- Origin: Lebanese
- Died: 2017 (aged 80–81) Beirut, Lebanon
- Genres: tablah player
- Years active: 1958–2016

Setrak Sarkissian ستراك سركسيان (1936 – 21 February 2017) was a Lebanese tablah player of Armenian descent. He has won numerous awards in the Middle East and in Europe for his contributions to both traditional and modern Arabic music. His compositions and arrangements have been featured on over 30 recordings and movie soundtracks, including five with Farid al-Atrash.

== Biography ==
Sarkissian was born in Beirut, Lebanon. His passion for music began early; inspired by his older brother's tabla playing at home and at family parties by 18 was learning to play himself. His family was not always supportive, since at that time music as a profession did not have a high social status, they even broke his drum. Not to be deterred, he continued to play and enrolled at the conservatory for further training. His skill was immediately recognized, and Sarkissian excelled rapidly.

Sarkissian began touring with the dancer Nadia Gamal in 1958, performing with her until 1962, when he began playing with Samira Toufik. Sarkissian has performed with many Middle Eastern singers, including Samira Toufik, Fairuz, Mouhamed Abdel Wahab, Farid El Atrash, Sabah Fakhri, Abdel Halim Hafez, Fayza Ahmed, Warda, Sabah, and Majida Roumi. He has performed with such dancers as Nadia Gamal, Tahiya Carioka, Samia Gamal, Fifi Abdou, Nagwa Fouad, Souher Zaki, Samara, Amani, Ranine, Noura, and Shahraman. He continued to perform, record and teach. He lived in the traditionally Armenian neighborhood of Bourj Hammoud and taught workshops around the world, along with international performances. Setrak has recorded over 20 albums of belly dance and traditional middle eastern music, most of which with the Hollywood Music Center label.

Setrak Sarkissian died on 21 February 2017 in Beirut, Lebanon.

== See also ==
- Rony Barrak
- Toufic Farroukh
- Ziad El Rahbani
