= Falling from Earth =

Falling from earth -و على الأرض السماﺀ
- Movie Poster
- Directed by: Chadi Zeneddine
- Written by: Chadi Zeneddine
- Produced by: Artwist Productions; Néon Productions
- Starring: Rafik Ali Ahmad; Carmen Lebbos; Ammar Shalak; Naya Salame; Yamen Sukkarieh; Nicole Kamato; Imad Creidi
- Cinematography: Johnny Abi-Fares
- Release date: December 2007 (Dubai)
- Running time: 70 minutes
- Country: Lebanon
- Language: Arabic

Falling From Earth (Arabic: و على الأرض السماﺀ - wa-ala el ard el sama'a) is a 2007 Lebanese film written, produced and directed by Chadi Zeneddine. The film premiered on December 13, 2007, at the Dubai International Film Festival. It was running for the Muhr award
Falling From Earth is Zeneddine's first feature film.

== Synopsis ==
Set within a damaged building, the story centers on Youssef and his collection of photographs depicting happy individuals. The narrative explores the juxtaposition between these images and the reality of a city scarred by time and war, specifically focusing on the atmosphere of modern Beirut.

== Director's Statement ==
I started shooting the film 3 years ago with a crew of mostly first-timers. The film was interrupted several times and so I would continue shooting every six months for a couple of days; the financial strain was burdening.... and I was falling apart at times. The project started with the internal fear and heaviness that I had felt due to post-war trauma after I returned to Beirut. It was in no way the physical war that had affected me: I had not lived it. But I could not ignore how mute and destroyed most of us are, despite the effort we put in denying and defying it all through our survival instincts.... but I also could not ignore that I was falling deep in love with the undying city. Some time later, when ‘another’ war broke out, I did remember the SOUND of it... It was haunting me everywhere I went, just like it does to the main character of the film: it has become our shadow and greatest enemy. Through different chapters that somehow represent several key dates in the perpetual conflict(s), I watch my characters lost and voiceless turning around in circles, still searching or waiting for a ‘no way’ out... indeed a ‘no way’ out, for they are not fallen angels, they are simple humans FALLING FROM EARTH and craving to stay in Beirut, where angels are reborn...

== Cast ==
- Rafik Ali Ahmad
- Carmen Lebbos
- Ammar Shalak
- Naya Salamé
- Yamen Sukkarieh
- Nicole Kamato
- Imad Creidi
- Christine Choueiri
- Pierre Dagher
- Ziad Said
- Amal Ftouni
- Georges Arbid

== Production ==
The film original title was Waiting for ... Beirut.
