= Very Big Shot =

Lebanese black comedy film

- Film poster
- Directed by: Mir-Jean Bou Chaaya
- Written by: Mir-Jean Bou Chaaya
- Produced by: Lucien Bou Chaaya; Christian Bou Chaaya; Mir-Jean Bou Chaaya
- Starring: Alain Saadeh
- Cinematography: Fady Kassem
- Edited by: Mir-Jean Bou Chaaya; Simon el Habre
- Music by: Michel Elefteriades
- Distributed by: Netflix; Front Row Filmed Entertainment; Salim Ramia & Co.
- Release dates: 11 September 2015 (TIFF); 19 November 2015 (Lebanon)
- Running time: 107 minutes
- Country: Lebanon
- Language: Lebanese Arabic

Very Big Shot is a 2015 Lebanese black comedy film directed by Mir-Jean Bou Chaaya. It was screened in the Discovery section of the 2015 Toronto International Film Festival. The original soundtrack was composed, arranged and produced by Michel Elefteriades. It was selected as the Lebanese entry for the Best Foreign Language Film at the 89th Academy Awards but it was not nominated.

== Cast ==
- Alain Saadeh as Ziad Haddad
- Wissam Fares as Jad Haddad
- Fouad Yammine as Charbel
- Tarek Yaacoub as Joe Haddad
- Alexandra Kahwaji as Alya
- Marcel Ghanem as Marcel Ghanem
- Georges Nasser as Georges Nasser

== Plot ==
Brothers Ziad (Alain Saadeh) and Joe (Tarek Yaacoub) run a small but lucrative drug-dealing business out of their takeout pizzeria in one of Beirut’s working-class districts. With their youngest brother Jad (Wissam Fares) about to be released from prison – where he was serving a sentence for a crime that Ziad had committed – Ziad and Joe plan to go straight by using their coke-peddling profits to open a restaurant. But Ziad's supplier, a powerful drug lord who is none too keen to see his dealers retire, convince the brothers to take on one last job: smuggling a million-dollar shipment of Captagon - a locally manufactured amphetamine - to Syria, where the drug is wildly popular with militia fighters.

Smelling a trap, Ziad and Jad hatch a plan to divert the shipment to Erbil in Iraqi Kurdistan, where they have a secure connection. By chance, they learn that cans of exposed film reels are spared the obligatory X-ray at the Beirut airport, as the radiation can damage the footage. Overnight, the three brothers become the producers of a feature film directed by Charbel (Fouad Yammine), a talentless filmmaker and frequent customer whose tab at the pizzeria has vastly exceeded his means. As the shipping date approaches, the boys race to finalize the details of their very big plan while warding off the suspicions of their vengeful boss.

== See also ==
- List of submissions to the 89th Academy Awards for Best Foreign Language Film
- List of Lebanese submissions for the Academy Award for Best Foreign Language Film
