= Ferial Karim =

Lebanese musician and actor

- فريال كريم
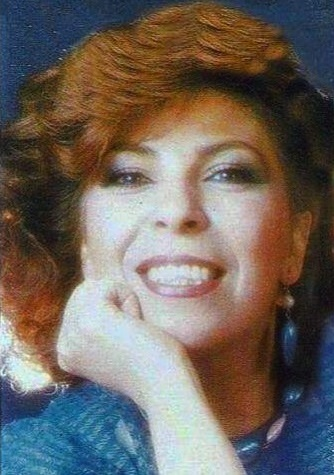
- A portrait of Ferial Karim
- Born: Vera Semaan; April 16, 1938
- Died: July 4, 1988 (aged 50); Beirut, Lebanon
- Occupations: Comedian, actress, singer, monologist, stand-up comedian
- Spouse: Mohammad Karim
- Children: Mona Karim

Ferial Karim (Arabic: فريال كريم, romanized: Faryāl Karīm; 16 April 1938 – 4 July 1988) was a Lebanese actress and singer. Ferial was introduced to show business at a very young age by her father, she garnered popular acclaim and traveled back to Lebanon where she continued performing until she died on stage at the age of fifty.

== Early life ==
Ferial Karim was born Vera Semaan to a Christian family on April 16, 1938, to Bechara, a postal office clerk and Marie, a housewife. Karim had five siblings, four girls and a brother; she received preferential treatment from her parents ever since she was diagnosed with rheumatic heart disease; she enjoyed and got away with mimicking her parents' guests and her teachers.

Karim's maternal cousin Alexandra Badran was an actress and singer who was known as Nour al-Hoda. Alexandra encouraged Karim's father Bechara to pursue a singing career for his eldest daughter Isabelle in Egypt. Bechara took both his daughters with him where the ten-year-old Karim took on the stage while a band was practicing and began singing Thuraya Helmi songs. Karim attracted attention of Egyptian movie producers and was cast as a child prodigy Ferial in Ibrahim Lama's movie Sikkat as-Salamah (The safety track); Karim adopted the nickname for her artistic career.

== Marriage ==
Karim's acting career in Cairo's Farouq theater introduced her to a Lebanese singer Mohammad Karim. In 1954, the sixteen-year-old Karim married Mohammad who was many years her senior. Mohammad quit his singing career and dedicated his life to promote Karim's talent. The couple had two children, Mona and Samir.

== Career ==
Karim and Mohammad moved to Damascus where she performed on stage for seven years before returning to Beirut where her sister Isabelle who was working in the national radio introduced her screenwriter Mohammad Chamel with whom she would have a long lasting artistic cooperation beginning with Ya mudir on the radio and ending with el-dunia heik on Lebanese national television.

== Death ==
Karim died of heart failure while performing on stage on July 4, 1988, and was buried in Saint Elias Btina church in Beirut two days later.

== Filmography ==
Film and television
Year	Title	Role	Notes
196?	Kawakeb	Sabah's maid	
1962	Abu Salim el Tabel	Um Nasra	TV series
1964	'itab		
1965	Layali el Sharq		
1966	Sultana		
1967	Ya Saber Ayoub	Sett Safi	TV series
1967	Lahib al jasad		
1967	Msahar Ramadan		TV series
1967	Karm el hawa		
1968	Funduq al ahlam	Leila	
1968	Siyaret el Jamiyyeh		TV series
1969	Mokhtar el sabeh bahrat	Um Sayyah	TV series
1969	Shareh el ezz	Yasmin	TV series
1971	Alam al shohra		
1972	Junun al morahiqat		
1973	Misk w ambar		
1975	Bye bye ya helwa		
1975	Helwa ktir		Play
1975	Ustath Ayyoub	Umm Ayyoub	
1976	El-dunia heik	Zmorrod	TV series
1983	Ayyouq w rifqato	Nabiha	TV series
1986	Ibrahim effendi	Nadia	TV series
