= Hostage of Time =

1994 Lebanese film

- Directed by: Jean K. Chamoun
- Release date: 1994

Hostage of Time is a film from Lebanon by Jean K. Chamoun (1994, 50 min).

The narrative focuses on the experiences of a young female doctor who returns to her village in south Lebanon to find the area affected by an Israeli assault which destroyed 50 villages and displaced half a million people.

Following her work with the women and children of the surrounding villages, the film charts the hopes and dreams of the people of Southern Lebanon and their efforts to rebuild their lives.

According to Hady Zaccaq, "the film portrays this society of resistance through various lenses: military action, steadfastness, and attachment to the land, extending to the doctor’s role in education, mentoring female students, and discussing topics related to sexuality."

== Awards ==
- Silver Award — Festival International de Programmes Audiovisuels, France
- Award of Union of Doc Filmmakers — Ismailia Festival, Egypt
