= Hisham Bizri =

American filmmaker

- Born: Beirut, Lebanon
- Education: Boston, Harvard, New York & Chicago universities
- Occupations: Film Director, Writer, & Producer
- Awards: Bogliasco Fellowship, 2019; Andrei Tarkovsky Prize, 2017; Rome Prize, 2008; Guggenheim Fellowship, 2007.

Hisham Bizri is a Lebanese-born American filmmaker. Bizri served as an assistant director to Raúl Ruiz in the US and to Miklós Jancsó in Hungary. Over the course of his career, he has written, directed, edited, and produced 29 short films and one dramatic feature. Additionally, he has written both original screenplays and adaptations of novels, short stories, and plays. His industry experience includes work as Producer at Future TV, Creative Director at Orbit Communications Company, and President & Creative Director of Levantine Films. He was a Professor of Film Directing and Screenwriting at Brown University, the University of Minnesota, MIT, and UC Davis, and taught as Visiting Professor at NYU, Boston University, School of the Museum of Fine Arts, and in Lebanon, Korea, Japan, France, Ireland, and Jordan. His students went on to study film at NYU, USC, AFI, UCLA, La Fémis and FAMU.

== Film career ==
Bizri's films showed in international venues including Sundance, Cannes (short film corner), Berlin, Oberhausen, Moscow, Tribeca, Los Angeles, Valencia, Beirut, and Abu Dhabi film festivals as well as the Louvre, Institut du Monde Arabe, Cinémathèque Française, Centre Pompidou, MoMa, Reina Sofia and Anthology Film Archives. He received awards from the McKnight, LEF, Jerome, and Rockefeller Foundations, as well as fellowships from the Guggenheim Foundation, Bogliasco Center, and American Academy in Rome, which awarded him the "Rome Prize" (FAAR 2009). In 2017, Bizri received the Andrei Tarkovsky film award for best director.

=== Selected film ===
Year	Title	Length	Platforms
2023	Elektra	89 minutes	Netflix & Apple TV

== Awards and honors ==
- Bogliasco Center Fellowship (2019)
- Best Director (Tarkovsky Award) for "Night Shift," Amarcord Arthouse Film & Video Festival (2017)
- Best Editing Award for "Beneath the wide, wide, Heaven," RAIIFA International Film Festival (2016)
- Salomon Faculty Research Award, Brown University (2015)
- Script Station, Berlinale Talent Campus, Berlin International Film Festival (2011)
- American Academy in Rome "Rome Prize" (2008)
- McKnight Media Artist Award (2008)
- Guggenheim Fellowship (2007)
- Rockefeller Foundation Bellagio Fellowship (2005)
