= Toni Maalouf =

Lebanese actor

- طوني معلوف
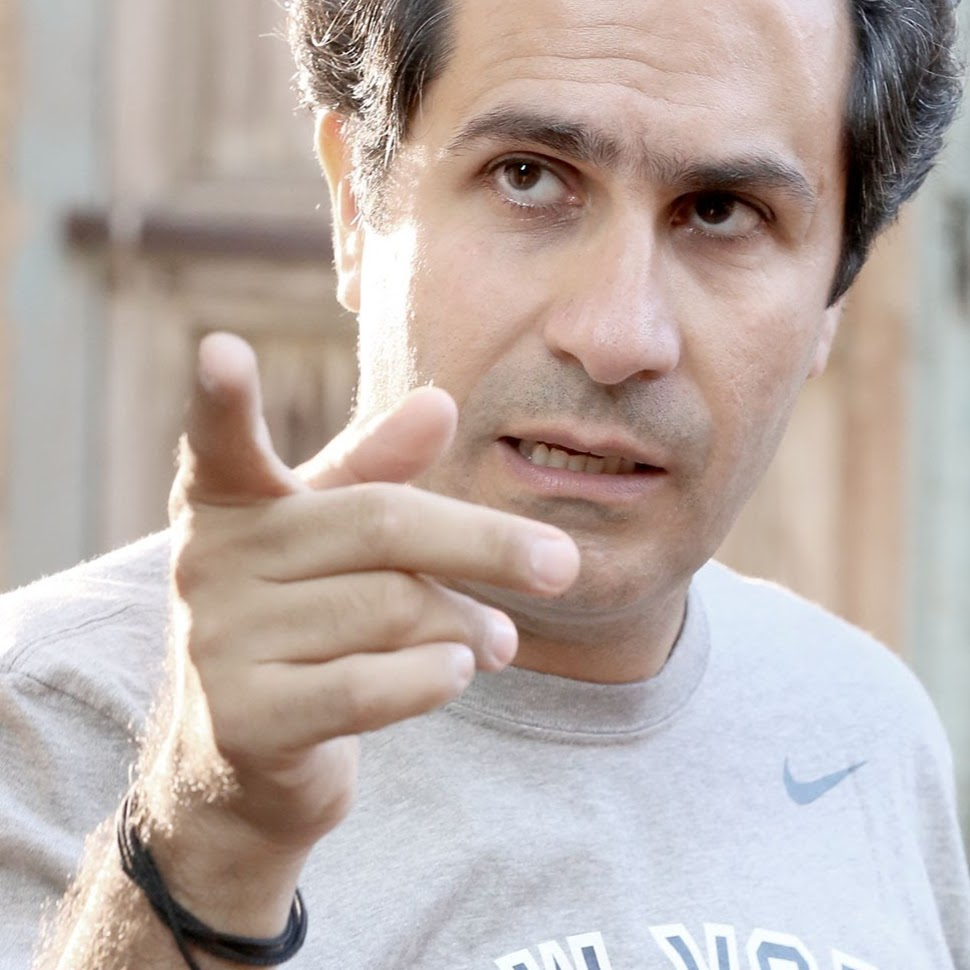
- Occupations: Actor, Director, Media and Communications Professional

Toni Maalouf (Arabic: طوني معلوف) is a Lebanese actor.

== Filmography ==
=== Film ===
- Eddis Kfeefan - Father Hardini. 1998
- Charbel: The Movie - Father Hardini. 2009
- Rafka - Father Hardini
- In the Shadow of the City - طيف المدينة - Nadim. 2000
- House of Saddam - HBO-BBC Mini Series - Ahmad. 2008

=== Television ===
- Hotel Al Afrah. 2012
- Familia - Tarek
- Hikayat Amal. - Habib. 2001
- Fares el Ahlam - Imad
- Attaer el Maksour - Ihab
- Iza el Ard Mdawwara
- Ismouha La
- Malih ya Baher
- Al Shahroura - Romio Lahoud

=== Theater ===
- Hake Rjeil

=== Dubbing roles ===
- Brother Bear - Tuck (Egyptian dialect version)
- Brother Bear 2 - Tuck (Egyptian dialect version)
- Kung Fu Panda - Po
- M.I. High - Kenneth Armstrong Flatley (one of his voices)
- Madagascar - Alex
- Teletubbies - Narrator
