= Baalbeck Studios =

Lebanese movie production company

Baalbeck Studios was a movie-producing company in Lebanon. The company was founded in 1962 by Palestinian businessman Badie Bulos and started operating on 2 January 1963 in the same premises in which the Lebanese Recording Company (LRC) had started operating in 1957. In the 1960s, it became one of the most prominent movie studios of the Arab world. The offices of the company were located in the Beirut suburb Sin al-Fil.

The peak years of Baalbeck Studios were 1965–1974. By 1971 Intra increased its share of ownership in Baalbeck Studios to 82%. During the Lebanese Civil War production of movies by Baalbeck Studios was sporadic. The studios were repeatedly looted during the war years.

Baalbeck Studios was revived after the war. However, it closed down for good in 1994. In 2010, as the former building of the company was about to be demolished, material from Baalbeck Studios were donated to UMAM Documentation and Research.

== Bibliography ==
- "Studios Baalbeck veut dérouler ses bobines". L'Orient-Le Jour (in French). 2024-05-29.
- "Going public with Baalbeck Studios". L'Orient Today. 2024-04-24.
- Hourany, Dana (2024-05-03). "Saving Baalbeck Studios and Restoring History". Nowlebanon.
- "Indexes of Dust: Cinematic Archives in Egypt and Lebanon – qumra journal". qumra.ca.
