= Insan Hayawan Chay =

- Directed by: Abdallah Sfeir
- Written by: ِAbdallah Sfeir
- Produced by: 3DLEBANON
- Starring: Issam Al Achkar; Khitam Laham; Julian Farhat; Tarek Yaakoub; Nader Dernaika; Hadia Khoury; Michel Khabbaz; Mahdi Zaiter; Aida Wahbi
- Cinematography: Abdallah Sfeir
- Release date: January 16, 2014
- Running time: 93 minutes
- Country: Lebanon
- Language: Arabic

Insan Hayawan Chay (انسان, حيوان, شيء) is a 2014 Lebanese psychological thriller film written and directed by ِAbdallah Sfeir. It was released on January 16, 2014.

== Plot ==
Three students, Ramzi, Sam, and Sahar sent by their psychology teacher Nour to a Lebanese village Ain AL Jen to investigate a series of supernatural activities including Khalil, a man pretending that he can perform miracles, Em Imad, a mother who has lost her son but still sees him, a house haunted by Jen, and a pregnant woman possessed by the Demon Child Killer called Al KRINEH. Faced by their own fears and dark secrets, will they be able to solve the mystery and return to their normal lives?

== Cast ==
- Issam Al Achkar (Khalil)
- Khitam Laham (Em Imad)
- Julian Farhat (Nour)
- Tarek Yaakoub (Ramzi)
- Nader Dernaika (Sam)
- Hadia Khoury (Sahar)
- Michel Khabbaz (Mokhtar)
- Mahdi Zaiter (Gravekeeper)
- Aida Wahbi
