= Every Day Is a Holiday (film) =

- Poster by Cinefondation
- Directed by: Dima El-Horr
- Written by: Dima El-Horr; Rabih Mroué
- Produced by: Thierry Lenouvel; Nicole Gerhards; Sabine Sidawi-Hamdan; Hanneke M. van der Tas
- Starring: Hiam Abbas; Manal Khader; Raïa Haidar
- Cinematography: Dominique Gentil
- Music by: Pierre Aviat
- Release dates: September 15, 2009 (TIFF); January 27, 2010 (France)
- Running time: 90 minutes
- Countries: France; Lebanon
- Languages: Arabic; French

Every Day is a Holiday (French: Chaque jour est une fête; Arabic: كل يوم عيد) is a 2009 film by the Lebanese director Dima El-Horr. The film is on the official selection of 2009 Toronto International Film Festival. It is the first feature film by Dima El-Horr.

== Plot ==
Three women, of different backgrounds, are on their way to prison to pay a visit to their men on Independence Day. As the story progresses, this journey becomes a quest for their own independence.

== Cast ==
- Hiam Abbas
- Manal Khader as Lina
- Raïa Haidar as Tamara

== Reception ==
Dennis Harvey of Variety wrote, "A busload of stranded women wander a stark no-man's-land in Dima El-Horr's feature debut."
