= Liliane Nemri =

Lebanese actress

- Born: 1960 (age 65–66); Lebanon
- Occupation: Actress
- Years active: 1971–present

Liliane Nemri (Arabic: ليليان نمري) is a Lebanese actress and comedian who has acted in Lebanese movies and series.

== Filmography ==
Movie name
Liman Youghanni Alhob (For Those Who Sing Love) (1986)
West Beirut (1998)
Civilize (Randa Shahal's movie) (2001)
Tayyara Men Warak (Paper Plane) (2004)
Bosta (2006)

== TV series ==
- Abou Melhem
- Al 3a2ila al sa3ida
- Al Mo3allima wal Ostaz
- Sett El habayeb Ya Baba
- Bentein w Sabi
- Es7a Ya neyem
- A7la 3alam
- Shou bado ysir
- Oul Nchalla
- Kella Mel7a
- Ghadan Yawmon Akhar
- Imra2a men daya3
- Erbet Ten7al
- Jamil w Jamile
- Kallemni Arabi
- Abou el 3abed
- Ma2lab Mrattab
- 3ammi Kou
- She22a fo2 She22a
- Alkhadaj
- Abdo w abdo
- Se3a bel ize3a
- Mech zabta
- Jamil and Jamileh (2001)
- Ahdam chi (2010)
