= Furies (2026 film) =

2026 drama film by Rami Kodeih

- International promotional poster
- Directed by: Rami Kodeih
- Written by: Rami Kodeih; Nora Mariana
- Produced by: Rodrigo Teixeira; Rami Kodeih; Nora Mariana
- Starring: Maria Nakouzi; Rym Mroue; Hasan Akil; Issam Bou Khaled
- Cinematography: Tony Kopec
- Production companies: RT Features; Nausika Films; Smokehouse Pictures
- Release date: 4 September 2026 (Venice)
- Running time: 133 minutes
- Countries: Lebanon; Brazil
- Language: Arabic

Furies is a 2026 drama film directed by Rami Kodeih, in his directorial debut, and co-written with Nora Mariana. A co-production of Lebanon and Brazil, it stars Maria Nakouzi, Rym Mroue, Hasan Akil and Issam Bou Khaled. George Clooney and Grant Heslov serve as Executive Producers.

The film had its world premiere in the Official Venice Spotlight section of the 83rd Venice International Film Festival on September 4, 2026. It was also selected as the Lebanese entry for the Best International Feature Film at the 99th Academy Awards.

== Plot ==
Set during the Lebanese liquidity crisis, when banks froze millions of depositors out of their own life savings, two women scheme an all-night heist to get their own money back and pay for a life-saving surgery.

== Cast ==
- Maria Nakouzi as Dalia
- Rym Mroue as Maro
- Hasan Akil as Hamza
- Issam Bou Khaled as Sunshine

== Production ==
In May 2025, it was announced Rami Kodeih would direct the film, then titled Wolves, with Rodrigo Teixeira set to produce under his RT Features banner. Principal photography commenced that same month in Lebanon. George Clooney serves as an executive producer under his Smokehouse Pictures banner.

== Release ==

It had its world premiere in the Venice Spotlight section of the 83rd Venice International Film Festival on 4 September 2026. It also screened at the 2026 Toronto International Film Festival in the Centrepiece section and the 2026 BFI London Film Festival.

== Reception ==
On the review aggregator website Rotten Tomatoes, 100% of 10 critics' reviews are positive. Metacritic, which uses a weighted average, assigned the film a score of 80 out of 100, based on 5 critics, indicating favorable reviews.

== See also ==
- List of submissions to the 99th Academy Awards for Best International Feature Film
- List of Lebanese submissions for the Academy Award for Best International Feature Film
