= Anjo Rihane =

Lebanese actress

- آنجو ريحان
- Born: Anjo Rihane; 01/01/1978; Lebanon
- Occupation: Actress
- Years active: 2000–present

Anjo Rihane (Arabic: آنجو ريحان) is a Lebanese actress. As a young student, she became involved and active in several Lebanese human rights organizations.

== Education and work ==
At age 18, Rihane moved to Beirut, where she attended the pedagogic school and graduated in visual arts. Rihane became a drama and visual arts teacher in 2000. She later decided to attempt to become an actress.

Rihane studied and graduated in drama and theater from the Lebanese University. During her time as a student, she assisted with several seminars and workshops related to drama and theater.

In 2005, Rihane became a professional actress. She played many roles in several Lebanese drama series, including "Khadimat el Kasser," Samir Hachi's "Majnoun Leila," Ahmad Shafik's "Shahroura," Samer Birkawi's "Cello" and "Shababik," Samer Birkawi's "Gazel Elk Banet," Amer Fahed's "Jeeran," Elie Habib's "Enti Meen," and Bassem Salka's “El-Ameed." She also acted in several Lebanese and Arabic feature films, including “Where Do We Go Now?” by Nadine Labaki, "Charbel" by Nabil Lebbos, and “Beirut Holdem” by Michel Kamoun. Rihane has also been a TV presenter in some talk-shows, such as "Kalamon" on Future TV and “Layli Layltak” on LBCI. Rihane has participated in many theater plays, including “Haki Neswan”, an adaptation of a play by Lina Khoury also entitles "Haki Neswan" (which means Women Talks).

Beginning in 2008, Rihane became well known to a general audience through her role in the comedy TV show "La Youmal" on Future TV, and through the comedy satire show “Mafi Metlo” on MTV.

In 2015, Rihane returned to theater. She played solo roles in "Esme Julia”,“Mjadara Hamra” and "Shu Mnelbos" by Yehya Jaber. It was very popular in Lebanon and other countries around the world. In 2020, Rihane was presented with a best actress award at the Lebanon national theater festival.

Rihane is preparing for new theater solo plays, and she is continuing to work on several Lebanese TV series and feature films.
