= Zozo (film) =

2005 film

- Directed by: Josef Fares
- Written by: Josef Fares
- Produced by: Anna Anthony
- Starring: Imad Creidi; Antoinette Turk; Elias Gergi; Carmen Lebbos
- Music by: Adam Nordén
- Release date: 2 September 2005 (Sweden)
- Running time: 103 minutes
- Countries: Lebanon; Sweden
- Languages: Swedish; Arabic

Zozo is a drama film which was released to cinemas in Sweden on 2 September 2005. The film was selected as the official Swedish entry for the Best Foreign Language Film at the 78th Academy Awards, but it was not nominated.

== Plot ==
Zozo tells the story of a Lebanese boy (Imad Creidi), during the civil war, who gets separated from his family and ends up in Sweden.

== Production ==
The film was directed by Swedish-Lebanese director Josef Fares. The story is mostly inspired by Fares' real life immigration to Sweden during the war.

The film was Sweden's representative for Best Foreign film at the 78th Academy Awards. It won The Nordic Council Film Prize in 2006.

== See also ==
- List of submissions to the 78th Academy Awards for Best Foreign Language Film
- List of Swedish submissions for the Academy Award for Best Foreign Language Film
