= Broken Keys =

2021 film

- Film poster
- Directed by: Jimmy Keyrouz
- Written by: Jimmy Keyrouz
- Story by: Jimmy Keyrouz
- Produced by: Antoun Sehnaoui
- Starring: Tarek Yaacoub
- Cinematography: Joe Saade
- Edited by: Yves Beloniak; Maria Malek
- Music by: Gabriel Yared
- Production companies: Ezekiel Film Production; Ginger Beirut Production
- Release dates: May 2, 2021 (Jeonju); January 6, 2022 (South Korea)
- Running time: 90 minutes
- Country: Lebanon
- Language: Lebanese Arabic
- Box office: $8,510

Broken Keys (Arabic: مفاتيح مكسرة, romanized: mafātīḥ mukasarat) is a 2021 Lebanese drama film directed by Jimmy Keyrouz. It was selected as the Lebanese entry for the Best International Feature Film at the 93rd Academy Awards, but it was not nominated. The film was scheduled to be premiered at the 2020 Cannes Film Festival, before the event was cancelled. The film premiered at the Jeonju International Film Festival in May 2021.

== Plot ==
A piano player attempts to rebuild his instrument after it is destroyed by ISIS.

== Cast ==
- Tarek Yaacoub as Karim
- Rola Beksmati as Samar
- Mounir Maasri as Abou Moussa
- Ibrahim El Kurdi as Ziad
- Julian Farhat as Abdallah
- Sara Abi Kanaan as Maya
- Badih Abou Chakra as Joseph
- Gabriel Yammine as Mounir
- Hassan Mrad as Akram
- Adel Karam as Tarek
- Fadi Abi Samra as Bassam
- Layla Kamari as Rasha
- Michel Adabachi as Ibrahim
- Said Serhan as Ahmad
- Rodrigue Sleiman as Riad

== Release ==
In South Korea, the film earned $5,708 from 27 theaters in its opening weekend.

== See also ==
- List of submissions to the 93rd Academy Awards for Best International Feature Film
- List of Lebanese submissions for the Academy Award for Best International Feature Film
