= Fahd Ballan =

Fahd Ballan فهد بلان
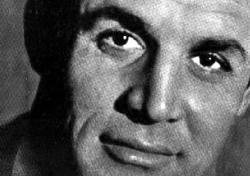

Background information
- Born: 22 March 1933; Al-Kafr, Mandatory Syria
- Origin: Suwayda, Syria
- Died: 24 December 1997 (aged 64) Al-Kafr, Syria
- Genres: Syrian folk music, Arabic music
- Occupations: Singer, actor
- Years active: 1957–1997

Fahd Ballan (Arabic: فهد بلان; 22 March 1933 – 24 December 1997) was a Syrian singer and actor, known for performing "Mountain songs" (Arabic: الأغاني الجبلية).

Fahd Ballan traveled to Egypt and worked with Farid al-Atrash. He married actress Mariam Fakhr Eddine and had an acting career. Most of his songs are performed in a Hourani dialect typical of Southern Syria and Northern Jordan. In addition to his songs in the Hourani dialect, he has also sang in the Egyptian dialect as well as in Classical Arabic.

== Early life ==
Fahd Ballan was born in 1933 in the village of Al-Kafr in As-Suwayda, Syria to a Druze family. His father, “Hamoud bin Ahmed Ballan,” farmer turned gendarme, had an affinity for music and was skilled at playing the rebab instrument, which he taught to Ballan. His parents divorced when he was around 10 years old.

In the 1950s, he sang in weddings and festivals in Suwayda.

== Beginnings in Damascus ==
He moved to Damascus in the late 1950s to work in the Syrian Radio choir. In 1958, he sang his first song Ya batal al-ahrar ("O Hero of the Free") composed by Suhail Arafa in celebration of the unification of Syria and Egypt.

In the early sixties, Ballan began a collaboration with artist Shaker Barikhan after the two met while working at Aleppo Radio. Barikhan would go on to compose for Ballan numerous songs including Aah Ya Gleby ("Oh, my heart"), a duetto with singer Sahar.

He collaborated with Syrian composer Abdel Fattah Sukkar, a collaboration which produced his most successful work, notably Washrah laha ("And Explain to Her") and Larkab Haddak Yal Motor ("I'll Ride Next to The Engine").

== See also ==
- List of Druze

== Bibliography ==
Zuhur, Sherifa (2000) Asmahan's secrets: woman, war and song, University of Texas Press
