= Berlin Beirut =

2004 film

BerlinBeirut
- Directed by: Myrna Maakaron
- Written by: Myrna Maakaron
- Produced by: Susann Schimk; Jörg Trentmann
- Starring: Maria Toma; Myrna Maakaron; Philippe Farhat; Rhoda Fromme; Richard Farhat; Sami Cheikha; Sven Philipp; Tamara Cheikha; Tatiana Smatt Cheikha; Thomas Chacra; Victor del Castillo; Zeina Bassil
- Cinematography: Jutta Tränkle
- Music by: Frank Maakaron
- Distributed by: Kurz Film Agentur Hamburg
- Release date: 10 February 2004
- Running time: 23 minutes
- Countries: Lebanon; Germany

Berlin Beirut is a 2004 German-Lebanese short film by the Lebanese director Myrna Maakaron.

== Cast and characters ==
- Maria Toma as Girl in the Subway
- Myrna Maakaron as Herself
- Philippe Farhat as Children
- Richard Farhat as Children
- Rhoda Fromme as Girl with a Flute
- Sami Cheikha as Children
- Sven Philipp as German Man
- Tamara Cheikha as Children
- Tatiana Smatt Cheikha as Women on Balcony
- Thomas Chacra as Children
- Victor del Castillo as Cellist
- Zeina Bassil as Women on Balcony

== Awards ==
- Winner of the BERLIN TODAY AWARD 2004.
- Winner of the DISCOVERY CHANNEL FILM PRIZE as BEST GERMAN DOCUMENTARY at the 47th International Leipzig Festival For Documentary And Animated Films
- Winner of the BEST DOCUMENTARY in Portugal at the FIKE 2004 - Évora International Short Film Festival
- Winner of the BEST SHORT FILM at the Carthage Film Festival 2004
- Winner of the BEST PRIZE at the Bayreuther Filmfest "kontrast 2005"
- Winner of the BEST BERLIN FILM at Achtung Berlin Film Festival 2005
- Winner of the SEDICIORO as BEST SHORT, section documentary at the "2nd Film Festival Forlì City"- Italy 2005
- Special Mention at the 7ème Biennale des cinémas arabes à Paris - 2004
- Special Mention at the International Short Film Festival Hamburg - 2004
