= Najah Salam =

Lebanese singer and actress (1931–2023)

- نجاح سلام
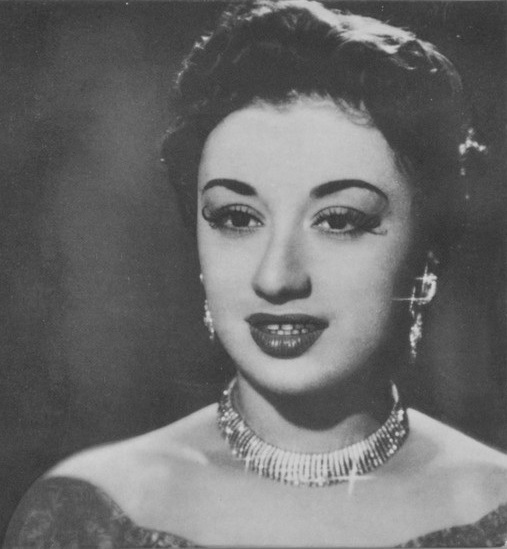
- Salam in 1959
- Born: Najah Mohieddin Salam; 13 March 1931; Beirut, Lebanon
- Died: 28 September 2023 (aged 92); Beirut, Lebanon
- Other names: Najah Sallam

Najah Salam (Arabic: نجاح سلام, also spelled Najah Sallam and Nagah Salem; 13 March 1931 – 28 September 2023) was a Lebanese singer and film actress.

== Life and career ==
Born in Beirut, the daughter of the composer and writer Mohieddin Salam, she started her musical career in 1949, recording her first songs in Cairo, where she had moved with her father. Specialized in political songs with patriotic and pan-Arabist contents, she reached the peak of fame during the Suez Crisis, when her songs "Ya 'aghlaa aism fi Alwujudi" ('O Most Precious Name in Existence') and "'Ana alniyl muqbarat lilghazaati" ('I am the Nile, a cemetery for invaders') became very popular. In her home country, she is best known for the song "Lubnan durat alsharq" ('Lebanon is the jewel of the East').

As an actress, Salam made her debut in Helmy Rafla's Ala Kayfak (1952), and appeared in numerous films for over a decade, being best known for her leading role in Mohamed Abdel Gawad's El Saad waad.

Honoured with the title of Knight by Elias Hrawi, Salam was married to actor Muhammad Salman from the mid-1950s until his death in 1997. She died on 28 September 2023, at the age of 92.
