= Omar Al-Shammaa =

Lebanese film and voice actor (born 1946)

- عمر الشماع
- Born: 1946 (age 79–80); Verdun, Beirut, Lebanon
- Occupations: Actor, voice actor

Omar Al-Shammaa (Arabic: عمر الشماع; born 1946) is a Lebanese film and voice actor.

== Filmography ==
=== Film ===
- Princess of Rome .2015
- Asfouri - Abu Abed. 2012

=== Television ===
- Izz ad-Din al-Qassam - Yusuf. 1999
- Arabic Language Club. 1998
- Laugh and Cry. 1997
- The Miserables. 1974
- The River. 1974

=== Dubbing roles ===
- 1001 Nights - Majid (second voice)
- Alice in Wonderland - Mad Hatter (Classical Arabic version)
- Atlantis: Milo's Return - Preston B. Whitmore (Classical Arabic version)
- Atlantis: The Lost Empire - Preston B. Whitmore (Classical Arabic version)
- Bolt (2008 film) - Dr. Forrester (Classical Arabic version)
- Ratatouille - Horst (Classical Arabic version)
- Robin Hood - Nutsy (Classical Arabic version)
- Arabian Nights: Sinbad's Adventures – Blue Demon
- Treasure Planet - Billy Bones (Classical Arabic version)
- Up (2009 film) - Carl Fredricksen (Classical Arabic version)
