= Nadia Gamal =

Egyptian dancer and actress

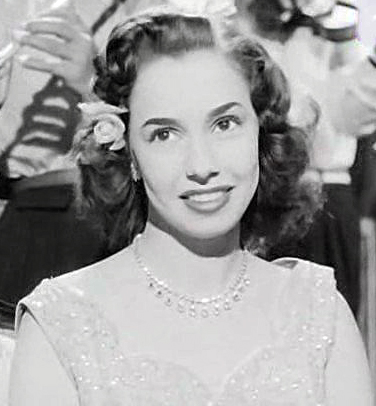
- Born: Maria Carydias; 1937; Alexandria, Egypt
- Died: 1990 (aged 52–53); Beirut, Lebanon
- Occupation: Dancer
- Years active: 1953–1990
- Partner: Shammi Kapoor (1953-1955)

Nadia Gamal (Arabic: نادية جمال, 1937 – 1990) was an Egyptian dancer and actress. She is known of mixing local Egyptian belly dance with Western Waltz, Cowboy, Cha Cha and other.

== Early life and career ==
Born as Maria Carydias to a Greek father and Italian mother in Alexandria, Egypt. Gamal first began dancing as a part of her mother's cabaret act. Trained in piano as well as several kinds of dance such as ballet and tap, Gamal initially performed European folk dances in her mother's act. When she was 14, an ill dancer in her mother's troupe gave her the opportunity to dance raqs sharqi in Lebanon, which her father had forbidden her to do because of her youth. After this debut, she became a popular dancer and went on to star in many Egyptian films.

In 1953, she dated Indian movie star Shammi Kapoor after they met in Sri Lanka, but she moved back to Cairo. She did perform in a number of Indian movies too.

In 1968, Gamal became the first raqs sharqi dancer to perform at the Baalbeck International Festival. She also appeared at the Cairo Opera House and danced for King Hussein and the Shah of Iran. Gamal toured Asia, the Middle East, Europe, Latin America, and North America during her career. In 1978 and 1981 she briefly taught dance workshops in New York City. Later in her career, Gamal started a school of dance.

== Illness and Death ==
Gamal was diagnosed with breast cancer in 1990, and while undergoing treatment in Beirut contracted pneumonia and died.

== Style and influence ==
Gamal was known for her extensive use of floorwork. She also often included raqs baladi (folkloric dance), Bedouin dances and Zār dance with raqs sharqi in her performances.

She influenced many dancers such as Ibrahim Farrah, Suhaila Salimpour, and Claire Naffa.

== Filmography ==
- Prem Pujari (1970)
- Bazi-e eshgh (1968)
- Bazy-e-shance (1968)
- Mawal al akdam al zahabiya (1966)
- Twenty-Four Hours to Kill (1965)
- Garo (1965)
- Layali al chark (1965)
- Zenubba (1956)
- Mawwal
