= Carmen Lebbos =

Lebanese actress (born 1963)

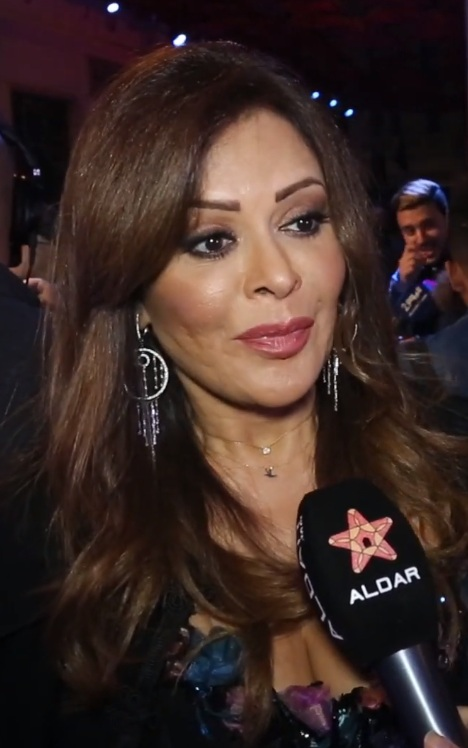
- Lebbos in 2018
- Born: Carmen Elias Lebbos; 22 February 1963 (age 63); Beirut, Lebanon
- Occupation: Actress
- Years active: 1979–present
- Website: www.carmenlebbos.com

Carmen Lebbos (Arabic: كارمن لبّس; born 22 February 1963) is a Lebanese theater, television, and film actress who has worked in film, television actress. Lebbos has been active since 1981; she has been in several television series and movies including Ziad Doueiri's West Beirut and Josef Fares's Zozo.

== Biography ==
Lebbos was born in Beirut to a working-class family.

=== Personal life ===
Lebbos was in a fifteen year long relationship with famed Lebanese musician Ziad Rahbani.
