= Bosta (film) =

- Directed by: Philippe Aractingi
- Written by: Philippe Aractingi
- Produced by: Philippe Aractingi
- Starring: Rodney el Haddad; Nadine Labaki; Nada Abou Farhat; Omar Rajeh; Liliane Nemri; Bshara Atallah; Mounir Malaeb; Mahmoud Mabsout; Rana Alamudin Karam; Sabah; Badr Haddad
- Edited by: Dana K. Trometer
- Music by: Simon Emmerson; Ali El Khatib; Martin Russell
- Release date: 2005
- Running time: 142 minutes
- Country: Lebanon
- Language: Arabic

Bosta (English: The Autobus Arabic: Bosta — بوسطة) is a 2005 Lebanese film by the director Philippe Aractingi. Bosta is a story of young Lebanese artists who meet again, after being separated, and tour different cities of Lebanon in an old bus, performing a techno version of the dabkeh that shocks conservatives, but moves forward towards the future. Simon Emmerson and Martin Russell from the group, Afro Celt Sound System composed original music for the dabkeh (dance) sequences and composed the film's underscore respectively.

Quoting from the official site:

Bosta is a road musical that takes the audience on a wonderful journey across various Lebanese regions... a journey accompanied by a groundbreaking soundtrack and, of course, this truly pioneering dance, the electro-dabkeh.

Bosta was the best selling film in Lebanon in 2006. The movie was submitted as the official Lebanese entry in the 79th Academy Awards (Oscars) in the Best Foreign Language Film category.
