= Philippe Aractingi =

Franco-Lebanese filmmaker

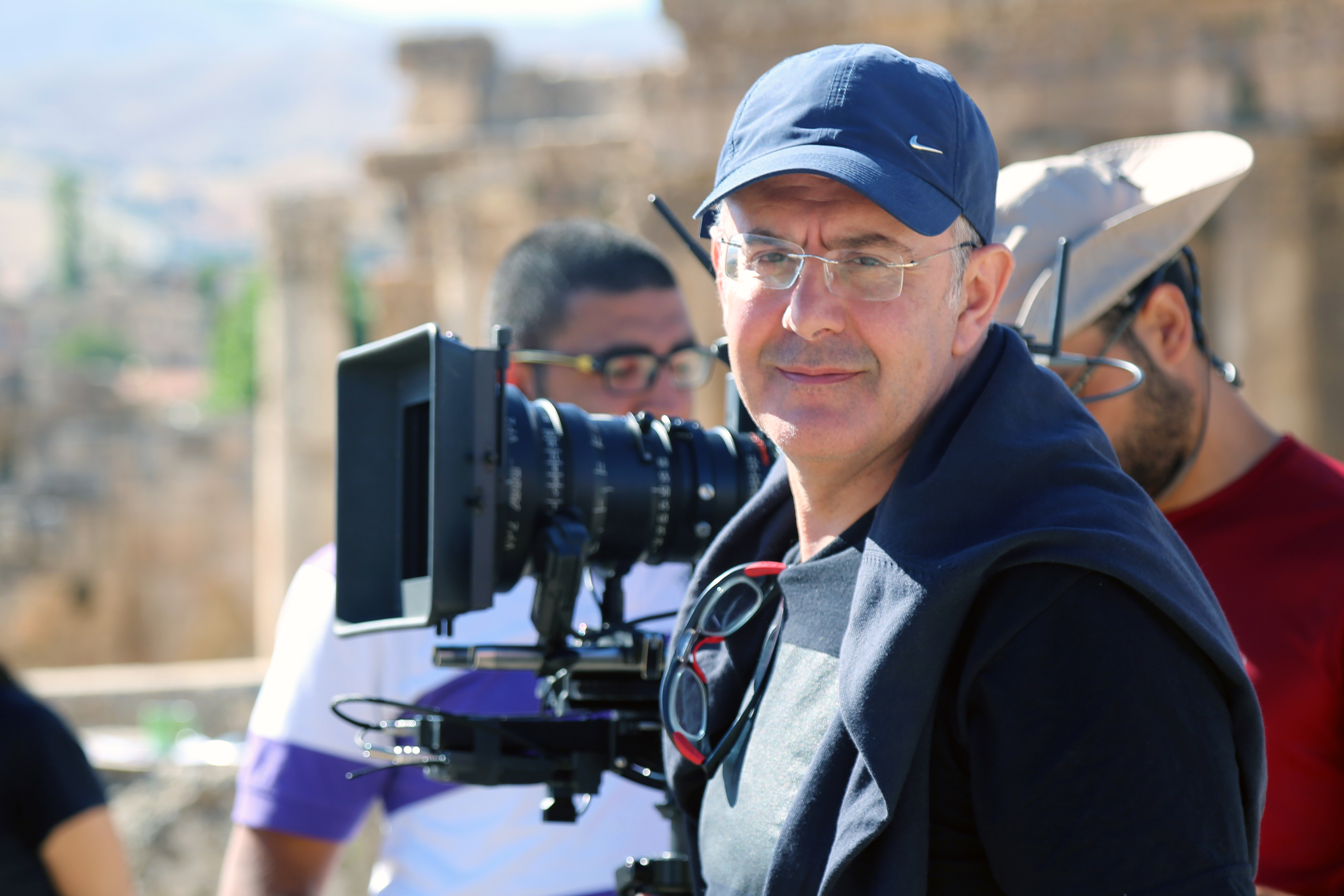
Philippe Aractingi in 2016

Philippe Aractingi (فيليب عرقتنجي) (born in Beirut, Lebanon) is a Franco-Lebanese author, director, producer, actor and photographer.

== Biography ==
Self-taught in his specialty, Philippe Aractingi has directed more than 70 documentaries in various formats and lengths, and 4 feature films, which have been distributed worldwide and awarded more than 40 times at various international festivals, in Venice, Dubai, Thessaloniki, Rotterdam, and at the Sundance Film Festival, among other events in the film industry.

Two of his films, Bosta and Under the Bombs, were both Lebanon selection at the Oscars in 2006 and 2009, respectively.

Aractingi is the co-founder of the Lebanese Cinema Foundation (FLC) and the vice-chairman of the Beirut Screen Institute Committee.

In 2018, Aractingi was appointed Chevalier de l’Ordre des Arts et des Lettres by the French Ministry of Culture.

== Early life ==
Philippe Aractingi was born in Beirut, Lebanon in 1964. At the age of 8, his father gave him his first camera. From the age of 16, living on the demarcation line in the midst of the Lebanese war, he captured photographs of the war, that went on to be published in various international news publications.

At the time, film was not yet a discipline taught in schools. However, Aractingi was not discouraged by this and decided to teach himself, despite the lack of audiovisual programs availabilities in a war-ridden country. At the age of 20, he filmed his first broadcast documentary, in his hometown, Beirut.

== Personal life ==
Aractingi has a wife, Diane and three children, Matthieu, Luc and Eve. The family has fled Lebanon several times, during periods of conflict.

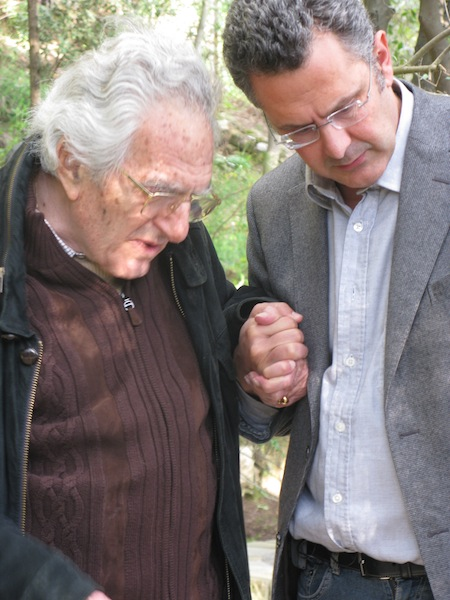
Philippe Aractingi alongside former politician Ghassan Tueni (left)

== Documentaries ==
Philippe moved to Paris in 1989, at the age of 25. There, he dedicated the following 12 years of his career to writing, directing, and occasionally producing and co-producing over 50 documentaries and short films for renowned international TV channels such as The Discovery Channel, France Télé, Arte, NDR, Sky. He shot most of his works in various countries such as Egypt, France, Mongolia, Morocco, South Africa, Sri Lanka, and Tunisia, among other locations.

Amongst his most notable documentaries are Vol Libre au Liban in 1991, that won the Best Short Film Award at the Saint-Hilary Film Festival; Par le Regard des Mères in 1992, that competed in the Vision du réel Film Festival in Nyon; and Beyrouth de Pierre et de Mémoire in 1992, that won the gold medal of Jeux de la Francophonie. In 1995, he also released Le Rêve de l’Enfant Acrobate which won the Grand Jury Prize at the Beirut Film Festival.

== Feature films ==
In 2005, after returning to Lebanon, Philippe Aractingi produced and directed his first feature film Bosta, a post-war Lebanese musical. The film was critically acclaimed and broke audience records in Lebanon with more than 140,000 box office admissions. 100% Produced and financed by Lebanese contributors, this musical broke the traditional depiction of war in films and went on to reconcile the Lebanese public with the cinema, opening the door to a new generation of Lebanese films.

The film received eight awards, including Best Screenplay at the Carthage Film Festival (JCC), the Golden Murex in Beirut in 2006, and the Best First Work Award at the Arab Film Festival in Rotterdam.

In 2006, when another war broke out in Lebanon, Philippe Aractingi filmed his second movie, "Under the Bombs", which accompanies two professional actors throughout the turmoil, to later come face-to-face with real players who partook in the 2006 Lebanese-Israeli war. The film narrates the tale of a woman's relentless quest to locate her sister and son amidst the war-torn landscape.

Released in 2008, “Under The Bombs” was distributed in 30 countries and selected in over 40 festivals, including Venice, BAFTA, Dubai and the Sundance Film Festival. It won 23 awards worldwide, including the Best Actress Award and the Golden Muhr at the International Film Festival. The Audience Award at the Dubai Film Festival (DIFF); the Best Music and the Jury's Choice at the Luchon Festival in 2008, the Netpac and Critic's Awards in Antalya in 2007 and the Fipresci Prize at the Bratislava International Film Festival.

Under the Bombs and Bosta were both selected to represent Lebanon at the Oscars in 2006 and 2009 respectively.

In 2014, Philippe Aractingi ventured into autobiography with Heritages, a revamped documentary with a hint of fiction that recounts the various exiles that he and his family had to go through over the past 4 generations, summing up to 100 years of history. Experimenting with a radical new film-making style, he interlaces directed scenes and archive images with video-filmed personal diaries, family photos and super 8 reels.

The film was nominated at the Dubai International Film Festival (DIFF), the Thessaloniki International Film Festival, and the FIPA, International Festival of Audio Visual Programs. It is currently a case study in more than 30 schools and universities around the world, including Boston University.

In 2017, Aractingi released Listen, a modern-day love story that defied Middle Eastern social norms. Listen tells the story of a sound engineer who meets and falls in love with a strong and free-spirited girl, who suddenly slips away in a coma. This story deals with the contemporary emancipation of women in the Middle East, and is as well a journey through sound and the importance of hearing.

When it aired for the first time at the Dubai International Film Festival (DIFF), Listen raised reactions from its audience including being moved and shocked. Due to its PG-18 in Lebanon, authorities prohibited its distribution in the rest of the Arab world, but the film persisted to win 8 international prizes, including the Best Sound, Best Picture and Best Director awards at the Lebanese Movie Awards (LMA), and represented Lebanon at the Golden Globes in 2017.

In 2018-19, Philippe returned to documentary filmmaking with On the Footsteps of Christ, co-produced with the Maronite Foundation, a mixture of fiction and documentary that retraces the journey of Jesus Christ in southern Lebanon.

In 2019, he released Thawra Soul, a short movie documenting the "Thawra" Lebanese revolution which began in October 2019.

In 2023-24, Aractingi directed an archaeological documentary, Liban, Les secrets du royaume de Byblos. Produced by Gedeon Programmes and broadcast on Arte in January 2025, the 90-minute feature won the Grand Jury Prize at FICAB 2024 – Festival Internacional de Cine Arqueologico del Bidasoa, in Spain. It follows an archaeological mission led by Tania Zaven (Direction des Antiquités du Liban) and Julien Chanteau (Musée du Louvre) in Byblos.

Philippe continues to write scripts to this day, such as The Rock of Tanios, an adaptation of Amin Maalouf’s famed novel which won the Prix Goncourt in 1993.

== Production Company ==
In 1989, Aractingi founded a production company, Fantascope, which allowed him to direct his feature films in a country where cinema was almost non-existent.

To date, Fantascope Production has produced more than a hundred films broadcast on international TV channels such as the Discovery Channel, France 2, France 3, Arte, NDR, and BSkyB.

Additionally, Fantascope Production has produced a series of corporate films.

== Corporate ==
Aractingi has also made significant and numerous cultural contributions, offering consulting services and producing museum and tourist films on commission for diverse organizations worldwide. Among them are the films for the Museum of the American University of Beirut, the in-flight safety regulations for Lebanon’s Middle East Airline (MEA), the Museum of Ksara Wine, and the Museum of the Central Bank of Lebanon.

In addition, Aractingi has served as a consultant for various embassies, including the US, advising on matters pertaining to cinema and culture.

He played a role in formulating an audiovisual co-production agreement between France and Lebanon.

Appointed by the Ministry of Culture in Saudi Arabia, he has also conducted introductory documentary courses for Saudi students.

== Theater ==
In 2023, Philippe made his foray into the world of theater with his debut production, Sar Waet El Haki (Let's talk, it's about time), written and performed by himself and directed by Lina Abyad.

In this autobiographical solo-show, Philippe Aractingi temporarily loses himself in thought, considering the path that has led him to make numerous films. He who, in his youth, had difficulties to speak. As an intense quest of expression, this play weaves together projected films through fragmented screens, audio narratives, music, and occasional dance to delve into themes of language and identity.

After its success in Lebanon, the play was programmed at the Journées Théâtrales de Carthage in Tunis, then in Paris, at Essaïon Theater – where it was shown for 3 months, as well as in the Arabisches Theatertreffen Festival in Hannover, Germany.

== Photography, videography and exhibitions ==
From the age of 8, Philippe Aractingi began experimenting with cameras. When the war broke out, he went out into the streets to capture the scenes. Horrified by what he saw, he decided to stop taking pictures for quite some time. In 2010, he finally decided to get back behind the camera and developed a series for an exhibition in Paris, “Nuit sur Beyrouth”, displaying a wide array of shots of Beirut by night. Some of the shots also showed a patchwork of color where the city could be seen, fully lit up on one side but overcome by darkness on the other side, due to its infamously frequent power cuts.

His second exhibit, “Obsessions”, took place in Beirut in 2018 and depicted the city’s evolution over time.

The exhibition was accompanied by an installation called “Beirut Through Time”, a setup of three screens showing the city of Beirut from three different perspectives: each displaying video footages of the same places at different times and stages: life, death and afterlife – before, during and after the civil war.

In 2022, Philippe took part in a collective exhibition, "Hunna", celebrating women through Art. Aractingi roamed the streets of Dubai, Paris, Cannes and Beirut, armed with a disposable camera, to capture snapshots of women's legs, unknown, fleeting beauties.

== Partial filmography ==
=== Bosta (2005) ===
Bosta is a musical road movie. Seven old school friends reunite after a fifteen year separation, to reform their old dabke (traditional Lebanese dance) troupe and travel around Lebanon in order to present a techno form of this dance. They embark on a repainted old school bus (Bosta in Arabic) for a journey that will confront them with themselves and the multiple identities of the country.

Adopting a musical form and a light tone, Philippe Aractingi tackles difficult themes such as reconciliation with the past, tolerance between religions, the relationship with the father, homosexuality and the position of women in Lebanese society.

=== Under The Bombs (2008) ===
Summer of 2006. Zeina lives in Dubai. In the middle of a divorce, she decides to send her son Karim to stay with her sister in a small village in the South of Lebanon, to spare him his parents' fighting.

A few days later, war breaks out in Lebanon. Desperate with worry, Zeina arrives in Beirut on the day of the ceasefire. There, she meets Tony, the only taxi driver who agrees to take her to southern Lebanon despite the situation. Together, they take a risky journey around the scarred region in search of her sister and her son.

=== Heritages (2014) – Documentary ===
On the 12th of July 2006, a new war begins in Lebanon. While fleeing his country once again, director Philippe Aractingi becomes aware that, like him, his ancestors have been fleeing wars and massacres for five generations. In a fresco where photos, archives, and a playful mise-en-scene in which he integrates his children, he undertakes the story of his family's peregrinations across the Levant. A film about exile, memory and transmission, full of emotions and honesty.

=== Listen (2018) ===
Despite living in a doomed country that hangs by a thread, Joud, a handsome and shy 24 year old sound engineer meets and falls in love with strong and free-spirited Rana. The young lovers, from completely different social and religious backgrounds, are drawn closer to each other, but a drastic turn of events gets between them and Rana suddenly slips away. As her parents forbid Joud from seeing her, the young man, determined to see her again, finds new means of communicating with her by convincing Marwa, her sister, to download his voice messages and secretly play them to Rana...

=== Some of his documentaries ===
- Liban, Les secrets du royaume de Byblos, documentary, for ARTE, 2024
- Thawra Soul, 2019
- On the Footsteps of Christ, 2019, 77’
- Une terre pour un homme, 2012, 42’
- Oman, entre hier et demain, 2000, 52’
- The White Oryx, for Discovery Channel, 1997, Saudi Arabia, 26’
- Le Rêve de l’Enfant Acrobate, 1995, Morocco, 52’
- Sri Lanka, de pierres et de prières, Film about archeology, 1995, 52'
- Mr Girafes, for Discovery Channel, 1995, South Africa, 26'
- Vol Libre au Liban (Short Film), 1993, 18’
- Through Mother’s eyes, 1992, 52’
- Beyrouth de Pierre et de Mémoire (Essai), 1992 ,18’

=== Corporate Films ===
- Museum of the American University of Beirut
- Museum of Ksara wine
- Banque du Liban – BDL
- Baalbek Film Festival
- Lebanon a destination for films : Ministry of Tourism + Lebanese Embassy in Paris
- MEA – Safety video
- Millennium Development (Lebanon and Dubai)
- K.A. Care – Saudi Arabia
- CHUD – Cultural Development and reconstruction (CDR)

== Writings ==
- Métier de femme, métier de mère : Book co-written with Lela Chikhani-Nacouz, an essay that tells the strength and suffering of Lebanese mothers put in pictures in 1992 Through Mother’s Eyes
- Nabil le petit étranger (screenplay) : Prize Maroun Baghdadi of the Best Script at the International Beirut Festival, 1998; Lauréat de la Bourse Beaumarchais, 1995. Scriptwriting contribution by "la commission de l’avance sur recette du CNC", 1996
- Forgiveness (movie screenplay, in progress)
- London Halal (movie screenplay, in progress)
- Casserola (movie screenplay co-written with Maya Nassar, in progress)
- The Rock of Tanios (movie screenplay, in progress)
- The Tale of Reem (movie screenplay, in progress)
- Captagon (series screenplay, in progress)

== Awards and recognition ==
=== Bosta (2005/6) ===
Awards :

- Best Scenario Award at Carthage Festival in 2002
- Murex D’Or in Lebanon
- Best First Work Award at the Arab Film Festival Rotterdam
- IMA Award for First Feature Film
- Audience Award at the Queens International Festival
- Young Audience Award at Artemare Festival of Corsica.

=== Under the Bombs (2007/8) ===
Official selection at Sundance Film Festival 2008

23 prizes, amongst which are:

- The Golden Muhr Award and the Best Film and Best Actress Award at the Festival of Dubai (2007)
- EIUC Human Rights Film Award at the Venice Film Festival (2007)
- Critics Award and NETPAC Award at the Antalya Festival (2007)
- FIPRESCI International Critics Award, Festival Bratislava (2008)
- Best Actress, Special Mention, Prize of the FIPRESCI, at Bratislava International Film Festival
- Best feature film in the One World Media Award in London (2009)
- Arca Cinema Giovanni Award, Venice Film Festival (2007)
- Junior Jury Prize, Festival du Film Francophone de Namur (2007)
- Best film (Golden Pony Award), Dubai International Film Festival (2007)
- Best Actress Award, Dubai International Film Festival (2007)
- Best Original Score, Luchon Film Festival (2008)
- Audience Award, Luchon Film Festival (2008)
- Coup de cœur du jury, Luchon Film Festival (2008)
- Amnesty International Award, Opendoek Festival in Trunhout (2008)
- Audience Award, Festival du Film des Droits à la Personne, Montreal (2008)
- Human Rights Award, Bahrain Film Festival (2008)
- Best Actress Award, Oran Arab Film Festival (2008)
- Best Actor Award, Rotterdam Arab Film Festival (2008)
- Silver Medal for Best Film, Rotterdam Arab Film Festival (2008)
- Best International Feature Film, 22nd Festival international du cinéma francophone en Acadie (Canada).

=== Heritages (2014) ===
Nominations :

- DIFF 2013, FIPA and Thessaloniki Festivals

Awards :

- The Silver HAMBRA award: Granada Cines del Sur Film Festival
- The Audience Award: Arab Film Festival – San Francisco
- Best Director and Best Editing in the Lebanese Movie Guide Awards 2015

=== Listen (2018) ===
Nominations :

- DIFF – Dubai International Film Festival
- LFF – Lebanese Film Festival Australia
- AFF – Arab film festival in Minnesota
- AFF – Arab film festival in GERMANY (Tubingen)

Awards :

- LEBANESE MOVIE AWARDS (LMA) – best sound, best cinematography, best film, best script (selon le dossier de présentation de tes films)
- WINNER film critic award Alexandria Mediterranean Film Festival

=== Through Mother's eyes (1992) ===
Official selection at the Festival du Film de Nyon

=== Beyrouth de Pierre et de Mémoire (1992) ===
- Gold medal at the "jeux de la Francophonie" – Paris, 1994
- Jury recognition at "Journées du Cinéma Africain et Créole" – Montreal, 1995

=== Vol Libre au Liban (1993) ===
- Jury price at the “festival international de Saint-Hilaire”, 1991
- Lauréat de l’Académie Carat, 1992

=== Le Rêve de l’Enfant Acrobate (1995) ===
Grand Jury price at the Beirut Film Festival, 1997

=== Liban, Les secrets du royaume de Byblos (2024) ===
Grand Jury Prize at FICAB – Festival Internacional de Cine Arqueologico del Bidasoa, 2024
