= When Maryam Spoke Out =

2001 film

- Directed by: Assad Fouladkar
- Written by: Assad Fouladkar
- Produced by: Assad Fouladkar; The Lebanese American University
- Starring: Bernadette Hodeib; Talal El-Jordi; Renée Dik; Umaya Lahoud; Joseph Abu-Dames; Randa Alam
- Cinematography: Joseph Chmali
- Music by: Nidaa Abou Mrad
- Release date: October 6, 2001 (Mill Valley Film Festival)
- Running time: 98 minutes
- Country: Lebanon
- Language: Arabic

When Maryam Spoke Out (Arabic: لمّا حكيت مريم, romanized: Lamma hikyit maryam) is a 2001 Lebanese film directed by Assad Fouladkar and it is based on a true event that happened in Lebanon.

It is a social story about a couple, Ziad and Maryam, who lead a happy marriage, except for the fact that after three years of marriage Maryam has still not had a baby. Her husband Ziad is compassionate and assures her, that he still loves her. Nonetheless, Maryam cannot escape the growing pressure from the family, especially from her mother-in-law. She reacts to it in her own way with a false pregnancy. The initial enthusiasm and care is quickly gone when it becomes clear they are not really expecting a baby.

When Maryam Spoke Out is Fouladkar's first feature film.

== Synopsis ==
After three years of happily married life, Ziyad and Maryam feel the social pressure to have a child. Their previously happy relationship becomes poisoned when it is discovered that Maryam is infertile.

== Cast and characters ==
- Bernadette Hodeib as Maryam
- Talal El-Jordi as Ziyad
- Renée Dik
- Umaya Lahoud
- Joseph Abu-Dames
- Randa Alam

== Awards ==
- Best performance by an actress for Bernadette Hodeib at the sixth Biennale des Cinemas Arabes, 2002, Paris, France.
- Best Film and Best performance by an actress for Bernadette Hodeib at the Carthage Film Festival, 2002, Carthage, Tunisia.
- Best Film and Best performance by an actress for Bernadette Hodeib at the Alexandria Film Festival, Egypt
- Best actress for Bernadette Hodeib, Critics Award and the Golden Dagger for Assad Fouladkar at the Muscat Film Festival, 2003, Amman.
