= Georges Nasser =

Lebanese filmmaker (1927–2019)

- Born: 15 June 1927; Tripoli, North Governorate, Lebanon
- Died: 23 January 2019 (aged 91)
- Occupation: film director
- Years active: 1957–1975

Georges Nasser (Arabic: جورج نصر; 15 June 1927 – 23 January 2019) was a Lebanese director. He is considered to have been a pioneering figure in Lebanese cinema and is credited with having put Lebanon on global movie-making map.

== Early life ==
Nasser was born in Tripoli on 15 June 1927, the fifth of 11 children. He attended the School of the Holy Hearts until the age of 7 and then the College of the Brothers of the Holy Family. During his childhood he was a keen fan of film, watching up to eight a week at the cinema. Nasser moved to California to attend UCLA and became one the first Arab filmmakers to obtain a film degree in the United States. Though he had originally intended to study architecture as he was unaware that cinema studies was a subject. At UCLA he met fellow film students George Roy Hill and John Ford.

== Career ==
After graduating from UCLA in the mid-50s, he returned to Lebanon to direct his first feature, Ila Ayn (1957), which became the first Lebanese film to be featured In Selection at Cannes Film Festival. After sixty years, the film was screened again in its restored print version as part of the Cannes Classics events in 2017, after which Nasser, who is known as the "Father of Lebanese Cinema" received a standing ovation. Although his career was cut short by the Lebanese civil war, he has mentored a new generation of Lebanese filmmakers as an instructor at the Lebanese Academy of Fine Arts. Nasser also attempted to establish a film-making syndicate in the aftermath of the war. In the 1990s he began a project to create a film of the life of Egyptian actress Faten Hamama entitled Lee Ouyon al-Nas but it was never completed. In his late career he completed several short films for the Lebanese Army. He died on 23 January 2019, aged 91 and was buried at the St. Maroun Church in Tripoli on 24 January.

== Filmography ==
=== Ila Ayn? (1957) ===
The film known in French as Vers L'Inconnu, was a mix of melodrama and Italian neo-realism, and cowritten with Halim Fares and Youssef Habchi Achkar. The film examines poetically the themes of exile and emigration. It tells the story of a family from an obscure village in Mount Lebanon. Because the family is struggling, the father decides, like most men in the Levant at the time, to immigrate to Brazil, leaving his wife to raise the children, but he’s never heard from again. Nasser made the film at a time when Lebanon had a fledgling film industry, and so his cast was completely nonprofessional. q digital restoration of the original 35mm film was completed in time for its 60th anniversary. In addition to screening again at the Cannes Film Festival as part of the Cannes Classics series, the restored copy of the film was screened in Lebanon at the Metropolis Empire Sofil in Achrafieh in January 2018.

=== The Small Stranger (1962) ===
His second feature, The Small Stranger (or Le Petit Étranger) was also selected for Cannes in 1962. The French-language film was a coming of age story about a young country boy who moves to the city and gets seduced by it.

=== Only One Man Wanted (1975) ===
Nasser's third feature was produced by the National Film Organization and partially shot in Syria
