= Cinema of Lebanon =

- City Mall Beirut
- No. of screens: 154 (2019)
  - Per capita: 4.7 per 100,000 (2009)
- Main distributors: Haddad & Co; Italia Film; Fathalla

Produced feature films (2015)
- Total: 31
- Fictional: 17 (56%)
- Animated: 1 (1%)
- Documentary: 14 (42%)

Number of admissions (2010)
- Total: 2,794,708
- National films: 16,666 (0.49%)

Gross box office (2006)
- Total: £L48.4 million
- National films: £L2 million (4.1%)

The cinema of Lebanon, according to film critic and historian Roy Armes, is the only other cinema in the Arabic-speaking region, beside Egypt's, that could amount to a national cinema. Cinema in Lebanon has been in existence since the 1920s, and the country has produced more than 500 films.

While there has been steady increase in film production since the end of the Lebanese Civil War, the number of films produced each year remains relatively small in comparison to what it used to be in the 1960s, and the industry remains heavily dependent on foreign funding, mainly European. The industry also remains reliant on international box office revenues due to the limited size of the domestic market.

Despite that, local films have enjoyed a degree of local and international success. Ziad Doueiry's The Insult was nominated for an Academy Award for Best Foreign Language Film. Nadine Labaki's three features have been screened at the Cannes Film Festival, starting with Caramel in the Directors' Fortnight. Her second feature Where Do We Go Now? was screened in Un Certain Regard and later won the People's Choice Award at the Toronto International Film Festival while her third feature, Capernaum, was nominated for a Palme D'Or and an Academy Award for Best Foreign Language Film.

== History ==
The history of film in Lebanon goes back to the 1890s. Two years after the Lumière Brothers publicly projected their first film in December 1895 (Paris, France), they began sending traveling representatives to tour different countries to show their movies. One of the cities that they visited was Lebanon's capital city, Beirut. Several years later, in 1909, the first movie theater was opened in the same city by the Pathé Frères. These events helped cultivate a film-viewing culture into the country. The first Lumiere operator who went to Lebanon was Alexandre Promio.

=== French Mandate ===
A sharp increase in the number of theaters was observed between 1923 and 1929. By the end of the 1920s, cinemas were common in Beirut, and some were used as a place for political gatherings. For example, in 1925, the Communist Party met at the Crystal Cinema in Beirut. Cinemas had become so popular that in 1931, students marched in a protest, demanding that prices of movie tickets be lowered. To compete against Hollywood, France decreed that all American films that were being imported to Lebanon be dubbed into French.

The first local film, The Adventures of Elias Mabruk, was made in 1929. It was a silent film, directed by Jordano Pidutti. Pidutti was an Italian immigrant who worked as a chauffeur for the Sursock family before devoting his life to film. His first film, The Adventures of Elias Mabruk tells the story of a Lebanese emigrant who returns to Lebanon after a long absence in America in search of his family. This tale of an emigrant's homecoming, captured nostalgic feelings in a country of emigrants and would become a recurrent theme in Lebanese cinema. Jordano Pidutti's second film was The Adventures of Abu Abed. The comedy is considered the first film made with Lebanese funding. The financier was Rachid Ali Chaaban, who was also the star of the film.

Lebanese women, like Assia Dagher and Mary Queeny, played pioneering roles in Egyptian cinema. In Lebanon, Herta Gargour, who managed the film studio, Luminar Films, is credited with establishing filmmaking in Lebanon after the silent era. In the Ruins of Baalbeck (1936), which was produced by Luminar Films, was the first sound film. It was a hit with audiences and profitable. The film, which was directed by Julio De Luca and Karam Boustany, depicted the love story of a local prince who falls in love with a foreigner. The film is considered the first Arab film produced entirely in an Arab country and featuring the Lebanese dialect.

Ali Al-Ariss became the first Lebanese-born to direct a film on his own when he made The Rose Seller in 1940, which was followed by Planet of the Desert Princess

Documentaries were also being made during this period, but they were heavily censored by the French.

=== Post-Independence ===
After Lebanon gained its independence from France, filmmakers began to examine local themes, especially rural life and folklore. During the post-independence period, Lebanon witnessed an economic boom that made its capital, Beirut, the financial center of the eastern Mediterranean. Lebanon's economic success, along with the presence of 38 banks and its open, multi-cultural and liberal society, made the country an alternative production choice to Egypt, which was at the time the center of filmmaking in the Arabic-speaking world. Additionally, "Lebanon had the region's best technical facilities" for film production. Fully equipped studios were set up in 1952, such as Haroun Studio owned by Michel Haroun and Al-Arz Studio

For the first half of the twentieth century, Lebanese cinema was very closely associated with Egyptian cinema. In addition to exporting numerous Lebanese actors and actresses, such as Nour Al Hoda and Sabah, belly dancers like Badia Massabni and producers like Assia Dagher, Lebanese distributors monopolized export of Egyptian film from 1930s – 1970s.

The first Lebanese film to be featured In Selection at Cannes Film Festival Georges Nasser's Ila Ayn? (English Title: Where To?) in 1958. Despite its success abroad and having been screened at numerous film festivals, such as in Moscow and Beijing, the movie theaters in Lebanon hesitated to screen the film, and it only received a limited screening in Cinema Opera. For its sixty-year anniversary, the film was screened again in its restored print version as part of the Cannes Classics events in 2017. George Nasser's work has been more appreciated in recent years, and the filmmaker, who taught at the Lebanese Academy of Fine Arts has been showered with accolades, including at the Tripoli Film Festival, which was held in his honor in 2017.

Co-productions with Egypt and Syria were common in this period, which was considered the "Golden Age" of the Lebanese film industry. Additionally, Lebanese producers from 1945 up to 1951 played an influential role in the first stages of production of Iraqi cinema.

==== The Golden Age ====
The film industry continued to prosper in the 1960s. After Gamal Abdel Nasser nationalized the film industry in Egypt in 1963, many private producers, distributors and directors, including Youssef Chahine, moved to Lebanon. The migration of film production to Beirut ushered a Golden Age, making Lebanon the film set for almost all Egyptian movies and establishing the Lebanese film industry as the second largest in the Arab world. Beirut rivaled Cairo's dominance of Arab filmmaking, and even briefly replaced it as the center for Arab filmmaking; however, films produced in the sixties, for the most part, lacked a sense of national identity and were merely commercial films, targeting a pan-Arab audience. For instance, Lebanese filmmaker, Mohammed Selmane made a series of Bedouin-themed films, like Bedouin in Paris (1964) and Bedouin in Rome (1965), both starring Samira Tewfik and targeting not only local but also Syrian, Iraqi, Jordanian and Gulf audiences. Mohamed Selmane, who was trained in Egypt and returned to Lebanon to make 30 films in 25 years, was one of the most successful directors of this period.

The musicals of the Rahbani Brothers that starred Fairuz were an exception to the films that lacked a national identity. The Rahbani films were centered around nostalgic themes of life in Mount Lebanon villages. Nostalgia was a common theme in Lebanese film since 1929. While many films in the sixties were filmed in the Egyptian vernacular to cater to the large Egyptian market, the Rahbani films were filmed in the Lebanese dialect. The Seller of Rings (Arabic: بياع الخواتم) (1965), set in a village and displaying folkloristic elements, was an adaption of one of their operettas to the screen. Another Rahbani film, Safar Barlik, which was set in 1912, depicted Lebanon's struggle against the Ottoman occupation. The film became a staple rerun on Lebanese television, especially on Independence Day.

Giuseppe Vincenti launched Italia Film in Beirut in 1962, turning it into one of the region’s biggest independent film distributors, and in 1993 becoming Disney’s key West Asian partner.

There were other exceptions like the auteur films of George Nasser and Youssef Maalouf. Georges Nasser's second feature, The Small Stranger was also selected for Cannes in 1962. Youssef Maalouf adapted to film Kahlil Gibran's novel, The Broken Wings in 1962. Prints of the film The Broken Wings were believed to have been destroyed during the war, but one was found after the war stored in a church, and the film, starring stage actress Nidal Al-Askhar, was restored.

Lebanon became a filming location for international productions. For example, in 1965, Val Guest's Where the Spies Are, starring David Niven and Françoise Dorléac, was filmed in Beirut. Twenty-Four Hours to Kill, starring Mickey Rooney, and Secret Agent Fireball, starring Richard Harrison, were also filmed in Beirut the same year. The following year in 1966, the German director, Manfred R. Köhler, filmed his film, Agent 505: Death Trap in Beirut. George Lautner's La grande sauterelle was also filmed in Beirut in 1967. Rebus, starring Ann-Margret was filmed on location at the Casino du Liban in 1969. While Honeybaby, Honeybaby was shot in 1974 in Beirut, the producers of The Man with the Golden Gun, which was partially set in Beirut, decided not to film in the Lebanese capital due to the burgeoning political problems.

In 1965, UNESCO established the Arab Cinema Liaison Center at the National Cinema Center in Beirut as a regional hub for linking cinema activities across the Arab world. Beirut hosted the first international film festival in the Arab world in 1971. Until the mid-1970s, the film industry in Lebanon was flourishing with market appeal that extended to neighboring Arabic-speaking countries as the films included plenty of Egyptian film stars, such as Paris and Love in 1972, starring Salah Zulfikar and Sabah. Lebanon was producing "a string of sexually indulgent films" such as Cats of Hamra Street and The Guitar of Love in 1973, starring Georgina Rizk, the Lebanese beauty queen who won Miss Universe in 1971. In the 1970s, cinema attendance in Lebanon was the highest among Arabic-speaking countries.

Heiny Srour became not only the first Lebanese and Arab woman to have her film in competition at the 1974 Cannes Film Festival, but her documentary film The Hour of Liberation Has Arrived was actually the first film by any female filmmaker to be screened at the festival.

=== Civil War ===
Prior to the civil war, 161 films, mostly commercial melodramas, were produced in Lebanon and exported to various Arab countries, but when the civil war began, film production decreased tremendously.

Despite the war, there was an "emergence of a new wave of Lebanese filmmakers – fostering, unusually, equal numbers of women and men". The female filmmakers, who emerged during this period, made highly acclaimed and internationally renowned films. Some of the filmmakers who emerged during this period were "Maroun Baghdadi, Jocelyne Saab, Borhane Alaouié, Heiny Srour, Randa Chahal Sabag" and Jean Chamoun. In the 1970s, film themes in Lebanon were concentrated around the political conflicts that the country was undergoing. Displacement was also a recurrent theme as evident in Borhane Alaouie's Beirut, the Encounter (1981). Films of this period were characterized by a lack of closure, reflective of the seemingly endless war at the time.

One of the most important directors to emerge during this period was Maroun Baghdadi. According to Lina Khatib, author of Lebanese Cinema: Imagining the Civil War and Beyond, Baghdadi's films were "considered the cornerstone of Lebanese cinema". Maroun Baghdadi made Little Wars (1982) with aid provided by the American filmmaker, Francis Coppola. The film was screened in the Un Certain Regard section at the 1982 Cannes Film Festival. The film also screened at New York Film Festival on 2 October 1982.

Documentaries by filmmakers like Jocelyne Saab who "adopted a mainly journalistic style" also developed rapidly and successfully during this period. Lebanese and Palestinian documentaries produced in Lebanon during the 1970s caused a surge of documentary production across the Arab world. These documentaries contributed to the development of feature film production in the early eighties.

Many filmmakers from this era, such as Jocelyne Saab, Jean Chamoun, Randa Chahal Sabbag, and Maroun Baghdadi settled in France due to the prolonged conflict in Lebanon.

Beirut: The Last Home Movie is a 1987 documentary film that was directed by Jennifer Fox and shot on location at the historic Bustros mansion in Beirut. The documentary, which told the story of one of Lebanon's wealthiest families, was awarded the Excellence In Cinematography Award and won the Grand Jury Prize Documentary at the 1988 Sundance Film Festival.

Despite the war, Lebanon submitted a film for the first time for consideration for the Academy Award for Best Foreign Language Film when Promise of Love (1978) an Armenian-language film by Sarky Mouradian was submitted to the 51st Academy Awards for Best Foreign Language Film.

In addition to the wave of festival films and documentaries, a series of commercial films, mostly mimicking action B movies from Hollywood, were made in the early 1980s. Prominent directors such as Youssef Charafeddine and Samir El-Ghoussaini aspired for escapism in their films to take their audiences out of the context of the war. Films such as The Last Passage (1981), The Decision (1981), and The Leap of Death (1982) were popular because they depicted a society free of war where law and order actually existed. Other commercial films, like Ghazl Al-Banat, incorporated the war in the narrative. The era of commercial film production ended with the Israeli war on Lebanon.

=== Post-War Revival ===
After the war, Beirut reemerged as one of the centers of mass media production in the Arab world. While media production was concentrated around television, there were attempts to revive the film industry in Lebanon, especially by fresh graduates of Lebanese film schools. While filmmaking schools are a rarity in the region, by the mid-1990s, six of Beirut's universities were offering degrees in cinema and television and that attracted an influx of students from Arab countries who chose to receive some or all of their media training in Lebanon. Financing of film production in Lebanon in this period was mainly dependent on foreign support, both European and from the Lebanese diaspora.

The civil war was a major theme for Lebanese filmmakers since 1975, and this trend continued in the early post-war era where films continued to be affected thematically by the war. Films made after the war had a common theme of returning to the war setting and dealing with trauma common to post-conflict societies.

Many films, such as Jocelyne Saab's experimental film, Once Upon a Time in Beirut, examined the destruction that was left after the war. Maroun Baghdadi's Beyrouth Hors la Vie won the Special Jury Prize at Canned in 1991. Other's like Jean-Claude Codsi's Histoire d'un retoure examined the issue of returning to the country after years of exile and war. In 1994, Codsi's film won the jury award at the Festival international du film Francophone de Namur in Belgium.

In 1997, Youssef Chahine's French-produced film, Destiny, was shot on location in Lebanon, including the historic mountain town of in Beiteddine.

While many films produced in the 1990s were hits at international festivals, Lebanese viewers were not drawn to the mainly war-themed films. An exception was West Beirut (1998), which was a local and an international hit. It was not only the first Lebanese film, but also the first Arabic-language film to have general release in America. The film, that received worldwide attention, was the first Lebanese film that the post-war generation in Lebanon actually saw in cinemas, and it ushered a new era in Lebanese filmmaking that historian, Lina Khatib calls a renaissance.

=== Renaissance in the 21st century ===
While there is no government initiatives and public sector support for cinema in Lebanon, the private sector with companies such as Abbout, Orjouane Productions, The Attic, Né à Beyrouth and Boo Pictures have created an ecosystem for independent film production, albeit dependent on regional funding and international co-productions, especially from Europe.

A mélange of local issues and Western aesthetics characterized this period of Lebanese filmmaking. Films in this period gained domestic appeal where many films were not only commercially successful as evident in box-office sales of Bosta, Caramel, Stray Bullet, and Where Do We Go Now? but also were able to compete with imported, American films. Funding of films remained reliant on European organizations, such as Fonds Sud Cinéma in France and Organisation Internationale de la Francophonie. Philippe Aractingi's Bosta is one of the few films that was completely funded locally.

==== 2000s ====
Ghassan Salhab's Terra Incognito (2002) screened in Un Certain Regard in Cannes. In 2003, Randa Chahal's The Kite examined the issue of families separated due to the occupied territories in southern Lebanon. Her film won the Silver Lion at the Venice Film Festival.

Also in 2003, Georges Schoucair returned to Lebanon after studying film in France and established Abbout Productions, the country's first post-war production house, which has become Lebanon's "foremost production house and one of the most prominent companies for art-house films in the region".

By 2004, film production was on the increase with four fiction and two documentaries produced. Joana Hadjithomas and Khalil Joreige's The Perfect Day (2005) examined the social implications of political kidnappings that happened during the war. Ghassan Salhab's The Last Man (2006) represented the cultural memory of the war from the eyes of a vampire protagonist caught in limbo between life and death. Zozo (2005) by Josef Fares follows the life of a young boy and his journey to flee the war to Sweden. New themes that did not necessary deal with the issue of war emerged, like Danielle Arbid's In the Battlefields (2005) that critiqued patriarchal society. Filmmakers began to examine the postwar context rather than living in or surviving the war. Michel Kammoun's Falafel (2005) about disillusioned youth in post-war Beirut premiered in 2006 at Cinema Days of Beirut, a festival which was not cancelled despite the Israeli bombardment of the capital as a sign of "cultural resistance".

Short film production, especially by the graduates of the film schools in Lebanon, was also on the increase and receiving local and international attention. Hany Tamba's After Shave won the César Award for best short film in 2006.

2007 was an important year for Lebanese filmmaking when two female directors, Nadine Labaki and Danielle Arbid presented their films at the Cannes Film Festival. Labaki presented Caramel while Arbid presented A Lost Man. A Lost Man is possibly the most sexually graphic film ever made by an Arab director. Caramel enjoyed an international release, including in the United States, United Kingdom, France, and Argentina.

==== 2010s ====
According to research conducted by Fondation Liban Cinema, "The film industry in Lebanon has seen a significant growth over the last four years, with 31 movies produced in 2014, compared to just four a decade ago." Ghassan Salhab's The Mountain, which was produced by Abbout Productions, had its international premiere during the Doha-Tribeca Film Festival.

===== 2010 =====
In 2010, 11 films were produced in Lebanon. Muriel Abourouss won the best director of photography award for Georges Hachem's Stray Bullet at the Festival international du film Francophone de Namur in Belgium. Vatche Boulghourjian filmed on location in Bourj Hammoud, The Fifth Column a short film in Western Armenian dialect that won the third place Cinéfondation Prize at the Cannes Film Festival.

Ok, Enough, Goodbye by Rania Attieh and Daniel Garcia was shot on location in Tripoli, Lebanon in 2010. The film tied with Delphine and Muriel Coulin's Ragazze for the Special Jury Award ex-aequo at the Torino Film Festival in 2011.

Also in 2010, Carlos, a Canal+ production that starred Édgar Ramírez as well as a handful of Lebanese stars such as Razane Jammal, Rodney El Haddad, Antoine Balabane, Ahmad Kaabour, Talal El-Jordi and Badih Abou Chakra was shot on location in Lebanon. Carlos, which screened out of competition at the 2010 Cannes Film Festival won the 2010 Golden Globe award for the Best Miniseries or Motion Picture Made for Television.

===== 2011 =====
Increase in film production was evident in 2011 with 24 movies produced. Nadine Labaki's Where Do We Go Now? won the Prix Francois Chalais at Cannes. The film also won the people's choice award at the Toronto International Film Festival as well as the audience award at the Films from the South Festival in Oslo, Norway. Sony Pictures Classics acquired the American rights to the film. The film was Lebanon's choice to compete in the Academy Award's "Best Foreign-Language Film" category. The film also won the Byarad d'Or at the Festival international du film Francophone de Namur in Belgium and the Doha Tribeca Film Festival's Best Narrative Film award.

Circumstance, a film by Maryam Keshavarz that explored homosexuality in modern Iran, was filmed entirely on location in Beirut.

In the summer of 2011, the city of Beirut participated in the 48 Hour Film Project for the first time where 24 teams competed. Cyril Aris won the Best Film category for his short, "Anoesis," which will be Beirut's entry in Filmapalooza 2012, the final festival for the 2011 48 Hour Film Project.

Danielle Arbid's filmed her third feature, Beirut Hotel, which had a world premiere at the 64th Locarno Film Festival in August 2011.

Mounir Maasri's Rue Huvelin, which was set in 1990, told the story of seven Saint Joseph University students from Beirut's Rue Huvelin during the Syrian occupation of Lebanon. Né à Beyrouth produced the film.

Jean-Claude Codsi filmed his second feature, A Man of Honor, which was produced by Michel Ghosn and premiered at the Doha Tribeca Film Festival on 28 October 2011.

Beirut Kamikaze, an Experimental/Documentary by Christophe Karabache was released in cinema (Paris) on 16 November 2011.

Also in 2011, Celine Abiad's Beiroots Productions presented a different perspective of Mediterranean filmmaking by producing and experimental surrealist film (5.1 Dolby surround), shot in 35mm and fully produced in Lebanon: A Play Entitled Sehnsucht, written and directed by Badran Roy Badran. The film was picked up for international distribution at Cannes, by Albany Films International, a company dedicated to the promotion of art house and indie films from gifted and promising directors.

Documentary filmmaking was also present in 2011. Rania Stephan won "Best Documentary Filmmaker" at the Doha Tribeca Film Festival for The Three Disappearances of Soad Hosny. It's All in Lebanon, a documentary film directed by Wissam Charaf and produced by Né à Beyrouth Production, premiered at DIFF in 2011. Hady Zaccak's Marcedes screened at the Marché du Film. It received several awards, including Best Documentary at the International Federation of Film Critics at the Dubai International Film Festival and the Al-Jazeera Documentary Channel Award for Best Long Film at Al-Jazeera International Documentary Festival.

Thirteen feature and short films were premiered at DIFF in 2011, including Danielle Arbid's Beirut Hotel, Youcef Joe Bou Eid's Tannoura Maxi, Daniel Joseph's Taxi Ballad, Simon El Habre's Gate #5, Hady Zaccak's Marcedes, Rami Nihawi's Yamo, Christina Foerch Saab's Che Guevara Died in Lebanon, Tamara Stepanyan's 19 February, Wajdi Elian's A Place to Go, Rodrigue Sleiman and Tarek El Bacha's Nice to Meet You, Aseel Mansour's Uncle Nashaat, and Nadim Mishlawi's Sector Zero.

===== 2012 =====
Steady increase in film production continued with 25 films produced in 2012. Lara Saba completed her second feature, Blind Intersections. Despite being critically acclaimed, Ziad Doueiry's film, The Attack was banned in Lebanon because it was filmed on location in Israel. 74, La reconstitution d'une lutte, a docu-fiction by Raed and Rania Rafei, recreates the student occupation of the American University in Beirut 1974.

===== 2013 =====
The number of films produced in 2013 were 24. Amin Dora's Ghadi, which was released in late 2013, became Lebanon's entry to the Oscars's Foreign Language category and later won the KNN Award (Audience Award) at the Busan International Film Festival. Philippe Aractingi completed and released his documentary feature film, Heritages.

===== 2014 =====
The number of films produced in Lebanon jumped to 31 films in 2014, and this also reflected an increase in the number of production companies, including 27 focusing only on films. One of the most prominent films of the year was Void, written by George Khabbaz and directed by seven different directors, all of them graduates of Notre Dame University, and the film would be selected as Lebanon's entry to compete at the Oscars in 2015. Ghassan Salhab reunited with actors Carlos Chahine and Carole Abboud in The Valley, which premiered at the Toronto International Film Festival. The Valley was shot on 35 mm.

===== 2015 =====
There were 31 produced films in 2015, growing 675% since 2004.

In 2015, Noura Kevorkian's drama-documentary hybrid feature film 23 Kilometres was selected for documentary competition at Karlovy Vary International Film Festival as well as Muhr Award for feature film at Dubai International Film Festival.

Amber Fares' 2015 documentary Speed Sisters won the Feature Documentary award at the Adelaide Film Festival in Adelaide, South Australia.

Ely Dagher's short film Waves '98 premiered in Official competition at the Cannes film festival and won the short film Palme d'or.

===== 2016 =====
Two government initiative were passed in 2016 that benefited the film industry. The first was the memorandum of understanding (MOU) signed by the Fondation Liban Cinema and the Investment Development Authority of Lebanon (IDAL) which added the media industry, including film production, to IDAL's mandate of bringing investment to the country and offering incentives such as 100 percent tax exemption on corporate profits for up to 10 years. The other initiative was Banque du Liban's offering of $100 million in loan guarantees at the low interest rate of 1 percent. Banque du Liban also issued Intermediate Circular 416, which subsidizes loans of up to $3 million by banks and financial institutions to support film, television and theatrical productions

In 2016, Solitaire, Sophie Boutros's first feature film, premiered at the 13th Dubai International Film Festival and Philippe Aractingi's feature film, Listen was also screened at Dubai Film Festival's Arabian Nights.

A Maid for Each, a documentary by Maher Abi Samra about domestic servants in Lebanon, won the Peace Film Prize at Berlin Film Festival and Post-Production Awards at Final Cut in Venice 2014.

One of the biggest hits of 2016 was the film, What About Tomorrow? a restoration of old 8mm footage of Ziad Rahbani's 1978 play. The film chattered box office records in Lebanon.

===== 2017 =====
In February 2017, Mary Jirmanus Saba's debut feature A Feeling Greater Than Love received the FIPRESCI International Critics Prize at the Berlin International Film Festival Forum. Later that year, December 2017, Lucien Bourjeily's debut feature film Heaven Without People won the Special Jury Prize award at the Dubai International Film Festival while Vatche Boulghourjian's Tramontane was selected for Cannes' Critics' Week.

After being supported by the Venice Biennale College - Cinema Program, Martyr (2017) by Mazen Khaled premiered at the Venice Film Festival on 2 September 2017 where it was nominated for the Queer Lion Award. The film also screened at the SXSW Film Festival, where it was included in the festival's Global section. Breaking Glass Pictures acquired the film for American theatrical distribution and Peccadillo Pictures launched it in the UK.

The documentary, Taste of Cement (2017) by Syrian filmmaker Ziad Kalthoum was filmed in Lebanon with Lebanese director of photography Talal Khoury. It was nominated for many awards and won a few, including The Golden Key award at the Kassel Documentary Film and Video Festival, the International Competition at Visions du Réel, and the International Documentary Award at the Adelaide Film Festival. It also received a Cinema Eye Honors nomination.

Rana Eid's documentary, Panoptic, released in cinemas in 2018, premiered at the 2017 Locarno Film Festival and received a First Lights from the Jihlava Film Festival in the Czech Republic.

Among the 13 participating Arab countries, Lebanon had the most nominations at the Arab Film Institute's first edition of the Arab Film Awards. The films were: The Traveller by Hadi Ghandour, Jihane Chouaib's Go Home, Listen by Philippe Aractangi, Single, Married Divorced, a comedy by Shady Hanna, the romantic comedy Solitaire by Sophie Boutros, Roy Dib's The Beach House, and Tramontane by Vatché Boulghouroujian.

===== 2018 =====
With Oscar and Palme D'or nominations, 2018 marked a pivotal point for Lebanese cinema on the international stage.

In March, Ziad Doueiry's The Insult was nominated for an Academy Award for Best Foreign Language Film, the first for Lebanon.

Nadine Labaki's Capernaum, which was selected to compete for the Palme d'Or, earned a 15-minute standing ovation following its premiere on 17 May 2018 at the Cannes Film Festival. The film won the Jury Prize.

Tony Farjallah's Morine, a film about a 7th-century woman who disguises herself as a man in order to live in a monastery, is considered the first historical film set in Lebanon. Other films made were Michel Kammoun's Beirut Hold'em, Nadim Tabet's One of These Days, Rana Eid's documentary Panoptic and Joanna and Khalil Joreige's The Notebooks a co-production of Abbout Productions and France's Haut et Court.

===== 2019 =====
Nadine Labaki's Capernaum was nominated for a Best Foreign Language Film at the 76th Golden Globe Awards, making it the second Lebanese film in two years to be nominated for the Academy Award for Best Foreign Language Film and earning Lebanon back-to-back nominations in the category. The film was also nominated for Best Film Not in the English Language by the British Academy of Film and Television Arts and César Award for Best Foreign Film. Oualid Mouaness's debut fiction feature, 1982 won the NETPAC AWARD at TIFF , the FIPRESCI International Critics Prize at El Gouna Film Festival and went on to accrue several awards around the world since its Toronto International Film Festival premiere. 1982 was selected as Lebanon's submission for consideration in the best international feature film Oscar category. Ahmad Ghossein's first fiction feature, All This Victory won the top prize of the Critics' Week at the Venice Film Festival.

==== 2020s ====
Lebanon entered the new decade grappling with a severe financial and banking crisis, and despite its media industry being a hub for regional production over the past 80 years, the collapse nearly wiped out the revenues sustaining much of the sector, prompting a new wave of Lebanese talent to seek opportunities abroad, particularly in Saudi Arabia where new initiatives were launched. Despite financial challenges, independent filmmakers persevered, and film production thrived, with films making a significant impact both locally and internationally, premiering at major festivals such as Beijing, Berlin, Cannes, Rotterdam, Toronto, Tribeca, and Venice.

By the mid-2020s, Lebanese cinema was smaller and more financially fragile than during its postwar and 2010s high points, and far less industrially developed than regional giants such as Egypt, but it remained disproportionately influential internationally through independent filmmaking, festival circulation and international co-production.

===== 2020 =====
Lebanon’s financial crisis created great economic pressures on its media and creative industries, reducing revenues and making independent cultural production increasingly dependent on external funding.

Jimmy Keyrouz's Broken Keys, his first feature film and Danielle Arbid's Passion Simple were part of the 2020 Official Selection of the Cannes Film Festival. Brokey Keys was submitted to represent Lebanon in the Best International Feature Film category at the 93rd Academy Awards. The Franco-Lebanese film, Skies of Lebanon by Chloé Mazlo was selected in the Cannes' Critics' Week.

We Are From There, a feature documentary by Wissam Tanios, premiered at the International Film Festival Rotterdam (IFFR). We Are From There also won the Saad Eldin Wahba Award for best non-fiction film at the Horizons of New Arab Cinema Competition at the Cairo International Film Festival while another Lebanese film, Under the Concrete by Roy Arida won the Saad Eldin Wahba Award for best fiction film.

Karim Kassem's Only the Winds was selected for the 50th International Film Festival Rotterdam and nominated for the Sesterce d'or Canton de Vaud at Visions du Réel and the Tanit d’Or at Carthage Film Festival.

The feature film Mafkoud, which was directed by Bachir Abou Zeid, was released in 2020 across the Arab world.

In 2020, Netflix established a film and television emergency fund in collaboration with the Arab Fund for Arts & Culture (AFAC) to support in the form of individual grants Lebanon's film and TV industries.

===== 2021 =====
Lebanese cinema continued to expand international and regional financing, despite the industry's lack of public funding and the country's continuing political and economic crises.

Memory Box, written and directed by Joana Hadjithomas and Khalil Joreige, which had its worldwide premiere at the 71st Berlin International Film Festival in March 2021, competed for the Golden Bear and Eliane Raheb's Miguel's War screened in the Berlinale Panorama section where it was up for the audience award and took second prize. Death of a Virgin and the Sin of Not Living, the first feature by George Peter Barbari, also premiered in the Berlinale Panorma section.

Ely Dagher's The Sea Ahead premiered at Cannes during the festival's Directors' Fortnight. Daizy Gedeon's documentary, Enough — Lebanon's Darkest Hour, screened at the Cannes Market and received the "Movie That Matters Award" sponsored by Film festivals and in association with Better World Fund.

Mounia Akl's first feature film Costa Brava Lebanon, starring Nadine Labaki, premiered at the Horizons Extra section of the 78th Venice International Film Festival. Its North American premier was at TIFF where it won the NETPAC award. The film also won the FIPRESCI award and the Green Star award for tackling environmental issues at El Gouna Film Festival. The film also won the Audience Award at the 65th edition of the BFI London Film Festival.

In addition to Costa Brava Lebanon, Memory Box and The Sea Ahead also screened at BFI London Film Festival.

Oualid Mouaness's 1982 won the Prix Cannes Ecru's Juniors 2021 at the Cannes Film Festival youth sidebar Cannes Cinéphiles. Additionally, it won the UNICEF PRIZE 2021 in Switzerland.

Elie Khalifé's State of Agitation premiered at the Mostra de Valencia, cinema del mediterrani, and screened at the Malmö Arab Film Festival.

Ghassan Sahlab's The River, which is the last film of the trilogy after The Mountain (2010) and The Valley (2014), premiered at the 74th edition of the Locarno International Film Festival.

Karim Kassem's Octopus won the International Documentary Film Festival Amsterdam Award for Best Film in the Envision Competition, and a jury special mention award at ZagrebDox 2022, in addition to nominations for best cinematography at the IDA Awards and for best film at Torino Film Festival.

===== 2022 =====
Netflix released its first Arabic original film, Perfect Strangers, starring Nadine Labaki and directed by Lebanese director Wissam Smayra

"Warsha" a short film by director Dania Bdeir won the Short Film Jury Award at Sundance.

Nadim Mishlawi's documentary feature film, After the End of the World, premiered at Sheffield DocFest, one of the top three documentary festivals in the world.

Wissam Charaf's Dirty Difficult Dangerous screened at the Venice Film Festival, where it won the Europa Cinemas Label and at Palm Springs International Film Festival where it won the Bridging the Borders Award

1982 by Oualid Mouaness was released theatrically in Mexico, Brazil, Hong Kong, Germany, Canada, and lastly, the United States in June 2022 to critical acclaim. It screened at independent cinemas in over fifty US cities and had an extended run of eight months that ended in March 2023.

Batata, a documentary film by Noura Kevorkian, won the 83rd Peabody Winners for Documentary.

===== 2023 =====
In 2023, Lebanese cinema remained active despite the country’s severe economic crisis, with filmmakers continuing to develop and produce projects while new funding initiatives, including the Lebanese Film Fund, provided financial support to local productions.

Carlos Chahine's feature La nuit du verre d'eau was released in 2023 in Lebanon and France.

Several documentaries came out in 2023, including Q by Jude Chehab that had its world premiered at Tribeca Film Festival Cyril Aris' documentary film, Dancing on the Edge of a Volcano had its world premiere in the Main Competition at the Karlovy Vary International Film Festival.

Karim Kassem's Thiiird world premiered in the Tiger Competition at IFFR 2023, and won best international feature film at Beldocs IDFF in the same year. It was then nominated for the Jean-Loup Passek award (MDOC) and selected to show at the Diriyah Contemporary Art Biennale.

L'Orient Today described 2023 as a competitive year for Lebanese cinema, marked by the return of the Lebanese Movie Awards.

“Les Chenilles”, the debut direction of Lebanese sister duo filmmakers Michelle and Noel Keserwany, won the Golden Bear for Best Short Film at the 73rd Berlin Film Festival.

“Sisters of the Rotation” by Gabriel and Michel Zarazir were selected into several Oscar-qualifying festivals, including premiering at South by Southwest and screening at Palm Springs ShortFest and the Guanajuato International Film Festival.

“Neo Nahda” by May Ziadé, a short experimental films that tackles queer and feminist histories in the region, screened in several festivals in 2023, including the Arab Women Artists Now Festival in London and MENA film festival in Vancouver.

At the end of 2023, Ireland submitted In The Shadow Of Beirut for the Oscars international feature race; the documentary feature, which was shot in the Sabra and Shatila refugee camps, was EP'd by Hilary and Chelsea Clinton and co-produced by Lebanese filmmaker Myriam Sassine and Beirut-based Abbout Productions.

===== 2024 =====
In 2024, Lebanese film production remained active despite severe economic and political instability and the Israel–Hezbollah conflict, with independent filmmakers continuing to produce films and participate in international festivals, while new cultural infrastructure such as Beirut's Metropolis Cinema helped sustain the country's independent film sector.

Myriam El-Hajj’s feature documentary Diaries From Lebanon, premiered at the 74th Berlin Film Festival in the Panorama section.

Honeymoonish, the first Kuwaiti film shot in Lebanon, was produced by Lebanese production company Eagles Films and directed by Lebanese filmmaker Elie El-Semaan.

Arzé, the debut feature by Mira Shaib, written and produced by Faissal Sam Shaib and Louay Khraish with producer Zeina Badran and starring Diamand Abou Abboud and Betty Taoutel, had its world premiere in Beijing and its North American premiere in Tribeca. The film was initially selected to premiere in the Official Competition of the 45th Cairo International Film Festival, but the festival was canceled due to the Gaza war. However, the film was selected again to have its Arab and African premeiere at the 2024 edition of the Cairo International Film Festival where Louay Khraish and Faissal Sam Shaib won the Youssef Sherif Rezkallah Award for Best Screenplay and Diamand Abou Abboud won Best Actress, which she also won at the Asian World Film Festival in Los Angeles.

Other films, include two documentaries: Green Line, by Sylvie Ballyot and We Never Left by Loulwa Khoury.

===== 2025 =====
The film sector continued to face financial and structural challenges, including difficulties in securing funding for independent productions and the effects of Lebanon's prolonged economic crisis.

Abbout Productions, the Beirut-based independent production company led by Georges Schoucair and Myriam Sassine, received the Raimondo Rezzonico Award at the 78th Locarno Film Festival for its role in shepherding numerous acclaimed Arab and Lebanese films into international circulation and supported a resilient network of artists and filmmakers committed to creating independent cinema despite challenging conditions.

Dead Dog, written and directed by Sarah Francis, produced by Lara Abou Saifan, edited by Zeina Bou Hosn, with music by Victor Bresse, had its world premiere at the International Film Festival Rotterdam

A Sad and Beautiful World by Cyril Aris premiered in the main competition of Venice Days at the Venice Film Festival, while Lana Daher’s Do You Love Me was featured in the Special Events section. A Sad and Beautiful World by Cyril Aris won The Venice Days People’s Choice Award.

BornStars, the directorial debut of Caroline Labaki, premiered in Lebanon on 18 September and was widely released across the country on more than 40 screens.

===== 2026 =====
In 2026, Lebanese cinema continued to maintain an international presence, with Lebanese and Lebanon-linked productions appearing in major international festivals.

The Day of Wrath: Tales from Tripoli, a documentary feature film by Rana Rafael and produced by Sabine Sidawi, had its world premiere at 76th Berlin International Film Festival. Marie-Rose Osta, also at Berlinale, won the Golden Bear for Best Short Film for her short "Someday, a Child."

Rakan Mayasi, a Palestinian filmmaker based in Beirut, premiered his film Yesterday the Eye Didn’t Sleep, shot in Lebanon’s Bekaa Valley, in the Un Certain Regard section at the Cannes Film Festival. Lebanese artist and filmmaker Ali Cherri presented his short film "The Sentinel" in a special screening at Critics’ Week during the Cannes Film Festival.

The documentary film Never Stop, released in May 2025 features cyclist Samer Abouhamad in his 74,000-kilometer bikepacking odyssey, covering 20 countries including Tajikistan, Afghanistan, Oman, Saudi Arabia, Jordan, Syria, and Lebanon.

Nadim Tabet's supernatural thriller In This Darkness I See You, which was co-written with Antoine Waked and Jamal Belmahi, had its world premiere at Beyond Fest, the genre film festival in Los Angeles.

Furies, a 2026 Lebanese-Brazilian crime drama film, directed by Rami Kodeih, premiered at the 83rd Venice International Film Festival in the Venezia Spotlight section in 2026. It had its North American premiere at the 2026 Toronto International Film Festival in the Centrepiece section. The film was selected to represent Lebanon in the Best International Feature Film category at the 2027 Academy Awards.

== Films ==
- List of Lebanese films, a comprehensive list of Lebanese films
- List of Lebanese submissions for the Academy Award for Best International Feature Film

== Film Institutes ==
- Beirut DC
- Cinémathèque nationale du Liban
- Fondation Liban Cinema
- Metropolis
- Screen Institute Beirut

== See also ==
- Arab cinema
- Cinema of Egypt
- Cinema of the Middle East
- Cinema of the world
- Television in Lebanon
- List of banned films > Lebanon
