= Diamand Abou Abboud =

Lebanese actress

- Born: Beirut, Lebanon
- Education: Lebanese University
- Occupation: Actress
- Years active: 2001–present
- Spouse: Hany Adel (m. 2021)

Diamand Abou Abooud is a Lebanese actress, working in Europe and the Arab world, specifically Lebanon and Egypt.

== Early life and education ==
Diamand Abou Abboud studied drama at the Lebanese University's Institute of Fine Arts, Department of Theater, Cinema & Television.

== Career ==
Diamand Abou Abboud began her career in 2001 after being cast in the period TV series, The Search for Saladin. She appeared in several Lebanese movies and series, including helmer Samir Habchi's Beirut Open City and the Pan-Arab hit drama, Ruby, starring Amir Karara, Cyrine Abdelnour, Maxim Khalil, and directed by Rami Hanna. In 2013, she joined an all-star cast in Mahmoud Hojeij's Stable Unstable, playing the role of Anna, for which she won the Murex d'Or.

Abou Abboud came into international prominence after starring in Ziad Doueiri's The Insult, which screened in the main competition section of the 74th Venice International Film Festival and was selected as the Lebanese entry for the Best Foreign Language Film, after which the film was nominated for the Oscar at the 90th Academy Awards.

In 2017, she starred, alongside Hiam Abbass, in Belgian director Philippe Van Leeuw's film In Syria.

In 2019, Abou Abboud starred in Eden, a European series directed by French filmmaker Dominik Moll.

Abou Abboud starred in Shahid's hit series The Fixer in 2020 and also starred in Netflix's first Arabic original feature, an all-star adaptation of Italian box office hit Perfect Strangers.

In 2022, she starred alongside Egyptian actresses Menna Shalabi and Elham Shahin in Shahid's Ramadan series, Bitlou' Al Rouh, which was directed by Kamla Abou Zekry.

In 2024, she starred in Arzé, the comedy-drama directed by Mira Shaib in her feature directorial debut. The film was selected in the Main Competition of the 45th Cairo International Film Festival, but the festival was canceled due to the Gaza war. The film had its world premiere in Beijing and its North American premiere in Tribeca.

She also starred in Samir El Habashy's Hassan Al Masry, an Egyptian film also starring Ahmed Hatem.

== Personal life ==
Abou Aboud is married to Egyptian singer and actor Hany Adel.

== Filmography ==
†	Denotes films that have not yet been released

=== Film ===
Year	Title	Role	Director	Notes
2024	Arzé†	Arzé	Mira Shaib	BJIFF, Tribeca, CIFF.
2023	Hassan Al Masry	Joelle	Samir El Habashy	Released October 2023
2022	Electra, My Love	Electra	Hisham Bizri	Premiered at the Hollywood Arab Film Festival
2022	Perfect Strangers	Jana	Wissam Smayra	Netflix
2017	The Insult	Nadine	Ziad Doueiri	Premiered at the 74th Venice International Film Festival
2017	In Syria	Halima	Philippe Van Leeuw	Premiered at the 67th Berlin International Film Festival
2013	Stable Unstable	Anna	Mahmoud Hojeij	Premiered at Dubai International Film Festival
2013	Void		Maria Abdel Karim	The Lebanese Movie Awards Best. Actress in a Leading Role
2011	Tannoura Maxi	La Danseuse	Joe Bou Eid	Premiered at the Dubai International Film Festival
2010	Here Comes the Rain	Nadia	Bahij Hojeij	Premiered at the Brussels International Independent Film Festival
2008	Beirut Open City		Samir Habchi	Premiered at Filmfest Hamburg in 2009

=== Television ===
Title	Role	Director	Notes
The Board		Hozan Akko	Streamed on OSN+
Bi Tlou' el Rouh		Kamla Abou Zekry	Streamed on Shahid
Amnesia		Rodney Haddad	
Fixer	Sarah	Mark Eid	Streamed on Shahid
Beirut 6:07			Streamed on Shahid
The Sculptor		Majdi Smiri	
Eden	Maryam	Dominik Moll	European production
Renegades	Habiba	Mahmoud Kamel	
Innocent, but...	Amal	Charbel Shedid and Samir Habchi	
Shahbandar's Daughter	Hind	HWael Abo-Shaar and Seif El-Dinne Al Soubai	
Zaffe: Parade		Hani Khashfeh	
Ruby	Sherine	Rami Hanna	Aired on MBC 4
The Search for Saladdin		Najdat Esmail Anzur & Mohamed Zuhair Ragabl	

== Accolades ==
Diamand Bou Abboud won best actress prize at the Lebanese Movie Awards as well as a Murex d’Or for best actress for her role in the 2013 film, Void.
