= Betty Taoutel =

Lebanese actress

- Born: Beirut, Lebanon
- Education: Saint-Joseph University of Beirut (USJ)
- Occupation: Actress
- Years active: 1998–present

Betty Taoutel is a Lebanese actress, born in Beirut, playwright, and director of theatre, film, and television productions.

== Career ==
Taoutel wrote and directed numerous plays such as The Last House in Gemmayzé, Passport No. 10452, Crime Scene, and The Wednesday in the Middle of the Week. Her play, The Wednesday in the Middle of the Week, which was inspired by one of the most important social events in Lebanese society, the wedding, ran for several weeks in the Théâtre Monnot in Beirut.

Her play, Passport No. 10452, was presented in Arabic and French in 2013 as part of the Arab World Festival of Montreal and played in Lebanon, Greece, and South Africa.

Taoutel has starred in several Lebanese films, including Sophie Boutros' Solitare, which premiered at the Dubai International Film Festival. In 2022, she starred in Lara Saba's All Roads Lead To Rome, which had its world premiere at the Red Sea International Film Festival.

In 2024, she starred in Arzé, the comedy drama directed by Mira Shaib in her feature directorial debut. The film was selected in the Main Competition of the 45th Cairo International Film Festival, but the festival was canceled due to the Gaza war. The film had its world premiere in Beijing and its North American premiere in Tribeca.

On television, she became a household name when she became member of the jury on the LBCI pan-Arab hit, Star Academy.

She has also served on several festival juries, including the 41st edition of the Cairo International Film Festival in 2019.
