= Elie Mitri =

Lebanese actor (born 1980)

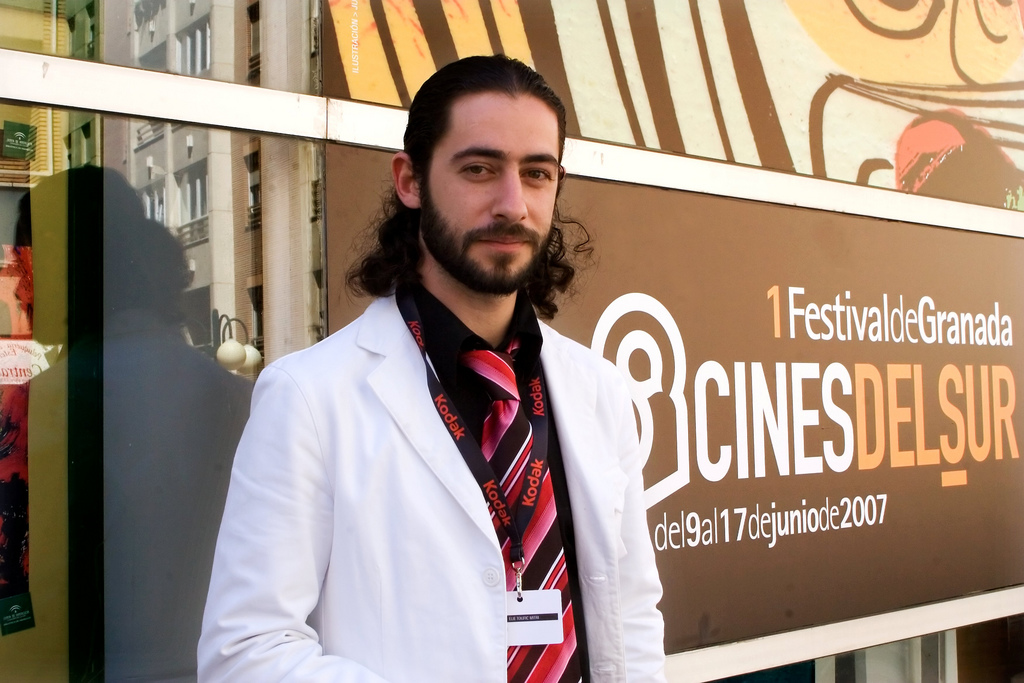
- Elie Mitri in the Cines del Sur Granada Film Festival, 2007
- Born: 26 January 1980 (age 46); Lebanon
- Occupation: Actor

Elie Mitri (born 26 January 1980) (Arabic; ايلي متري) is a Lebanese actor, writer and stand-up comedian.

== Film/TV ==
Mitri graduated from the Lebanese Academy of Fine Arts in 2003. In 2006, he gained public attention when he starred in Falafel, directed by Michel Kammoun, a film that follows a young man experiencing a series of nighttime events in Beirut, which attracted international notice. In 2009, he portrayed Saint Charbel Makhlouf in the biographical film Charbel: The Movie, offering a grounded depiction of one Lebanon’s Maronite saint. He later appeared as the romantic lead Karim in Habbet Loulou and May in the Summer, as the drug-addicted Cherif in Horoub: Escape (2012), and as Max in Max w Antar (2016), a comedy centered on a young man and his dog. Mitri also worked on several independent and commercial productions that engage with socio-political themes in Lebanon, including Chatti Ya Dinni, Void, and Mahroumin: The Deprived (2017).

Mitri co-hosted Crazy Science with Nancy Iskandar, an hour-long family program featuring chemistry demonstrations and science experiments, many of which were performed on Mitri himself. He later described the show as one of his proudest achievements, noting in an interview that its positive influence on children made the work especially meaningful.

== Theater ==
Year	Play
2012/3	Reasons to be pretty
2010	Sar lezim nehke (We Need to Talk)
2009	Alarms
2009	Al Nashid (The Anthem)
2006	Public WC
2003	Fire
2006	Oliver Twist
2002	Le Revisor

== Filmography ==
Year	Film	Role
2024	Arzé	Junkyard owner
2023	Mother Valley (Ard al-Wahm - La nuit du verre d'eau)	Alfred
2023	Al Kha’en	Salem
2018	El Maharaja	Supporting role
2016	Max w Antar	Max (lead)
2013	Void (Waynon)	The Son (Segment lead)
2013	Habbit Loulou	Tarek
2013	May in the Summer	Karim
2010	Here Comes the Rain (Chatti Ya Dini)	Elie
2008	Charbel: The Movie	Young Saint Charbel (lead)
2008	Amour D'enfants (Hobb al-Atfal)	Tony
2006	Falafel	Toufic (lead)

== Television ==
Year	Film	Role
2026	Mawlana	
2026	Bil Haram	
2025	Kahti'a Akhira (One Last Sin)	
2025	Nafas	Amin
2024	A'a Amal	Supporting role
2024	Daraja Daraja	
2023	Al Kha'en (The Traitor)	Salem
2023	Brando El Sharq	
2023	Arrabat Beirut	
2023	Anbar 6 2	
2023	Kasrat Qalb (Hard Broken)	Supporting role
2022	Shadow (Zell)	Supporting role
2021	Anbar 6	
2021	Al Bareea	
2021	Amnesia	
2021	Umm Badila	
2021	Ana	
2021	Al Zeyarah (The Visit)	Fares
2021	La Hukm Alayh (Not Guilty)	Wael
2020	Beirut 6:07	Joe
2020	Dentelle	Saad
2020	Al-Nahhat	
2019	Mas'let Wa't	
2019	Sanie Al-ahlam	
2017	Mahroumin	
2011	Horoub (Escape)	Supporting role
2009	Iza Al-Ard Medawara	
2008	Alttayir Almaksur (The Broken Bird)	Supporting role
