= Faissal Sam Shaib =

American screenwriter, director and producer

- Born: Beirut, Lebanon
- Education: University of Southern California, Master of Fine Arts; Miami International University, Bachelor of Arts
- Occupations: Screenwriter, film producer
- Years active: 2000–present
- Notable work: Arzé (2024); Wyrm (2019)

Faissal Sam Shaib is a Lebanese-American screenwriter and producer, known for the feature film, Arzé, Lebanon's submission to the 97th Academy Award.

== Early life ==
Faissal Sam Shaib was born in Beirut and moved to the U.S. when he was 17.

== Education ==
A founding student member of USC School of Cinematic Arts Council for Diversity and Inclusion, Faissal Sam Shaib graduated with a master in fine arts in 2017.

== Career ==
Faissal Sam Shaib produced the award-winning short film, "Wyrm" and was production manager on the feature Wyrm. He was also production manager on Disney+ A Spark Story and Netflix's Making a Murderer. He was manager of physical production at Participant in films as Shirley and We Grown Now.

He is known for Arzé the Lebanese feature film that he co-wrote and produced with Louay Khraish. The script was an Official Finalist in the First Time Screenwriter Competition at the 2018 Amsterdam Film Festival Van Gogh Awards. The film, which premiered at the 14th Beijing International Film Festival and had its North American premiere at Tribeca Festival, was a tribute to Lebanese women. The film was Lebanon's submission to the 97th Academy Award.

In 2019, he optioned Lolly Winston's Good Grief with Louay Khraish, and the script they wrote based on the novel was a finalists at the Austin Film Festival Script Competition.

He is currently producing Uttera Singh's debut feature.
