= Le dernier homme =

Le dernier homme may refer to:

- The Last Man (2006 film), a 2006 Lebanese film directed by Ghassan Salhab
- The Last Man (Mary Shelley novel), a novel by Mary Shelley first published in 1826
- Le Dernier Homme, an 1805 19th-century French novel written by Jean-Baptiste Cousin de Grainville
