= Georges Schoucair =

Lebanese film producer

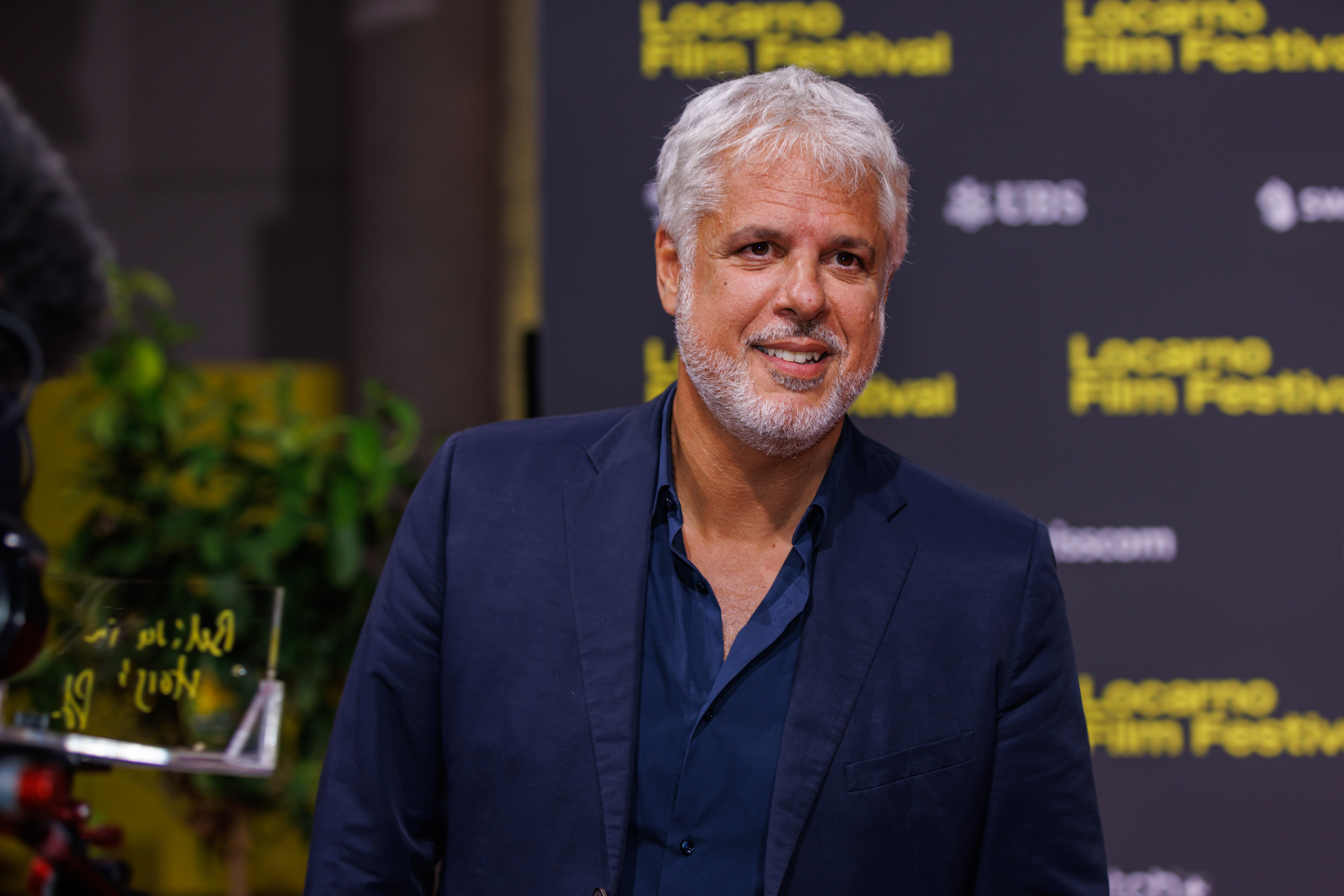
- Born: Georges Schoucair; Lebanon
- Occupation: Film producer
- Years active: 1991–present

Georges Schoucair is a prominent Lebanese film producer. Considered as one of the most promising film producers in the Middle-East cinema, Schoucair has produced several critically acclaimed and award-winning independent movies. He has actively contributed to the development of cinema in Lebanon as well as African cinema.

He is the founder and CEO of his own production house, 'Abbout Productions' founded in 2003. However, the company was originally established in 1998 by Joana Hadjithomas and Khalil Joreige. Apart from that, he is also the founder of Maskoon Fantastic Film Festival in Beirut, regarded as the first genre movie film fest in the Arab world.

== Career ==
As a producer, he worked with award-winning directors including: Kaouther Ben Hania, Vatche Boulghourjian, Jean Luc Godard, Alain Gomis, Joana Hadjithomas, Annemarie Jacir, Khalil Joreige, Mohammad Malas, Lucrecia Martel, Shirin Neshat, Asli Ozge, Rafi Pitts, Bill Plympton, Ghassan Salhab, Elia Suleiman and Apichatpong Weerasethakul.

Apart from Abbout Productions, Schoucair co-founded indie film company 'MC Distribution'. Since 2008, he is also the vice-president of the only art house cinema in Beirut: 'Metropolis'. He is considered as founding figure in indie film company 'Schortcut Films' in 2016 where he worked as the producer in many acclaimed films Félicité (2017), Wajib (2017), Rafiki (2018), Beauty & The Dogs (2018), It Must Be Heaven (2019) and A Son (2019).

== Filmography ==
Year	Film	Role	Genre	Ref.
2005	A Perfect Day	Co-producer	Film	
2006	The Last Man	Co-producer	TV movie	
2008	I Want to See	Producer	Film	
2008	Melodrama Habibi	Director	Film	
2009	1958	Producer	Film	
2010	Stray Bullet	Producer	Film	
2010	Yanoosak	Co-producer	Film	
2010	The Mountain	Producer	Film	
2011	Sector Zero	Producer	Film	
2011	Gate #5	Producer	Film	
2012	Impossible Exchange	Producer	Short film	
2012	The Lebanese Rocket Society	Producer	Documentary	
2013	Ladder to Damascus	Producer	Film	
2013	Stable Unstable	Producer	Film	
2014	The Valley	Producer	Film	
2015	Trêve	Producer	Documentary	
2015	Dégradé	Co-producer	Film	
2015	Cemetery of Splendor	Associate producer	Film	
2016	Apelo	Producer	Film	
2016	All of a Sudden	Co-producer	Film	
2016	Letters from War	Co-producer	Film	
2016	Soy Nero	Co-producer	Film	
2016	Tramontane	Producer	Film	
2016	Revengeance	Co-producer	Film	
2017	Mr. Stein Goes Online	Co-producer	Film	
2017	Félicité	Co-producer	Film	
2017	Nobody's Watching	Co-producer	Film	
2017	Beauty and the Dogs	Co-producer	Film	
2017	White Noise	Producer	Film	
2017	Salamat from Germany	Producer	Film	
2017	Hotel Al Naim	Producer	Film	
2017	El Gran Libano	Producer	Film	
2017	Wajib	Co-producer	Film	
2017	Zama	Co-producer	Film	
2017	Looking for Oum Kulthum	Co-producer	Film	
2017	Un certain Nasser	Producer	Documentary	
2017	One of These Days	Producer	Film	
2018	Rafiki	Co-producer	Film	
2018	The Image Book	Associate producer	Film	
2018	Empire Hotel	Co-producer	Film	
2019	Yalda, a Night for Forgiveness	Co-producer	Film	
2019	Initials SG	Producer	Film	
2019	The Unknown Saint	Associate producer	Film	
2019	It Must Be Heaven	Co-producer	Film	
2019	A Son	Director	Film	
2019	All This Victory	Producer	Film	
2019	1982	Producer	Film	
2021	Costa Brava, Lebanon	Producer	Film	
TBD	The Notebooks	Producer	Film	

== See also ==
- Cinema of Lebanon
