= Louay Khraish =

American screenwriter, director and producer

- Born: Ain Ebel, Lebanon
- Education: University of Texas at Dallas (Doctor of Philosophy); The New School, Master of Arts; University of North Texas, Bachelor of Fine Arts
- Occupations: Screenwriter; film producer; film educator
- Years active: 2000–present
- Notable work: Arzé (2024); Film Arabi (2018-19); Bayne el Wilayat

Louay Khraish is a Lebanese-American screenwriter, producer, and film educator, He is known for the feature film, Arzé, Lebanon's submission to the 97th Academy Award.

== Early life ==
Louay Khraish was born in Ain Ebel, Lebanon.

== Education ==
He earned his doctoral degree from the University of Texas at Dallas in 2009.

== Career ==
Louay Khraish began his television career as the producer of the Saudi weekly magazine program Bayn El Wilayat, which was filmed across nine U.S. states and explored the rich diversity of America's cultural heritage. He also developed content for the digital platforms at Baynounah Media Group in Abu Dhabi before moving back to New York City. In 2018, he produced for Film Independent the film education webseries, Film Arabi.

In 2019, he optioned Lolly Winston's Good Grief with Faissal Sam Shaib, and the script they wrote based on the novel was a finalist at the Austin Film Festival Script Competition.

He is known for Arzé the Lebanese feature film that he co-wrote and produced with Faissal Sam Shaib. The script was an Official Finalist in the First Time Screenwriter Competition at the 2018 Amsterdam Film Festival Van Gogh Awards. The film, which premiered at the 14th Beijing International Film Festival and had its North American premiere at Tribeca Festival, was a tribute to Lebanese women. The film was Lebanon's submission to the 97th Academy Award.

He has consulted on feature film scripts, such as Sophie Butros' Solitaire and Jonathan Keijser's Peace by Chocolate.

He has participated on juries at festivals, including the Guanajuato International Film Festival in Mexico, the Luxor African Film Festival in Egypt, and Image Nation's Arab Film Studio Awards. He has also moderated panels at festivals, such as the Cairo International Film Festival

He has written for online publications, such as Sukoon Magazine and Raseef22.

He has taught film and communication courses at the American University in Dubai, Manhattan College, and City College of New York, where he developed and taught a course on Contemporary Arab Cinema.
