= Takla Chamoun =

Lebanese actress (born 1966)

- تقلا شمعون فرج الله
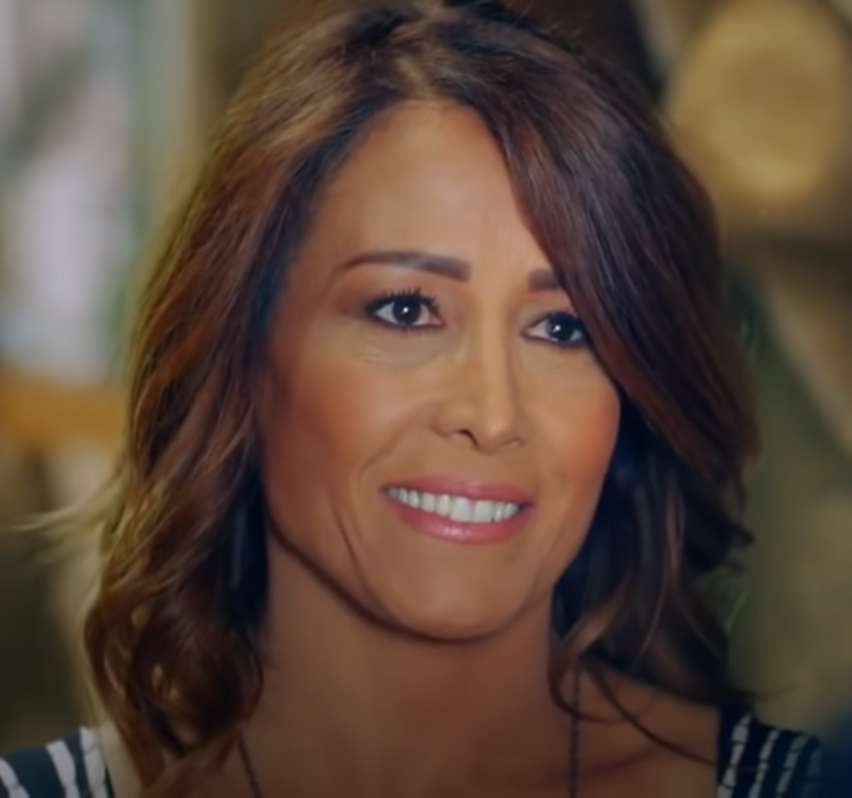
- Chamoun in 2014
- Born: 5 December 1966 (age 59); Jouar el-Haouz, Lebanon
- Occupations: Actress, producer
- Years active: 1991–present
- Spouse: Tony Farjallah

Takla Chamoun Farjallah (Arabic: تقلا شمعون فرج الله; born 5 December 1966) is a Lebanese actress, drama instructor, producer, and the co-founder and CEO of the Lebanese Film Academy. Chamoun is highly regarded in the Middle East and the Arab World for her acting and her ability to mold into a character.

== Early life and education ==
Takla Chamoun was born and raised in the mountainous village of Jouar el-Haouz to the east of Beirut. Her father Butros was a priest, and her mother a housewife. Chamoun is the middle child of nine siblings, six girls and three boys. She has said that she suffered from Middle child syndrome, and that she had a very close relationship with her mother. Her family was displaced twice, and she was almost taken out of school at the age of 15 because of the Lebanese Civil War; Chamoun recounted in a 2021 interview that she dissuaded her father from leaving her without an education.

The reclusive child was fond of journaling and spending the afternoons in the village sports club playing Table Football. It was not until after her participation in an amateur village play that she discovered her flair for acting. In the mid-1980s, Chamoun participated in a play organized by the village Christian Youth club to celebrate the beatification of Rafqa Ar-Rayes. The play was directed by George Oryan and attended by a large crowd, among whom was her future husband, Tony Farjallah.

Her father Butros did not stop her from pursuing an acting education and career. Chamoun joined the Lebanese University Faculty of Journalism before changing course to join the Faculty of Arts. She graduated with a Diploma in Theatre Acting & Directing from the Lebanese University.

== Career ==
=== Early career difficulties ===
At the start of her acting career, Takla played experimental theater roles before making her film debut. Her talent was spotted by producer Waleed al-Husseini during the premiere of Khodor Alaa Eddin's play Akh ya Baladna in the Picaddilly Theater in the Hamra district of Beirut. She was cast in the role of the wife of Palestinian caricaturist Nagi al-Ali in the eponymous 1991 movie, with legendary Egyptian actor Nour El-Sherif. Chamoun landed roles in the 1996 TV series Akher Mashhad (The last scene), and the controversial 1997 TV series Share' el-Kaslik (Kaslik Street), later renamed Share' al-iyyam (Days Street). Her breakout role was Zalfa the midwife in the Lebanese TV series Men Barsoumi (From Barsoumi) a 2001 14-episode historical miniseries, set in French-mandate Lebanon. Following her performance in Men Barsoumi, for which she garnered accolades, the actress continued to make regular appearances in popular films and series.

During the early 2000s, Chamoun took roles in poorly produced Lebanese TV series; she also worked in dubbing studios "to make ends meet", as she expressed in a 2007 interview; she also deplored the state of Lebanese theater. Her planned theatrical collaboration with renowned director Chakib Khoury dubbed al-Malja2 (The Shelter) was interrupted by the 2006 Lebanon-Israel conflict.

=== Later work ===
Chamoun cofounded the Lebanese Film Academy with her husband Tony Farjallah.

== Personal life ==
Takla claims to have had a heavy surgical anesthesia-induced near-death experience during her university graduation year at the age of 23. She recounted hearing the medical staff calling to her to wake up while she had an out-of-body experience. At the time, Takla was preparing her graduation thesis based on Eugène Ionesco's Exit the King. The incident, and Ionesco's work, deeply marked Takla. She began the introduction to her graduation thesis with the quotation "Takla Oumi" Wake up Takla; the same call she heard under anesthesia.

Chamoun is known to have refused to cancel a showing of Shakib Khoury's play Mawani' al-hanin (Harbors of Nostalgia) after she was informed of her mother's death from complications of surgery in 1999.

When Men Barsoumi aired, her future husband Tony Farjallah was infatuated with Chamoun and captivated by her performance; however, the two only met a few years later at Farjallah's cinematography workshop in Beirut. They got married shortly afterwards in the Greek Catholic Church in Sarba.

Chamoun describes herself as a nature lover and spends her free time hiking and rock climbing.

== Personal views ==
Chamoun supports women empowerment in the movie industry in the Middle East; she deplores actress body-shaming, ageism, and actresses' recourse to excessive plastic surgery. The actress also takes pride in not having compromised the quality of her work, and not using feminine sensuality for fame. She supported the Lebanese protests against sectarian rule, endemic corruption and political class ineptitude, she also said that revolution is long overdue.

== Filmography ==
=== Films ===
Year	Title	English title	Role	Director
1991	Nagi el-Ali		Nagi's wife	Atef El-Tayeb
2000	al-Jazira al-muharrama (The forbidden island)			Samir al-Ghusainy
2004	Ma`arek hobb	In the Battlefields	Marwa	Danielle Arbid
2007	Un homme perdu	A Lost Man	Taxi cab lady	Danielle Arbid
2009	Gibran	_	Mariana	Samir Habchi
2010	Rsasa taysheh	Stray bullet		Georges Hachem
2011	Beirut bel-leyl	Beirut Hotel	The seer	Danielle Arbid
2013	Waynon	Void	'Actress'	Multiple
2013	Habbet Loulou		Faten Abdallah	Layal M. Rajha
2013	24 ساعة حب (24 hours of love)			Liliane Boustany
2016	Saudade		Hanine	Doris Saba
2018	Morine - alqiddisa al mutanakkira	Morine	Rohel	Tony Farjallah
2019	Yerbo b`ezkon	C Section		David Oryan

=== Television ===
Year	Title	English title	Role	Director
1995	Rabih al-hob (The spring of love)			Milad al-Hachem
1996	Akher Mashhad (The last scene)			
1996	Shabab a banat (Boys and girls)			Bassem Nasr
1996	Awraq El Zaman El Murr		Nabila	Najdat Esmail Anzur
1997	Share' el-Kaslik (Kaslik Street)		Randa	Najdat Esmail Anzur
1997	Mada al-omor (For a lifetime)			Georges Ghayyad
1999	Rumh an-Nar (The spear of fire)			Najdat Esmail Anzur
2001	Men Barsoumi (From Barsoumi)			Elie Adabashi
2007	Maleh ya Baher (Oh salty sea)		Sonia	Liliane Boustany
2007	Laylat al-qarar (Decision night)			Charbel Kamel
2008	at-Ta'er al-maksour (The broken bird)		Gigi	Milad Abi Raad
2009	al-Burj 13 (Tower 13)		Souad	Caroline Milan
2009	Iza el-ard mdawra (If the earth is round)			Elie Adabashi
2009	Li annahu al-hob (Because it's love)			Elie Feghali
2010	Dahaya al-Madi (Victims of the past)			Tony Farjallah
2011	Casanova		Laudy	Philippe Asmar
2011	al-Jami`a (The university)		Dr. Layla	Amr Kora
2011	Hia wa hia		_	Liliane Boustany
2011	Scenario		The Hayena	Elie F. Habib
2012	Ruby	_	Alia	Rami Hanna
2012	Murahiqoon (Adolescents)			Saifeddin al-Subeihi
2013	Juthur (Roots)		Raja'	Philippe Asmar
2013	Sana`udu ba`s qalil		_	Al Laith Hajo
2014	`Ashrat `abid szghar	And Then There Were None adaptation	Laura	Elie F. Habib
2014	Ittiham (accusation)		Layla	Philippe Asmar
2014	Makan fi al-qasr (A place in the mansion)		Rima	Adel Adib
2014–2015	24 Qirat	24 Carats	Jihane	Al Laith Hajo
2016	Jarimat shaghaf (A crime of passion)		Mona	Walid Nassif
2016	Sarkhat ruh (A soul's cry) - season 4		Huda / Sahar	Samih Hussein
2017	Fakhamat as-Shakk (The luxury of Doubt)		Aida	Ussama Shehab al-Hamad
2018	Karma			Rodney El Haddad
2018	Sakat al-waraq (The papers fell silent)		Yasmin Farah	Nadim Mhanna
2018	Julia		Diana	Elie F. Habib
2018	Thawrat al-fallahin	Peasants' Rebellion	Narjis	Philippe Asmar
2019–2021	Arous Beirut	Bride of Beirut	Layla Daher	Fikret Kadioglu Emre Kabakusak
2021	As-Sununu (The swallow)			Khayri Beshara
2021	Az-Ziara	The Visit	Claire	Adolfo Martinez Perez
2021	al-Bari'a	The innocent	Fadia	Rami Hanna

=== Theater ===
Year	Title	Role	Director
1990?	Akh ya balanda		Khodor Alaa Eddin
1997	Shay' ma yushbihu al-hobb (Something like love)		
1999	Mawani' al-hanin (Harbors of Nostalgia)		Shakib Khoury
2008	`Awdat al-finiq (The return of the Phoenix)		Marwan Rahbani
2009	Akher ayyam	Colette Mattar	Marwan Rahbani
2016	al-Fares	The hostess	Marwan Rahbani
2020	Love & Light (orchestral theatrical concert)	Diana	Harout Fazlian

=== As producer ===
- Morine (2019)

== Honors and awards ==
- 2022 Beirut International Women Film Festival Tanit Award for life's work.
- 2021 Chamoun was granted the Golden visa from the government of the UAE. The Visa is awarded to outstanding professional artists.
- 2019 Murex d'Or for Best Lebanese Film to Morine, a film produced by Takla and her husband Tony Farjallah's Lebanese Film Academy.
- 2015 Lebanese Movies Award for Best Ensemble Cast In A Lebanese Motion Picture for the film Waynon; shared with Diamand Bou Abboud, Nada Abou Farhat, Carol Abboud, and Carmen Lebbos.
- 2013 Murex d'Or award for Best Lebanese TV and Cinema Actress.
