= Saad Hamdan =

Lebanese singer, actor and voice actor

- سعد حمدان
- Occupations: Singer, actor, voice actor
- Known for: Ghanoujet Baya as Adnan
- Saad Hamdan's voice

Saad Hamdan (Arabic: سعد حمدان) is a Lebanese singer, actor and voice actor. He is known for his role as "Adnan" in Ghanoujet Baya (2006).

== Filmography ==
=== Film ===
Year	Title	Roles	Notes	Source
2006	Ghanoujet Baya	Adnan		
2007	Tuff Incident			Voice only
2009	Beirut Open City			
2011	Alkhat		Short film	
2011	Khallet Warde	Abdullah		
2015	Princess of Rome		Voice only	
2016	Max w Antar			

=== Television ===
Year	Title	Role	Source
1998	Nadi Al Lugha Al Arabiya		
1999	Izz ad-Din al-Qassam	French commander	
2006	Ghanoujet Baya	Adnan	
2009	Ryah Al Thawra		
2010	Maitre Nada	Maitre Ayoub	
2011-2012	Al Ghaliboun		
2012	Al Kinaaa	Amin	
2012	Naji Attallah's Squad	Lebanese border guard	
2012	Duo El Gharam	Aziz	
2014	Melh Al Turab	Abu Al-Izz	
2014	Aarous w Aaris	Adnan	
2015	Darb Al-Yasamin		
2015	Ain El Jawza		

=== Dubbing roles ===
- 1001 Nights
- Assassin's Creed Syndicate
- Big Hero 6 - Fred
- Bolt - Rhino (Classical Arabic version)
- Deadly 60
- Dragon Hunters - Gwizdo
- Fix & Foxi and Friends - Pep
- Inside Out
- Ratatouille - Pompidou, Git (Classical Arabic version)
- Steven Universe - Greg, Lars, Ronaldo Fryman, Sour Cream
- Lego Nexo Knights - Axl
- Leroy & Stitch - Hämsterviel (Classical Arabic version)
- M.I.High
- Monsters University - Art, Frank McCay
- Prophet Joseph
- Sonic Boom - Doctor Eggman, Comedy Chimp
- The Looney Tunes Show - Marvin the Martian (Lebanese dubbing version)
- The Smurfs - Chef Smurf, Grouchy Smurf, Painter Smurf (Image Production House version)
- Teen Titans Go! - Ed (MBC 3 version)
- The Men of Angelos
- Tom Clancy's The Division
- Toy Story - Mr. Potato Head (Classical Arabic version)
- Toy Story 2 - Mr. Potato Head (Classical Arabic version)
- Toy Story 3 - Mr. Potato Head (Classical Arabic version)
- Treasure Planet - Delbert Doppler (Classical Arabic version)
- Up - newsreel announcer (Classical Arabic version)
