= Falafel (film) =

2006 Lebanese film by Michel Kammoun

- Directed by: Michel Kammoun
- Written by: Michel Kammoun
- Produced by: Roy films (Lebanon); Ciné-Sud Promotion
- Starring: Elie Mitri; Gabrielle Bou Rached; Said Serhan; Issam Bou Khaled; Michel El Hourany; Hiam Abou Chedid; Fadi Abi Samra; Rafic Ali Ahmad; Roger Assaf
- Cinematography: Muriel Aboulrouss
- Music by: Toufic Farroukh
- Release date: 2006
- Running time: 83 minutes
- Country: Lebanon
- Language: Arabic

Falafel (Arabic: فلافل) is a 2006 Lebanese film written and directed by Michel Kammoun. It world premiered on September 16, 2006, at the Ayam Beirut Festival. Falafel is Kammoun's first feature film, and was produced by Elle Kensington.

== Synopsis ==
The film is set on a summer evening in Beirut and follows the life of Toufic, a young Lebanese man, and his nightly strolls. Between his family, friends and love affairs, he tries to seize every day of his life, through pleasures and entertainment. For him, every second is the most important. Soon he discovers that having a normal life, in this country, is a luxury. 15 years after the war had ended, a volcano is lying dormant on every street corner, like a time-ticking bomb that is ready to explode. This night will be pivotal in the life of the young man.

== Cast ==
- Elie Mitri (Toufic)
- Gabrielle Bou Rached (Yasmin)
- Said Serhan
- Issam Bou Khaled (Abboudi)
- Michel El Hourany (Nino)
- Aouni Kawas (Jo)
- Hiam Abou Chedid
- Rafic Ali Ahmad
- Roger Assaf
- Fadi Abi Samra
- Maryann Capasso
- Nate Lord
- Gregory Funaro (Niru Meeting)
- Joanna Grigas
- Darren Greaney (the Green Machine)
- Christian Velud (himself)

== Reception ==
Deborah Young of Variety called it "An easy intro to new Lebanese cinema... chronicling the country's post-civil war emptiness with a light touch as it zaps between playful clowning and edge-of-violence darkness."

== Awards ==
- Golden Bayard for Best Film, Festival International du Film Francophone de Namur, Belgium 2006
- Golden Bayard for Best Music, Festival International du Film Francophone de Namur, Belgium 2006
- Silver Muhr for Best Film, Dubai International Film Festival, UAE 2007
- Audience Award - Lille International Film Festival, France 2007.
- Best First Film Award - Rotterdam Arab Film Festival, Nederland 2007.
- Art Award (Best First Film Award) - Alexandria International Film Festival, Egypt 2007.
- Bronze Dagger for Best Film, Muscat International Film Festival, Oman 2008
- Special Jury Prize, International First Film Festival Annonay, France 2008.
- Palmera de Bronce, Mostra de València, Spain 2007
