= Stray Bullet (2010 film) =

2010 Lebanese movie

- Directed by: Georges Hachem
- Written by: Georges Hachem
- Produced by: Georges Schoucair
- Starring: Badih Bouchakra; Takla Chamoun; Nadine Labaki; Hind Taher; Nazih Youssef
- Cinematography: Muriel Abourrousse
- Music by: Nadim Mishlawi
- Distributed by: Abboutt Productions
- Release date: November 2010
- Running time: 77 minutes
- Country: Lebanon
- Language: Arabic

Stray Bullet (Arabic: رصاصة طايشة; translit. Rsasa Taysheh), the first long feature film by Lebanese director Georges Hachem, is a 2010 Lebanese film, starring Lebanese actress Nadine Labaki.

== Plot ==
It's the end of summer in 1976, in a northern suburb of Beirut, and the war seems to be over. A priest announces the upcoming marriage of Jean Freiha and Noha Elias, who is 30 years old. After mass, she is congratulated by Olga, the aunt of her ex-boyfriend, Joseph Maroun, from three years earlier. Olga is also upset that Noha hadn't invited her to her wedding. Noha confides to her friend Wadad that she had secretly called Joseph and arranged a meeting with him. Joseph's mother had stalled any plans between the two as Noha is older than Joseph.

His mother, unaware of Noha and Joseph's arrangement, tells him to visit his sister, who has recently had a miscarriage. Noha is at her dress fitting. Her dress was purchased by her older sister, Layla, for her own wedding. Her boyfriend, Melhem, had given her an ultimatum, to elope or break up. Not wanting to bring shame to her family by eloping, Layla ended her relationship. Noha doesn't want to wear the dress, believing it to bring bad luck.

Joseph goes to Noha's house to meet her, but she avoids him. She watches Joseph from a balcony, as he hesitates to knock on the front door, and then leaves. Noha waits on the street outside her house and Joseph returns to go on a drive together. They discuss his friend Asmar, with whom Joseph had earlier gone hunting. Noha tells Joseph about her meeting with Olga, and Joseph mentions that Olga hadn't spoken to his mother since his mother had kicked out Noha. Noha tells Joseph that she is planning to get married in Harissa, and that she is planning to call off her wedding. They steal glances at each other as they sit in silence, driving to a forested area. Noha embraces Joseph in the car, and he kisses her, but she starts crying. She tells him that she shouldn’t have called him, that she was scared, and that she still loved him. He seems unaffected by her statement and she confronts him for not standing up for her. She realizes that she doesn’t want to get married or be anybody’s wife, exits the car, and starts walking back by herself.

While resting, she witnesses two masked men dragging a kidnapped person in a sack, through the forest. The person is shot by an unmasked woman. Joseph hears the shot and runs to Noha, but is seen by the masked men and searched. They interrogate him and ask if he is alone. He is from Sad El-Bauchrieh, a city near Jdeideh, and not an insurgent, but merely a carpenter. He tells them that he is alone, sheltering Noha. They order him to get back in his car and drive in front of them to an undisclosed location, while Noha watches them leave from her hiding place.

Arriving late from having walked home, her mother is upset with her, as that night they are expected at the house of her younger brother, Assaf, for a small engagement party. Her young nieces, Camelia and Mony, are her bridesmaids, but confide to Noha that they don’t like Jean and are scared of the way he laughs. They are unhappy because Noha was to be their 5th grade teacher that coming year, but won’t be able to teach once she’s married. They tell her they wish she wasn’t getting married.

While at their house, one of the guests mentions how her own brother had been kidnapped and they had to bargain for his remains to be return so he could be buried. The nieces say hello to Jean but avoid getting near him. Jean tells the girls he has brought presents, and only the ones who give him a thank you kiss will receive a present, but the girls don’t move from their mother’s side. Their father force the girls to give their uncle and kiss and thank him for the gifts. Noha sticks up for the girls but their father continues to force them. After giving their uncle a kiss, they start crying and are sent away. However, the girls merely hide behind the doorway.

The adults proceed to discuss the war and the battles they had participated in, while the young girls listen in secrecy. The debate gets heated, as everyone starts taking sides and mentioning atrocities. The unmasked woman from the car is the guest at Noha’s engagement party, who had to bargain for her brother’s remains, and Noha mentions that killing a kidnapped person in a sack in the woods is an atrocity, looking directly at the woman.

Noha starts throwing up during dinner, and goes to bed early. She wakes up later after the guests leave, and tells her sister, Layla, that she wants to cancel the wedding and become a spinster like Layla. Layla tells Noha that her friend, Wadad, had told Layla that Noha had been with Joseph. Assaf, their controlling brother, overhears and demands to know who Noha had been meeting with. He assaults Noha and grabs her hair as she tries to escape, dragging her through the house. Noha’s mother tells Assaf to stop and Noha confronts him about his controlling behavior. Noha tells her brother his hands are murderous. Noha confronts Layla, and Assaf realizes that Noha had been meeting with Joseph. Assaf kicks Noha out of the house and disowns her. Her mother goes after her, as does Layla, but their mother tells Layla to say back.

Noha walks to the forested area, followed by a pack of dogs. She sees her mother, who had been following her, who proceeds to sit on a bench near the hidden Noha, and cries. Shots ring out, and one of the dogs near Noha is shot. Noha goes to her mother, and realizes she has been killed after being shot in the neck by a stray bullet. Her screams are combined with the howls of the other dogs.

Noha’s mother’s funeral is held. After that day, a good day never followed. Noha is now hospitalized after suffering a breakdown and faring poorly. A nun, Sister Nawal, working as a nurse in the hospital, tells Layla that a visitor had come on behalf of her to visit Noha, and that his surname was "Maroun". Layla is surprised, and Sister Nawal reveals that Joseph had stayed for two minutes, and then had broken down. Noha had not recognized him and he had cried his eyes out. Layla blames Joseph for Noha’s being hospitalized. Assaf, having learned that his mother had been killed, banged his head against the wall exclaiming that it was all his fault. Assaf and his wife had a son 10 months later, but Noha never met the child. Noha no longer knows anyone.

It is revealed by Layla that their house was later one of the first to be bombed. Assaf fled with his family to Cyprus, and Layla had fled with them. Their house burnt down and nothing remained. Ironically, only Noha’s dowries survived the bombing.

The film ends with Noha crying, grasping a lace suit inherited from her mother, and Sister Nawal comforting her.

== Cast ==
- Nadine Labaki as Noha
- Badih Bou Chacra as Assaf
- Nazih Youssef as Jean
- Takla Chammoun as Layla
- Rodrigue Sleiman as Joseph Maroun
- Inaam Germanos as Noha's mother

== Production ==
Hachem wrote Noha's role as part of a challenge to meet the requirements for acting by Labaki. The movie was shot using Super 16 mm film to correspond to the grainy quality of the 70's movies.

== Reception ==
Stray Bullet was screened in many festivals during 2010, and enjoyed good reception. Among the festivals:

- Dubai International Film Festival
- Cairo International Film Festival
- Toronto International Film Festival
- London Film Festival
- Medfilm Festival, Rome

== See also ==
- Cinema of Lebanon
