= Ali Al-Zein =

Lebanese actor and voice actor (born 1949)

- Born: 1949 (age 76–77); Aali en Nahri, Beqaa, Lebanon
- Occupations: Actor, voice actor
- Relatives: Ahmad Al-Zein (cousin)

Ali Al-Zein (Arabic: علي الزين; born 1949) is a Lebanese actor and voice actor.

== Filmography ==
=== Film ===
- Beirut Open City. 2008

=== Television ===
- khamsa wnos. 2019
- thawani. 2019
- wein kenty 2. 2017
- wein kenty 1. 2016
- Ain El Jawza. 2015
- Bab Almorad. 2014
- The Third Man. 1985
- From Day to Day. 1983
- Shahrzad's Nights. 1980
- Izz ad-Din al-Qassam
- Miscreants' Time - Abu Ali

=== Dubbing roles ===
- Mokhtarnameh - Ibn Huraith
- Prophet Joseph - Ninifer Kibta
- Saint Mary
