= G for Gap =

2024 film directed by Long Fei

- Theatrical release poster
- Simplified Chinese: 走走停停
- Literal meaning: Stop and Go
- Hanyu Pinyin: Zǒu zǒu tíng tíng
- Directed by: Long Fei
- Written by: Huang Jia
- Produced by: Chen Lizhi; Yue Yang
- Starring: Hu Ge; Gao Yuanyuan; Yue Hong; Zhou Yemang; Jin Jing; Gan Yunchen; Liu Jun
- Cinematography: Chen Jun
- Edited by: Zhang Zhao
- Music by: Gao Xiaoyang
- Production companies: Matt Films (Hubei); China Film Group Corporation
- Distributed by: Shanghai Taopiaopiao Film and Television Culture; Alibaba Pictures
- Release dates: April 19, 2024 (BJIFF); June 8, 2024 (China)
- Running time: 103 minutes
- Country: China
- Language: Mandarin
- Box office: US$14.4 million

G for Gap (Note: also known as Gold or Shit) (Chinese: 走走停停) is a 2024 Chinese comedy-drama film directed by Long Fei. It follows Wu Di (Hu Ge), who returns to his hometown disheartened after years of failure in Beijing, only to face more struggles until an unexpected reunion with his high school classmate Feng Liuliu (Gao Yuanyuan) changes his life. The film premiered at the 14th Beijing International Film Festival on 19 April 2024, and was theatrically released on 8 June 2024.

== Plot ==
Wu Di, a fragile man disheartened by setbacks in both work and love, returns to his hometown feeling dejected. His sudden return disrupts the once-peaceful life of his family, forcing him to navigate the complexities of close-knit family interactions while searching for new possibilities for his future. After facing multiple struggles in reality, an unexpected encounter with his high school classmate Feng Liuliu presents a chance meeting that leads to unforeseen changes in his life.

== Cast ==
- Hu Ge as Wu Di
- Gao Yuanyuan as Feng Liuliu
- Yue Hong as Jiang Meiling
- Zhou Yemang as Wu Mingfa
- Jin Jing as Wu Shuang
- Gan Yunchen as Cao
- Liu Jun as Li Yuan
- Liu Yiwei as Liu Zhengyi
- Yuan Hong as Li Hui
- Zhang Luyi as Cheng Feng
- Wang Zhen as Wu Di's girlfriend

== Production ==
G for Gap is the first collaboration between Hu Ge and Gao Yuanyuan, and also marks Gao's return to the big screen after the 2015 film Let's Get Married. The film began shooting in Neijiang, Sichuan on May 31, 2023, and completed production in two months.

== Reception ==
=== Box office ===
As of June 10, 2024, G for Gap had surpassed ¥50 million, and just over two weeks later, on June 26, it crossed the ¥100 million mark. As of November 21, 2024, the film had earned a cumulative global box office total of US$14.568 million.

=== Critical response ===
G for Gap won Best Picture at the 14th Beijing International Film Festival with a unanimous vote from all seven jury members.

=== Accolades ===
Year	Award	Category	Recipient(s)	Result	Ref.
2024	14th Beijing International Film Festival - Tiantan Awards	Best Feature Film	Gold or Shit	Won	
2024	14th Beijing International Film Festival - Tiantan Awards	Best Supporting Actress	Yue Hong	Won	
2024	14th Beijing International Film Festival - Tiantan Awards	Best Screenplay	Huang Jia	Won	
2024	21st China Movie Channel Media Awards	Best Director	Long Fei	Nominated	
2024	21st China Movie Channel Media Awards	Best Screenwriter	Huang Jia	Nominated	
2024	21st China Movie Channel Media Awards	Best Actor	Hu Ge	Nominated	
2024	21st China Movie Channel Media Awards	Best Actress	Gao Yuanyuan	Nominated	
2024	37th Golden Rooster Awards	Best Supporting Actress	Yue Hong	Nominated	
