= Jouar el-Haouz =

Jouar El Haouz جوار الحوز
- Municipality
- Location in Lebanon
- Coordinates: 33°51′46″N 35°45′32″E
- Country: Lebanon
- Governorate: Mount Lebanon
- District: Baabda District

Area
  - Total: 3.77 km^{2} (1.46 sq mi)
- Elevation: 1,250 m (4,100 ft)
- Time zone: UTC+2 (EET)
  - Summer (DST): UTC+3 (EEST)
- Area code: 05

Jouar el Haouz (Arabic: جوار الحوز, romanized: Jiwār al-Ḥawz, locally Jwār al-Ḥōz; also spelled Jwar el Hoz) is a municipality in the Baabda District of the Mount Lebanon Governorate of Lebanon. It is located 36 kilometers east of Beirut. Its average elevation is 1,250 m (4,100 ft) above sea level, and its total land area is 377 hectares (3.77 square kilometres). The municipality is member of Federation of Matn El Aala Municipalities.

== Demography ==
The inhabitants of Jouar el Haouz are members of the Maronite Catholic Church.

== Etymology ==
The name Jouar el Haouz has an Arabic origin consisting of 2 words, "Jouar" meaning "next to" and "el Haouz". There is no consensus on the origin of the word "Haouz" as it can have 2 different meanings: The first referring to a local variety of a tree called "Haouz" bringing the name of the village to "next to el Haouz /tree". The second referring to a "piece of land, or property" bringing the name of the village to "next to the property".

== History ==
In the 18th century, Jouar el Haouz was the property of the Emir Kaidbey Abillama. As such, all the geographic, social, and economic origins of the village were directly related to the Emir's family. After the Abillamas took control of the region, Christian families started moving into the village to work the fields by building agricultural farms, under what was known the "partnership" model. The welfare of those families started to improve after the conversion of the Emir to the Maronite faith. The Chamoun family, from Tannourine, came to settle in Jouar el Haouz (c.1712), and once the number of its members started to grow, they called upon a priest to cater for their religious needs.

The priest "el Khoury" Philippos el Hage Boutros was asked accordingly to move to the village (c.1730), coming from Sakiet el Misk / Bikfaya, along with some of his family members. According to Cheikh Edmond Bleibel book "Almanac of Greater Bikfaya and the history of its families" written in 1935, the Hage Boutros family, including its 2 branches (el Khoury and Jabbour), originate from the "el Zeenni" family moving from Toula, Batroun to Sakiet el Misk, in 1593.

As such, mainly two families constitute the entire population of Jouar el Haouz, the Chamoun and the Hage Boutros.

In 1854 Jouar el Haouz started to be considered part of the "big Matn" area.

== Economy ==
The economy of Jouar el Haouz was linked since its inception to agriculture, which the emir's family began by planting tobacco and mulberry. Manufacturing and trading evolved later. The Abillamas' built a tobacco factory under the name "Abillama Bros.". Their products were sold in Istanbul and Marseille, where they received quality recognition awards in 1875, 1918 and 1922.

Following the establishment of the "Regie Libanaise des Tabacs et Tombacs" in 1935, tobacco cultivations in the village ended.

The nature of plantations evolved until it settled on mainly apples and cherries, and Jouar el Haouz apples received an award in 1956 during the Damascus food trade show. Over the years, several small factories and trading houses were developed accordingly.

== Notable People from Jouar el Haouz ==
- Emir Kaidbey Abillama- founder of the village.
- Fr. Maroun el Khoury (el Hage Boutros) (1807-1883) - Priest, known for his courage and efforts to defend the village church during the 1860 civil conflict in Mount Lebanon and Damascus.
- Toufic el Khoury (1889-1951)- mukhtar, thanks to his efforts in 1948, the village was able to have access to a public school, and in 1951 to public electricity and landline.
- Fred Maroon (1924-2001)- photographer, best known for his extensive coverage of the Nixon administration before, during and through the Watergate scandal.
- Jeannette Ayoub- athlete, winner of several Pan-Arab and Asian championships in the discus throw and hammer throw categories for women during her active years 1983-1999.
- Takla Chamoun- actress, drama instructor, producer, and the co-founder and CEO of the Lebanese Film Academy.
- Kamil Tanios- film director and producer, worked for most popular TV stations in Lebanon and the Arab world.
- Charles Khoury- painter, member of the Salon d’Automne of the Sursock Museum, the International Association of Fine Arts - Unesco in Paris, and the Association of Lebanese Artists.

== Religious Structures ==
- Saint John the Baptist church- built in 1922 and renovated in 2010, where Bishop Mgr. Youssef Bechara of Antelias celebrated the inaugurational mass.
- Tomb of the Jewish remains- in the "El Khelle" area.
- Roman tower remains- in the "El Boustan" area.
- Roman temple remains- on the top of Mount Kneisseh, nearby.
