= Beirut Open City =

- دخان بلا نار
- Directed by: Samir Habchi
- Written by: Samir Habchi
- Starring: Khaled El Nabawy; Rodney Haddad; Cyrine Abdelnour; Diamand Abou Abboud
- Cinematography: Milad Tauk
- Release date: 2008
- Running time: 100 minutes
- Country: Lebanon
- Language: Arabic

Beirut Open City (French: Beyrouth Ville Ouverte) (Arabic: دخان بلا نار, romanized: doukhan bila nar) is a 2008 Lebanese film written and directed by Samir Habchi. The film takes place after the Lebanese Civil War during the 1990s and the Syrian occupation of Lebanon.

== Cast ==
- Khaled El Nabawy
- Saad Hamdan
- Ali Al-Zein
- Joseph Bou Nassar
- Rody Klayany
- Cyrine Abdelnour
- Rodney Haddad
- Diamand Bou Abboud
