= Lolly Winston =

American writer

- Born: Hartford, Connecticut, U.S.
- Education: Sarah Lawrence College
- Writing career
- Period: 2004–present
- Genre: Fiction
- Notable works: Good Grief; Happiness Sold Separately

Lolly Winston is an American best selling novelist, known for Good Grief.

== Early life and education ==
Lolly Winston was born and raised in Hartford, Connecticut. She earned an MFA in creative writing from Sarah Lawrence College.

== Career ==
Winston wrote a collection of short stories as her thesis while at Sarah Lawrence College, and her short stories have appeared in The Sun, The Southeast Review, The Third Berkshire Anthology, Girls' Night Out, and others.

Her debut novel Good Grief was a New York Times bestseller. In 2019, the novel was optioned by screenwriters and producers Louay Khraish and Faissal Sam Shaib, and the script they wrote based on the novel was a finalist at the Austin Film Festival Script Competition.

In 2006, Julia Roberts signed on to produce and star in a film based on Winston's novel Happiness Sold Separately with Scott Coffey on aboard to pen the screenplay.

Winston has also written essays to the anthologies Kiss Tomorrow Hello and Bad Girls.

== Bibliography ==
- Good Grief (2004)
- Sophie's Bakery for the Broken Hearted (2005)
- Happiness Sold Separately (2006)
- Me For You (2019)
