= Lucien Bourjeily =

Lebanese filmmaker and stage director

- لوسيان بورجيلي
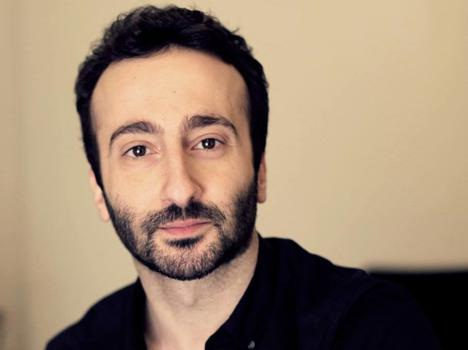
- Born: Lucien Bourjeily; Beirut, Lebanon
- Education: Loyola Marymount University (2013)
- Occupations: Playwright, Director, Filmmaker, Actor
- Notable work: Heaven Without People, 66 Minutes in Damascus, Vanishing State

Lucien Bourjeily is an Emmy-nominated writer and director of both theater and film. His work has traveled the worldwide festival circuits and won him many awards of which the 2017 Dubai International Film Festival Jury Prize. He brought his progressive approach to theatre to London's LIFT Festival in 2012 with his hard-hitting immersive play "66 Minutes in Damascus" which was chosen as one of 10 plays in the world that "rethink the stage" by the Huffington Post.

== Career ==
In 2012, he was chosen by CNN as one of 8 leading cultural lights from Lebanon's contemporary arts scene that are making an impact in Lebanon and internationally. A year later, he challenged the Lebanese government with an anti-censorship play entitled "Will it pass or not?" which was banned from public performance by the Lebanese general security but created an unprecedented media backlash against the bureau. Therefore, in May 2014 the general security confiscated Bourjeily's passport in an obscure administrative procedure called "subduing of critics" but they backed down on their decision 48 hours later after Lebanese general public outcry. For his activism against censorship on the arts in Lebanon he was nominated for the 2014 "Freedom of Expression" award held annually at the Barbican Center in London by Index on Censorship.

He wrote and directed "Vanishing State" at the Battersea Arts Center in London as part of the 2014 LIFT festival. The play implicates the audience in drafting the Middle East's countries borders along with French and English diplomats (Sykes and Picot) at the end of World War I, a secret agreement at the time, whose consequences are still strongly felt today throughout the Levant region.

Just months after the civil strife in Tripoli ended, during the spring of 2015, he wrote a play entitled "Love and War on the Rooftop", which was performed, under his direction, by ex-fighters from the warring neighborhoods of Beb El Tebbeneh and Jabal Mohsen.

His most recent play entitled "Beirut Syndrome" exploring the theme of political corruption was banned from public performance in Lebanon by the Lebanese General Security.

== Awards and nominations ==
Award/Festival	Category	Nominee (s)	Result	Year
Miami International Film Festival	Jordan Ressler Screenwriting Award	Heaven Without People	Nominated	2018
RiverRun International Film Festival	Best Film	Heaven Without People	Nominated	2018
Cinequest Film Festival	Global Vision Award	Heaven Without People	Won	2018
Independent Film Festival Boston	Best Film	Heaven Without People	Nominated	2018
Festival des Cinémas Arabes à Paris	Special Jury Prize	Heaven Without People	Won	2018
Festival des Cinémas Arabes à Paris	Best Ensemble Cast	Heaven Without People	Won	2018
Los Angeles Film Festival	World Fiction - Best Film	Heaven Without People	Nominated	2018
Hamburg Film Festival	Critic's Choice Award	Heaven Without People	Nominated	2018
Festival du film arabe de Fameck	Grand Prix	Heaven Without People	Won	2018
Washington DC FilmFest	Jury Prize Arabian Sights	Heaven Without People	Won	2018
Mostra de València	Golden Palm	Heaven Without People	Nominated	2018
St. Louis International Film Festival	Joe Pollack Jury Award	Heaven Without People	Nominated	2018
Cairo International Film Festival	Salah Abu Seif Award	Heaven Without People	Nominated	2018
Dubai International Film Festival	Special Jury Prize	Heaven Without People	Won	2017
