= 1982 (2019 film) =

2019 Lebanese drama film

- Film poster
- Directed by: Oualid Mouaness
- Written by: Oualid Mouaness
- Produced by: Alix Madigan; Oualid Mouaness; Myriam Sassine; Georges Schoucair; Christopher Tricarico
- Starring: Nadine Labaki; Mohamad Dalli; Gia Madi; Rodrigue Sleiman; Aliya Khalidi; Ghassan Maalouf
- Cinematography: Brian Rigney Hubbard
- Edited by: Jad Dani Ali Hassan; Sabine El Gemayel
- Music by: Nadim Mishlawi
- Production companies: Tricycle Logic; Abbout Productions; Boo Pictures; Barentsfilm; Mad Dog Films; Soapbox Films
- Distributed by: MC Distribution
- Release dates: 8 September 2019 (TIFF); 23 September 2019
- Running time: 100 minutes
- Countries: Lebanon; Norway; France; Qatar
- Languages: Arabic; English; French
- Box office: $60,751

1982 is a 2019 internationally co-produced drama film written and directed by Oualid Mouaness, and starring Nadine Labaki and Mohamad Dalli.

The film premiered at the 2019 Toronto International Film Festival, where it won the NETPAC Award for World or International Asian Film Premiere. It was selected as the Lebanese entry for the Best International Feature Film at the 92nd Academy Awards. It won the 2021 Cannes Film Festival Young Cinema sidebar {Prix Cannes Ecrans Juniors 2021}.

== Plot ==
Set against the beginning of the 1982 Lebanon War, the film stars Nadine Labaki as Yesmine, a schoolteacher in Beirut, and Mohamad Dalli as Wissam, a young boy in her class who is trying to find the courage to tell his classmate Joanna (Gia Madi) that he has a crush on her.

== Production ==
1982 was produced by companies based in Lebanon, Norway, France and Qatar. North American digital, ancillary & broadcast rights were purchased by Utopia. North American theatrical, events & educational rights are held by Tricycle Logic.

== See also ==
- List of submissions to the 92nd Academy Awards for Best International Feature Film
- List of Lebanese submissions for the Academy Award for Best International Feature Film
