= Heaven Without People =

Heaven Without People (Film)
- Directed by: Lucien Bourjeily
- Written by: Lucien Bourjeily
- Produced by: Farah Shaer; Lucien Bourjeily
- Starring: Samira Sarkis; Jenny Gebara; Nadim Abou Samra; Laeticia Semaan; Farah Shaer; Ghassan Chemali; Nancy Karam; Jean Paul Hage; Hussein Hijazi; Wissam Botrous; Etafer Aweke; Toni Habib; Mohamad Abbas
- Cinematography: Ahmad Al Traboulsi
- Release dates: 6 December 2017 (Dubai); 1 March 2018 (Lebanon)
- Running time: 91 minutes
- Country: Lebanon
- Language: Lebanese Arabic

Heaven Without People; Arabic: غداء العيد, romanized: Ghada El Eid, lit. 'Festive Lunch') is the debut feature-length film written and directed by Lucien Bourjeily. It premiered in the main Muhr Awards competition section of the 14th Dubai International Film Festival and won the Special Jury Prize award. It went on to win the Global Vision Award at the 2018 Cinequest Film Festival and both the "Special Jury Prize" and "Ensemble Cast" award at the Festival des cinémas arabes à Paris. Furthermore, it competed in many international film festivals and was nominated for the Jordan Ressler award at the 2018 Miami International Film Festival, the Critics' Choice Award at the 2018 Hamburg Film Festival and the Best World Fiction film award at the 2018 LA Film Festival.

== Synopsis ==
"When a large family comes together for the first time in two years over Easter lunch, tensions bubble to the surface in surprising ways as they navigate an unforeseen conflict that threatens to derail their reunion. Older and younger generations clash as each of the family members confront their own political and moral hypocrisies and slowly unravel the ties that bind."

== Cast ==
- Samira Sarkis as Josephine (Aka Joujou)
- Wissam Botrous as Antoine (Her husband)
- Nadim Abou Samra as Serge
- Laeticia Semaan as Leila
- Farah Shaer as Rita
- Jenny Gebara as Noha (Josephine's sister)
- Ghassan Chemali as Rabih
- Nancy Karam as Christine
- Jean Paul Hage as Elias
- Hussein Hijazi as Gaby
- Toni Habib as Sami (Noha's son)
- Etafer Aweke as Zoufan
- Mohamad Abbas as Nabil (Gaby's friend)
- Ivy Helou as Yara (Elias and Christine's daughter)

== Awards ==
Award/Festival	Category	Winner/Nominee	Won
Dubai International Film Festival	Special Jury Prize	Lucien Bourjeily	Won
Miami International Film Festival	Jordan Ressler Screenwriting Award	Lucien Bourjeily	Nominated
RiverRun International Film Festival	Best Film	Lucien Bourjeily	Nominated
Cinequest Film Festival	Global Vision Award	Lucien Bourjeily	Won
Independent Film Festival Boston	Best Film	Lucien Bourjeily	Nominated
Festival des Cinémas Arabes à Paris	Special Jury Prize	Lucien Bourjeily	Won
Festival des Cinémas Arabes à Paris	Best Ensemble Cast	Ensemble Cast	Won
Los Angeles Film Festival	World Fiction - Best Film	Lucien Bourjeily	Nominated
Hamburg Film Festival	Critic's Choice Award	Lucien Bourjeily	Nominated
Festival du film arabe de Fameck	Grand Prix	Lucien Bourjeily	Won
Washington DC FilmFest	Jury Prize Arabian Sights	Lucien Bourjeily	Won
Mostra de València	Golden Palm	Lucien Bourjeily	Nominated
St. Louis International Film Festival	Joe Pollack Jury Award	Lucien Bourjeily	Nominated
Cairo International Film Festival	Salah Abu Seif Award	Lucien Bourjeily	Nominated
