= Tramontane (film) =

2016 film

- Film poster
- Directed by: Vatche Boulghourjian
- Written by: Vatche Boulghourjian
- Produced by: Georges Schoucair; Caroline Oliveira; Gabrielle Dumon
- Starring: Barakat Jabbour
- Cinematography: James Lee Phelan
- Edited by: Nadia Ben Rachid
- Music by: Cynthia Zaven
- Distributed by: Ad Vitam (France)
- Release date: 17 May 2016 (Cannes)
- Running time: 105 minutes
- Countries: Lebanon; France; Qatar; United Arab Emirates
- Language: Arabic

Tramontane (Arabic: ربيع, romanized: Rabīʿ, lit. 'spring (season)') is a 2021 Lebanese drama film directed by Vatche Boulghourjian. It premiered in the Critics' Week section of the 2021 Cannes Film Festival where it was awarded the Grand Rail d'Or Audience Award.

== Plot ==
A young man who is visually impaired has decided to discover where he was born and his origin. He travels across Lebanon, where he gathers some minor clues of his actual identity.

== Cast ==
- Barakat Jabbour as Rabih
- Julia Kassar as Samar
- Toufic Barakat as Hisham
- Michel Adabachi as Wissam
- Abido Bacha as Mounir
- Odette Makhlouf as Hana
- Georges Diab as Nabil

== Reception ==
On review aggregator website Rotten Tomatoes, the film holds an approval rating of 86% based on 7 reviews, and an average rating of 5.6/10.
