= Michel Kammoun =

Lebanese-French film director

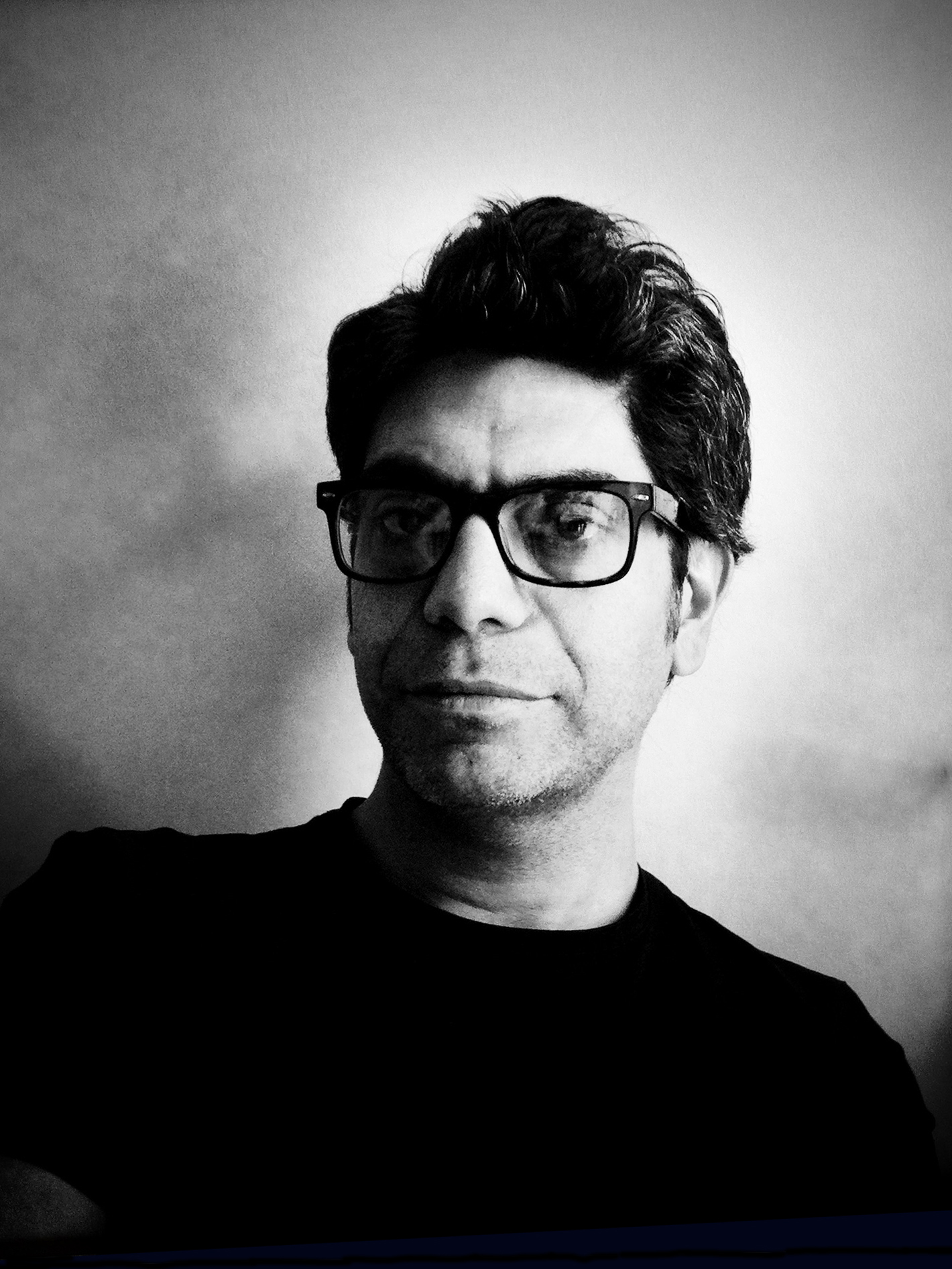
- Born: Sierra Leone
- Occupation: Director
- Years active: 1993 - present
- Website: www.michelkammoun.com

Michel Kammoun (Arabic: ميشيل كمون) is a Lebanese-French film director. He is mostly known for his 2006 feature film Falafel, which won Golden Bayard for Best Film at the 2006 Festival International du Film Francophone de Namur.

== Early life ==
Michel Kammoun was born in Sierra Leone.

== Career ==
After studying architecture, Michel Kammoun joined the film school ESEC in Paris. He has written and directed many short films. His films have participated in many international festivals and were distributed in numerous countries including the USA, Canada, Latin America, Switzerland, Singapore, Spain, Germany, Belgium, Italy, and France. He has also directed commercials and held screenwriting workshops. Today, Michel Kammoun lives between Beirut and Paris. His first feature film, Falafel, has won nine international awards, participated in prestigious film festivals worldwide, and earned international acclamation.

== Filmography ==
- Cathodique (1993)
- Shadows (1995)
- The Shower (1999)
- Clowning Around/The Vanishing Rabbits (2003)
- Falafel (2006)
- Beirut Hold'em (2019)
- Love, Life & Everything in Between (2022)

== Awards ==
For Falafel:

- Golden Bayard for Best Film - Namur International Film Festival, Belgium, 2006
- Golden Bayard for Best Music - Namur International Film Festival, Belgium 2006
- Prix spécial du Jury at the 2008 Festival du Premier Film d'Annonay
- Palmera de Bronce for Best Film, - XXVIII MOSTRA de VALENCIA, Spain 2007
- Audience Award - LILLE International Film Festival, France 2007
- Best First Film Award - ROTTERDAM Arab Film Festival, Netherlands 2007
- Art Award (Best First Film Award) - Alexandria International Film Festival, Egypt 2007.
- Bronze Dagger for Best Film, Muscat International Film Festival, Oman 2008.
- Silver Muhr for Best Film - Dubai International Film Festival, UAE 2006.
