= Mahbas =

- Directed by: Sophie Boutros and Al Jacob
- Written by: Sophie Boutros and Nadia Eliewat
- Produced by: Nadia Eliewat
- Starring: Julia Kassar; Ali El Khalil; Bassam Koussa; Betty Taoutel; Nadine Khoury; Jaber Jokhadar
- Cinematography: Rachel Aoun
- Edited by: Fadi Hadad
- Music by: Ziad Boutros
- Production companies: Screen Project Jam Productions Arab Radio and Television (ART) In-House Films
- Distributed by: MC Distribution (2016) Arab Radio and Television (ART)
- Release dates: 2016 (Dubai Festival); March 2017
- Running time: 92 minutes
- Country: Lebanon
- Language: Arabic

Mahbas (Solitaire) is a Lebanese romantic, comedy movie directed by Sophie Boutros and produced by Nadia Eliewat; Both Boutros and Eliewat are the film writers. The film premiered in the Dubai International Film Festival in 2016 and released in Lebanon, Syria, Jordan, UAE, Kuwait, and Palestine in 2017. The film revolves around the story of a Lebanese mother who has developed a deep hatred towards Syrians as she lost her brother to a tragic incident during the Lebanese-Syrian war. The memory of her brother's death still fresh, keeps her hatred ongoing to the point that when she finds out that her daughter's suitor and his family are Syrians, she is determined to stop the engagement. The film has a message of tolerance and forgiveness explicit in the two families comedic roller coaster ups and downs that eventually unravels the hatred in the end. Although the film targets the Lebanese and the Syrians, its message is applicable to other Arab neighbors and in general too.

== Plot ==
The movie starts with Theresa, a Lebanese woman, tasting pickles, and then spitting it out once she finds out it's made by a Syrian refugee. Theresa then reaches home and starts preparing for her daughter, Ghada's, engagement that day, and is seen talking with her dead brother's photo which she imagines as talking back to her. Her brother died due to a Syrian bomb attack during the Lebanese- Syrian war. Theresa's neighbor Solange talks with Marwan, Ghada's ex, who has no clue its Ghada's engagement and has bought a ring to propose to Ghada when she gets back from Dubai. Maurice, Theresa's husband who is also the Mayor of the town, is seen with another woman who he promises to go on a trip with, but she is mad at him for always making excuses. Meanwhile, Ghada's suitor, Samer, and his parents are on their way to Ghada's house and are talking about border problems as they are Syrians. Ghada comes back from Dubai and is picked up by her father, Maurice, who avoids telling Ghada that he did not mention Samer's Syrian background to Theresa. Theresa only gets to know that Samer is Syrian from his Syrian dialect, and she is shocked to the core.

While Samer and his parents awkwardly wait in the living room unknown of Theresa's racism towards Syrians, Maurice and Ghada try convincing Theresa. Theresa then thinks of a plan to destroy the engagement by secretly calling Marwan (Ghada's ex) over to the house. A quick conversation between the two families, the families then head outside to roam around. Theresa visits Marwan's Tango classes and also takes a framed picture of Ghada and Marwan together in a dancing competition to show the family later on. Once home, Samer then asks to help Theresa in the kitchen and when noticing Ghada's uncle's photo he expresses condolence and is sad that he died from a disease; Ghada lied to him about her uncle's death. Theresa, pretending to be okay with what Samer said and with the engagement, gives him her brother's old watch as a present.

The lunch part is one of the exciting scenes of the movie as the two families sit down and converse with each other. Riad, Samer's father, eagerly keeps the conversation going by first asking Theresa of her brother's trips to Syria. Finding out that Theresa and her brother used to enjoy a famous Syrian singer's song together, Riad starts singing the same song to which everyone joins and Theresa smiles slightly as Riad reminds her of her brother. Then enters Marwan who brings a chair to the dining table and sits right next to Ghada, with Samer staring intensely across the table. Ghada and Marwan converse about their childhood memories to which Samer gets annoyed as he never heard Ghada mention her childhood memories with Marwan. Samer and Marwan exchange snappy comments at each other with Theresa adding fuel to the fire by mentioning Ghada and Marwan performing couple dance for a dance competition. She quickly gets up to get the photo of them together. At this time, Maurice's assistant, who Maurice is having an affair with, comes to the house and abruptly mentions that Maurice and she will be traveling together to Turkey, which Maurice quickly replies as ‘for a conference.’ This, of course, catches the attention of Nazek, Samer's mother. Riad then insists on seeing Ghada and Marwan's dance and they end up doing so, while Samer gets jealous and gets up and takes Ghada from Marwan's hands and starts dancing with her. Due to Marwan's snappy comment, Samer punches him and then it goes downhill.

Marwan shows Samer the email Ghada sent 3 months ago to Marwan in which she mentions, along the lines, that ‘she feels lonely, misses him, and wants to be with him.’ Ghada accepts her mistake and mentions to Marwan that she felt lonely because that night Samer was upset with her. She felt that he is never proud of her and that she feels like she should change herself to be with him. After an emotional conversation, Ghada and Samer make up to which Theresa then starts thinking of another way to break the engagement. Theresa decides to hide the ring Samer bought for Ghada and place it in Samer's mother's bag. Upon finding the ring in Nazek's bag, Ghada and Samer end up in a fight in which the truth of Theresa hating Syrians and Maurice's affair is out with the engagement broken.

Theresa confronts Maurice about his affair and during this confrontation, Theresa realizes her mistake of breaking Ghada's engagement and goes to apologize to her. After Ghada's and Theresa's mother-daughter bonding, Theresa accepts Samer and encourages Ghada to meet with Samer to sort things out. Samer and Ghada get back together, while Theresa gives her wedding ring back to Maurice that signifies separation. The story ends with Samer and Ghada's wedding and both families happy.

== Cast ==
- Julia Kassar as Therese
- Ali El Khalil as Maurice
- Bassam Koussa as Riad
- Nadine Khoury as Nazek
- Betty Taoutel as neighbour Solange
- Jaber Jokhadar as Samer
- Serena Chami as Ghada
- Said Serhan as Marwan
- Daniel Balaban as Imad
- Samir Youssef as Toufic

== Production ==
=== Development ===
The film writers began their project in 2013. Initially, Boutros and Eliewat planned on working on a short film until they realised the amount of content they had could possibly make a lengthy film. Louay Khraish developed the story with Boutros and Eliewat during the early development stage. The elements of the Lebanese and the Syrian dynamics was added on later and Boutross and Eliewat were encouraged to add comic elements by an Italian script consultant. Jam Production, Boutros’ Beirut-based company, and Screen Project, Nadia's Jordanian production house, produced the film. The Arab Radio and Television Network (ART) guaranteed the film TV screenings as ART took on broadcast sales right. The associate producer was In-House Films Dubai and the line producers were Sabine Sidawi and Jinane Dagher from Orjouane Productions. The film was financially supported by three Lebanese investors and Damas Jewelry acted as the sponsor and made a unique ring design to be used in the film. The shooting began in December 2015 and the film was shot entirely in Lebanon.

== Release ==
The film was screened in the Cannes Film Festival. The film had a world premier in Dubai International Film Festival in 2016 with Sophie Boutros becoming the most highly anticipated Arab director. It released in Lebanon, Syria, Jordan, UAE, Kuwait and Palestine in 2017. Mahbas held the second spot, after Beauty and the Beast, on the Lebanese box office. Mahbas also featured and opened the 21st annual Arab Film Festival at the Castro Theatre on October 13.

== Nominations ==
Mahbas got nominated 9 times. The first one was when Sophie Boutros was nominated for the 'Audience Award' in Hamburg Film Festival 2017. The other nominations include:

The Lebanese Movie Awards 2018 (Nominees):
Best Lebanese Motion Picture	
Best Ensemble Cast In A Lebanese Motion Picture	Julia Kassar Ali El Khalil Bassam Kousa Nadine Khoury Betty Taoutal Serena Chami
Best Lebanese Director – Motion Picture	Sophie Boutros
Best Writing In A Lebanese Motion Picture	Sophie Boutros Nadia Eliewat
Best Editing In A Lebanese Motion Picture	Fadi Haddad
Best Production Design In A Lebanese Motion Picture	Elsie Moukarzel
Best Soundtrack In A Lebanese Motion Picture	Ziad Boutros
Best Wardrobe In A Lebanese Motion Picture	Beatrice Harb
