= Arzé =

2023 Lebanese film

- Film poster featuring Diamand Abou Abboud
- Directed by: Mira Shaib
- Written by: Louay Khraish; Faissal Sam Shaib
- Produced by: Faissal Sam Shaib; Louay Khraish; Zeina Badran
- Cinematography: Heyjin Jun
- Edited by: Hisham Saqr
- Music by: Hany Adel
- Release date: June 2024 (Tribeca Festival)
- Running time: 93 minutes
- Country: Lebanon

Arzé (Arabic: أرزة) is a 2024 Lebanese comedy-drama directed by Mira Shaib in her feature directorial debut. The film stars Diamand Abou Abboud, Betty Taoutel, and Bilal Al Hamwi. The film was Lebanon's submission to the 97th Academy Award, but was not nominated.

== Plot ==
Arzé is a single mother in Beirut who is determined to buy her son Kinan a scooter so he can help her deliver the pies (sfiha) she bakes, her only source of income. She cannot afford the down payment, and tries to convince her sister Layla to let her sell her bracelet. Layla refuses, as the bracelet is a prized gift from her long-absent lover Zain, whom she insists will return. Frustrated, Arzé steals and pawns the bracelet.

Arzé presents Kinan with the scooter on his 18th birthday. Kinan shares with his girlfriend Yasmine his intention to emigrate to Europe for a better life and to find his father, whom he believes is living there. Yasmine encourages him to stay in Lebanon and participate in the ongoing protests. After celebrating Kinan's birthday with friends, they discover the scooter has been stolen. The police are unhelpful when Arzé and Kinan attempt to make a report, and that night Arzé spies on Layla mournfully dancing alone in a wedding dress.

Arzé and Kinan set out to find the scooter. They initially follow the truck of a Greek Orthodox man, who sends them to the Sunni quarter. Arzé is redirected through Shia, Maronite, and Palestinian neighborhoods. During this process, she adapts her clothing to blend into these different areas with help from her increasingly exasperated shopkeeper friend Dina, while she uses her charm and free pies to get more information from the people she encounters.

During the search, Kinan learns Yasmine is emigrating; he reacts angrily and Yasmine storms off. Layla comforts Kinan and accepts his desire to emigrate, but is worried about his plans to take a dangerous sea route into Europe. Kinan argues with Arzé over the lost scooter and Kinan's future plans. Arzé explains that Kinan's father did not emigrate, but vanished before he was born. Kinan angrily walks off. Layla, who cannot find the bracelet she was hoping to sell for Kinan, calls Arzé home. Arzé admits she stole the bracelet, leaving both of them in tears. Arzé resumes her search and just as she reaches a dead end, Kinan appears and reports Layla has gone missing. They find her at a destroyed apartment building, where she is fantasizing about the life she would have had with Zain living in this building. The three return home, where Arzé apologizes and reconciles with her sister.

Kinan and Yasmine reaffirm their love as he properly says goodbye to Yasmine. Their friends arrive and give Kinan a tip about where the scooter might be. Arzé, initially reluctant, suddenly has a change of heart while making pies with Layla and travels to the scrapyard with Kinan. Along the way, Arzé explains that Zain was kidnapped and reportedly died in a Syrian prison several years ago. Kinan questions whether Arzé is right to hide this, and she explains Layla is not strong enough to hear it. At the scrapyard, they find the scooter. The owner refuses to let them take it, but Arzé and Kinan trick him and lock him in his office before driving away. The two happily ride home together through the streets of Beirut.

== Cast ==
- Diamand Abou Abboud as Arzé
- Betty Taoutel as Layla
- Bilal Al Hamwi as Kinan
- Shaden Fakih as Dina
- Hagop Der Ghougassian as Sevag
- Junaid Zeineldine as Noor
- Fouad Yammine as Nicolas
- Fadi Abi Samra as Joseph
- Tarek Tamim as Saadeddine
- Elie Mitri as Junkyard Owner
- Joyce Nasrallah as Odette
- Saad Kadri as Ahmad
- Ibrahim Ajami as Ali
- Mounir Challita as Mandoor
- Kathy Youness as Yasmine

== Development ==
The film is written and produced by Louay Khraish and Faissal Sam Shaib. The script, by Faissal Sam Shaib and Louay Khraish, was an Official Finalist in the First Time Screenwriter Competition at the 2018 Amsterdam Film Festival Van Gogh Awards.

After being signed on to the project, Mira Shaib and Producer Zeina Badran were selected in 2018 to Film Independent's Global Media Makers LA Residency where they developed the project. In 2019, the film was among only six Arabic projects selected to the inaugural Red Sea Lodge, which was in collaboration with the TorinoFilmLab. The film, originally titled, I Am Arzé, was among the first recipients of the Red Sea Film Festival Foundation Production Fund.

== Production ==
First-time director Mira Shaib, looking for someone who would have first-hand experience with the situation of his character, cast non-professional Bilal Al Hamwi to play Kinan alongside experienced actors Diamand Abou Abboud and Betty Taoutel in lead roles.

Arzé was shot on location in Beirut in 21 locations over 23 days. Film production was delayed due to external factors including the mass protests in Beirut and the pandemic.

== Release ==
Mira Shaib, Louay Khraish, Zeina Badran and Faissal Sam Shaib at the Tribeca premiere of Arzé, June 2024

The film had its world premiere in Beijing and its North American premiere in Tribeca. The Tribeca screenings were hosted by the nonprofit film organization, The Future of Film is Female.

Arzé was initially selected to premiere in the Official Competition of the 45th Cairo International Film Festival, but the festival was canceled due to the Gaza war. The film was selected again the following year to compete in the Horizons of Arab Cinema where Louay Khraish and Faissal Sam Shaib won the Youssef Sherif Rezkallah Award for Best Screenplay and Diamand Abou Abboud the Best Actress Award, a day after she won the Snow Leopard Best Actor Award at the Asian World Film festival.

Arzé opened in theaters across Lebanon on September 5, 2024.

Cineverse acquired the English-language distribution rights for Arzé to distribute across its platforms, including Fandor, in the U.S., Canada, the UK, Australia, and New Zealand.

== Reception ==
Arzé received positive reviews after its premiere in Tribeca. Liz Whittemore of Reel News Daily praised the film, saying it was "a slice of genius" and "a delightful and entirely unexpected film in Tribeca 2024’s lineup, but undeniably one of the best." Whittemore also praised the script by Louay Khraish and Faissal Sam Shaib, saying it offered "moments of levity amidst the seriousness of Arzé’s plight... an interesting commentary on blame, the dangers of stereotyping, and tribalism." Paul Emmanuel Enicola of The Movie Buff praised Mira Shaib for "making Arzé a multidimensional character that makes her more relatable, frustrating, endearing, and more human." Nicole Sherine from the Alliance of Women Film Journalists, also praised how Shaib directed the film "with an eye toward sensory experiences—imbuing the film with a rise and fall; highs of humor and intimacy juxtaposed with lows of disillusionment and anger."

== Submission to the Academy Awards ==
After a successful theatrical release in Lebanon, Arzé was selected as Lebanon's official submission for the 97th Academy Awards.

== Festivals & Awards ==
Festival	Date of ceremony	Section	Award	Result	Notes	Ref(s)
Malmö Arab Film Festival	April 29 – May 5, 2025	In Competition	Feature Film Competition	Won - Audience Award	Swedish Premiere	
Hollywood Arab Film Festival	December 14 – 21, 2024	In Competition	Golden Horizon	Won - Best Actress		
Carthage Film Festival	December 14 – 21, 2024	In Competition	Golden Tanit	Won - Best Music	Tunisian Premiere	
Cairo International Film Festival	November 13 – 22, 2024	In Competition	Horizons of Arab Cinema	Won - Best Actress & Best Script	Arab & African Premiere	
Asian World Film Festival	November 13 – 21, 2024	In Competition	Main Competition - Snow Leopard	Won - Best Actress	SoCal Premiere	
Arab Film Festival	October 24 – November 5, 2024	In Competition	Main Competition	Won - Best Debut Feature	Bay Area Premiere	
Newport Beach Film Festival	October 17 – 24, 2024	In Competition	Narrative Drama Series	Nominated	West Coast Premiere	
Lebanese Film Festival Australia	August 15 – 31, 2024	In Competition	Film of the Year	Won - Film of the Year	Australia Premiere	
Tribeca Festival	June 5 – 16, 2024	In Competition	Viewpoints	Nominated	North American Premiere	
Beijing International Film Festival	April 18 – 26, 2024	In Competition	Future Forward	Nominated	World Premiere	
Cairo International Film Festival	November 15 – 24, 2023 (Canceled)	In Competition	Golden Pyramid	Nominated	Official selection at CIFF but festival was postponed.	

== See also ==
- List of submissions to the 97th Academy Awards for Best International Feature Film
- List of Lebanese submissions for the Academy Award for Best International Feature Film
