= The Lebanese Cinema Movie Guide Awards =

The LMAs
- Current: The 6th Annual LMAs
- Awarded for: Outstanding Lebanese & International Cinematic Achievements
- Country: Lebanon
- Presented by: The Lebanese Movie Awards
- Hosted by: Emilio Eid
- First award: March 4, 2014
- Website: www.lbmovieawards.com

The Lebanese Movie Awards known as The LMAs, is an award ceremony recognizing the best Lebanese & International cinematic achievements in the film making industry. The LMAs honors these films both in their artistic and technical aspects with categories including Best Lebanese Motion Picture, Best Directing, Best Cinematography, Best Production Design, among others.

The award was first presented in 2014, at Vox Cinemas, before finally moving in 2018 to The Casino Du Liban, a lush and luxurious venue hosting the ceremony so far. The LMAs is the first and only award ceremony for film in Lebanon.

The 5th edition of the LMAs was held on the 17th of April at The Casino Du Liban, with 7 films competing in major categories, The Insult by Ziad Doueiri came out as the big winner with 4 awards including Best Picture. Mahbass took home two awards for Best Soundtrack and Best Costume Design and Tramontane picked up the award for Best Director.

== Nomination ==
The nominees were announced Live on Monday January 15, 2018, on MTV Lebanon, by the president and founder Emilio Eid.

The nominees included a total of 7 films, competing for 10 categories among which Best Picture, Best Lebanese Director, Best Ensemble Cast and more. This year a new category was added to honor the achievement of costume designers under the title of Best Wardrobe. For the sixth edition new categories will be added including Best Independent Short & Best Documentary Feature

== Jury Members ==
The jury members for the fifth edition are as follows, Emile Chahine, Sam Lahoud, Anne Dominique Toussaint, Darine Hamze, Phillipe Aractangi, Hassan Mrad, Fadi Abi Samra, Nibal Arakji, Mario Jr. Haddad, Pierre Rabbat, Zeina Daccache and Ghida Majzoub

Jury Members are carefully selected each year, as the LMA cares to keep a track record of prestigious and esteemed figures voting for the nominated films. Each jury member would receive his voting ballot and will have a period of time to cast his votes and return his ballot. All jury members votes are kept confidential at all times.

Here's a few of the jury we've had across the years: Raya Abirached, Elias Doummar, Marie-There Maalouf, Amin Dora, Jassmina Najjar, Mahmoud Hojeij, Georges Khabbaz, Wissam Breidy as well as many others.

== Venues ==
For the first two years, the awards were presented at Vox Cinema Lebanese, before eventually moving to the prestigious downtown location, at Beirut Souks Cinemacity, which hosted the award ceremony for the third and fourth edition.

The awards moved to the Casino Du Liban, in Jounieh which currently hosts the awards for future editions.

== Categories ==
=== Current categories ===
- Best Lebanese Motion Picture
- Best Lebanese Director - Motion Picture
- Best Writing In A Lebanese Motion Picture
- Best Editing In A Lebanese Motion Picture
- Best Soundtrack In A Lebanese Motion Picture
- Best Sound Design In A Lebanese Motion Picture
- Best Cinematography In A Lebanese Motion Picture
- Best Ensemble Cast In A Lebanese Motion Picture
- Best Production Design In A Lebanese Motion Picture
- Best Wardrobe In A Lebanese Motion Picture
- Best Documentary Feature
- Best Independent Short

=== Cinematic Achievement Award ===
The cinematic achievement award is awarded to a special recipient who has worked and pushed the boundaries of the Lebanese film industry and who has made a notable contribution to its international recognition. The first recipient was Georges Khabbaz, who has worked on films such as Ghadi, Void and Under The Bombs. The recipient name would only be announced a few days before the ceremony.

== Trivia ==
- At the 5th edition of The Lebanese Movie Awards, a joint win was in place for Best Wardrobe for the film The Insult & Mahbas awarding both Lara Mae Khamis & Beatrice Harb

== Winners ==
Winners	2014	2015	2016	2017	2018
Best Lebanese Movie Of The Year	Ghadi	Stable Unstable	The Valley	Listen	The Insult
Best Lebanese Director In A Motion Picture	-	Philippe Aractingie - Heritages	Hady Zaccack - Kamal Joumblatt	Danielle Arbid - Parisienne	Vatche Boulghourjian - Tramontane
Best Lebanese Film Editing	-	Heritages	Kamal Joumblatt	Nuts	The Traveller
Best Lebanese Film Writing	-	Georges Khabbaz - Void	Ghassan Salhab - The Valley	Assad Fouladkar - Halal Love	Joelle Touma - Ziad Doueiri - The Insult
Best Lebanese Motion Picture Soundtrack	-	Kahled Mouzanar - Scheherazade's Diary	Emile Aoud - Kamal Joumblatt	Sandra Arslanian - Listen	Ziad Boutros - Mahbass
Best Lebanese Sound Design	-	-	Florent Lavallee - The Valley	Rana Eid - Listen	Beatrice Wick - Go Home
Best Lebanese Production Design	-	-	-	Nuts - Maia El Khoury	The Insult - Hussein Baydoun
Best Lebanese Wardrobe	-	-	-	-	The Insult - Lara Mae Khamis - Mahbass - Beatrice Harb
Best Ensemble Cast In A Lebanese Motion Picture	-	Void	Single Married Divorced	Yalla 3a2belkon Chabeb	The Insult
Best Lebanese Cinematography	-	-	Bassem Fayad - The Valley	Christopher Aoun - Listen	Muriel Aboulrouss - 104 Wrinkles
Best Lebanese Cinema	Vox Cinemas	Vox Cinemas	Beirut Souks Cinemacity	Beirut Souks Cinemacity	
