= Good Grief (novel) =

2004 novel by Lolly Winston

- Author: Lolly Winston
- Language: English
- Genre: Contemporary Women Fiction
- Published: March 2004 Grand Central Publishing
- Publication place: US
- Media type: Print (Hardback and Paperback)
- Pages: 367
- ISBN: 0446694843
- OCLC: 55053886

Good Grief is a 2004 novel by the New York Times bestselling author Lolly Winston.

== Plot summary ==
Thirty-six-year-old Sophie Stanton desperately wants to be a good widow-a graceful, composed, Jackie Kennedy kind of widow. Alas, she is more of the Jack Daniels kind. Self-medicating with ice cream for breakfast, breaking down at the supermarket, and showing up to work in her bathrobe and bunny slippers-soon she's not only lost her husband, but her job, house...and waistline. With humor and chutzpah Sophie leaves town, determined to reinvent her life. But starting over has its hurdles; soon she's involved with a thirteen-year-old who has a fascination with fire, and a handsome actor who inspires a range of feelings she can't cope with-yet.

== Commercial and critical reception ==
In her New York Times review, Janet Maslin wrote that Holly Winston treats matters of life and death with incongruous lightness and insistent lovability, capably rendered and extremely reader-friendly.

The novel was on the New York Times best sellers lists for more than 15 weeks.
