= The Last Man (2006 film) =

- Poster of the movie
- French: Le dernier homme
- Arabic: اطلال
- Directed by: Ghassan Salhab
- Written by: Ghassan Salhab
- Produced by: Marie Balducchi
- Starring: Carlos Chahine; Raia Haidar; Faek Homaissi; Raymond Hosni; Aouni Kawas; May Sahab
- Cinematography: Jacques Bouquin
- Edited by: Michèle Tyan
- Music by: Cynthia Zaven
- Distributed by: Agat Films & Cie; Djinn House Productions
- Release date: 9 August 2006 (Locarno Film Festival)
- Running time: 101 minutes
- Country: Lebanon
- Language: Arabic

The Last Man (French: Le dernier homme; Arabic: اطلال) is a 2006 Lebanese film by the Lebanese director Ghassan Salhab.

The film was presented in Cannes 2007 during the Tous les cinemas du monde section. Carlos Chahine won the Best actor prize for his role at the Singapore International Film Festival 2007.

== Synopsis ==
Khalil (Carlos Chahine), a doctor who works at an hospital, is strangely linked to victims of a serial killer who leaves them without blood.

== Cast and characters ==
- Carlos Chahine as Khalil
- Faek Homaissi as Dr. Labib
- Raia Haidar
- Raymond Hosni
- Aouni Kawas as L'autre
- Abla Khoury
- May Sahab as L'assistante
- Jalal Toufic as Doctor

== Reception ==
=== Critical response ===
According to critic aggregation site Rotten Tomatoes, it has an audience rating of 50% and an IMDb critic rating of 6.3/10.
