= Mira Shaib =

Lebanese film director

- Born: 7 October 1993 (age 32); Beirut, Lebanon
- Education: Lebanese American University (BA); Concordia University (MFA)
- Occupations: Film director; Screenwriter
- Years active: 2016–present

Mira Shaib is a Lebanese filmmaker known for Arzé, which had its North America premiere in Tribeca and was Lebanon's submission to the 97th Academy Award.

== Education ==
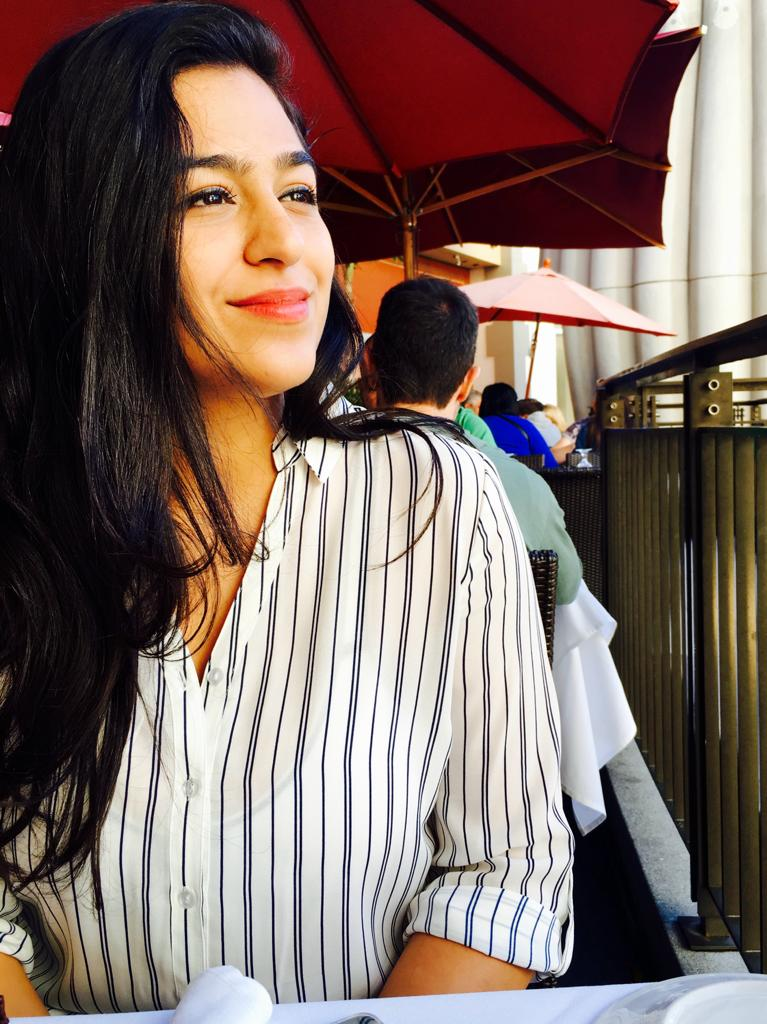
Shaib in 2023

Mira Shaib earned a Bachelor of Arts in Film & Television from the Lebanese American University (LAU) in Beirut and a Master of Fine Arts in Cinematic Arts from Concordia University's Mel Hoppenheim School of Cinema in Montreal. In October 2013 while at LAU, she directed a university production of Eugène Ionesco's The Lesson.

== Career ==
Mira Shaib is an alumnus of prestigious film development labs and residencies, including Robert Bosch Stiftung, where she attended the Film Academy Baden-Württemberg, Film Independent's Global Media Makers LA Residency, the Red Sea Lodge, and the Torino Film Lab. Her first feature film was among the first recipients of the Red Sea Film Festival Foundation Production Fund.

Mira is the cofounder of Cinema For All, an arts initiative with a mission to make cinema accessible in rural Lebanon. The initiative was launched in 2019 in Ain Ebel with film-making workshops and outdoor screenings of Sophie Boutros' Mahbas and Cyril Aris's documentary feature The Swing.

== Filmography ==
=== Feature films ===
Year	Title	Director	Writer	Producer	Notes
2024	Arzé	Yes	No	No	BJIFF, Tribeca, CIFF

=== Short films ===
Year	Title	Director	Writer	Producer	Notes
2021	"Still ❤ Beirut"	Yes	Yes	No	
2017	"Lilacs"	Yes	Yes	No	Berlinale Talents
2015	"Diaspora"	Yes	Yes	No	

=== Plays ===
Year	Title	Director	Writer	Producer	Notes
2013	The Lesson	Yes	No	No	
