= 14th Beijing International Film Festival =

Chinese film festival in 2024

- Location: Beijing, China
- Founded: 2011
- Awards: Tiantan Award; Future Forward Award
- Hosted by: China Film Administration; Beijing Municipal Government; China Media Group
- Festival date: Opening: April 18, 2024; Closing: April 26, 2024

Beijing International Film Festival
- 15th 13th Beijing International Film Festival

The 14th edition of the Beijing International Film Festival (Chinese: 北京国际电影节), abbreviated BJIFF, was held April 18–26, 2024 in Beijing, China.

The 14th BJIFF received more than 1,500 entries, with 15 films selected for the Tiantan Award and 15 films for the Future Forward Awards. The films come from 18 countries. More than 240 Chinese and international films screened in 27 theaters and venues.

In commemoration of the 50th anniversary of the establishment of diplomatic relations between China and Brazil, this year's edition invited Brazil as the guest country.

== International Jury ==
=== Tiantan Jury ===
The Tiantan Awards (Chinese: 天坛奖) jury include seven Chinese and international filmmakers.

- Emir Kusturica, serving as Jury President
- Carlos Saldanha
- David White
- Kris Phillips
- Jessica Hausner
- Ma Li
- Zhu Yilong

=== Future Forward Jury ===
The Future Forward Awards (Chinese: 注目未来单元), dedicated for first and second features from all over the world, will have a five-member jury, which includes:

- Jerzy Skolimowski, serving as Jury President
- Gu Xiaogang
- Kees Van Oostrum
- Yang Lina
- Yang Zishan

== Tiantan Awards ==
A total of 15 films have been shortlisted for the Tiantan awards.

English title	Director(s)	Production country
A Real Job	Thomas Lilti	France
A Whole Life	Hans Steinbichler	Austria
All the Long Nights	Sho Miyake	Japan
Back to Alexandria	Tamer Ruggli	Switzerland
Death Is a Problem for the Living	Teemu Nikki	Finland
Gold or Shit	Long Fei	China
Guardians of the Formula	Dragan Bjelogrlić	Serbia
I Love You, to the Moon, and Back	Li Weiran	China
Milk	Stefanie Kolk	Netherlands
Not a Word	Hanna Slak	Germany
Stolen	Karan Tejpal	India
Strangers When We Meet	Zhang Guoli	China
The Ant Woman	Betania Cappato & Adrián Suárez	Argentina
The City	Amit Ulman	Israel
The Reeds	Cemil Ağacıkoğlu	Turkey

== Future Forward Awards ==
A total of 15 films have been shortlisted for the Future Forward awards.

English title	Director(s)	Production country
After the Fever	Akira Yamamoto	Japan
Animal/Humano	Alessandro Pugno	Spain
Arzé (Chinese: 阿尔泽)	Mira Shaib	Lebanon
Brief History of a Family	Jianjie Lin	China
Carefree Days	Liang Ming	China
Encounters	Dmitry Moiseev	Russia
The Fantastic Three	Michaël Dichter	France
Fly Me to the Moon	Sasha Chuk	China
The Rapture	Iris Kaltenbäck	France
The Sweet East	Sean Price Williams	United States
Solitude	Ninna Pálmadóttir	Iceland
The Sentence	Fazil Razak	India
Velo Gang	Alex Kälin	Switzerland
Venezia	Rusudan Chkonia	Georgia
Where Echoes Never End	Sophie Gao	China

== Winners of Tiantan Awards ==
Category	Winner(s)	Film
Best Feature Film	Gold or Shit	
Best Director	Karan Tejpal	Stolen
Best Actor	Fan Wei	Strangers When We Meet
Best Actress	Mia Maelzer	Stolen
Best Supporting Actor	Jari Virman	Death Is a Problem for the Living
Best Supporting Actress	Yue Hong	Gold or Shit
Best Screenplay	Jia Huang	Gold or Shit
Best Cinematography	Isshaan Ghosh	Stolen
Best Music	Marco Biscarini	Death Is a Problem for the Living
Best Artistic Contribution	All the Long Nights	
Lifetime Achievement Award	Chen Kaige	
