= List of films about the Lebanese Civil War =

Below is an incomplete list of feature films, television films or television series which include events of the Lebanese Civil War. This list does not include documentaries, short films.

== 1970s ==
Year	Country	Main title (Alternative title)	Original title (Original script)	Director	Subject
1979	Iraq	The Sniper	القناص	Faisal Al-Yasiri	

== 1980s ==
Year	Country	Main title (Alternative title)	Original title (Original script)	Director	Subject
1981	West Germany; France	Circle of Deceit	Die Fälschung; Le Faussaire	Volker Schlöndorff	Drama, War. Based on the novel Die Fälschung.
1981	Lebanon; Tunisia; Belgium	Beirut the Encounter	شرم يكا; La Rencontre	Borhane Alaouié	Drama, War.
1982	France; Lebanon	Little Wars	حروب صغيرة; Les petites guerres	Maroun Bagdadi	Drama, War.
1984	Lebanon; United Kingdom; Belgium; Netherlands	Leila and the Wolves	ليلى والذئاب	Heiny Srour	Drama, History, War.
1985	Lebanon; France; Canada; Argentina	The Razor's Edge	حياة معلقة; Une vie suspendue	Jocelyne Saab	Drama.
1985	Lebanon	The scream	الصرخة	Fouad Sharaf El Din	
1986	United States; Israel	The Delta Force		Menahem Golan	Action, Adventure, Drama, Thriller, War. TWA Flight 847
1986	Israel	Ricochets	שתי אצבעות מצידון	Eli Cohen	Drama, War. 1982 Lebanon War
1987	Israel; United States; West Germany	Deadline		Nathaniel Gutman	Action, Drama, Mystery, War. Sabra and Shatila massacre, 1982 Lebanon War
1989	Israel	Burning Memory	רסיסים	Yossi Somer	Drama. 1982 Lebanon War

== 1990s ==
Year	Country	Main title (Alternative title)	Original title (Original script)	Director	Subject
1990	United States	Navy SEALs		Lewis Teague	Action, Adventure, Thriller.
1990	United States	Hard Act to Follow		Issam B. Makdissy	Comedy.
1991	France; Belgium; Italy	Out of Life	Hors la vie	Maroun Bagdadi	Crime, Drama, War. Based on the book Un otage à Beyrouth. Roger Auque, Lebanon hostage crisis
1991	Israel	Cup Final	גמר גביע	Eran Riklis	Drama, War. 1982 FIFA World Cup, 1982 Lebanon War
1991	Israel	Time for Cherries	עונת הדובדבנים	Haim Bouzaglo	Drama, War. 1982 Lebanon War
1992	Lebanon	The Tornado	الإعصار; Le tourbillon	Samir Habchi	Drama, War.
1994	Lebanon; Canada	Operation Golden Phoenix		Jalal Merhi	Action.
1994	Lebanon	The Time Has Come	آن الآوان; Histoire d'un retour	Jean-Claude Codsi	Drama.
1995	Lebanon; France; Germany; Argentina	Once Upon a Time in Beirut	كان ياما كان في بيروت; Il était une fois Beyrouth	Jocelyne Saab	Drama.
1996	Lebanon; Germany; Ireland	Warshots	Kriegsbilder	Heiner Stadler	Drama.
1998	France; Norway; Lebanon; Belgium	West Beirut	بيروت الغربية; À l'abri les enfants	Ziad Doueiri	Comedy, Drama, Romance, War.
1998	France; Lebanon	Phantom Beirut	أشباح بيروت; Beyrouth fantôme	Ghassan Salhab	Drama.
1999	France; Lebanon	A Civilized People	المتحضرات; Civilisées	Randa Chahal Sabag	Comedy, Drama.

== 2000s ==
Year	Country	Main title (Alternative title)	Original title (Original script)	Director	Subject
2000	Egypt	Aziz, A Hero from the South	بطل من الجنوب	Mohamed Abou-Seif	
2000	France; Lebanon	In the Shadows of the City	طيف المدينة; L'ombre de la ville	Jean Khalil Chamoun	Drama, Romance, War.
2001	United Kingdom; France; Germany; Japan; United States	Spy Game		Tony Scott	Action, Crime, Thriller.
2003	United Kingdom	Blind Flight		John Furse	Drama. Based on the memoirs of An Evil Cradling and Some Other Rainbow. Brian Keenan, John McCarthy, Lebanon hostage crisis
2004	France; Belgium; Lebanon; Germany	In the Battlefields	معارك حب; Dans les champs de bataille	Danielle Arbid	Drama, War.
2004	France; Egypt; Morocco; Denmark; Belgium	The Gate of Sun	باب الشمس; La Porte du soleil	Yousry Nasrallah	Romance, Drama, War. Based on the novel The Gate of Sun.
2004	France; Tunisia; United Kingdom	Deadlines		Ludi Boeken; Michael Alan Lerner	Action, Thriller. Michael Alan Lerner
2004	Lebanon; France	Ring of Fire	زنار النار; La Ceinture de feu	Bahij Hojeij	War. Based on the novel L'Obstiné.
2004	Israel	Summer Story	סיפור קיץ	Shmuel Haimovich	Drama. 1982 Lebanon War
2004	Israel	Delayed Reaction	תגובה מאוחרת	Samuel Calderon	Drama. 1982 Lebanon War
2005	United States; United Arab Emirates	Syriana		Stephen Gaghan	Drama, Thriller. Based on the memoirs of See No Evil.
2005	Germany; United States; France	Lord of War		Andrew Niccol	Crime, Drama.
2005	France; Lebanon; Germany	A Perfect Day	يوم اخر	Joana Hadjithomas and Khalil Joreige	Drama.
2005	Lebanon	The Autobus	بوسطة	Philippe Aractingi	Musical, War.
2009	Israel; France; Germany; United Kingdom	Lebanon	לבנון	Samuel Maoz	Drama, War. 1982 Lebanon War

== 2010s ==
Year	Country	Main title (Alternative title)	Original title (Original script)	Director	Subject
2010	Canada; France	Incendies		Denis Villeneuve	Drama, Mystery, War. Based on the play Incendies.
2010	Lebanon	Stray Bullet	صاصة طايشة	Georges Hachem	Drama.
2010	Lebanon	Here Comes the Rain	شتي يا دني; Que vienne la pluie	Bahij Hojeij	Drama. Lebanon hostage crisis
2011	France; Lebanon; Egypt; Italy; Qatar	Where Do We Go Now?	وهلأ لوين; Et maintenant, on va où	Nadine Labaki	Comedy, Drama.
2012	Canada	The Valley of Tears	La Vallée des larmes	Maryanne Zéhil	Drama. Sabra and Shatila massacre, 1982 Lebanon War
2012	United Kingdom; Israel; France	Zaytoun	זייתון زيتون	Eran Riklis	Adventure, Drama, Thriller, War. 1982 Lebanon War
2015	France	Don't Tell Me the Boy Was Mad	Une histoire de fou	Robert Guédiguian	Drama, History. Based on the autobiography La Bomba.
2015	Iran; Lebanon	The Buried Secret	السر المدفون	Ali Ghaffari	Action, War. South Lebanon conflict (1985–2000)
2015	Lebanon; United Arab Emirates	I'm Not a Martyr	انا مش شهيد	Samah el Kadi	Drama, War.
2015	Canada; Lebanon; United Kingdom	A Louder Silence		Nicolette Saina; J.D. Schroder	Drama, Family, War.
2016	Iran	Standing in the Dust	ایستاده در غبار	Mohammad Hossein Mahdavian	Action, Biography, Drama, War. Ahmad Motevaselian, 1982 kidnapping of Iranian diplomats, Lebanon hostage crisis
2016	France; Lebanon	Fallen from the Sky	Tombé du ciel	Wissam Charaf	Comedy, Drama.
2016	Lebanon	Still Burning	نار من نار	Georges Hachem	Drama.
2018	United States	Beirut		Brad Anderson	Action, Adventure, Crime, Drama, Mystery, Thriller. Lebanon hostage crisis
2019	Lebanon; Norway; France; Qatar	1982		Oualid Mouaness	Drama, History, Romance, War. 1982 Lebanon War
2019	Lebanon	Yesterday went with Yesterday		Issam B. Makdissy	Drama.

== 2020s ==
Year	Country	Main title (Alternative title)	Original title (Original script)	Director	Subject
2021	Lebanon; Canada; France; Qatar	Memory Box		Joana Hadjithomas and Khalil Joreige	Drama.
2022	Cyprus; France; Germany	Tel Aviv/Beirut	Tel Aviv - Beyrouth	Michale Boganim	Drama. 1982 Lebanon War
2023	South Korea	Ransomed	비공식작전	Kim Seong-hun	Action, Comedy, Drama, Mystery, Thriller. Lebanon hostage crisis
2024	France; Luxembourg; Belgium	The Fourth Wall	Le Quatrième Mur	David Oelhoffen	Drama, History, War. Based on the novel Le Quatrième Mur. Antigone, Sabra and Shatila massacre, 1982 Lebanon War

== Television films ==
Year	Country	Main title (Alternative title)	Original title (Original script)	Director	Subject
1988	United States	The Taking of Flight 847: The Uli Derickson Story		Paul Wendkos	Drama. Uli Derickson, TWA Flight 847
1992	United States	Hostages		David Wheatley	Drama. John McCarthy, Brian Keenan, Terry A. Anderson, Thomas Sutherland, Terry Waite, Jill Morrell, Lebanon hostage crisis

== Television series ==
Year	Country	Main title (Alternative title)	Original title (Original script)	Director	Subject
2017	Iran	Standing in the Dust	ایستاده در غبار	Mohammad Hossein Mahdavian	Ahmad Motevaselian, 1982 kidnapping of Iranian diplomats, Lebanon hostage crisis
2023	Israel; United States	Ghosts of Beirut		Greg Barker	History, Thriller. Imad Mughniyeh, 1982 Lebanon War, 1983 US embassy bombing in Beirut, 1983 Beirut barracks bombings, William Francis Buckley, Lebanon hostage crisis, Assassination of Imad Mughniyeh

== Refugees ==
Year	Country	Main title (Alternative title)	Original title (Original script)	Director	Subject
1985	Lebanon	Amani under the rainbow	أماني تحت قوس قزح	Samir A. Khouri	Drama, Musical.
1999	France; Canada; Lebanon	Around the Pink House	البيت الزهري; Autour de la maison rose	Joana Hadjithomas and Khalil Joreige	Comedy, Drama, Romance.
2005	Sweden; Czech Republic; United Kingdom; Denmark; Netherlands	Zozo		Josef Fares	Drama, Family, War.
