= Ziad Abillama =

Lebanese artist

- زياد أبي اللّمع
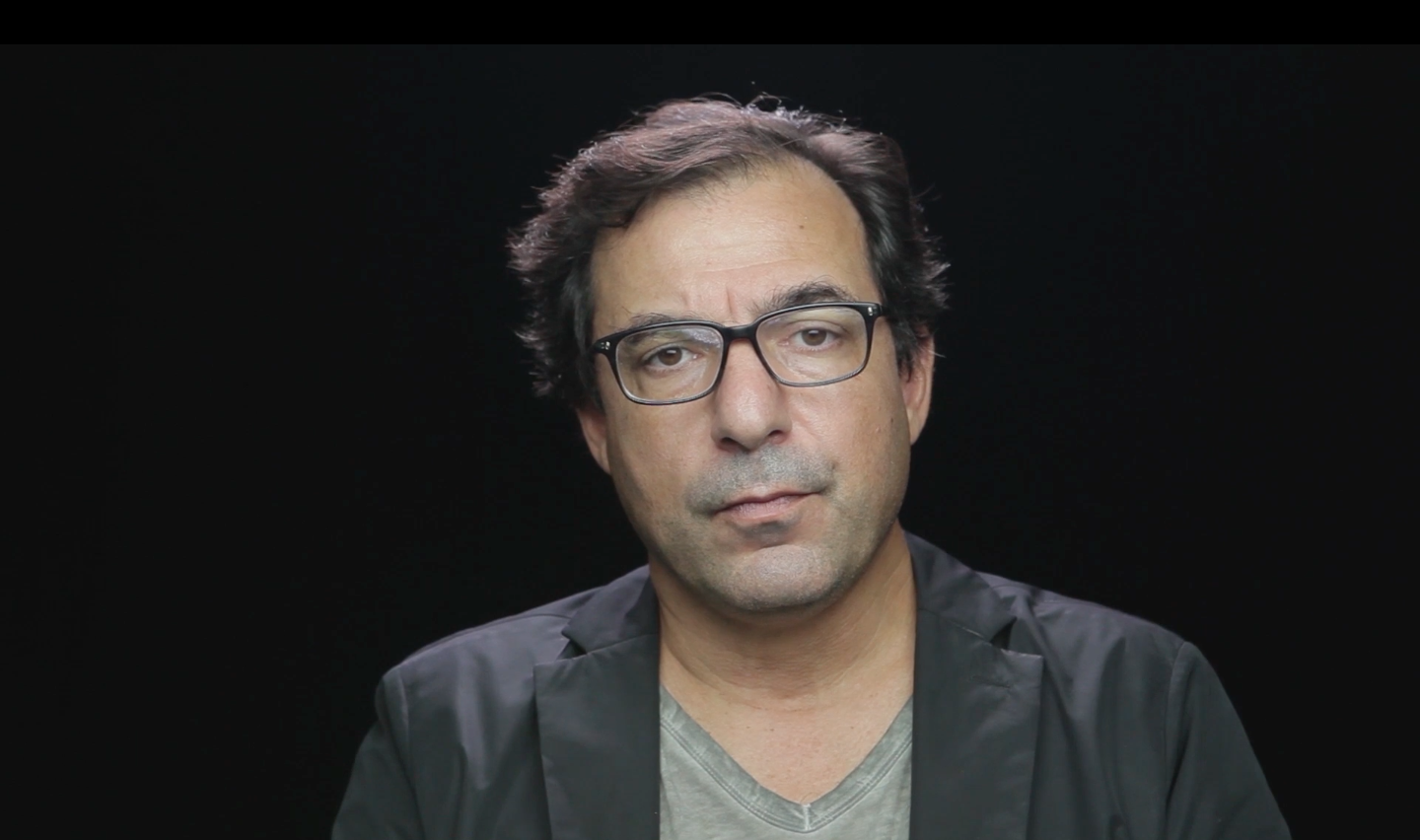
- Abillama in video installation "Reality in the Real"
- Born: 30 July 1969 (age 57); Beirut, Lebanon
- Education: Amherst College (Physics); Rhode Island School of Design (Visual Arts); Académie libanaise des beaux-arts (Video Art)
- Years active: 1992-present
- Notable work: (1992) Where Are We?; (1996) Reconsideration of the Shortcomings of Lebanese Nationalist Ideology – Reconstruction as the Unsettled Debt to Modern Western Philosophy; (1996) Système Full Fill; (2004) Délire Esthétique (Aesthetic Delirium); (2007) Les chaises frustrantes; (2013) Post-Fascism, Post-Imperialism, Post Ziad; (2017) The Twisted Wing of the Airplane King; (2022) Les érections irréductibles; (2022) 1992; (2023) N; (2025) Beirut revisitée + Portraits de 5 femmes
- Spouse: Sibylle Tamer
- Family: Abillama
- Website: ziadabillama.com

Ziad Abillama (Arabic: زياد أبي اللّمع) is a contemporary thinker, author, diarist, visual artist, designer and speaker from Lebanon, born in Beirut in 1969. His work questions the Lebanese civil war and interrogates violence without totalising, blaming, or politicking. He conceptualizes a global reflection on personal and collective experiences that stems from Lebanon's social and political landscape.

In 1987, he left the Lebanese war to study in the USA, at the Rhode Island School of Design and at Amherst College. During his American stay, the first Gulf War started in 1991. Before the much-televised conflict and the interactions around it, 22-year old Abillama started developing his sociopolitical awareness, investigating topics of Arabism, East and West, identity, exoticism, violence, and the other. He completed his studies and returned to Lebanon in 1992, where he now lives and works on his prolific literary production of catalogues, manuscripts and essays – some in the form of a journal.

Abillama is widely recognized for revitalizing Beirut's art scene after the Lebanese civil war, and for presenting its first art installation in 1992. His work in sculpture, installation art, product design, and video art is part of personal collections and permanent exhibitions, and is regularly showcased in solo and group presentations, internationally and in Lebanon (the 54th Venice Biennale, the MAXXI National Museum of 21st Century Arts, the Sursock Museum, Beirut Art Fair, Art Dubai, Modern Art Oxford, New Museum of Contemporary Art, Villa Empain).

== Background and education ==
Ziad Abillama is a descendant of local princes, and an unwitted member of a historically prominent Lebanese Christian Maronite francophone right-wing family. Based on this background, some art critics have interpreted his artistic trajectory as a process of questioning and deconstructing inherited social and cultural privilege, describing his work as "a continuous exercise in 'unlearning' privilege."

As a kid growing up in Lebanon in the 1970's, Abillama was a three-time judo champion and had exhibited a childhood predilection for drawing. He agreed with his parents that he'd pursue a proper job that utilized his drawing skills and do artwork as a hobby to fill idle time.

In 1982, Abillama left Lebanon due to the Lebanese War of 1975 and finished high school at Cushing Academy, a boarding school in Massachusetts. At the time of his graduation, Lebanon remained mired in violence, persuading Abillama to enroll at Amherst College. He declared a physics major since he had agreed with his parents that "art should remain a hobby". However, unwilling to abandon his creative interests completely, Abillama supplemented his core subjects with courses in drawing, printmaking, acting, art history, and museum connoisseurship. By the fall of his sophomore year, he had concluded that art offered "a more immediate way of dealing with life, a way to shuffle reality or the dominant way of organizing life". He enrolled in a trial semester at the Rhode Island School of Design (RISD), risking being financially abandoned by his parents. That spring, he returned to Amherst with a successful transcript from RISD, which substantiated his dedication to the arts and secured his parents' approval of the direction he had taken.

In 2005, he completed and defended his graduation thesis, Faith and Fanaticism (La foi et le fanatisme) in Art & Video at the Académie Libanaise Des Beaux-Arts (ALBA) in Beirut. Here, Abillama explored video as a tool to rationally reconsider the Lebanese past.

== Sociopolitical influence ==
=== The Lebanese War of 1975 ===
It was during his time spent in the US that Abillama was directly confronted with the political implications of the Lebanese Civil War. His personal search for independence, risking parental disapproval and financial abandonment to pursue his childhood aspirations coincided with his developing political awareness. These experiences would guide Abillama's future projects, exploring the legacy of Lebanese cosmopolitanism and its intersection with religion, faith, and nationalism.

=== The Gulf War ===
The much-televised conflict of the Gulf War would turn instrumental to Abillama's awareness and perception of his own identity. Until the war's outbreak in 1991, his Lebanese identity did not make him feel foreign in his New England setting. Immersed in a liberal collegiate community, he embraced the critical approaches to history taught in women's and African American studies departments. He showed interest in courses on gender studies, the representation of the ghetto in American literature, the history of the Vietnam War, the history of Israel, and democracy, culture, and the mass media.

Abillama's critical sensibilities were shaken when the Gulf War thrust the Arab world to the forefront of the American media, and he was confronted with either apathy or hatred towards Arabs. He was shocked, first, by the racism that inhabited his liberal college community, and, second, that this discrimination was directed towards him: he had not considered himself an Arab, but rather of Phoenician descent. "I discovered that I was going to be an Arab no matter what." In addition to his studies, an international group of friends introduced him to the work of Michel Foucault, Jean-François Lyotard and Edward Said. These scholarly studies and readings enabled him to understand there was a confrontation.

Abillama's experience of the Gulf War while attending Amherst College forced a critical self-awareness of one's identity as defined by the discourse of others. When later asked when and where he was born, Abillama repeated "I was born during the Gulf war; I had no identity before that." He was born when he became fascinated yet never completely overcome by the political. While politics could never be entirely divorced from religion or culture, they would all wound up in the same inextricable (and sometimes combustible) nugget.

=== East and West ===
Since 1992, Abillama has been studying the Western scientific fantasy projected onto the East.

"I have the impression that the West constructs a cinematic imaginary and develops wars in which bodies are not valued, as if, for the sake of making war acceptable, one could simply erase the question of physical suffering. People imagine that going to war is like being in a film from which one emerges greater, victorious – but that is not the case. The soldiers who return from war are destroyed. Yet this is something the West does not want to acknowledge."

He writes in his book entitled 1992:
"[...] What one almost never encounters elsewhere, and what I myself have only known in the Levantine city where I was born, is the permanent and intimate coexistence between Christian or Jewish populations steeped in Arab civilization, and Muslim populations resolutely oriented toward the West, its culture, its way of life, its values. [...] The disintegration of the Levant's plural societies has caused an irreparable moral deterioration, one that now affects all human societies and unleashes upon our world previously unimaginable forms of barbarism."

On this topic, he has also made a series of statements:

- The encounter between East and West is, like any sexual relationship, impossible.
- The dazzling meeting of East and West religiously conceals the fantasy of the prostitute and her pimp.
- The unveiling of the East exposes the constitutive void within Western consciousness.
- This encounter between East and West is a simulated form of pleasure and, ultimately, a metaphysical-political fraud.

=== Beirut and Lebanon ===
Lebanon's civil war is not the only Lebanese influence on Ziad Abillama's work. The reconstruction of Beirut, the Syrian occupation, the 2005 assassination of Prime Minister Rafic Hariri, the Cedar Revolution, the 2006 Hezbollah-Israel war, the continuing series of assassinations, the 17 October Revolution in 2019, and the August 4, 2020, double explosion in the Beirut Port all shaped his body of work.

For example, in the Cedar Revolution, the chain of mass demonstrations triggered by the assassination of former Lebanese Prime Minister Rafic Hariri, Abillama directed confrontational questions about the future of Lebanon toward protesters and recorded their responses in a low-quality video. This video then became part of a group exhibition at Modern Art Oxford.

Similarly, the 2006 Hezbollah-Israel war inspired "Frustrating Chairs", sculptures that embody falsehood and uselessness at a time when people were fixated on the triumph of their own views. The 2019 civil protests of the 17 October Revolution inspired a series of published texts, and a video interrogated the framing of the double explosion that occurred in the Beirut Port on August 4, 2020.

Abillama's sense of challenge resonates with the anxieties of the Lebanese people as he celebrates his artwork while acknowledging its specific and relevant connection to the Lebanese experience.

== Artistic reception ==
Ziad Abillama's work has often been considered revolutionary and transgressive.

=== First post-war artistic public intervention ===
Widely cited by critics as the first postwar artistic public intervention in Lebanon, Ziad Abillama's 1992 beach installation was staged on a rubbish-cleared section of San Balech beach, north of Beirut, and then left to decay. Surrounded by barbed wire and lit with a generator, the work displayed metal scraps, discarded missiles, and missile-derived sculptures, variously arranged in a shopping trolley, a glass case, or as hybrid cage-like chairs.

Documented most clearly in Walid Sadek's essay "From Excavation to Dispersion: Configurations of Installation Art in Postwar Lebanon", the project is described as a "sufficient condensation of ideas and methodological hybridization for it to be considered a crucial event and a violent restart of the arts in the postwar period."

Critics argue that, in transforming instruments of destruction into objects of contemplation, the work turned the experience of violence into material for historical and aesthetic reflection, echoing the importance of aesthetics in terms of transitional justice.

=== The Beirut School ===
Ziad Abillama is among the pioneering figures of Lebanon's post-civil war era, often linked to the loosely defined "Beirut School," which emerged in the 1990s including Joana Hadjithomas, Khalil Joreige, Lamia Joreige, Rabih Mroué, Walid Raad, Marwan Rechmaoui, Walid Sadek, Jayce Salloum, Lina Saneh, Jalal Toufic and Akram Zaatari. This generation is known for reshaping contemporary Lebanese art by examining modern history, imagery, and political systems, particularly through film, documentary, and narrative forms. As art critic Kaelen Wilson-Goldie notes, they helped initiate a long-term, wide-ranging conversation on how history is constructed, mediated, and often distorted by images and narratives, and how art can challenge it.

Abillama, like his peers, approaches art as a form of critical historiography, questioning memory, archives, and representation rather than documenting events. His work transforms violence into material for reflection, and engages with themes of repression, latency, disaster, and withdrawal. Alongside others, he redefined what it means to witness in art after nearly two decades of unfinished conflict and within a neoliberal environment where state and private interests converged.

=== Curators and critics ===
For curators and critics outside Lebanon, Beirut entered the contemporary art world around 2002, when the city began to experience a series of international projects invested in an art scene that purportedly operated in a liminal zone, the product of a war-torn history that nonetheless promised an alternative to institutional norms. In the aftermath of nearly two decades of violence, foreign curators lauded a set of critical practices (including those of Ziad Abillama and Walid Sadek) that showcased the possibilities of an activist art. The radicality of the art produced by this first generation of postwar artists can only be understood by tracing a longer history of art in Lebanon than the one that emerges from the rubble left by the civil war.

=== Public clash ===
The early public work type of Abillama presented instances of public 'clash' between what constitutes art and what does not. Post-civil war artists and their politics dabbled with the question of an anti-monumentality as an anti-aesthetics, and a political formalism that bids self-reflexivity on the category of art itself and its representation, made urgent in the then current climate. The former head of the Lebanese Artist's Association of Painters and Sculptors, Maroun El-Hakim, launched a virulent attack against the likes of Ziad Abillama and Walid Sadek, labelling their work a "foreign threat to the art establishment, unmonumental, and nearly deliberately 'degenerate'". Criticism of installation art being a foreign threat and un-Lebanese was also directed in 1999 by the former head Maroun El-Hakim in the daily Al Mustaqbal, as cited by Sadek, "From Excavation to Dispersion: Configurations of Installation Art in Postwar Lebanon".

== Notable artistic works ==
In the 1990s, Ziad Abillama's projects critically engaged with the civil war's legacy, seeking to redefine art's social function postwar. His early work focused on the civil war's specific history and broader representational concerns, marking a critical turn in Lebanese art.

Deceived by the over-politicisation of Lebanese youth, he shrank back from politics in art and returned from 1998 to 2003 to sculpture and design. But this soon appeared to be a dead end. If politicisation in art is a problem, he now chose to deal with it instead of escaping it. These are the stakes of his involvement in video from 2003 to 2005.

- Direct Expression: Forum for rethinking the Israeli/Palestinian conflict; Massachusetts; 1991
- Installation on the first Gulf War; Massachusetts; 1991
- Installation on the necessity to map out the Lebanese war as a site for the reappropriation of Lebanese consciousness; Beirut; 1992
- Participation in the contest for the reconstruction of downtown Beirut with the architect Bernard Khoury; Beirut; 1992
- Where Are We?; Saint Balech Beach, Beirut; 1992
- Sanayeh: The Impossible Community; Sanayeh Garden, Beirut; 1995
- The political unconscious of exotic travels; Berlin; 1996
- Reconsideration of the Shortcomings of Lebanese Nationalist Ideology – Reconstruction as the Unsettled Debt to Modern Western Philosophy; Salon des Artistes Décorateurs, Beirut; 1996
- Rester un Arabe pour l'émancipation des Juifs: témoignage et manipulation; Jerusalem; 1996
- Système Full Fill; Beirut; 1996
- Sculpture exhibition. No politics.; Beirut; 1998
- Untitled; Épreuve d'artiste Gallery, Beirut; 1999
- ARTUEL Salon international de l'art contemporain; Beirut; 2000
- Délire Esthétique (Aesthetic Delirium); Épreuve d'artiste Gallery, Beirut; 2004
- Sculpture exhibition. No politics.; Beirut; 2004
- Video as a tool to reconsider rationally the Lebanese past.; Beirut; 2005
- Sexuality and desire as alternatives to pathological warfare.; Beirut; 2005
- Why Don't You Stop Dying; Né à Beyrouth, Beirut; 2005
- Nature and Drugs; FairPlay Video Festival, Berlin; 2006
- Out of Beirut; Modern Art Oxford, London; 2006
- Les chaises frustrantes; Art Lounge, Beirut; 2007
- La défaite de l'exotisme; Faqra Club; 2008
- Images: fixe, mobile, animée; Institut français du Liban, Beirut; 2009
- The Future of a Promise; Magazzini del Sale, 54th Venice Biennale, Venice; 2011
- Art Dubai; Dubai; 2011
- Museum as Hub: Beirut Art Center: Due to unforeseen events...; Beirut Art Center, Beirut; 2011
- Museum as Hub: Beirut Art Center: Due to unforeseen events...; New Museum of Contemporary Art, New York; 2011
- Art is the Answer; Villa Empain, Brussels; 2012
- Post-Fascism, Post-Imperialism, Post Ziad; Atelier Ziad Abillama, Dbayeh; 2013
- Art is the Answer; Beirut Exhibition Center, Beirut; 2013
- Beirut Art Fair; Beirut; 2014
- Art Dubai; Dubai; 2016
- Beirut Art Fair; Beirut; 2017
- Croquez Monsieur, chères Mesdames; Imago Mundi Collection, Treviso; 2017
- The Twisted Wing of the Airplane King; Agial Art Gallery, Beirut; 2017
- Home Beirut. Sounding the Neighbors; Galleria 3, MAXXI Museo nazionale delle arti XXI secolo, Rome; 2017
- Beirut Art Fair; Beirut; 2018
- The Horror, The Horror, The Horror – Harald Szeemann and the Archive; AUB, Beirut; 2018
- Reality in the Real: Ziad Abillama, FAP; London; 2021
- La colonne et les chaises allégoriques; Arthaus, Beirut; 2021
- Les érections irréductibles; Agial Art Gallery, Beirut; 2022
- Panorama de la sculpture au Liban; MACAM, Lebanon; 2023
- Intimate Garden Scene; Sursock Museum; 2023–2024

== Literary production ==
Abillama's work is informed by an interest in dichotomies and structures of domination that shape the world, including the East in relation to the West, woman in relation to man, and the self in relation to the other. In addition to his artistic practice, working with great erudition, historical accumulation, reflection, and distance, he is the author of several texts, some published and others forthcoming.

- Les érections irréductibles (catalogue published in 2022)
- 1992 (published on 20 October 2022)
- Mon Expo de Chaises Chez Debs (catalogue published on 24 November 2022)
- Les nouveaux isolationnistes (published on 1 December 2022)
- N (published on 1 October 2023)
- Beirut revisitée + Cinq portraits de femmes (published on 3 October 2025)
- Femmes qui ne mènent nulle part (forthcoming)

== See also ==
- List of Lebanese artists
