= Tina Baz =

Franco-Lebanese film editor

Tina Baz, (also credited as Tina Baz le Gal) is a Franco-Lebanese film editor. She edited Adolescents for which she won the César Award for Best Editing at the 46th César Awards. She was nominated for Best Editing at the 2008 Hong Kong Film Awards.

She is notably a regular collaborator of Naomi Kawase and Sébastien Lifshitz.

== Filmography ==
=== Film ===
Year	Title	Director	Notes
1997	Fred	Pierre Jolivet	
1999	Around the Pink House	Joana Hadjithomas and Khalil Joreige	
1999	Retour à la vie	Pascal Baeumler	
2000	La Mécanique des femmes	Jérôme de Missolz	
2000	Poetical Refugee	Abdellatif Kechiche	
2002	Les Diables	Christophe Ruggia	
2004	Le Grand Voyage	Ismaël Ferroukhi	
2004	Lila Says	Ziad Doueiri	
2005	Oublier Cheyenne	Valérie Minetto	
2005	A Perfect Day	Joana Hadjithomas and Khalil Joreige	
2006	Running on Empty	Bülent Akinci	
2006	Suely in the Sky	Karim Aïnouz	
2007	Young Yakuza	Jean-Pierre Limosin	
2007	The Mourning Forest	Naomi Kawase	
2007	Mad Detective	Johnnie To and Wai Ka-fai	
2007	Childhoods		
2007	Ce que mes yeux ont vu	Laurent de Bartillat	
2008	Our Forbidden Places	Leïla Kilani	
2009	Queen to Play	Caroline Bottaro	
2009	Written By	Wai Ka-fai	
2009	Fix ME	Raed Andoni	
2009	Mine, My Life Behind the Scenes	Valérie Minetto	
2011	Hanezu	Naomi Kawase	
2011	On the Edge	Leïla Kilani	
2011	Dans la tourmente	Christophe Ruggia	
2012	Les Invisibles	Sébastien Lifshitz	
2012	The Lebanese Rocket Society	Joana Hadjithomas and Khalil Joreige	
2012	Elena	Petra Costa	
2013	Bambi	Sébastien Lifshitz	
2013	Comment j'ai détesté les maths	Olivier Peyon	
2014	Still the Water	Naomi Kawase	
2015	Sweet Bean	Naomi Kawase	
2015	Olmo & the Seagull	Petra Costa and Lea Glob	
2015	Looking for Her	Ounie Lecomte	
2016	Ismyrne	Joana Hadjithomas and Khalil Joreige	
2017	Une vie ailleurs	Olivier Peyon	
2017	Radiance	Naomi Kawase	
2017	Sparring	Samuel Jouy	
2019	The Edge of Democracy	Petra Costa	
2019	Adolescents	Sébastien Lifshitz	
2020	True Mothers	Naomi Kawase	
2020	Malu	Edmund Yeo	
2021	Memory Box	Joana Hadjithomas and Khalil Joreige	
2021	Tokyo Shaking	Olivier Peyon	
2022	Casa Susanna	Sébastien Lifshitz	
2023	Birdland	Leïla Kilani	
2023	Bonnard, Pierre and Marthe	Martin Provost	
2025	All That's Left Of You	Cherien Dabis	
2025	Yakushima's Illusion	Naomi Kawase	
