= The Beirut School =

The “Beirut School” is a group of artists who emerged in the 1990s, including Ziad Abillama, Joana Hadjithomas, Khalil Joreige, Lamia Joreige, Rabih Mroué, Walid Raad, Marwan Rechmaoui, Walid Sadek, Jayce Salloum, Lina Saneh, Jalal Toufic, and Akram Zaatari.

These artists have developed a legacy of investigating the possibilities and intricacies of Lebanon's contemporary histories, imageries and political systems, especially across moving image, documentary and narrative practices.

According to art critic Kaelen Wilson-Goldie, while these artists’ “unity of purpose” has been somewhat overplayed, “together they initiated a long-term, far-ranging conversation about the mechanisms of history and the ability of contemporary art to challenge or subvert it.”

These Lebanese artists emerged after Lebanon's civil war and assumed the role of critical historians, using art to question memory, archives, and representation rather than to document events directly. Through experimental practices developed in Beirut’s post-war cultural scene, these artists expose how history is constructed, mediated, and often distorted by images and narratives. Their work transforms violence and conflict into tools for critical reflection, positioning art as an active site of historical inquiry rather than passive remembrance.

They reckon with questions of representation in art, and reconfigure the role of witnessing in the aftermath of nearly two decades of an unfinished war, and an ossified milieu under rampant neoliberalism that was neatly twinning state and private sector interest.

== See also ==
- List of Lebanese artists
