= Cedar rocket =

Cedar rocket صواريخ أرز
- Type: Surface-to-air missile
- Place of origin: Lebanon

Production history
- Designer: Haigazian University
- Designed: 1960
- Variants: Arz1, Arz2, Arz2(2, -2A, -2B, -2C), Arz3, Arz4, Arz5, Arz6, Arz7, Arz8

Specifications
- Mass: 1250 kg
- Length: 6.80 m

The Cedar rockets (Arabic: صواريخ أرز) are a series of missiles developed by Haigazian College and the Lebanese army during the 1960s. There were three types: Arz 1, Arz 2, and Arz 3. During the 21st century the Arz4 missile was developed. The missile was stopped from production because it had close destruction abilities of French army missiles at that time (1960s). However, international worries towards the development in the abilities of Lebanese missiles began to surface, so Lebanon was put under pressure to stop producing these rockets by Western countries.

== Single-stage Rockets ==
In November 1960, Professor Manoug Manougian and a group of students formed Haigazian College Rocket Society (HCRS). They started research into single and multistage solid fuel rockets with a budget of 750 LBP donated by MP Emile Bustani. Due to lack of proper equipment, the group was obliged to resort to flight testing without any fuel tests in the laboratories.

In April 1961, after several failures, a single-stage rocket was launched to an altitude of about one kilometer. Improvements on the solid fuel system increased the altitude to two kilometers.

== Multi-stage Rockets ==
As a result of these experiments, the Lebanese President Fuad Chehab granted financial assistance of ten and fifteen thousand LBP to HCRS for 1961 and 1962 respectively.

During the academic year 1961–1962, HCRS worked on two-stage rockets, and improved the design. On May 25, 1962, HCRS-7 (Arz 1) was launched to a height of 11500 m, and the Lebanese Army was responsible for security. That summer, two more rockets were launched to a height of 20 km.

Due to the successes of the HCRS, new members joined, and the Lebanese Rocket Society (LRS) was formed in 1962.

- On November 21, 1962, Arz 3, a three-stage solid propellant rocket, was launched. It had a length of 6.80 m and a mass of 1250 kg.
- In the summer of 1964, an accident occurred during launch, which hospitalized two students and caused all launches to end.
- It has been revealed, after several years, from a report addressed to President Fouad Chehab, the personal friend of President Charles de Gaulle of France sent a message to the Lebanese President informing him that Lebanon has proved its abilities in the scientific field, and the missile has the potential of putting Lebanon at risk. President Chehab took that advice, and stopped on the impact of practical experience to launch rocket.
