= Bahij Hojeij =

Bahij Hojeij is a Lebanese film director and screenwriter, born in Zahle, Lebanon in 1948.

== Selective filmography ==
=== Cinema ===
- "Ring of Fire" (2003)

- "Fire Belt" (95 min), 2004
- "Here Comes the Rain" (100 min), 2010

- "Good Morning" (86 Min) 2018

=== Television ===
- "Al Oumbachi" (1987) TV series based on the work of Lebanese writer Maroun Abboud. 10 episodes of 50 minutes produced and broadcast by Lebanese Broadcasting Corporation (LBC).
- “Beyrouth, Paris, Beyrouth” (1989) About the Lebanese community in France during the civil war of Lebanon.

=== Documentaries ===
- "The Green Line"(40 min), 1998.
- "Beyrouth, le dialogue des ruines". (52 min), 1993.
- "Défi à l'oubli" (1996–1997) La Direction Générale des Antiquités. 40 minutes réhabilitation du Musée National de Beyrouth.
- "Beyrouth dévoile ses trésors." (1997) produit par l'UNESCO Beyrouth
- “Kidnapped” (1998) Documentaire 52 min sur les 17 000 disparus de la guerre au Liban
- “Lebanon, messages from a holy land”(2000). Documentaire de 35 minutes
- “Les moissons de la mémoire” (2001) le Ministère de la Culture Un documentaire de 15 minutes sur les Archives Nationales
- “Cités d’Orient, Beyrouth“ (2003)
- "The Maameltein Bridge" (2006).

== Prix et distinctions ==
=== Cinema ===
- "Fire Belt" (95 min)
Silver Pheasant Award, Kerala Film Festival (India), 2004
FIPRESCI Award (International Cinema Ciritcs Federation) Kerala Film Festival (India), 2004
Best female supporting actor : Julia Kassar, Carthage Film Festival, Tunisia, 2004

Documentaries
- "Défi à l'oubli" (1997) Best documentary. Beirut film festival, 1997
- "Kidnapped" (1998) Prix CMCA. Best Mediterranean documentary, Palerma, Italy 1998
