= Around the Pink House =

1999 film

- Directed by: Joana Hadjithomas; Khalil Joreige
- Written by: Joana Hadjithomas; Khalil Joreige
- Produced by: Anne-Cécile Berthomeau; Edouard Berthomeau; Jean Dansereau; Anne-Cécil Mauriat; Edouard Mauriat
- Starring: Hanane Abboud; Fadi Abi Samra; Anne-Marie Afif
- Cinematography: Pierre David
- Edited by: Tina Baz
- Music by: Robert M. Lepage
- Distributed by: Canal Horizons
- Release date: 15 December 1999 (France)
- Running time: 92 minutes
- Countries: France; Canada; Lebanon
- Languages: French; Arabic

Around the Pink House (French: Autour de la maison rose / Arabic: البيت الزهري) is a 1999 film co-directed by Joana Hadjithomas and Khalil Joreige. It was an international co-production between France, Canada, and Lebanon. It was Lebanon's official Best Foreign Language Film submission at the 72nd Academy Awards but did not receive a nomination.

== Cast ==
- Joseph Bon Nassar
- Mireille Safa
- Chadi El Zein
- Hassan Mrad
- Ziad Said
- Rabih Mroué
- Aline Aoun
- Tony Balabane
- Hassan Ferat
- Issam Bou Khaled
- Zeina Saab de Melero
- Georges Kehdy
- Hanane Abboud
- Nagi Sourati
- Fadi Abi Samra
- Maurice Maalouf

== Plot ==
Two families, who fled their villages amid the Lebanese Civil War, have taken up unauthorized residence in Beirut's Pink House. Eleven years later, the house's legal owner announces plans to redevelop the house into a shopping center, throwing the house's residents and the rest of the neighborhood into turmoil.

== Production ==
Following the 2000 San Francisco International Film Festival at which the film was shown, co-director Khalil Joreige gave an interview to David Walsh for the World Socialist Web Site. Joreige stated that due to lack of support and a small domestic market, most Lebanese films (including Around the Pink House) were created through international co-productions. Joreige and Hadjithomas were inspired to make the film after producing an exhibit at the Institut du monde arabe on the subject of ruins. The film's set was specifically designed in order to avoid the appearance of a typical house but closer to "something more fictional, more impossible." Joreige cited Contempt by Jean-Luc Godard as a vital inspiration and film worthy of admiration.

== Reception ==
The film received mixed to positive reviews. Philippe Azoury, writing for Libération, characterized Hadjithomas and Joreige's film as having chosen to soften their sadness or anger by creating a "comedy of conversation" and cautioned viewers against missing the film's underlying significance. Jacques Mandelbaum, writing for Le Monde, thought the film looked toward commedia all'italiana in style but lost sight of its goal.

Dennis Harvey, writing in Variety, stated that the film "expertly sustains myriad narrative strands through amusing waves of gossip, infighting and sabotage" but that "individual parts are more effective than the whole." Rebecca Naughten wrote in Eye For Film that the film "doesn't sugarcoat the almost-inevitable triumph of Big Business" in a review that gave Around the Pink House three out of five stars.
