= Jeanne Lapoirie =

French cinematographer (born 1963)

- Born: Paris, France
- Occupation: Cinematographer
- Years active: 1984–present

Jeanne Lapoirie is a French cinematographer. She began her career in the 1980s, working as a camera operator and cinematographer with directors like Luc Besson, Agnès Varda, and Robin Campillo. She is also known for her collaborations with André Téchiné and François Ozon. She was nominated for a César Award for Best Cinematography for her work in Ozon's 8 femmes in 2003 and Michael Kohlhaas in 2014.

== Selected filmography ==
Year	Title	Notes
1994	Wild Reeds	
1996	Thieves	
1996	Full Speed	
1999	Set Me Free	
2000	Under the Sand	
2000	Confusion of Genders	
2000	Water Drops on Burning Rocks	
2002	8 Women	Nominated - César Award for Best Cinematography
2003	The Very Merry Widows	
2003	It's Easier for a Camel...	
2004	They Came Back	
2005	Time to Leave	
2005	A Perfect Day	
2006	Cabaret Paradis	
2007	Actrices	
2008	Parc	
2008	La Possibilité d'une île	
2009	Ricky	
2009	Independencia	Nominated - Gawad Urian Award for Best Cinematography
2010	A Distant Neighborhood	
2011	My Little Princess	
2012	The Lebanese Rocket Society	Documentary
2013	Eastern Boys	
2013	A Castle in Italy	
2013	Age of Uprising: The Legend of Michael Kohlhaas	Nominated - César Award for Best Cinematography
2014	Gett: The Trial of Viviane Amsalem	
2015	Summertime	
2017	BPM (Beats per Minute)	Nominated - César Award for Best Cinematography
2018	An Impossible Love	
2019	The Summer House	
2020	Benedetta	
2020	Honey Cigar	
2023	Red Island / L'Ile Rouge	
2024	The Mohican	
2024	Planet B	post-production
2025	Enzo	
