= Go Home (film) =

2015 film

- Directed by: Jihane Chouaib
- Starring: Golshifteh Farahani
- Release date: 5 October 2015 (BIFF)
- Running time: 98 minutes
- Countries: France; Switzerland; Belgium; Lebanon
- Languages: French; Arabic

Go Home is a 2015 international co-production film directed by Jihane Chouaib.

== Cast ==
- Golshifteh Farahani - Nada
- Maximilien Seweryn - Sam
- Wissam Fares - Chadi
- Julia Kassar - Colette
- Mireille Maalouf - Nour
- François Nour - Jalal
- Mohamad Akil
