= Les Diables =

- Theatrical poster
- Directed by: Christophe Ruggia
- Written by: Olivier Lorelle; Christophe Ruggia
- Produced by: Bertrand Faivre
- Starring: Adèle Haenel; Vincent Rottiers
- Cinematography: Éric Guichard
- Edited by: Tina Baz-Legal
- Music by: Fowzi Guerdjou
- Distributed by: Océan Films
- Release date: 11 September 2002 (France)
- Running time: 105 minutes
- Country: France
- Language: French

Les Diables (The Devils) is a 2002 French drama film from director Christophe Ruggia starring Adèle Haenel and Vincent Rottiers.

== Plot ==
Joseph is a 12-year-old boy running from a series of children's homes with his autistic sister, Chloé, in tow. Chloé cannot bear to be touched and follows only Joseph's commands. Joseph is fiercely protective of her as they seek to find their way to the parents he believes abandoned them and who they never knew. They cling to a false memory of a picturesque house, which Chloé is able to construct using pieces of colored glass she carries. Their latest attempt soon fails when they are caught and returned to yet another care home. Joseph immediately steals from room-mates and demands the two be left alone. Chloé makes progress, however, with her carer, who assesses her condition and improves her care. Joseph resents this interference while his theft is discovered by his room-mate, Karim, who develops a begrudging respect for him. Their situation worsens when a figure from their past appears and reveals a secret which enrages Joseph who lashes out and flees again with Chloé.

Pursued through Marseilles as Joseph continues to steal, Chloé is determined to find the home she pictures so vividly. They meet up with Karim, who has also run away and has big plans about how he and Joseph can make money. Chloé leads them to a house she believes to be home. They break in and, while Karim robs it, Chloé lovingly embraces her new surroundings. Joseph sees a threat in this and sets fire to the house. Chloé and Joseph share a moment where for the first time she allows Joseph to take her hand as reassurance she will not leave him. The police arrive, with Joseph hysterically dragged away while Chloé is placed in a secure psychiatric facility. Without Chloé, Joseph descends further into depression and violence, even attempting suicide. His life is saved by Karim, whose gang attack Joseph's accompanying officers and free him. Karim knows where Chloé is detained, and the gang continues vandalizing on the journey.

Joseph frees Chloé, and they hide in a city tunnel. Joseph pledges to make money and buy her a home, again stealing. Stopped by the police one night, Joseph stabs one and escapes the pursuit. He returns to his hideout only to find that Chloé has torn up the money he has acquired. Police arrive, and they escape again, though Joseph is injured. Joseph asks for help at a house claiming he was in an accident. The film ends with Chloé and Joseph playing on the garden swing.

== Cast ==
- Adèle Haenel as Chloé
- Vincent Rottiers as Joseph
- Rochdy Labidi as Karim
- Jacques Bonnaffé as Doran
- Aurélia Petit as Joseph's mother
- Galamelah Lagra as Djamel
- Frédéric Pierrot as The man in the house
- Dominique Reymond as The director

== Production ==
Director Christophe Ruggia said the love scene between Adèle Haenel and Vincent Rottiers took them just enough time to shoot it: there is only one take.

In 2019, Haenel gave an interview claiming that director Christophe Ruggia had sexually harassed her, including unwanted touching and kisses, from the time she was 12 to 15 after casting her in the film. Several crew members stepped forward to support her accusations and to say that Ruggia had purposefully isolated Haenel and treated her inappropriately during filming. In 2020, Ruggia was officially charged with sexually harassing Haenel. In 2025, he was convicted of sexual assault on a child.
