= Phantom Beirut =

Phantom Beirut - أشباح بيروت
- Directed by: Ghassan Salhab
- Written by: Ghassan Salhab
- Produced by: Aline Pelissier; Ghassan Salhab
- Starring: Aouni Kawas; Darina El Joundi; Rabih Mroue; Carol Abboud; Hassan Farhat; Younes Aoude; Ahmad Ali Zein; Nada Ali Zein
- Cinematography: Jérôme Peyrebrune
- Music by: Toufic Farroukh
- Release date: 1998
- Country: Lebanon
- Language: Arabic

Phantom Beirut (Arabic: أشباح بيروت ashbah bayroot) is a 1998 Lebanese film by the Lebanese director Ghassan Salhab.

== Plot ==
At the end of the 1980s, it seems the Lebanese conflict will never end. Khalil, a man in his thirties, returns to Beirut after many years. More than ten years earlier, during a battle, he took advantage of the confusion and pretended he was dead. He then disappeared and adopted a false identity. But Beirut is a small town, and people are increasingly beginning to recognize him.

== Cast ==
- Aouni Kawas
- Darina El Joundi
- Rabih Mroué
- Carol Abboud
- Hassan Farhat
- Younes Aoude
- Ahmad Ali Zein
- Nada Ali Zein
