= A Perfect Day (2005 film) =

- Film poster
- Directed by: Joana Hadjithomas; Khalil Joreige
- Written by: Joana Hadjithomas; Khalil Joreige
- Produced by: Anne-Cécile Berthomeau and Edouard Mauriat for Mille et une Productions (France)
- Starring: Ziad Saad; Julia Kassar; Alexandra Kahwagi
- Cinematography: Jeanne Lapoirie
- Edited by: Tina Baz
- Music by: Scrambled Eggs: Charbel Haber, Marc Codsi, Tony Elieh,Said EliehSoap Kills, Zeid Hamdan & Yasmine Hamdan
- Release date: 2005
- Running time: 88 minutes
- Countries: Lebanon; France; Germany
- Language: Arabic

A Perfect Day (Arabic: يوم اخر, Yawmon Akhar) is a 2005 Lebanese film directed by Joana Hadjithomas and Khalil Joreige. The soundtrack was done by the band Scrambled Eggs, Soap Kills and others.

== Plot ==
Malek, a 26-year-old man who suffers from sleep disorders, is obsessed with thoughts of his ex-girlfriend Zeina. Stuck in a traffic jam, Malek catches a fleeting glance of the beautiful Zeina the woman he loves. Tapping text messages into his mobile phone he desesperately tries to get through to her, but she no longer wants to see him. She vanishes into the throng of midday Beirut traffic. The young man has a syndrome which interrupts his breathing during sleep. Whenever he stops moving, he dozes off adding to his disorientation. His mother Claudia has still not accepted his father’s disappearance after 15 years. She stays at home should her husband return, Malek drives around the city alone in his car. Each of them trying to live with a void of lost love. But today may be the “perfect day” to lay their ghosts to rest. Malek is taking his hesitant mother to declare her husband officially dead in the “absence of a body”. She struggles on this day, because the courts will rule her husband officially a dead man since his disappearance more than 15 years ago, along with 17,000 other men who also disappeared during the Lebanese war. And that evening, in a trendy nightclub where the young of Beirut go to dance and forget their troubles, Zeina looks ready to give Malek a second shot at the love he so yearns for.

== Cast ==
- Ziad Saad as Malek
- Julia Kassar as Claudia
- Alexandra Kahwagi as Zeina
- Rabih Mroué
- Carole Schoucair
- Joseph Nader
- Pascale Sekkar
- Joseph Sassine

== Music ==
- Scrambled Eggs: Charbel Haber, Marc Codsi, Tony Elieh, Said Elieh
- Soap Kills: Zeid Hamdan & Yasmine Hamdan
