= Armenag Haigazian =

Armenian academic (1870–1921)

- Արմենակ Հայկազեան
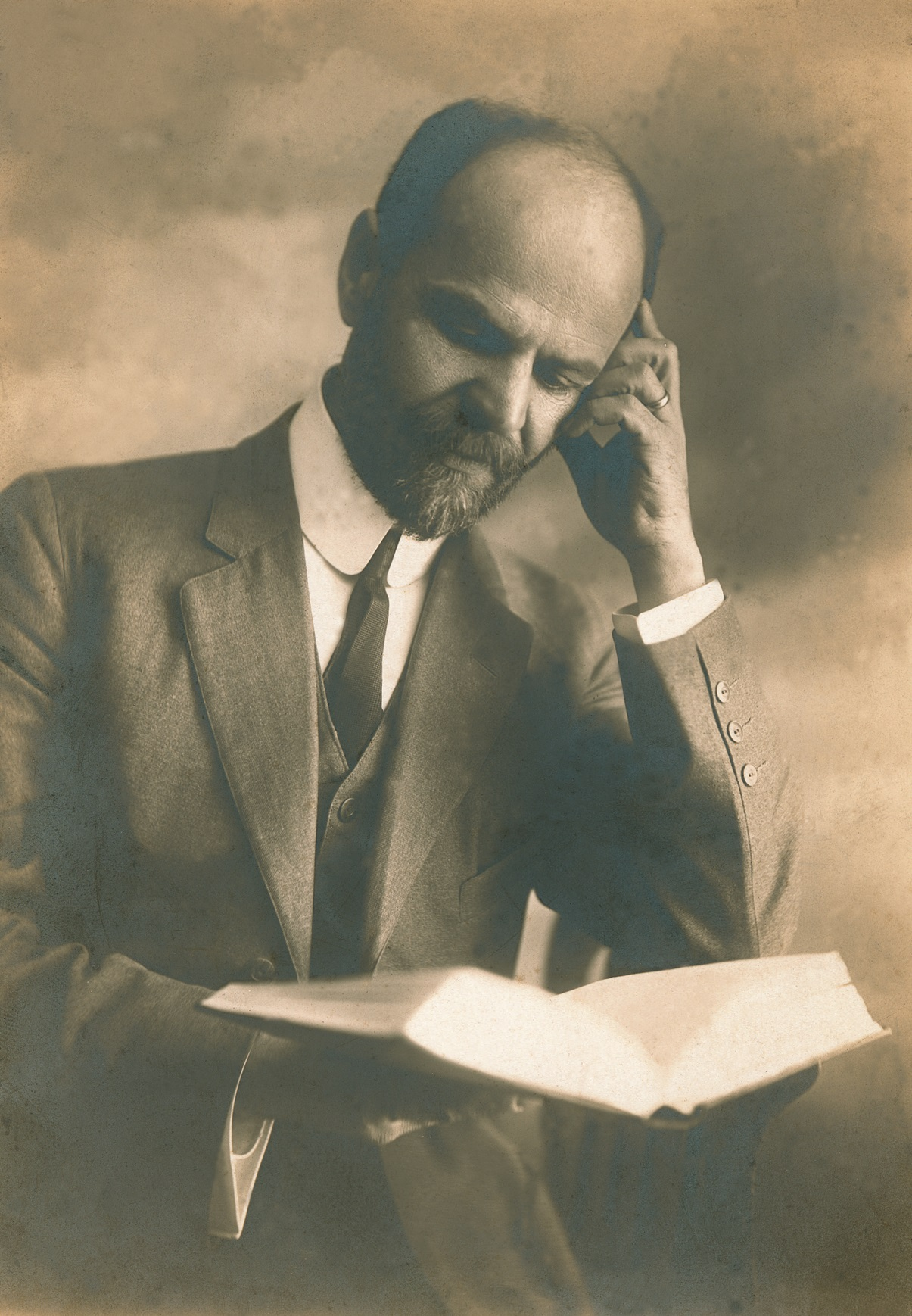
- Born: September 22, 1870; Hadjin, Cilicia
- Died: July 7, 1921 (aged 50); Mezereh, Harpoot
- Education: Central Turkey College (B.A.); Hartford Theological Seminary (S.T.B.); Yale University (PhD)
- Occupations: College administrator; Theologian; Educator Musician
- Spouse: Matilda Surpouhi Garabedian (m. 1902)
- Children: 6
- Parents: Harutune Haigazian; Mary Tavonkian

Signature
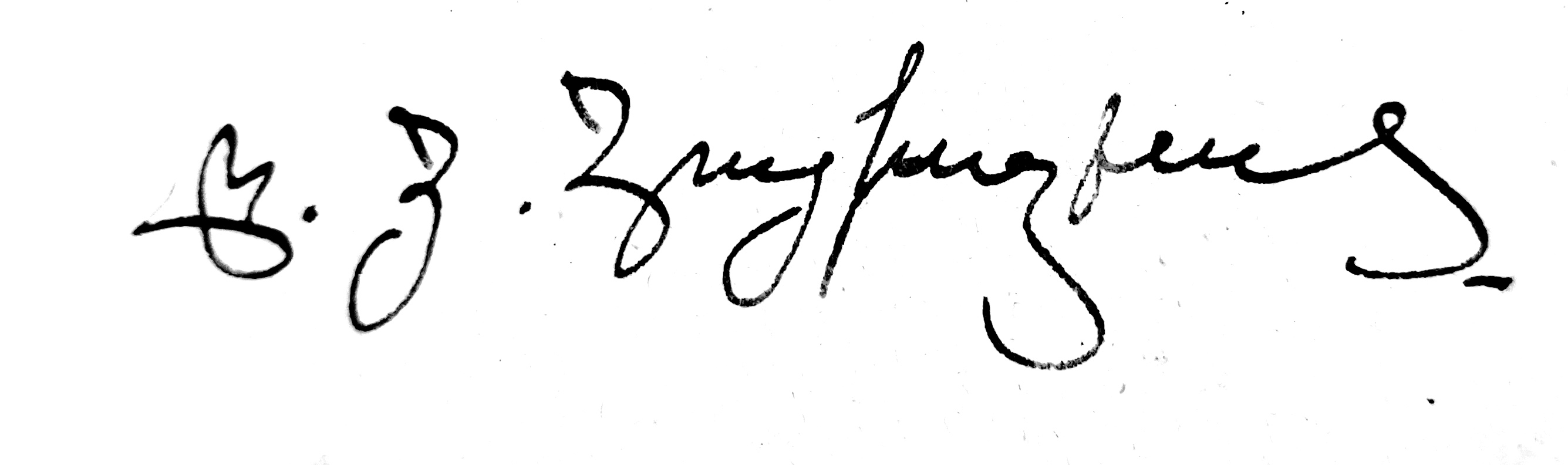

Armenag Haigazian (Armenian: Արմենակ Հայկազեան; 1870–1921), was an Armenian theologian, educator, scientist, linguist and musician.

== Life ==
He was born to Harutune Haigazian and Mary Tavonkian on September 22, 1870, in Hadjin, Cilicia, Ottoman Empire, now Turkey.

After completing his high school education in his native Hadjin in 1885, he moved to Antab and attended the Central Turkey College. During his junior and senior years, he was also a tutor in mathematics in the same institution. He earned the B.A. degree in 1889 at the age of nineteen.

He then entered the Marash Theological Seminary, where he graduated in 1892 and was licensed as a preacher of the Armenian Evangelical Church. He spent the next two years, 1892-1894, as an instructor of Mathematics and Physical Geography at St. Paul’s Institute in Tarsus.

In 1894, he moved to the United States of America to continue his education. After a year’s study at the University of Chicago in Semitics and Comparative Religion, with a focus on Assyrian archeology, he took postgraduate courses at the Hartford Theological Seminary, where he studied ancient Near Eastern languages. In 1896, the S.T.B. degree was conferred on him, in recognition of special advanced post-graduate work and high academic standing.

He earned a scholarship for doctoral study at Yale Divinity School. He received the Ph.D. degree from the Graduate School of Yale University in 1898 at the age of 28 after a two-year study in Semitic Languages and Biblical Literature. His thesis is entitled “The Text of Zephaniah”.

For a short period after graduation he studied music and harmony at the University of Toronto. In 1899, he went back to Chicago where he received ministerial ordination at the University Congregational Church. That same year he returned to Turkey and joined the faculty of the Apostolic Institute in Konia – also known as Jenanyan College (founded in 1892) as academic Dean. He was appointed Director of the Institute and later promoted to the presidency until his death. Through his efforts, the standard of the Institute was raised to that of a college and was later incorporated as the Apostolic College. In 1907, the Board of Trustees obtained incorporation for the Apostolic Institute under the laws of the State of New York, for educational and missionary work in the Levant. Based on missionary records, the Institute was managed entirely by Armenians.

During 1913-1914, he spent thirteen months in the US raising funds for new buildings for the Institute. While there, he participated in the Second World's Christian Citizenship Conference held in Portland, Oregon, June 29 to July 6, 1913. The conference, under the auspices of the National Reform Association, hosted speakers from each of the principal countries of the world. Men eminent in political life and in the legal profession, experts in reform work, ecclesiastics high in their respective churches, authors and educators contributed their share to the notable success of the meetings. Among them was Dr. Haigazian, a delegate from Turkey, who delivered the address, “Christian Forces in the Levant” during the July 3 schedule of the conference.

He returned to Konia in 1914, two days before WWI was officially declared. The Institute was closed in 1915, following the mass deportation of the Armenian population from Konia at the start of the Armenian Genocide. On May 9 of that year, Dr. Haigazian and his family were exiled from Konia and survived the atrocities committed by the Ottoman Empire, returning after several weeks. Upon the insistence of parents the Institute reopened in September 1919 with three hundred students enrolled.

Dr. Haigazian married Matilda Surpouhi Garabedian (1879-1968) on July 14, 1902. She was the daughter of prominent Armenian Evangelical pastor Rev. Dikran Lazarus Garabedian and Anna Kaprielian. They had six daughters, Mary (1903-2002), Daisy (1905-1987), Lily (1907-1970), Nelly (1909-2006), Pansy (1911-2010) and Arminé (1917-2002). On February 18, 1920, before the Kemalist government came into power in Turkey, Dr. Haigazian sent his wife and three daughters, Nelly, Pansy and Arminé to Constantinople. For the sake of their safety and education, his wife, along with five of their daughters, departed for New York and arrived on February 28, 1921.

Dr. Haigazian was arrested by Kemalist forces on May 22, 1921, during Sunday school and sent off to Harpoot on May 31. When he arrived in Harpoot on June 20, he was already near collapse. He had contracted typhus while being deported with a group of influential Armenians and Greeks. On June 23 he was sent to a quarantine camp. After the government delayed his admission to the hospital his health deteriorated dramatically. Eventually, they granted permission to admit him to the American Hospital in Mezereh on June 29. He died there on Thursday, July 7, 1921. The funeral took place in the Armenian Evangelical Church in Harpoot and he was buried in the church cemetery.

Years later, with a donation of 25,000 USD by his daughter Mary and son-in-law Avak (Steven) Mehagian and with the help of Stephen Philibosian, Haigazian College was founded on October 17, 1955, by the Union of the Armenian Evangelical Churches in the Near East (UAECNE) and the Armenian Missionary Association of America (AMAA) as an American-style liberal arts college to assist in the preparation of teachers and pastors. The College was named in his honor, in recognition of his contributions to Armenian education.

In 1992, Haigazian College was renamed Haigazian University College, and in 1996 received its present name, Haigazian University.
