= Lebanese space program =

The Lebanese space program was not initially an official government-sponsored effort. Rather, it revolved around the Lebanese Rocket Society which emerged from the Haigazian College Rocket Society, and was founded by Manoug Manougian in 1960. The original society gained fame in Lebanon after a series of successful launches of Cedar rockets and in 1962 President Fouad Chehab announced limited governmental funding for the renamed Lebanese Rocket Society which was also contacted by the Lebanese military to develop weapons.

== Lebanese Rocket Society ==
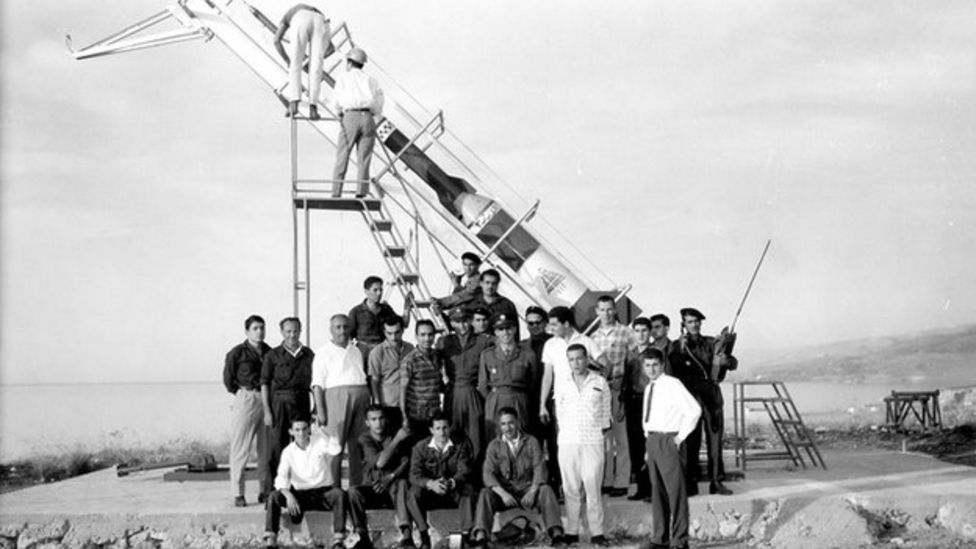
Cedar 3 rocket group photo

The Lebanese Rocket Society which was led by Manoug Manougian consisted of a small group of students from the Haigazian University. The society developed into the wider Lebanese space program and it produced the first rockets of the Arab World, which were capable of suborbital flight.

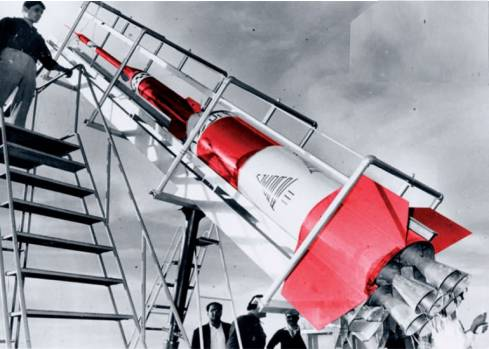
Cedar 3 rocket

In November 1960, a group of Haigazian College students got together under the guidance of Manoug Manougian (a Mathematics and Physics instructor) to form the Haigazian College Rocket Society (HCRS). With an initial budget of 750 Lebanese pounds donated by the late MP Emile Bustani, the members of the HCRS set out to prepare single and multistage solid fuel rockets. Aspects of the first single-stage rocket were assigned to each student. As a result of the lack of required equipment, the group was obliged to resort to flight testing without any fuel tests in the laboratories. After a number of failures, the project was finally successful. In April 1961, a single-stage solid propellant rocket was launched and reached an altitude of about one kilometer. With further improvements of the solid fuel system, a similar rocket called HCRS-3 was launched up to 2 km.

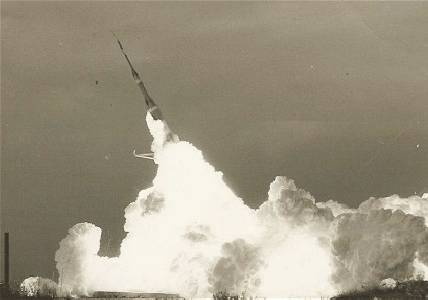
Cedar 3 rocket launch

The Lebanese President, Fouad Chehab, as a result of these experiments, granted financial assistance for the project (10 thousand LL for 1961 and 15 thousand LL for 1962).

During the academic year 1961–1962, the society worked on two-stage rockets with further improvements of the separation system, solid fuel system, and vehicle design. On May 25, 1962, HCRS-7 Cedar was Launched up to 11.5 km, and the Lebanese Army was responsible for the security of the launch. In the summer of 1962, two more rockets, Cedar llB and Cedar llC, were launched to a distance of 20 km. New members joined and a new group was formed in 1962, it was called the Lebanese Rocket Society (LRS).

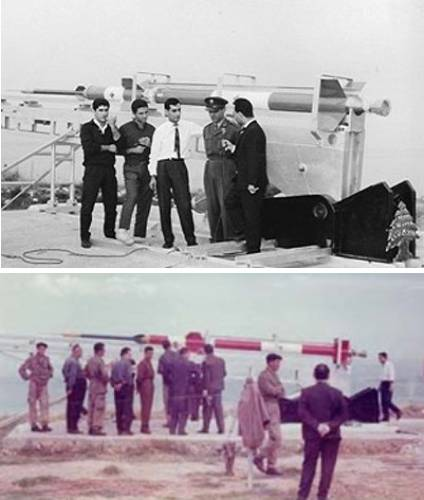
Cedar 4 rocket

The LRS was directed by a main committee of six members. Further tests were planned on design and construction of multistage rockets. On November 21, 1962, Cedar-3, a three stages solid propellant rocket prepared by the Haigazian group was launched. It had a length of 6.80 m and weight of 1250 kg.

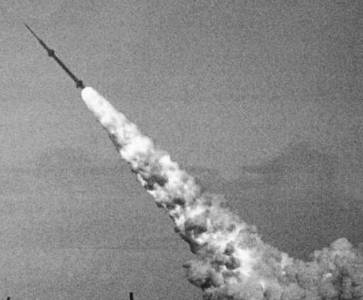
Cedar 4 rocket launch

After several other launchings, an accident occurred during the summer of 1964, which hospitalized 2 students who recovered. However, the launch was ended. In 1963, a Cedar IV rocket was launched and reached 90 miles (140 km) altitude, putting it close to the altitude of satellites in Low Earth Orbit. The rocket was later commemorated on a stamp.

The final launch by the Lebanon Rocket Society was in 1966.

== In popular culture ==
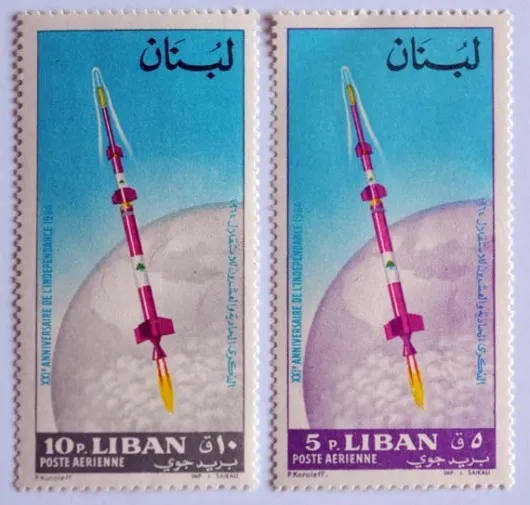
Lebanese Rocket Society postage stamps

A reproduction of a 1964 postage stamp was produced by the Lebanese postal service to commemorate the 21st anniversary of the Lebanese Independence. Depicted is one of Haigazian College's Cedar rockets. The society and wider Lebanese space programme is the focus of a 2012 film called The Lebanese Rocket Society. The 1963 Cedar 4 launch was also featured in A Sad and Beautiful World, as happening on the same day, the two protagonists of the film are born.
