= Manoug Manougian =

Armenian scientist (1935–2024)

- Born: Manoug Manougian; April 29, 1935; Jerusalem
- Died: March 27, 2024 (aged 88)
- Education: University of Texas (BA, MA, PhD)
- Known for: Lebanese Space Program
- Scientific career
- Fields: Mathematics; Rocketry
- Workplaces: University of South Florida; University of Texas; Haigazian University; St. George's School

Manoug Manougian (April 29, 1935 – March 27, 2024) was an Armenian scientist and academic who was considered to be the father of the Lebanese space program. Manougian was born on April 29, 1935, in Jerusalem. He died on March 27, 2024, in Tampa, Florida. He came to the United States in 1956. His parents are Nishan and Sirpouhi Manougian.

== Background ==
Manougian grew up in Jerusalem and was educated at St. George's School, Jerusalem. Manougian won a scholarship to the University of Texas, and he graduated in 1960 with a major in math. Right away, Haigazian College in Beirut was glad to offer him a job teaching both math and physics. The college also made him the faculty advisor for the science club. Manougian met his wife in Armenia c. 1955 when he became her tutor. They eloped shortly after to the United States. While his wife attended school in Ohio, Manougian attended the University of Texas (see above). After graduating, they moved to Beirut.

Manougian died on March 27, 2024, at the age of 88.

== Career ==
Manougian married in 1960 and went to Lebanon to become a teacher at Haigazian College.

=== Lebanese space program ===
Manougian founded the Haigazian College Rocket Society in November 1960. With a very limited budget, the society launched a series of rockets to increasing altitudes. It received funding from the Lebanese government and became the Lebanese Rocket Society. He and his students finally launched a suborbital rocket in 1963. The Cedar IV rocket, launched on Lebanese independence day, 21 November 1963 from Dbayeh north of Beirut, reached 90 miles (140 km) and was featured on Lebanese stamps.

=== Teaching ===
Manougian returned to the United States in 1966. Manougian completed a master's degree and doctorate at the University of Texas and continued his academic career in the Department of Mathematics at the University of South Florida. He was an adviser for the University's Society of Aeronautics and Rocketry which is currently trying to launch to rocket above the kármán line.

== Views and politics ==
As a member of the Armenian diaspora, he has been known to write editorials advocating awareness about the Armenian genocide. He is also a co-author and associate producer of a 4-hour documentary called The Genocide Factor: The Human Tragedy, that aired on PBS. In addition, he vehemently believes that rocketry and science should be pursued for solely peaceful means. Consequentially, he turned down multiple lucrative offers during his time in the Lebanese Rocket Society rather than let his work be used for military purposes.
