= Christophe Ruggia =

French film director and screenwriter

- Born: Rueil-Malmaison, France
- Occupation(s): Film director, screenwriter

Christophe Ruggia is a French film director, screenwriter. He was later convicted of molestation of a person under the age of consent who was under his authority, a young actress who he had cast in his film.

== Early life and education ==
Christophe Ruggia was born in Rueil-Malmaison, France.

He is a graduate of the Free Conservatory of French Cinema (Conservatoire libre du cinéma français), and laureate of the Fondation Marcel Bleustein-Blanchet in 1993.

== Career ==
In 1991, he conceived and produced a short film as part of a campaign against HIV/AIDS in the West Indies entitled, Sovè l'anmou. After L'Enfance Égarée (1993), a short film released in theaters in the program Four Urban Legends, he directed his first feature, Le Gone du Chaâba (1997), that was nominated at the César Awards.

He directed two other feature films, Les Diables (2002) and Dans la tourmente (2011).

== Other activities ==
Ruggia became known for his numerous activist commitments, and, according to Libération, he was several times co-president or vice-president between 2003 and June 2019 of the Société des réalisateurs de films (SRF, "Society of Film Directors"), as well as co-chair for the period 2014–2015.

== Activism ==
According to Libération in 2003, "he played a preponderant role in the coordination of the struggle" of recurring status entertainment workers.

In 2005, shortly before the conviction of director Jean-Claude Brisseau for sexual harassment, he was one of the signatories of a petition in support of the latter launched by Les Inrockuptibles. This petition denounces "the way in which certain media have reported on the trial against him".

In 2015, he launched with other filmmakers "The Call of Calais", which denounces a disengagement of the French government from the problem of the Calais Jungle, where thousands of migrants lived in miserable conditions.

He is the initiator of a support movement in France for the Ukrainian filmmaker Oleg Sentsov, an opponent of the annexation of Crimea, who was sentenced by Russia in 2015 to twenty years in prison for "acts of terrorism" and "arms trafficking" during a trial described as "Stalinist" by Amnesty International. When the Ukrainian filmmaker did not eat for three months, Ruggia launched in September 2018 with a collective of filmmakers a rotating hunger strike that he organized in front of the Russian embassy in Paris.

In the 2010s, he signed numerous forums and petitions, defending in particular undocumented workers, high school students engaged against police violence, Cédric Herrou—known for his help to migrants—and human rights in Syria.

== Sexual assault and sexual harassment investigation ==
On 3 November 2019, an article appeared in Mediapart in which actress Adèle Haenel accused Ruggia of "touching" and "sexual harassment" when she was between twelve and fifteen years old. Ruggia denied the accusations through his lawyers. In a right of reply published on Mediapart on 6 November 2019, he wrote: "I never had towards her, I repeat, the physical gestures and the behavior of sexual harassment of which she accuses me, but I made the mistake of playing Pygmalion with the misunderstandings and the obstacles that such a posture gives rise to, such as the hold on the actress he has directed and with which he dreamed of shooting again", and asked her for forgiveness, saying that his "adulation" for Haenel could have been "painful at times" for her: "At the time, I had not seen that my adulation and the hopes that I placed in her might have appeared to her, given her young age, as painful at times. If so, and if she can, I ask her to forgive me". At the same time he denounced a "media pillory" against him. The Société des réalisateurs de films (SRF) launched a delisting procedure against him.

Director Mona Achache, Ruggia's former romantic partner, testified for the investigation of Mediapart: "He had confided to me to have feelings of being in love for Adèle during the promotional tour of Les Diables." Achache said that he told her about a precise instance of physical contact with Haenel, in which Ruggia "got his hand on the belly of Adèle and then ran it up to her chest, under a T-shirt", while they were watching a film together and Adèle was lying with her head on his knees. According to the claim, Ruggia, seeing fear in Haenel's eyes, and getting scared himself, then withdrew his hand. Achache stated that she remained silent because it "seemed unfair to her to speak for Adèle Haenel", and that afterwards she left Ruggia. In an interview presented as a "counter-investigation" in Marianne, Ruggia said that the rupture between him and Achache took place after he found her with another man on a set, and that it was he who left the apartment where they lived together. He added that he had confided to his partner, at the beginning of their relationship, his "fascination" for Haenel, but, according to him, "the rest is only pure invention". According to this "counter-investigation", Achache remains friends with Laetitia Cangioni. Cangioni had to quit the filming of Les Diables in 2001 due to "burnout" and is presented by Marianne as being one of the four people who, during the investigation by Médiapart, claimed "to have felt something abnormal" in the relationship between Ruggia and Haenel during the shooting.

A preliminary investigation was opened by the Paris prosecutor's office for counts of sexual harassment and sexual assault "on a minor under 15 years by a person in authority", and was entrusted to the Central Directorate of the Judicial Police. Following this, Haenel filed a complaint against Ruggia, who was indicted on 16 January 2020 for "sexual assault on a 15-year-old minor by a person having authority over the victim".

In 2024, Ruggia went on trial for abusing Haenel. He faced a five-year prison sentence. On 3 February 2025, Ruggia was found guilty of sexual assault and sentenced to four years, of which two were suspended and two were to be spent under house arrest. He was also ordered to pay €15,000 in damages to Haenel and €20,000 for the treatment she underwent in several years of psychological therapy.

== Filmography ==
- 1992: Sové l'anmou, short film
- 1993: L'Enfance égarée, short film, later adapted into the feature film Les Diables
- 1997: Le Gone du Chaâba
- 2002: Les Diables
- 2011: Dans la tourmente
