= Ghassan Salhab =

Lebanese screenwriter and film director (born 1958)

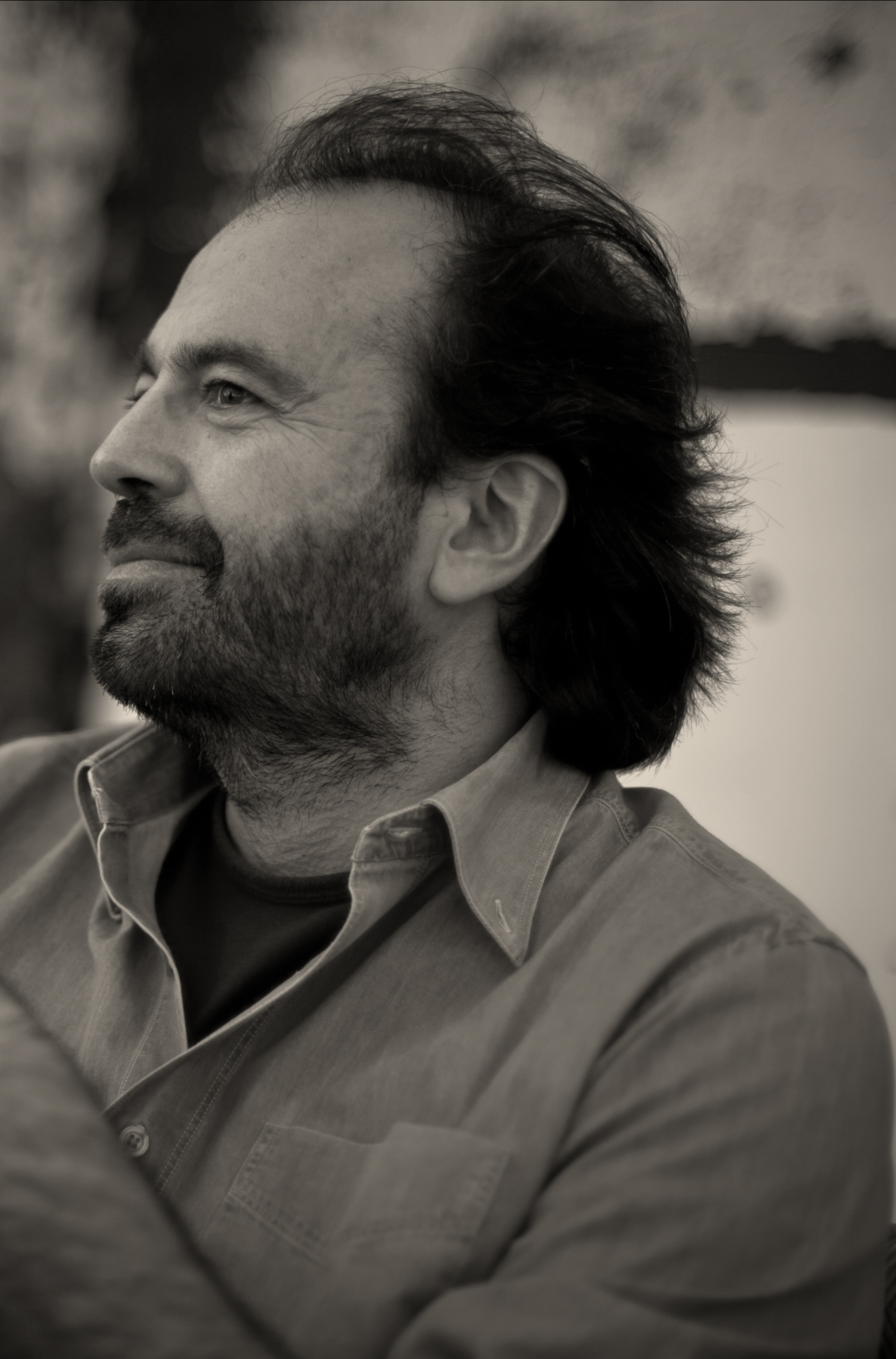
- Born: 4 May 1958 (age 67); Dakar, Senegal
- Occupation(s): Director, Writer
- Website: http://www.ghassansalhab.com/

Ghassan Salhab (Arabic; غسان سلهب, born 4 May 1958) is a Lebanese screenwriter and film director born in Dakar, Senegal. In addition to making his own films, he collaborates on various scenarios and teaches film in Lebanon.

== Career ==
He has directed six feature films; Beyrouth Fantôme, Terra Incognita, The Last Man, 1958, The Mountain and The Valley. His films have been selected in various international film festivals. He has finished the shooting of The River, in addition to numerous "essays" and different "video works" including "Posthumous," "Chinese Ink," "Son Image," and Le voyage Immobile," on which he collaborated with Lebanese documentary filmmaker Mohamed Soueid.

In 2016, he was a DAAD (Berlin) guest-resident. La Rochelle International Film Festival, JC Carthage and La Cinémathèque du Québec made a tribute to his work. He has also published different texts and articles in various magazines and a book, "fragments du Livre du naufrage".

== Filmography ==
=== Feature films ===
Year	Title	Notes
1998	Beyrouth fantôme	(2h)
2002	Terra incognita	(1h56)
2006	The Last Man	(1h41)
2009	1958	(1h06)
2011	The Mountain	(1h24)
2014	The Valley	(2h14)
2021	The River	(1h41)

=== Other works ===
Year	Title	Notes
1986	The Key	(15')
1991	The Other	(10')
1991	After Death	(21')
1994	Afrique fantôme	(21')
1999	Of Seduction	(32') co-directed with Nesrine Khodr
2000	Nobody's Rose	(10')
2000	Baalbeck	(56') in 3 parts, the 2 other by Akram Zaatari and Mohamed Soueid
2003	My dead body, my living body	(14')
2004	Lost Narcissus	(15')
2005	Brève rencontre avec Jean Luc Godard	(40')
2006	Dead Time	(7')
2007	(Posthumous)	(29')
2010	Le massacre des innocents	(triptych-video, 28')
2012	Everybody know this is nowhere	(diptych-video, 15')
2016	Son Image	(diptych-video, 22')
2017	Chinese Ink	(55')
2018	Le voyage immobile	(23') co-directed with Mohamed Soueid
2019	Une rose ouverte	(1h12)

== Publications ==
- Fragments du livre du naufrage, Amers Editions, 2011

== Exhibitions ==
=== Group exhibitions ===
- Beirut Lab: 1975(2020) Curated by Juli Carson and Yassmeen Tukan, University Art Gallery, University of California, Irvine, 2019
