= Julia Kassar =

Lebanese actress

Julia Kassar جوليا قصار
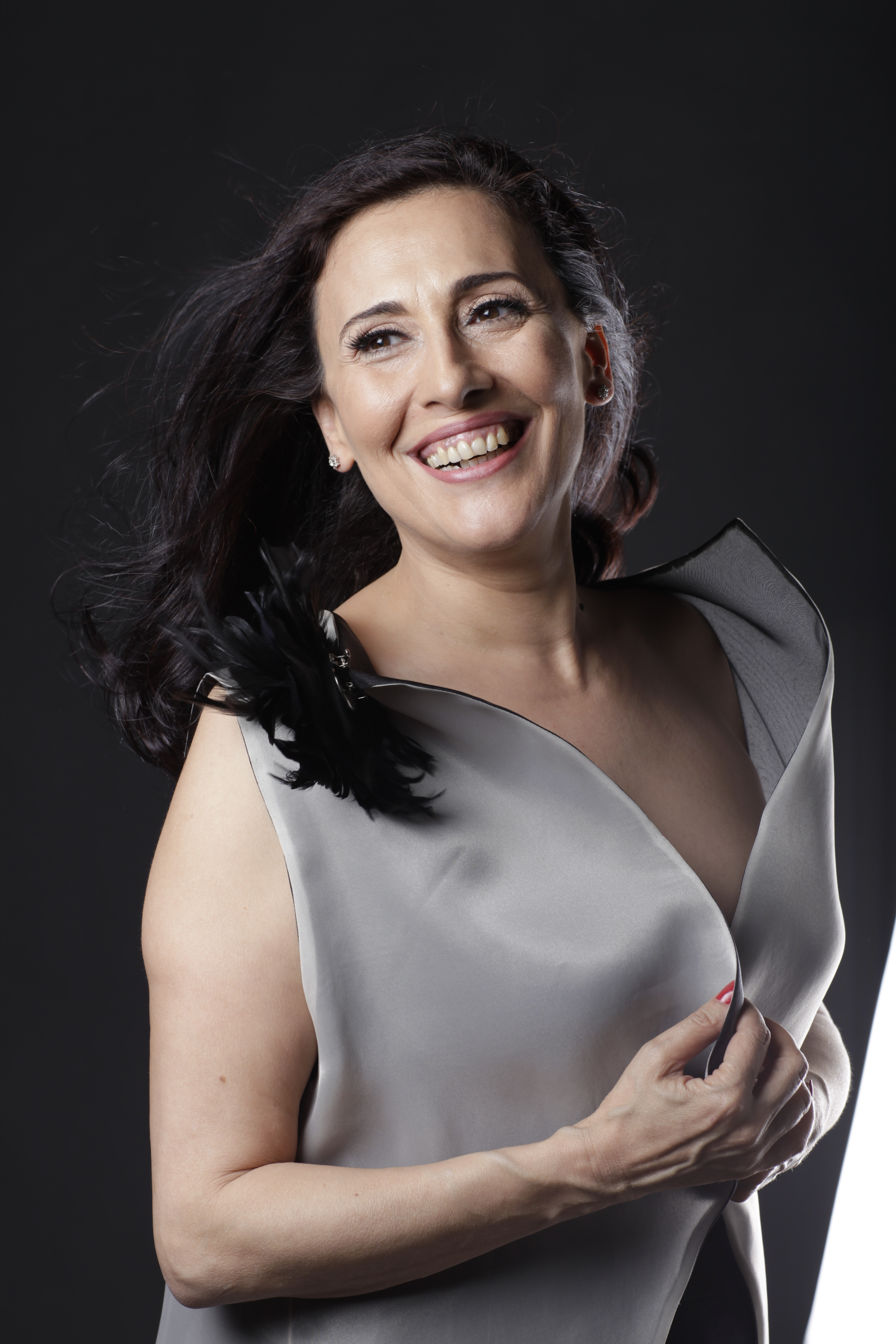
- Born: Julia Kassar; 1963 (age 62–63); Beirut, Lebanon
- Occupations: Actress, Academic
- Years active: 1985-present

Julia Kassar (Arabic: جوليا قصار) is a Lebanese actress, who is known for her roles in Lebanese cinema and theater. She has worked with many famous directors such as Nidal Al Achkar, Jawad al-Assadi, Jalal Khoury, and Roger Assaf. She received a Master diploma in Audiovisual arts in theater from the Holy Spirit University of Kaslik. She is also an academic teacher at the Lebanese University.

== Works ==
=== Films ===
Films
Year	Name	Role
1995	The storm	
1995	The old woman	
2003	The Kite	
2004	Fire waistband	
2005	A perfect day	Zina
2005	After shave	
2008	Melodrama Habibi	Randa Harfiush
2008	Sharbel	
2009	Jubran	Kamla
2011	Shati ya deni	
2015	Go Home	Colette
2016	Yala obalkon shabab	
2017	Nour	Muna
2017	The Ring	Therese
2017	The Insult	Colette Mansour
2018	The Mahraja	
2025	A Sad and Beautiful World	Oumaya

=== Series ===
Series
Year		
1992	My aunt home	Lamya
2003	Lost pictures	
2019	Who are you?	

=== Stages ===
Stages
Year	Name
1985	Dreams maker
1987	about tomorrow, what?
1988	Taret Naqshe
1988	Who want kill who?
1990	Khaleha ala hesab
1991	without playing boys
1992	from autumn flower pick
1992	thing like Alaska
1993	Nahawand
1993	Ayoub diaries
1994	Faltana
1995	The two servants
1996	Signs and conversions rituals
1997	Hansel and Gretel
1998	impate and distance
1999	beek neek
2000	Once
2003	No! No! Exit
2004	Migrant
2005	Jubran and The Prophet
2010	Vetrin
2012	killing Anne and her sisters
2012	The Dictator

== Awards ==
Awards
Year	Award	Work	Reference
2004	Best supporting actress Carthage Film Festival	Fire waistband	
2010	Murex d'Or Distinguished award	Shrbel	
2011	Honorary award from Lebanon cinema association	Shati ya deni	
2011	Arabi award as best actress from Rebat international festival	Shati ya deni	
