= Walid Sadek =

Lebanese artist and writer (born 1966)

Walid Sadek (born in Beirut, Lebanon, 1966) is a Lebanese artist and writer. He is a professor at the Department of Fine Arts and Art History of the American University of Beirut, and held its chairmanship from 2017 to date.

== Life and work ==
Walid Sadek uses poetic and metaphoric language to evoke on post war Lebanon. In 1999, he produced Bigger than Picasso a tiny and unexpected book using word and image to criticize a political situation in the country.

Sadek, who has regularly collaborated with Beirut-based artist centre Ashkal Alwan, has participated in numerous exhibitions and events worldwide. In 2010, he presented his first solo exhibition at the Beirut Art Center. He was guest editor of the academic journal Third Text on issue 117, July 2012, titled "Not, Not Arab".

== Publications ==
- Fi annani akbar min Picasso (bigger than Picasso), (Beirut, Ayloul Festival, 1999)
- Al-Kasal [Indolence] with Bilal Khbeiz (Beirut: The 3rd World, 1999)
- The Ruin to Come, Essays from a protracted war (Motto Books, Taipei Biennale, 2016)

Collected essays, written in Beirut over a period of 10 years between 2006 and 2016, look at the conditions of living under a temporality theorized as the "protracted now" of a civil war, one structurally capable of perpetuating the conditions of its own dominance.

- How to speak dead, (Kayfa ta, 2025)

== Selected exhibitions ==
=== Solo exhibitions ===
- Place at Last Walid Sadek, Beirut Art Center, 2010
- Walid Sadek '"On the labour of missing", Galerie Tanit, Beirut, 2012

=== Group exhibitions ===
- Ashkal Alwan – Hamra Street Project, Beirut, 2000
- Contemporary Arab Representations, Beirut/Lebanon, Witte de With, Rotterdam, 2002
- Home Works III – A Forum of Cultural Practices, Beirut, 2005
- Out of Beirut, Modern Art Oxford, Oxford, 2006
- Foreword, Pavilion of Lebanon, 52nd Venice Biennale, 2007
- Home Works IV, Galerie Sfeir Semler, Beirut, 2008
- Lebanon Now, Darat al Funun, Amman, 2008
- The 4th Auckland Triennial, Auckland, 2010
- Sharjah Biennial 10: Plot for a Biennial, Sharjah, 2011
- Seeing is Believing, KW Berlin, 2011
- Home Works 6 Exhibition, Artheum, Beirut, 2013
- Unnamed exhibition with Gheith Al-Amine, Aissa Deebi, Bassam Kahwagi, Jacko Restikian and Shawki Youssef, Galerie Tanit, Beirut, 2014
