= Memory Box =

2021 drama film

- Film poster
- Directed by: Joana Hadjithomas; Khalil Joreige
- Screenplay by: Joana Hadjithomas; Khalil Joreige
- Produced by: Abbout Productions
- Starring: Rim Turki; Manal Issa; Paloma Vauthier
- Release date: March 2021 (Berlinale)
- Countries: France; Lebanon; Canada; Qatar
- Languages: Lebanese Arabic, French

Memory Box is a 2021 drama film written and directed by Joana Hadjithomas and Khalil Joreige. The film stars Rim Turki, Manal Issa and Paloma Vauthier.

The film had its worldwide premiere at the 71st Berlin International Film Festival in March 2021. Memory Box is the first Lebanese film to be nominated, among 15 films, for the Berlinale Competition in four decades.

== Plot ==
Maia, a single mother, lives in Montreal with her teenage daughter, Alex. On Christmas Eve, they receive an unexpected delivery: notebooks, tapes, and photos Maia sent to her best friend from 1980s Beirut. Maia refuses to open the box or confront its memories, but Alex secretly begins diving into it. Between fantasy and reality, Alex enters the world of her mother's tumultuous, passionate adolescence during the Lebanese civil war, unlocking mysteries of a hidden past.

== Cast ==
- Rim Turki as Maia Sanders adult
- Manal Issa as Maia Sanders young
- Paloma Vauthier as Alex Sanders
- Michelle Bado as Michelle
- Rita Bado
- Rabih Mroué as Raja
- Patrick Chemali as Halim

== Technique ==
Well known for their experimental techniques, the filmmakers duo used Hadjithomas's own journal and tapes between 1982 and 1988 and Joreige's photographs of the Lebanese civil war to mix imagination and reality. "Footage is degraded and scratched. Images become short narratives reminiscent of the photo stories in teen magazines of the period. Other sequences have the stylised look of an A-Ha pop video." writes Allan Hunter for ScreenDaily.

== Memory ==
Re-writing contemporary history and questioning the role of memory in the fabrication of images is a recurrent theme in Hadjithomas and Joreige's artistic and cinematographic work. The pair has shown particular interests in the traces of the invisible and the absent, histories kept secret and the disappearances during the Lebanese Civil War which is present in films like A Perfect Day, in which Malek and his mother decide to declare his father officially dead after his disappearance for 15 years during the civil war, and Je Veux Voir, where Catherine Deneuve, representing herself, faces with the devastation of South Lebanon after military conflicts in 2006. Deborah Young from The Hollywood Reporter describes Memory Box as "a recognizable extension of these cerebral films" with a story much easier to connect to, and with "the engaging cast of strong actresses that widens its appeal."

== Release ==
On February 11, 2021, Berlinale announced that the film would have its worldwide premiere at the 71st Berlin International Film Festival in the Berlinale Competition section, in March 2021.

== Reception ==
‘Memory Box’ holds a rating of 90% on Rotten Tomatoes. Following the world premiere at the 71st Berlinale, the film was reviewed by major critics and writers like Cirina Catania from US Times who described the film as "Unexpected, insightful, tough, triste, joyful and full of love, this film is a must-see." Jay Weissberg from Variety wrote that "Hadjithomas and Joreige’s creative treatment of the image, including meaningful juxtaposition of different gauges and textures, has never felt so accessible to audiences unused to avant-garde practices, and while this is a deeply personal film, it will have overpowering resonance with multitudes of viewers." "While on the outside it seems like Memory Box tells a familiar story of a ghost from the past, the film is actually so much more complex than that. It’s introspective, affecting, and visually inventive depiction of how memory, good or bad, plays a huge part in shaping us in the present. Hadjithomas and Joreige have done it again", says Reyzando Navara from Film Inquiry.

== Awards ==
- Nominated for the Golden Bear top prize at the 71st Berlinale.

== See also ==
- List of submissions to the 95th Academy Awards for Best International Feature Film
- List of Lebanese submissions for the Academy Award for Best International Feature Film
