= Haigazian University =

University in Beirut, Lebanon

- جامعة هايكازيان
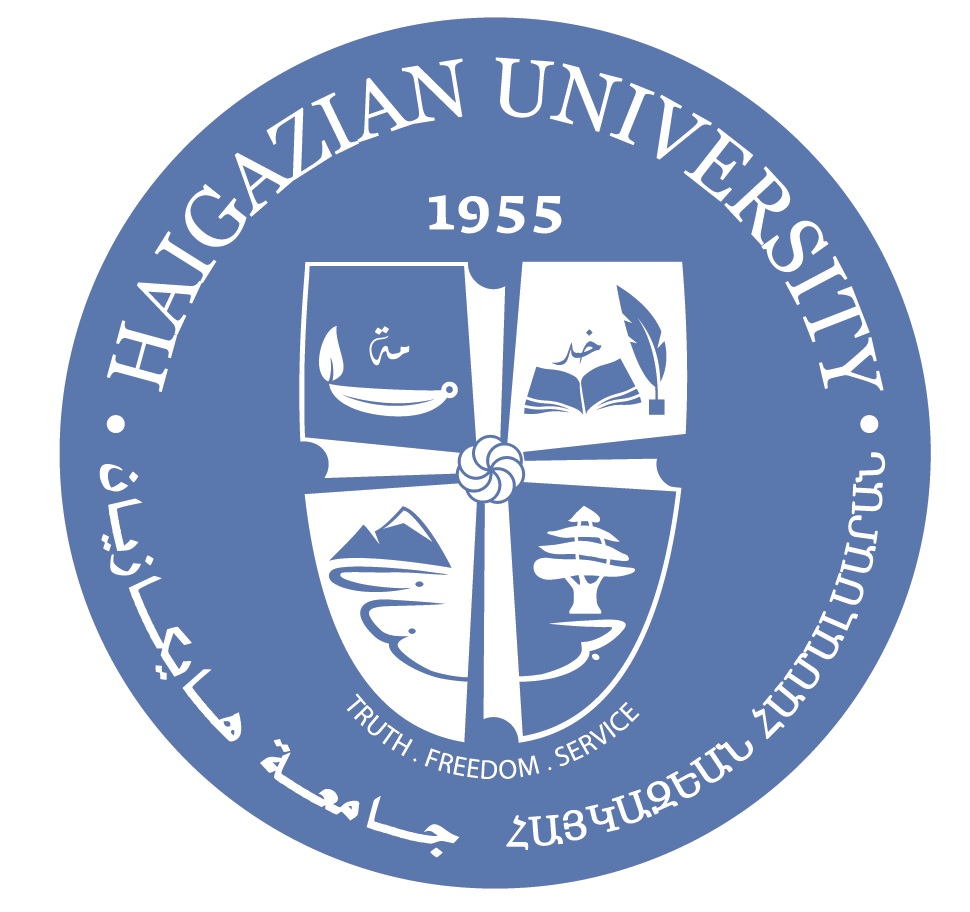
- Haigazian University logo
- Motto: Truth Freedom Service.
- Type: Private
- Established: 1955
- President: Rev. Paul Haidostian, Ph.D.
- Administrative staff: –
- Location: Beirut, Lebanon
- Campus: Urban
- Website: www.haigazian.edu.lb

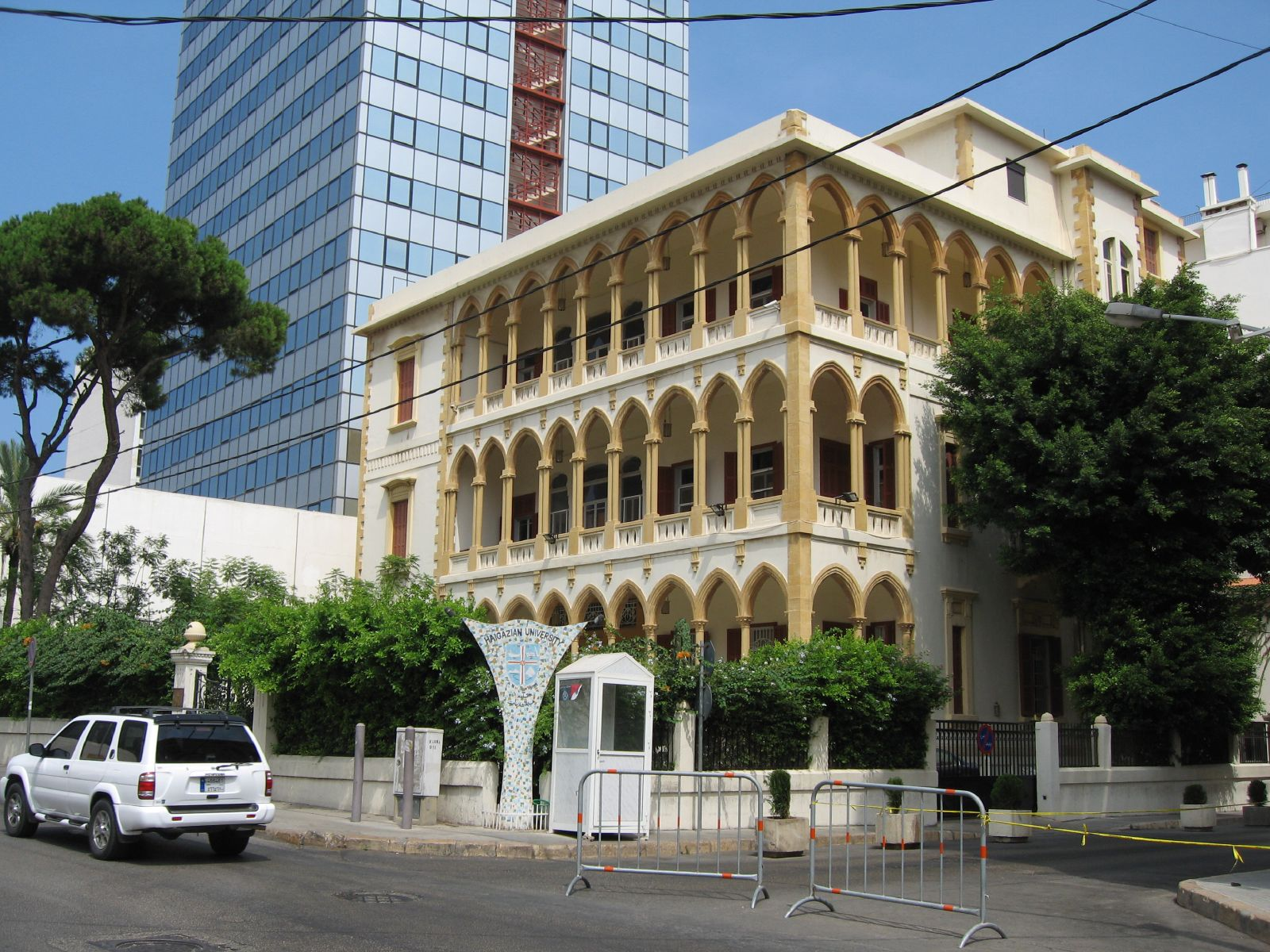
Part of the Haigazian University campus

Haigazian University (Arabic: جامعة هايكازيان; Armenian: Հայկազեան Համալսարան, pronounced Haygazyan Hamalsaran) is a higher education institution founded in 1955 in Beirut, Lebanon as Haigazian College. For a brief period starting 1992, the name was changed to Haigazian University College before the institution adopted the present name in 1996. It offers programs leading to Bachelor's degrees in the Arts and Sciences as well as Business Administration and Economics, in addition to Master's degrees in the Arts, Sciences and Business Administration. English is the main language of instruction, although some courses are offered in Armenian and Arabic. All degrees from Haigazian are recognized by the Lebanese government and the Association of International Colleges and Universities. It is supported by the Armenian Evangelical community, and was established primarily to meet the needs of the large Lebanese-Armenian population. However, the university is open to all students, regardless of race, nationality, or creed, and has professors and student body from all sections of Lebanese society.

== History ==
=== Beginnings ===
Haigazian University is named in honor of Dr. Armenag Haigazian (Armenian: Արմենակ Հայկազյան), former headmaster of the Jenanian Apostolic Institute of Konya, Turkey. Dr. Haigazian was a highly respected educator who received his Ph.D. from Yale University and returned to Turkey to serve his Armenian compatriots. When the genocide of the Armenians began, Dr. Haigazian had the opportunity to escape to the United States, but he chose to stay and continue his ministry. Later, he, along with many Armenian intellectuals, was rounded up to be driven into the Syrian desert. Dr. Haigazian died on the way in the prison of Kharpert in 1921 (New York Times article). Concurrently, eight Armenian colleges were also destroyed in Turkey. Although these aspects of education and service were brought to an end, the dream continued in the minds of Dr. Haigazian's descendants and others. The Mehagian family (Mary Mehagian and Florence Mehagian-Guertmenian) of Phoenix, Arizona, close relatives of Dr. Haigazian, donated capital through the AMAA and worked hand in hand with Stephen Philibosian to get Haigazian College started. The university was founded on October 17, 1955, by the Union of Armenian Evangelical Churches in the Near East (UAECNE) and the Armenian Missionary Association of America (AMAA) as a liberal arts college to assist in the preparation of teachers and pastors.

Prior to this date, the Armenian Evangelical community of Beirut, to complement its high schools and the Teacher Training needs, had established two post-secondary educational programs: the Teacher's Training Institute, which was housed in the library of the Central High School and operated from 1948 to 1951, and the Armenian Evangelical College, which held a Freshman Arts and Sciences program under the sponsorship of the First Armenian Evangelical Church of Beirut. These two entities merged in 1951 forming a Freshman Arts and Sciences plus a Sophomore Arts program, and they continued to serve the Armenian Community until 1955, when Haigazian College was established.

=== Haigazian College (1955-1992) ===
Haigazian College was originally designed to function as a junior college offering two years of university-level education. However, a demand for upper-division classes encouraged the institution to develop four year programs.

The university was founded on October 17, 1955, by the Union of the Armenian Evangelical Churches in the Near East (UAECNE) and the Armenian Missionary Association of America (AMAA) as a liberal arts college to assist in the preparation of teachers and pastors. When the university opened in 1955, there were 43 students enrolled. Student enrollment reached 740 before the start of the civil disturbances in Lebanon in 1975.

On October 17, 1955, Haigazian University was established in Beirut, Lebanon by the joint endeavors of the Armenian Missionary Association of America (AMAA) and the Union of the Armenian Evangelical Churches in the Near East (UAECNE).

The university was first located in the Webb Building, a ten-room house converted for college use. Later, a seven-story building was added. This building was called the Mehagian Academic Centre in honor of Mr. and Mrs. A. S. Mehagian, whose financial support made its construction possible. A grant from Mr. Stephen P. Mugar enabled the university to acquire a beautiful historic structure, subsequently named the Mugar Building, to honor the donor's parents.

Prior to this date, the Armenian Evangelical community of Beirut, to complement its high schools, had established two post-secondary educational entities: the Teacher's Training Institute, which was housed in the library of the Central High School and operated from 1948 to 1951, and the Armenian Evangelical College, which held a Freshman Arts and Sciences program under the sponsorship of the First Armenian Evangelical Church of Beirut. These two entities merged in 1951 forming a Freshman Arts and Sciences plus a Sophomore Arts program, and they continued to serve the Armenian Community until 1955, when Haigazian College was established. Haigazian College was originally designed to function as a junior college offering two years of university-level education. However, a demand for upper-division classes encouraged the institution to develop four-year programs.

Haigazian operated under its original name of "College" until 1991.

=== Haigazian University College (1992-1996) ===
In keeping with Near Eastern nomenclature, the name was changed to Haigazian University College in 1992.

=== Haigazian University (1996-present) ===
On December 28, 1996, the Ministry of Culture and Higher Education of Lebanon issued decree number 9657, which authorized the institution to change its name to Haigazian University. Dr. John Markarian, the first president of the university, served until June 1966. During the years 1967 to 1971, Dr. Gilbert Bilezikian held this position; then Dr. Markarian returned to the post until his retirement in June 1982. Subsequently, the presidency was held by Dr. Verne H. Fletcher until February 1985. Miss Wilma Cholakian, the administrative dean, was then responsible for the operation of the university until August 30, 1995. Dr. John Khanjian served as president from September 1, 1995, until August 1, 2002. On September 1, 2002, Rev. Dr. Paul Haidostian became president. When the university opened in 1955, there were 43 students enrolled. Student enrollment reached 650 before the start of the civil disturbances in Lebanon in 1975. The present enrollment is approximately 750 with a faculty and staff of 150. So far, the university has granted the Bachelor of Arts, Bachelor of Business Administration, Bachelor of Science and Master of Arts, Master of Business Administration degrees in various fields to more than 2,700 students.

Empowered by its newly acquired authorization from the Ministry of Culture and Higher Education to offer graduate programs, since 1995, the institution has started four Masters programs: Educational Administration and Supervision, General Psychology, Clinical Psychology, and Masters in Business Administration.

== Buildings ==
The university was first located in the Webb Building the residence of American Missionary Elizabeth Webb, a ten-room house converted for college use. Later, a seven-story building was added. This building was called the Mehagian Academic Center in honor of Mr. and Mrs. A. S. Mehagian, whose financial support made its construction possible. A grant from Mr. Stephen P. Mugar of Boston, MA enabled the university to acquire a beautiful historic structure, a sample of the Lebanese architectural heritage, subsequently named the Mugar Building, to honor the donor's parents.

In 1987, due to the Lebanese war, the university moved to the Christian Medical Center in the Ashrafieh district, and classes continued as usual. On March 27, 1996, the Board of Managers decided that the university should return to its original campus on Rue Mexique, Kantari. On February 16, 1997, the renovation of the former campus began. On October 6, 1997, classes resumed in the renovated and revitalized Kantari campus to the delight of students and the community at large.

Early in July 2001, began the construction of a fourth building on the Mugar property which has a media center, a board room, and faculty offices. This new facility became operational in October 2001. Another addition, a new heritage building on May Ziadeh street will be ready for use early 2010.

== Background ==
Haigazian University is named in honor of Dr. Armenag Haigazian, former headmaster of the Jenanian Apostolic Institute of Konya, Turkey. Dr. Haigazian was an educator who received his Ph.D. from Yale University and returned to Turkey to serve his Armenian compatriots. After the law for forced exile of the Armenians passed in the Ottoman Parliament, Dr. Haigazian had the opportunity to escape to the United States, but he chose to stay and continue his ministry.

Later, he, along with the Armenian intellectuals, was rounded up to be driven to the Syrian desert. Dr. Haigazian died on the way in the prison of Kharpert in 1921. Concurrently, eight Armenian colleges were destroyed in Turkey. Although these realities of education and service were brought to an end, the dream continued in the minds of Dr. Haigazian's descendants and others. The Mehagian family (Mary Mehagian and Florence Mehagian-Guertmenian) of Phoenix, Arizona, relatives of Dr. Haigazian, donated capital through the Armenian Missionary Association of America (AMAA) and worked hand in hand with Stephen Philibosian to get Haigazian College started.

Dr. John Markarian, the first president of the university, served until June 1966. From 1966 to 1968, Dr. Joseph Spradley, chair of the division of sciences, served as acting president while on a 3-year leave of absence from Wheaton College in Illinois. During the years 1968 to 1971, Dr. Gilbert Bilezikian, also from Wheaton College, held the presidency; then Dr. Markarian returned to the post until his retirement in June 1982. Subsequently, the presidency was held by Dr. Verne H. Fletcher until February 1985. Miss Wilma Cholakian, the administrative dean, was then responsible for the operation of the university until August 30, 1995. Dr. John Khanjian served as president from September 1, 1995, until August 1, 2002. On September 1, 2002, Rev. Dr. Paul Haidostian became president.

In 1987, due to the war, the university moved to the Christian Medical Center in the Achrafieh district of Beirut, and classes continued as usual. On March 27, 1996, the Board of Managers decided that the university should return to its original campus on Rue Mexique, Kantari. On February 16, 1997, the renovation of the former campus began. On October 6, 1997, classes resumed in the renovated and revitalized Kantari campus.

In July 2001, construction began on a fourth building on the Mugar property which has a media center, a board room, and faculty offices. This new facility became operational in October 2001. In 2003, Haigazian University started to use the whole seven floors of the south wing of the adjacent Armenian Evangelical College (AEC), according to a non-rent agreement between the administration and the AEC trustees.

Empowered by its newly acquired authorization from the Ministry of Culture and Higher Education to offer graduate programs, since 1995, the institution has started four M.A. programs: Educational Administration and Supervision, General Psychology, Clinical Psychology, and Masters in Business Administration.

== Faculties ==
- Faculty of Humanities, which includes:
  - Arabic language and literature
  - English language and literature
  - History
  - Music and Art
  - Armenian language and culture
  - Religion: Christian Education
- Faculty of Applied Sciences, which includes:
  - Biology
  - Chemistry
  - Computer Science
  - Mathematics
  - Physics
  - Medical Laboratory Sciences
- Faculty of Social Sciences, which includes:
  - Education: Early childhood education
  - Elementary/Intermediate education
  - Normal Diploma
  - Political Science
  - Psychology
  - Sociology
  - Social Work
- Faculty of Business Administration:
  - Management
  - Finance
  - Accounting
  - Economics
  - Hospitality Management
  - Management Information Systems
  - Advertising and Communication

== Degrees granted ==
- Bachelor of Arts: 94 – 108 credits (3 years)
- Master of Arts: 33 – 39 credits (2 years)
- Bachelor of Science: 94 – 110 credits (3 years)
- Master of Science: 33 – 39 credits (2 years)

== Publications ==
Haigazian University has the following publications:

- Haigazian Herald (student newsletter)
- HUBS Business Review (business publication)
- Focus (yearbook)
- INSPIRIT (newsletter of alumni and friends of Haigazian University)
- Haigazian Armenological Review

== Rocketry ==
The Lebanese Rocket Society was led by Manoug Manougian and consisted of a small group of students from the Haigazian University. The society developed into the wider Lebanese space program and it produced the first rockets of the Arab World, which were capable of suborbital flight.

In November 1960, a group of Haigazian College students got together under the guidance of Manoug Manougian (a Math and Physics instructor) to form the Haigazian College Rocket Society (HCRS).

Aspects of the first single-stage rocket were assigned to each student. As a result of the lack of required equipment, the group was obliged to resort to flight testing without any fuel tests in the laboratories. After a number of failures, the project was crowned with success.

In April 1961, a single-stage solid propellant rocket was Launched and reached an altitude of about one kilometer. With further improvements of the solid fuel system, a similar rocket called HCRS-3 was Launched all the way up to 2 000 m.

The Lebanese President, Fouad Chehab, as a result of these experiments, met with the members of HCRS and granted financial assistance for the project (10 thousand LL for 1961 and 15 thousand LL for 1962).

During the academic year 1961–1962, the society worked on two-stage rockets with further improvements of the separation system, solid fuel system, and vehicle design. On May 25, 1962, HCRS-7 Cedar was Launched up to 11,500 m, and the Lebanese Army was responsible for the security of the launch. In the summer of 1962, two more rockets, Cedar ll B and Cedar ll c, Were Launched to a distance of 20 km.

Due to the successes of the HCRS new members joined and a new group was formed in 1962, it was called the Lebanese Rocket Society (LRS).

The LRS was directed by a main committee of six members: Mr. M. Manougian of Haigazian College (Director), Dr. P. Mourad of AUB (advisor), Mr. Karamanougian of Haigazian college, Mr.J. Sfeir (Electronic engineer), Mr, E. Kai (Engineer geodesist), and an officer expert in ballistics (granted by the Army). Further tests were planned on design and construction of multistage rockets. Mr. Hart supervised the works of the HCRS while Mr. Manougian was in the U.S.A. Members of the HCRS at the college were: Hampartzum Karaguezian, Hrair Aintablian, Hrair Sahagian, Jirair Zenian, and Jean Jack Guvlekjian.

On November 21, 1962, Cedar-3, a three-stage solid propellant rocket prepared by the Haigazian group was launched. It had a length of 6.80 m and weight of 1250 kg.

After several other launchings, an accident occurred during the summer of 1964, which hospitalized two students, who later recovered. However, the launchings were ended then, and no "big bang" has taken place since. The outcome of these experiments was not a Haigazian student walking on the Moon, but more students walking into Haigazian's admissions office. One has to realize that nowadays, after the Lebanese civil wars, the idea of a rocket is not very pleasing, but in the 1960s when both the U.S.and the U.S.S.R. were trying to reach the Moon, Haigazian College was also on track.

A reproduction of a 1964 postage stamp produced by the Lebanese postal service to commemorate the 21st anniversary of Lebanese Independence. Depicted is one of Haigazian College's Cedar rockets.

== See also ==
- Haigazian Armenological Review
- Armenag Haigazian
- Hagop Barsoumian
