= Joana Hadjithomas and Khalil Joreige =

Lebanon filmmaking couple

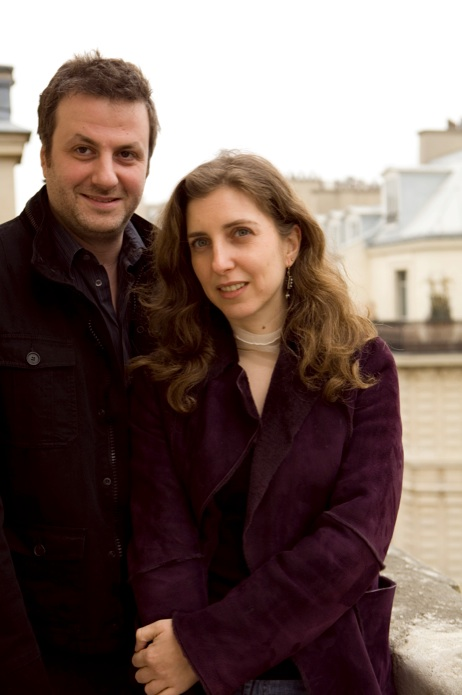
- Born: 1969 (age 56–57); Beirut
- Awards: 2017 Marcel Duchamp Prize
- Website: hadjithomasjoreige.com

Joana Hadjithomas and Khalil Joreige are Lebanese filmmakers and artists. Their work includes feature and documentary films, video and photographic installations, sculpture, performance lectures and texts.

== Personal life ==
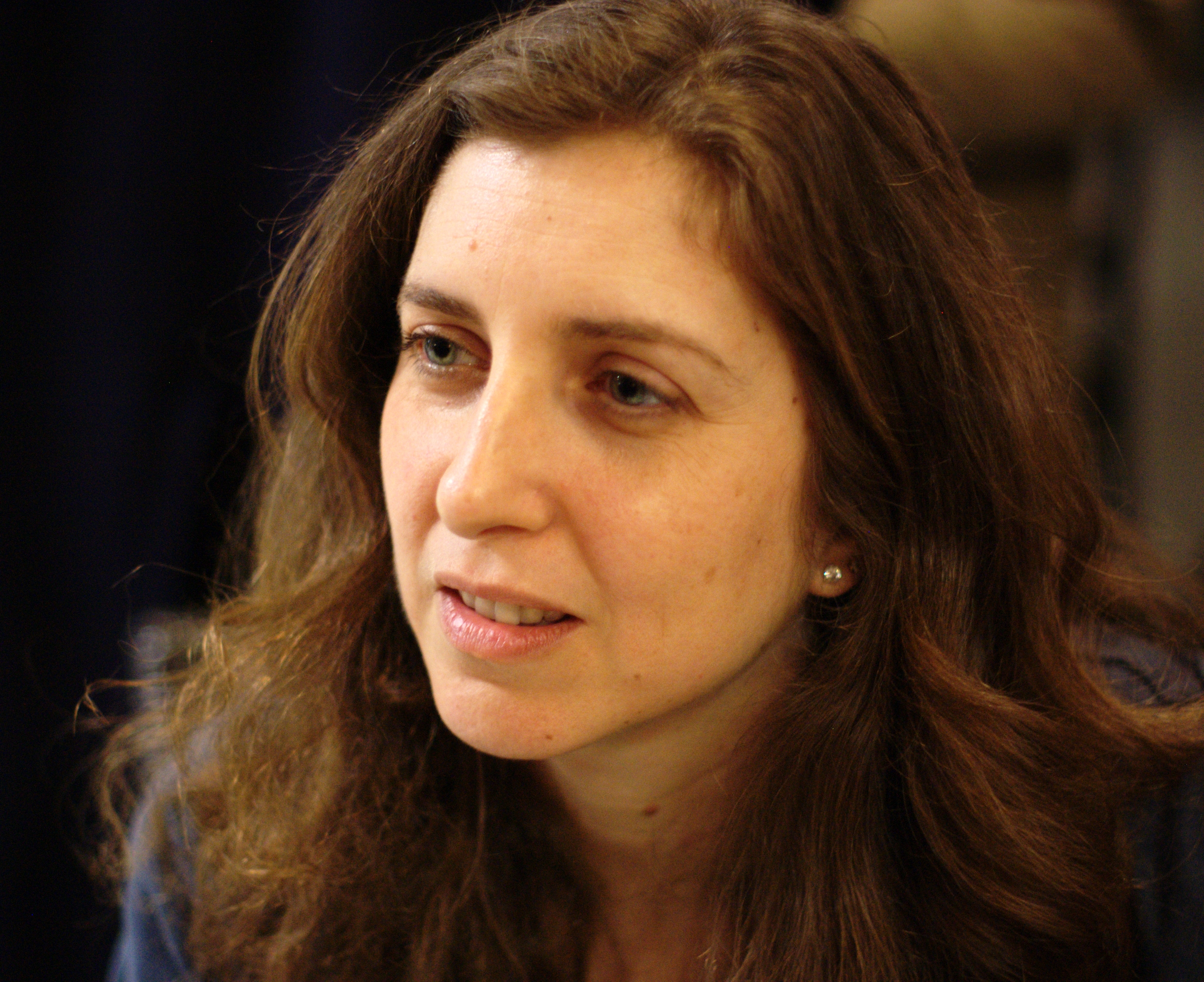
Hadjithomas in 2009

Joana Hadjithomas (born 10 August 1969, Arabic: جوانا حاجي توما, Greek: Ιωάννα Χατζηθωμά) and Khalil Joreige (Arabic: خليل جريج) were born in Beirut in 1969 to refugee families, one of them Greek, Syrian and Lebanese, the other Palestinian and Lebanese. They spent their childhood in Beirut during the Lebanese Civil War. They both studied literature at the Paris Nanterre University and film in New York. They are married.

They have collaborated since the early 1990s on videos, films, photographs, and installations. They are known for their long-term research based on personal or political documents and their particular interest in the traces of the invisible and the absent, a forgotten space project from the 1960s, the strange consequences of Internet scams or the geological and archaeological undergrounds of cities. They occasionally use explicit life events as subjects for their work, such as the kidnapping and disappearance of Joreige's uncle, Alfred Junior Kettaneh, or Hadjithomas's paternal origins in the documentary ISMYRNA, with the poet and painter Etel Adnan.

== Work ==
Hadjithomas and Joreige interweave formal, conceptual and thematic links through photographs, video installations and films. Their work in film often influences and leads to projects in the plastic arts, and vice versa. They are known to work over several years on a single project, and often revisit earlier works in retrospection.

The importance of research in their work is such that they prefer to describe themselves not as artists but "chercheurs" – literally 'those that are looking for something' but also 'researchers'. Inspired by personal archives and found documents, they work and research in collaboration with other writers, philosophers, historians, archaeologists and illustrators, and have spoken about the importance of this aspect: 'We believe in encounter more than in influence and, beyond that, we cultivate admiration: so many photos, film sequences, conversations, meetings and exchanges have nurtured and enabled us, at some time, to admire someone or something.'

Hadjithomas and Joreige are also university lecturers in Lebanon and Europe and the authors of numerous publications and performances. Joana Hadjithomas is a former member of the Curriculum Committee of the Ashkal Alwan Academy, Home Work Space. Both artists are co-founders of Abbout Productions, with Georges Schoucair and executive members of the board of Metropolis Art Cinema and the Cinemathèque in Beirut.

== Film ==
As well as artists, Hadjithomas and Joreige are film directors. Their filmography includes documentaries such as Khiam 2000 – 2007 (2008), The Lebanese Rocket Society : The Strange Tale of the Lebanese Space Race (2013), which received multiple awards such as Best Documentary Award in Doha Tribeca Festival, Qatar, and ISMYRNA (2016) as well as feature films including Around the Pink House, (1999), A Perfect Day, (2005), premiered at Locarno International Film Festival and awarded, among many other prizes, the Fipresci Press Prize, Je Veux Voir (I Want to See) (2008), starring Catherine Deneuve and Rabih Mroué, which premiered in the official selection of Cannes Film Festival in 2008, and was awarded Best Singular Film by the French Critics Guild and their latest feature film Memory Box, released in 2021, which is based on Hadjithomas' notebooks and tapes made in Beirut as a teenager during the Lebanese civil war in the 1980s. and selected at the Berlinale and released in more than 40 countries.

In their fiction films, they are known to borrow tropes from documentary filmmaking, and vice versa, blurring the lines between the real and the illusory.

Several retrospectives of their films have been presented in renowned institutions such as Tate Modern (London), Cinematek (Brussels), Flaherty Seminar (New York), Institut Français and Mori Art Museum (Tokyo), International Film Festival of Gijon (Spain), Harvard Film Archive (Cambridge), Locarno International Film Festival (Switzerland) and MoMA (New York).

== Art ==
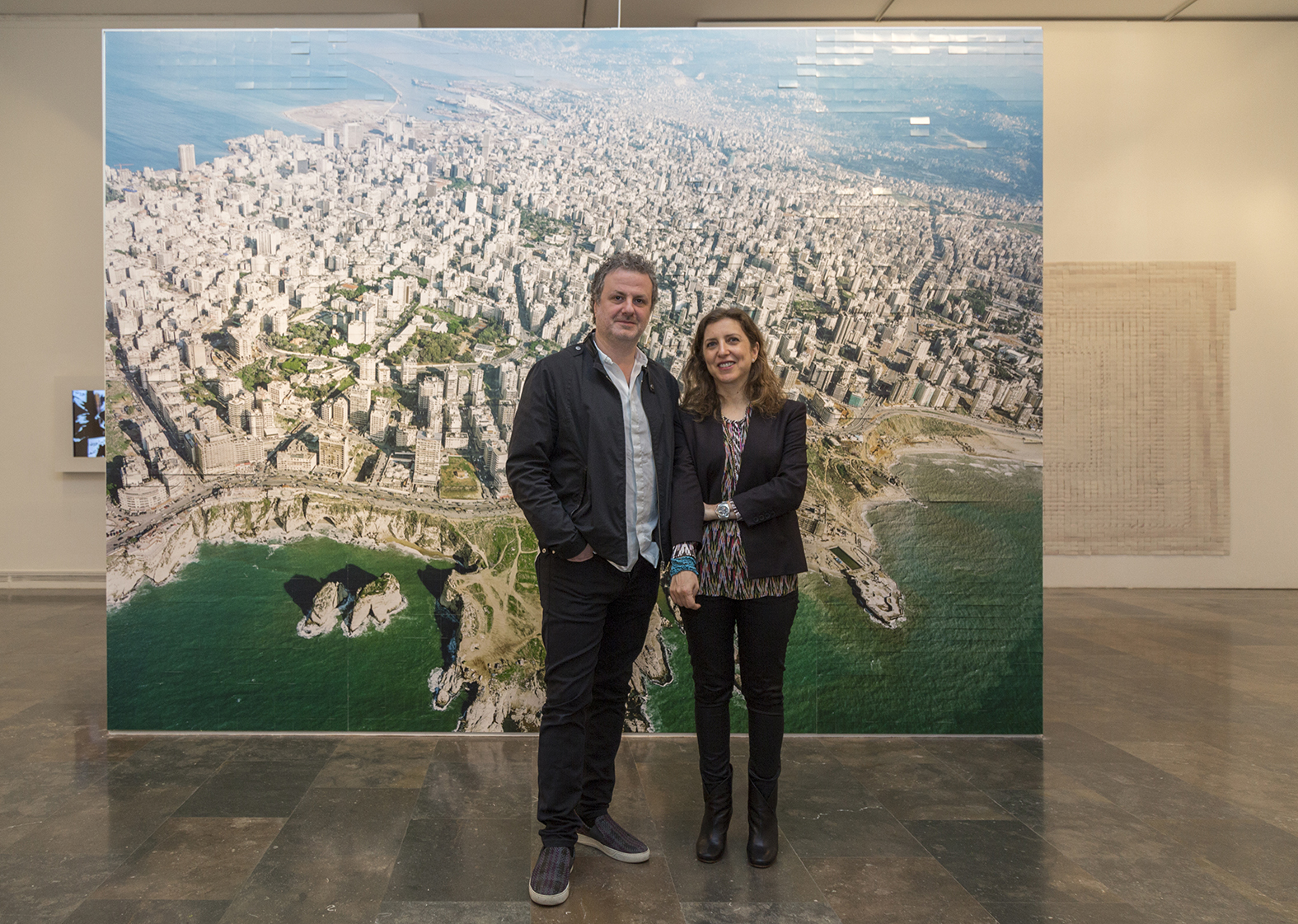
Joana Hadjithomas and Khalil Joreige in the IVAM, Valencia, 2017.

In 2017, Hadjithomas and Joreige won The Marcel Duchamp Prize for their presentation Unconformities, shown at the Pompidou Center in Paris. The installation constituted of core samples that had been collected over the past three years, underneath the cities omnipresent in the artists' history and thinking: Athens, Paris and Beirut. Hadjithomas and Joreige have described this project as an interrogation about the possible era of the Anthropocene.

Since 1999, the artists have collected over four thousand junk emails, digital scams intended to con their readers into sending financial aid. Over the course of many exhibitions and installations, Hadjithomas and Joreige created an itinerary around these modern day scams, and traced their history back to the literary tradition known as The Jerusalem Letter. As part of this project SCAMS (2014), Hadjithomas and Joreige created the sound and video installation The Rumor of the World, where they asked 38 amateur actors to read and incarnate these scams. A monograph under this title was published in 2015, edited by Omar Kholeif. The project has been theorized as a kind of true crime in its narrative blending of documentation and re-enactment.

In 2016, they presented works such as I stared at Beauty So Much, a series of video and photographic works questioning: how can poetry be pitted against the chaos of today's world? The series focuses on the place where fiction and real modes intersect and blur; and in 2017, they started developing the art project Unconformities which unveils the geological and archaeological undergrounds of cities. Under The Cold River Bed (2020) is their latest installation, as part of Unconformities, and tells the story of the "Nahr el Bared" refugee camp in the North of Beirut which was destroyed in 2007, leaving more than 30,000 people homeless. During reconstruction works, major archaeological discoveries were made, going down to as early as the Neolithic period and up to the great Roman city of Orthosia. Despite the important findings, the authorities were running out of time and refugee housing needed to be built. A decision was taken, with a lot of controversy, to backfill the entire camp and seal it as a sarcophagus, protecting the archeological discoveries with a gigantic geo-textile and covering it with a concrete screed. "The sculpture presented by the artists shows the thin membrane between the past and the future, an imprint of the sarcophagus of the camp, while documents tell its archeological, human and military history, its destruction, and its reconstruction.".

In 2016 and 2017, Hadjithomas and Joreige presented a large selection of their work from the late 1990s to the present day in 'Two Suns in a Sunset', a traveling museum exhibition that was shown at the Jeu de paume in Paris, Sharjah Art Foundation in Sharjah, Haus der Kunst in Munich and IVAM in Valencia.

Their artworks are part of major private and public collections including British Museum (London), Centre Georges Pompidou (Paris), Fond national d'art contemporain (France), MCA Chicago, Museum of Modern Art (Paris), Sharjah Art Foundation (UAE), Solomon R Guggenheim Museum (New York), and Victoria & Albert Museum (London) and they regularly present their works in solo and group exhibitions in museums and art centers around the world. They participated in many biennials such as Taipei, Venice, Istanbul, Lyon, Sharjah, Kochi, Gwangju, and the Paris Triennale.

They are represented by in Situ – fabienne leclerc in Paris (France), and The Third Line in Dubai (UAE).

== Awards and prizes ==
2017

The Marcel Duchamp Prize: won

2012

Best Documentary Award for The Lebanese Rocket Society: The Strange Tale of the Lebanese Space Race, Doha Tribeca Festival, Qatar.

Abraaj Capital Art Prize, Dubai, United Arab Emirates.

2008

Best Singular Film for Je veux voir, Syndicat Français de la Critique de Cinéma et des Films de Télévision, Paris, France.

Non-fiction and Documentary Award for Je veux voir, Gijón International Film Festival, Spain.

Prix Georges de Beauregard pour Khiam, FID Marseille

2005

Fipresci Prize and Don Quixote Award for A Perfect Day, Locarno International Film Festival, Switzerland.

Bayard d'Or for Best Actor and Special Jury Mention for A Perfect Day, Namur Francophone International Film Festival, Belgium.

Montgolfière d'Argent, Best Actor and SACEM Prize for Sound and Original Music for A Perfect Day, Festival des 3 Continents, Nantes, France.

Best Film (with distribution assistance) for A Perfect Day, Belfort Entrevues International Film Festival, France

2000

Best Film Award for Around the Pink House, Beirut International Film Festival, Lebanon.

== Filmography ==
· 2021: Memory Box, Fiction, 95min

. 2016: ISMYRNA, in conversation with Etel Adnan, Documentary, 53 min

· 2013: The Lebanese Rocket Society: The Strange Tale of the Lebanese Space Race, Documentary, 93 min

· 2008: Khiam 2000–2007, Documentary, 103 min

· 2008: Je veux voir (I want to see), fiction, 75 min

· 2006: Open the Door, Please, Fiction, 11 min

· 2005: A Perfect Day (Yawmon Akhar), Fiction, 88 min

· 2003: Ashes (Ramad), fiction, 26 min

. 2003: The Lost Film (Al Film Al Mafkoud), Documentary, 42 min

· 2001: Barmeh (Rounds), fiction, 8 min 2000: Khiam, Documentary, 52 min

· 1999: Around the Pink House (Al Bayt Al Zaher), fiction, 92 min

== Publications ==
Joana Hadjithomas & Khalil Joreige, Two suns in a Sunset, co-edition Jeu de Paume / Sharjah Art Foundation / Haus der Kunst / Institut Valencià d'Art Modern / Koenig Books, 2016.

Joana Hadjithomas & Khalil Joreige. The Rumors of the World. Rethinking Trust in the Age of the Internet, edited by Omar Kholeif, Berlin: Sternberg, 2015.

'Khalil Joreige & Joana Hadjithomas. Le centre d'art du 3bisf, Aix-en-Provence, et le Frac Provence-Alpes-Côte d'Azur', Semaine, special issue 'Ulysses', no. 18, 2014.

Joana Hadjithomas & Khalil Joreige, edited by Clément Dirié., Zurich: JRP | Ringier, Montreal: Leonard and Bina Ellen Art Gallery, 2013.

Le Cinéma de Joana Hadjithomas & Khalil Joreige. Entretiens avec Quentin Mével, Paris: éditions Independencia, 2013.

El Blanco de los Orígenes. Cuaderno de Textos e Imágenes sobre el Cine de Joana Hadjithomas y Khalil Joreige, Gijón: Gijón International Film Festival, 2008.

Joana Hadjithomas et Khalil Joreige. Je veux voir, Paris: Cahiers du cinéma, coll. 'Carnets de cinéastes', 2007.
