= Rabih Mroué =

Actor

- ربيع مروة
- Born: Rabih Mroué; 1967 (age 58–59); Beirut, Lebanon
- Education: Lebanese University (1989)
- Occupations: Actor, playwright, visual artist
- Spouse: Lina Saneh

Rabih Mroué (Arabic: ربيع مروة, born 1967) is a Lebanese stage and film actor, playwright, and visual artist. Rooted in theater, his work includes videos and installation art; the latter sometimes incorporates photography, text and sculpture.

== Biography ==
Born in Beirut, Mroué lives in Berlin, Germany. He is a grandson of Husayn Muruwwa. He graduated in theater in 1989 from Lebanese University, where he met his wife, Lina Saneh.

He has been creating theater pieces since 1990. Theater in Beirut revived in the years after the Lebanese Civil War, but Mroué and Saneh, who frequently collaborate, were among the first to push into avant-garde territory (and away from European influences), using venues such as the Russian Cultural Center, makeshift halls, and private homes. His works since the late 1990s "blur and confound the boundaries between theater and the visual arts", often using screens and projected images. Writing in The New York Times about Mroué's theater group, Kaelen Wilson-Goldie commented that "they are to Beirut what the Wooster Group is to New York: a blend of avant-garde innovation, conceptual complexity and political urgency, all grounded in earthy humor."

Mroué's performances, although scripted, are designed to appear more like improvised works in progress, reflecting his continuing theme of inquiry, focused more on provoking thought than presenting spectacle. Mroué has written of his own work, "My works deal with issues that have been swept under the table in the current political climate of Lebanon,"

Mroué's 2007 piece about the Lebanese Civil War, How Nancy Wished That Everything Was an April Fool's Joke, toured internationally. Banned domestically by the Lebanese Interior Ministry, it premiered in Tokyo. The ban was eventually lifted. In 2012, a series of photographs made with mobile phones at Homs, Syria showed persons killed during the fights of 2011/2012. Copies of the photographs were shown at dOCUMENTA (13) at Kassel, Germany with the title Pixelated Revolution.

Mroué is a board member of the Beirut Art Center.

Mroué has had solo exhibitions at Kunsthalle Mainz (2016); MoMA, New York (2015); Museum of Fine Arts, Mulhouse (2015); SALT, Istanbul (2014); Centro de Arte Dos de Mayo, Madrid (2013) 2012); Documenta, Kassel (2012); Art Association Stuttgart (2011); and BAK, Utrecht (2010).

Participated in major group exhibitions at the Institute of Contemporary Art, Boston (2018); House of World Cultures, Berlin (2017); Walker Art Center, Minneapolis (2016); MACBA, Barcelona (2015); Performa 09, New York (2009); XI Istanbul International Biennale (2009); Queen's Museum, New York (2009); Centre Pompidou, Paris (2008); and Tate Modern, London (2007).

His work is held in the collections of the MoMA in New York, the Centre Pompidou in Paris, the San Francisco Museum of Modern Art, the Art Institute of Chicago, the CA2M in Madrid, the MACBA in Barcelona and the Van Arbey Museum in Rotterdam, among others. Mroué is the co-founder of Beirut Arts Centre and a long-term partner of Ashkal Alwan, who has produced many of his performance pieces. He is currently an associate director of Kammerspiele Munich.

== Awards ==
- 2010 Spalding Gray Award (awarded by PS 122, The Andy Warhol Museum, On the Boards, and the Walker Art Center)., the Foundation for Contemporary Arts Grants to Artists award (2010), Prince Claus Funds Award 2011.

== Works (selected) ==
=== Theater pieces ===
- The Journey of Little Gandhi (1991). Adapted from Elias Khoury's 1989 novel of the same name.
- Extension 19 (1997).
- Come in Sir, We Are Waiting for You Outside (1998). Collaboration with Tony Chakar.
- Three Posters (2000). Collaboration with Elias Khoury.
- Biokraphia (2002) in collaboration with Lina Saneh.
- Who's Afraid of Representation (2005)
- How Nancy Wished That Everything Was an April Fool's Joke (2007). Collaboration with Fadi Toufic. Premiered at Tokyo International Arts Festival, Tokyo, Japan.
- Looking for a Missing Employee
- Yesterday's Man (2007), in collaboration with Tony Chakar and Tiago Rodrigues, premiered at La Mercè, Girona, Spain.
- Theater with dirty feet (2008). Premiered at HAU 2, Hebbel-Theater, Berlin, Germany.
- The inhabitants of images (2009). Premiered at Art Dubai, Dubai, United Arab Emirates. Originally a lecture/performance, later a video installation.
- Photo-Romance (2009). Collaboration with Lina Saneh. Premiered at Festival d'Avignon, Avignon.
- The Pixelated Revolution (2012). Premiered at PS 122, New York, New York.
- Riding on a Cloud (2013).

=== Video ===
- Face A/Face B (2001)

=== Installations ===
- With Soul, with Blood (2003).
- I, the undersigned (2007). Premiered 2008, Manifesta 7, Trentino-South Tyrol, Italy
- Noiseless (2008).
- Grandfather, Father and Son (2010). Premiered 2011, Prefix Institute of Contemporary Art, Toronto, Canada.
- The inhabitants of images (between 2009 and 2011)

=== Film roles ===
- Je Veux Voir (2008)
- Memory Box (2021)

== Notes ==
“La Table et Le Monde Hors Scène: Les Objects Scéniques Dans Le Théâtre Du Réel” by Carol Martin (“Tables and the Offstage World: Stage Objects and Theatre of the Real”) in Les Théâtres documentaires edited by Beatrice Picon-Vallin, Montlellier, Deuxième époque, 2019.

“Table on Stage: The Rise of the Messenger” by Carol Martin in Performance Studies in Motion: International Perspectives and Practices in the Twenty-First Century edited by Sharon Aaronson-Lehavi, Atay Citron and David Zerbib, Methuen, 2014.

“Uploaded and Unsanctioned” Introduction to The Pixelated Revolution by Rabih Mroué by Carol Martin, TDR, T215, pp. 19–24, 2012. Special issue of TDR (T191) “Documentary Theatre.” Essays by Carol Martin, Thomas Irmer, Wendy S. Herford, Linda Ben-Zvi, Stephen Bottoms, Janelle Reinelt, Andre Lepecki, an Interview with Doug Wright, and Pieces by Tim Etchells, Igal Ezraty, Michael Murphy, and Elias Khoury and Rabih Mroué.
