= Art Safiental =

International land-art biennale in Switzerland

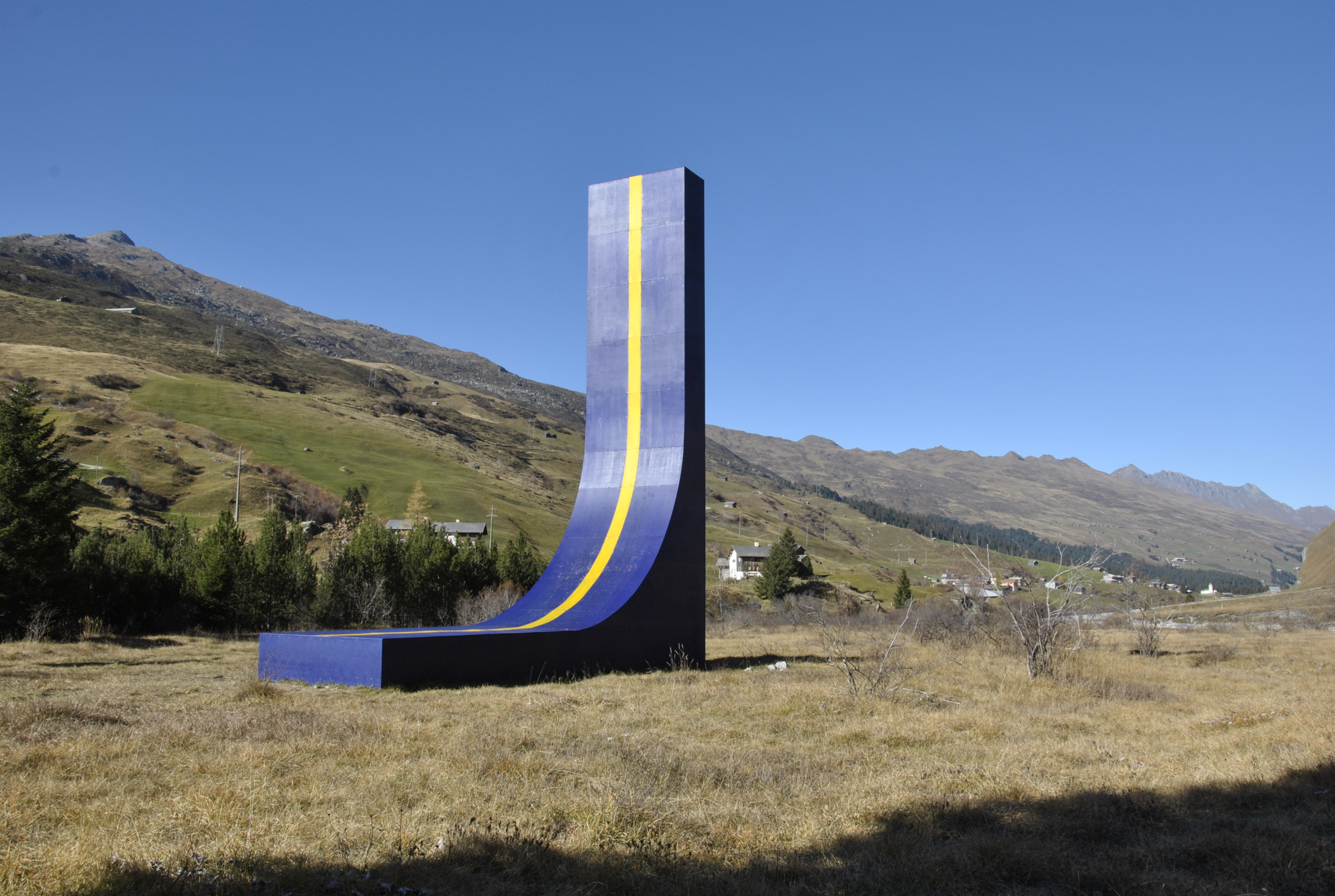
HIMMEL III by Bildstein + Glatz, 2018

Art Safiental is an international outdoor bienniale focused on land and environmental art, situated in the Safien Valley of Graubünden, Switzerland. Established in 2016, the biennial invites artists to create site-specific works that engage with the landscape.

== Editions ==
=== July 2 – Oct 16, 2016 — new land art ===
The artworks shown during New Land Art were created as part of the inaugural Alps Art Academy, where workshops were led by international artists in collaboration with 30 participants from 22 countries. The exhibition features six permanent large-scale installations, three interventions by guest artists, a mediation pavilion, 19 temporary works by Alps Art Academy participants, and four performances.

Permanent installations were made by the Atelier für Sonderaufgaben, Com&Com, Jaffa Lam, Les Frères Chapuisat, Filippo Minelli and Raumlabor. The guest artists of the first edition included; Paul Barsch, Delphine Chapuis Schmitz and H.R. Fricker.

Artists participating in the coupled group exhibition curated by Paul Barsch were: Bora Akinciturk, Beni Bischof, Adam Cruses, Hamishi Farah, Anne Fellner, Louisa Gagliardi, Charles Irwin, Lex Rathbone, Tanja Ritterbex, Sasha Ross and Ulrich Wulff.

=== July 7 – October 21, 2018 — horizontal – vertical ===
The central theme of the 2018 edition of Art Safiental and the Alps Art Academy was "Horizontal – Vertical." Since its inception in 2016, Johannes M. Hedinger has served as the curator and artistic director of the project. This year the temporary land and environmental art installations were distributed throughout the Safien Valley.

Participating artists were; Lita Albuquerque, Ueli Alder, Paul Barsch & Tilman Hornig, Bildstein | Glatz, Mirja Busch, Com&Com, DIG Collective, H.R. Fricker, Gabriela Gerber & Lukas Bardill, Bob Gramsma, Ingeborg Lüscher, Marianne Halter & Mario Marchisella, Steve Rowell, Analia Saban and Roman Signer.

=== July 18 – November 1, 2020 — analog – digital ===
The 2020 edition of Art Safiental adopts the theme Analog – Digital. In addition to traditional, walkable physical installations, the biennial introduced new digital and immersive formats that engage multiple senses and forms of communication.

Participating artists were; Nancy Baker Cahill, James Bridle, Com&Com, Fragmentin, HR Fricker, frölicher | bietenhader, Denis Handschin, Bruno Jakob, Jan Robert Leegte, Melodie Mousset, Patrick Rohner, Manuel Rossner, Sara Rutz, Curdin Tones, Lucie Tuma, Marie Velardi, Ester Vonplon.

=== July 02 – October 23, 2022 — learning from the earth ===
The 2022 edition of Art Safiental featured 15 projects addressing the interconnected crises of climate change, pandemics, economic instability, and global conflicts. The Artworks situated themselves as commentaries and proposals that examine the present and propose alternatives to current development.

Participating artists were: Lara Almarcegui, Badel/Sarbach, Ursula Biemann, Julius von Bismarck, Buchli/Isenschmid, Com&Com, Saskia Edens, Lithic Alliance, Marcus Maeder, !Mediengruppe Bitnik, Dharmendra Prasad, Simon/Odermatt, Gerda Steiner & Jörg Lenzlinger and Ben Vautier.

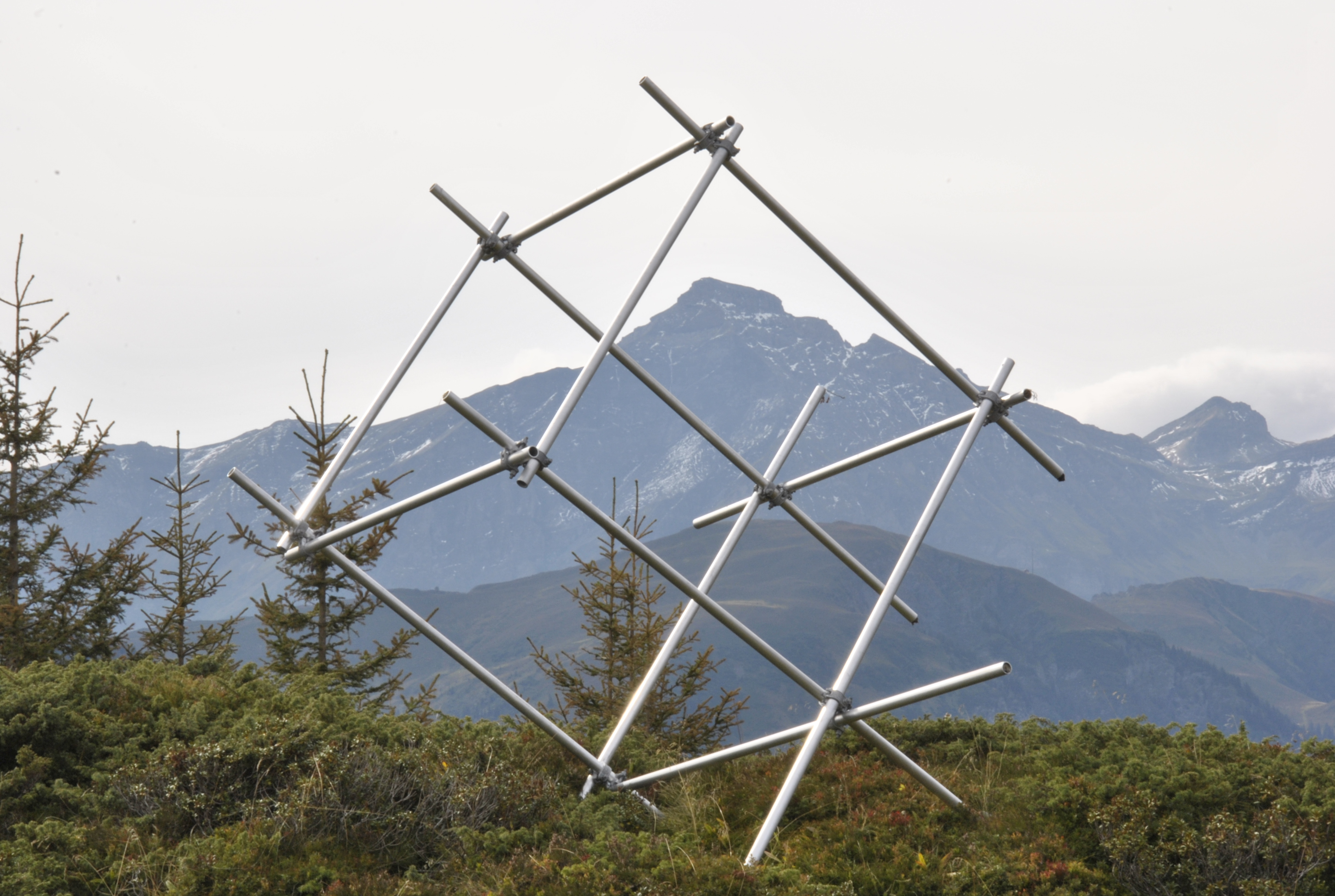
Moving Landscapes by QUARTO, 2024

=== July 6 – October 20, 2024 — what if? songs from tomorrowlands ===
The theme of 2024 'What If?' is intended to serve as a tool encouraging viewers to move beyond the familiar. Alongside the biennale, a publication was released containing essays by Ravi Agarwal, Annemarie Bucher, Ishita Chakraborty, Damian Christinger, Magali Dougoud, Hayat Erdoğan, Anne-Laure Franchette, Johannes M. Hedinger, Kim de l'Horizon, Josiane Imhasly, Monica Ursina Jäger, Dominik Landwehr, Joanna Leśnierowska, Paulina Lopez, Harald Welzer, and André Wilkens. It also features artworks by Ravi Agarwal and Paulina Lopez, Paloma Ayala, Magali Dougoud, Hemauer/Keller, Monica Ursina Jäger, Ola Maciejewska, Sujit Mallik, Vibeke Mascini, Farah Mulla, Ernesto Neto, QUARTO, Stefanie Salzmann, Renae Shadler, Andrea Todisco, and Huhtamaki Wab.

Art Safiental 2024 featured artworks by Ravi Agarwal & Paulina Lopez, Paloma Ayala & Sascha Skraban, Magali Dougoud, ZOMBIE MERMAIDS, Hemauer/Keller, Monica Ursina Jäger, Ola Maciejewska, Vibeke Mascini, Ernesto Neto, QUARTO, Stefanie Salzmann, Renae Shadler, Andrea Francesco Todisco, and Huhtamaki Wab.

== Publications ==
Landscape (2020)

Edited by Johannes M. Hedinger and Hanna Hölling in editorial collaboration with Mirja Busch, German/English, Vexer Verlag St.Gallen / Berlin, ISBN 978-3-909090-94-5

Learning from the earth (2023)

Edited by Johannes M. Hedinger in editorial collaboration with Hendrick Krone, German/English, Vexer Verlag St.Gallen / Berlin, ISBN 978-3-907112-64-9

What if? Letters to the future (2024)

Edited by Johannes M. Hedinger in editorial collaboration with Hendrick Krone, German/English, Vexer Verlag St.Gallen / Berlin, ISBN 978-3-907112-87-8
