= Jesse Aaron Dwyre =

Canadian actor, drummer and writer

Jesse Dwyre
- Born: Kingston, Ontario
- Occupations: Actor, drummer, writer
- Years active: 1999–present

Jesse Aaron Dwyre Canadian actor, drummer and writer. He has appeared in film, theatre and television. He currently plays Henry in HBO's crime series Jett, and young Hogarth in His Master's Voice. He has starred in independent films Imitation and Adam's Wall. As a drummer and songwriter, Jesse is a member of rock group The Breakables.

== Early life ==
Jesse Aaron Joseph Dwyre was born on 15 March, in Kingston Ontario, Canada. He grew up in nearby the rural town of Lyndhurst, Ontario with his mother Sandra and father William Joseph. He has one younger sibling Joshua. Jesse's grandfather, Stanley Webb M.D, served as the practicing medical doctor for the surrounding area for almost fifty years.

Jesse attended Sweet's Corners Elementary School, Rideau District High School and Queen Elizabeth Vocational Institute in Kingston. His early days of acting included classes at Theatre 5 and Theatre Complete Focus Programs eventually leading to performances at The Grand Theatre and the Brockville Arts Centre. Jesse also studied at the Kingston School of Music with a keen focus on jazz drumming.

== Training ==
Jesse Dwyre is a graduate of the National Theatre School of Canada in Montréal, The Birmingham Conservatory at the Stratford Festival, the Canadian Film Centre Actor's Conservatory in Toronto, and the Banff Centre for the Arts in the Rocky Mountains of Alberta.

== Stage ==
Jesse has performed in the Stratford Festival and Conservatory productions of; Romeo and Juliet, Caesar and Cleopatra starring Christopher Plummer, Three Sisters directed by Martha Henry, MacBeth,Twelfth Night, Measure for Measure, The Provoked Wife, Bartholomew Fair and in Michael Langham's final production of Love's Labour's Lost at the Tom Patterson Theatre.

Jesse played Mark Rothko's protegé Ken in Red at the Segal Centre for Performing Arts. Jesse also appeared with the Soulpepper Theatre Company in Dickens' Great Expectations and Farther West. For the Foster Festival in Niagara, Jesse played lead cowboy Bob Hicks in Norm Foster's Outlaw as well as the lovesick soldier Frederick in the World Premiere of 1812; both shows were directed by Shaw Festival veteran Jim Mezon.

On western Canadian stages, Jesse appeared as Harry Becker in Theatre Calgary's production of Counsellor-at-Law. The Betty Mitchell Awards nominated Jesse for his work as the grieving son Ben Mercer in Of the Fields, Lately directed by R.H. Thomson. Jesse also originated the role of Henry in the psycho-thriller Get Away at Alberta Theatre Projects' in Calgary.

Other notable performances include premieres at Toronto's Tarragon Theatre where Jesse portrayed Jordan in the satirical Redbone Coonhound and the narcissistic Karlmann in a production of the razor sharp satire,The Ugly One. The critically acclaimed Ugly One saw two remounts, was nominated for six Dora Awards and won two Doras- including Outstanding Production.

Returning to classics, Jesse tackled the iconic title role in Romeo and Juliet at Rideau Theatre, the lover Lysander in A Midsummer Night's Dream for Driftwood Theatre, Joseph in Pirandello's The Vise for Beatty Productions/Stratford, Lucifer in Euridice at SummerWorks and Trofimov in The Cherry Orchard at the Guild Festival Theatre.

== Novels Adapted to Stage ==
Jesse has devoted a large part of his work to bringing classic novels to life on stage. He has portrayed the central literary characters Bernard Marx in Brave New World at Theatre Passe Muraille and Oscar Matzerath in The Tin Drum for Unspun Theatre.

Adapting modern literature for the stage, Jesse was the first actor to portray the heroic bat Shade in the Silverwing series, written by Kenneth Oppel. Silverwing premiered at Manitoba Theatre for Young People under the direction of Kim Selody with special effects by Deco Dawson.

Jesse also worked to develop a staged version of the graphic novel Ducks: Two Years in the Oil Sands at the Banff Centre for the Arts.

== Awards ==
Jesse's performances (individual and collaborative) have been nominated by numerous Canadian award committees:

- Outstanding Performance Actor in Leading Role - Of the Fields, Lately - Betty Mitchell Awards.
- The Tyrone Guthrie Award - Stratford Festival **
- Outstanding Performance by an Actor in a Supporting Role - Ugly One - My Entertainment Awards
- Outstanding Production - Ugly One - Dora Mavor Moore Awards **
- Outstanding Performance by an Ensemble - Ugly One - My Entertainment Awards
- Outstanding performance by SummerWorks Actor - Euridice - My Entertainment Awards **
- Outstanding Performance by an Ensemble - Tin Drum - Dora Mavor Moore Awards
- Outstanding Production - Brave New World- My Entertainment Awards
- Outstanding Performance by an Ensemble - Brave New World - My Entertainment Awards **

Indicates award won **

== Feature film ==
Jesse starred in the title role of Adam's Wall; a tale of forbidden love between a Jewish boy and a Lebanese girl directed by Michael Mackenzie and produced by Ziad Touma of Couzin Films. Jesse played opposite Lebanese starlet Flavia Bechara.

In Imitation (film) directed by Frederico Hidalgo, Jesse Dwyre played the lead role of Fenton, a young Montréaler who becomes entangled in a love affair as he helps Teressa (played by Vanessa Bauche) search for her husband.

Jesse also traveled to Budapest to film the part of young Hogarth in György Pálfi's sci-fi thriller His Master's Voice. The project was a Canadian/Hungarian co-production and premiered at the 2018 Tokyo International Film Festival.

== Short film ==
Silas & the Tomb is a short film written by and starring Jesse Aaron Dwyre. Set in the late nineteenth century, it is the tale of an undertaker who cuts corners and cannot seem to bury his mistakes. Dwyre adapted the screenplay from the classic short story In the Vault by H.P.Lovecraft. The project was funded by the Bravo network.

In The Archivist, Dwyre plays Cedric, a projectionist at an aging movie theatre who uncovers a series of mysterious disappearances. The film was written and directed by Jeremy Ball and shot by cinematographer Guy Godfree.

Dwyre has also appeared in short films: Dangerous Heroes by Croatian director Svjetlana Jaklenec, The Cats by Turkish director Hakan Oztan, and The Fursteneau Mysteries by Ukrainian/Canadian director Illya Klymkiw.

== Television ==
Jesse Dwyre's television appearances include; Henry in HBO's crime drama Jett opposite Carla Gugino, Romeo in Shakespeare in Words & Music on the Bravo Network, Dr. Josh Nolan in NBC's 10.5: Apocalypse, the poet Leigh Hunt in Cine Qua Non's Mary Shelley, and the eccentric arms dealer Colin in CBS's Beauty & the Beast (2012 TV series).

In his early years, Jesse was featured in music videos for I Mother Earth, Marcy Playground, the YTV show Fries with That? and CBC's The Fifth Estate.

== Music ==
Jesse is currently the drummer for The Breakables. The group's debut album (self-titled) was independently released in 2024. All four members of the band compose and write lyrics allowing the group to offer an eclectic mix of nostalgic indie-rock and melodic chamber-pop.

Jesse was drummer and lyricist for the now defunct pop- punk band Stylewinder: the group independently released two full-length albums- Omnivigant and Incidental Music.

Along with recording sessions for various pop, country and gospel artists, Jesse has also drummed for Swing Gitan a Django Reinhardt tribute act, the Serbian gypsy-punk group Roma Carnival and the 70's blues-inspired The Slow & Easy band in Toronto. He is a past member of the Trespassers - a rock/pop quintet composed of theatre artists which was fronted by Lucy Peacock (actress).

Jesse is a registered SOCAN writer and lyricist.

== Educator & Development ==
Jesse has workshopped and developed numerous new scripts with: Tarragon Theatre, Theatre Smash, Thousand Islands Playhouse, CanStage, Montréal Playwrights, Cinars Festival, ATP PlayRites, Theatre Calgary, Imago Theatre, Victoria Playhouse, Factory Theatre, SummerWorks among others.

Jesse has taught acting sessions through the Stratford Shakespeare Festival's Education Department. He has also participated in workshops, tours and talk back sessions designed to make professional theatre accessible.

Jesse continues his collaboration with Shakespearience: a not- for-profit educational organization in Toronto. Founded and led by Marvin Karon, Shakespearience places professional actors directly into elementary and high school classrooms to help students decode and activate the language of William Shakespeare.
