= Maeder =

Maeder is a German surname, a variant of Mader, particularly widespread in Switzerland. It may refer to the following notable people:

- Al Maeder (1906–1984), American football player
- Alphonse Maeder (1882–1971), Swiss physician
- Clara Fisher (née Maeder; 1811–1898), British actress
- Frederick G. Maeder (1840–1891), American playwright and actor
- Hans Maeder (1909–1988), American educator
- Jo Maeder, American writer and voiceover artist
- Kurt Maeder (born 1952), Swiss equestrian
- Marcus Maeder (born 1971), Swiss sound artist, acoustic ecologist and composer of electronic music
- Max Maeder (born 2006), Singaporean kitesurfer
- Pascal Maeder, Swiss-Canadian film producer and cyberneticist
- Nic and Sebastian Maeder, brothers and Australian musicians who formed the rock band Maeder
