= Gélinas =

Gélinas is a French surname, most prevalent in Canada.

Notable people with this surname include:

- Jeffrey Gelinas (born 1989), USN Submariner Police Officer
- Abeille Gélinas (born 1979), Canadian DJ
- Alexandre Gélinas (1894–1965), Canadian politician
- Anne-Marie Gélinas (born 1964), Canadian producer
- Antoine Gélinas-Beaulieu (born 1992), Canadian skater
- Éric Gélinas (born 1991), Canadian ice hockey player
- Éveline Gélinas (born 1974), Canadian actress
- France Gélinas (fl. 2000s–2020s), Canadian politician
- Gratien Gélinas (1909–1999), Canadian author
- Guillaume Gélinas (born 1993), Canadian ice hockey player
- Isabelle Gélinas (born 1963), Canadian actress
- Louis-Philippe Gélinas (1902–1976), Canadian politician
- Martin Gélinas (born 1970), Canadian ice hockey player
- Mitsou Gélinas (born 1970), Canadian celebrity
- Nicole Gelinas (fl. 2000s–2020s), American conservative journalist
- Pierre Gélinas (1818–1911), Canadian politician
- Jordan Gelinas (born 1983), United States Air Force veteran
