= Flavia Bechara =

Lebanese actress

Flavia Bechara is a Lebanese actress who has starred in the films The Kite and Adam's Wall.

In The Kite (French: Le Cerf-volant, Arabic: Tayyara men wara — طيّارة من ورق), a 2003 Lebanese film by the director Randa Chahal Sabag, she plays the leading role. The film tells the story of fifteen-year-old Lamia (played by Bechara), who lets her kite fly into the Israeli side of the border and attempts to retrieve it. She meets Israeli Arab border guard Youssef (played by Maher Bsaibes), who works in a tower overlooking both sides of the barbed-wire fence separating the countries. Her family is outraged, so they send her off to marry her cousin on the other side of the border. Lamia refuses to sleep with her new husband, instead maintaining an interest in Youssef. The Kite was shown at the 2003 Venice Film Festival where it won the "Lion d'argent" of the "Grand Prix du Jury" of the festival.

In Adam's Wall, a 2008 movie tale of forbidden love between a Jewish boy and a Lebanese girl directed by Michael Mackenzie, Bechara plays role of Yasmine Gibran opposite Jesse Aaron Dwyre in the role of Adam Levy, a Jewish teenager from Montreal's Mile-End district, who falls head over heels in love with her. Both are torn by their love against the traditional opposition.

== Filmography ==
- 2003: Le Cerf-volant playing role of Lamia
- 2008: Adam's Wall in the role of Yasmine Gibran
- 2019: All This Victory in the role of Rana
- 2020: Awake in the role of Dana Nasr
