= Jimmywork =

- Directed by: Simon Sauvé
- Written by: Simon Sauvé
- Produced by: Simon Sauvé; Pascal Maeder
- Starring: Jimmy Webber
- Edited by: Simon Sauvé
- Production company: Atopia
- Distributed by: Atopia
- Release dates: September 15, 2004 (Toronto International Film Festival); April 8, 2005 (Canada)
- Running time: 82 minutes
- Country: Canada
- Language: English

Jimmywork is a 2004 mockumentary film written and directed by Simon Sauvé and produced by Atopia.

On the eve of his 50th birthday Jimmy W finds himself at the cross roads of his existence. For him it's now or never. The time has come to become rich and maybe even famous. Pretending to be an American Producer, he offers his services to the St-Tite Rodeo to develop an ad campaign to attract American tourists. Charmed as much by his demeanor as well as by his proposition, the Rodeo organizers call him in for a meeting to present his project. The meeting turns out to be a complete fiasco. Suspicious about Jimmy, they politely turn him down. Jimmy returns home furious and determined to get his revenge. Operating from his kitchen, he plans an elaborate scheme to extort the beer stock from the Rodeo valued at a quarter of million dollars.
