= Karen Simpson =

Karen Simpson may refer to:

- Karen Simpson (actress)
- Karen Simpson (politician)
