= A Silent Love =

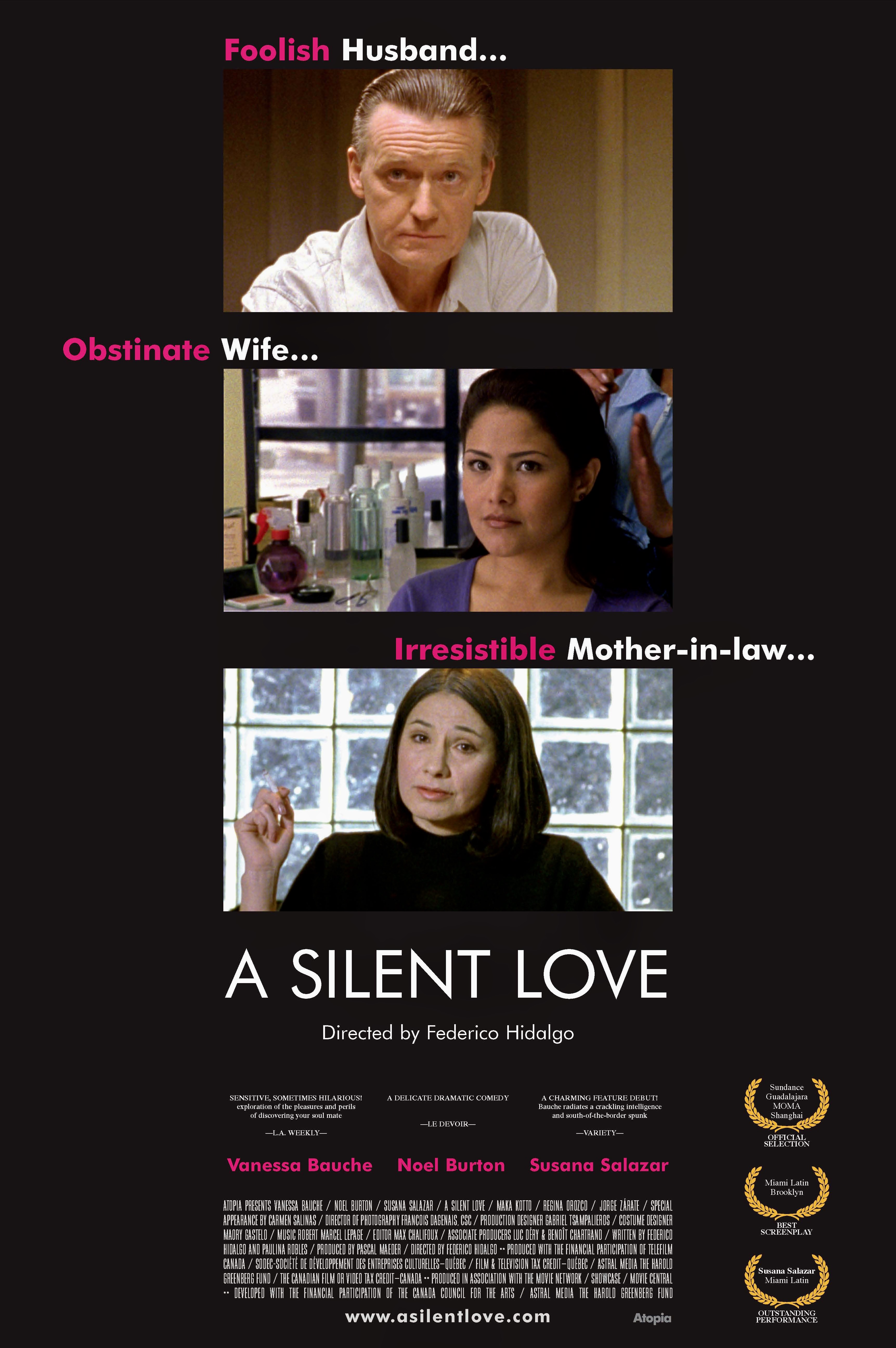
- US theatrical release poster
- Spanish: Un amor silencioso
- Directed by: Federico Hidalgo
- Written by: Federico Hidalgo; Paulina Robles
- Produced by: Pascal Maeder
- Starring: Noel Burton; Vanessa Bauche; Susanna Salazar
- Cinematography: François Dagenais
- Edited by: Max Chalifoux
- Production company: Atopia
- Distributed by: Atopia
- Release date: September 10, 2004
- Running time: 100 minutes
- Country: Canada
- Languages: English; Spanish
- Budget: $1.1

A Silent Love (Spanish: Un amor silencioso) is a 2004 Canadian (Quebec) film written and directed by Federico Hidalgo and produced by Atopia.

The film premiered at the Sundance Film Festival in January 2004 then opened in a limited release on October 29, 2004 in New York City and Los Angeles before widening to over 25 theaters across the US and Canada. A Silent Love is the first Canadian release made by Atopia, although it was shortly followed by another Hidalgo film, Imitation. The film is quasi-silent but when dialogue is used, it is substantially Spanish despite the film's Canadian production.

== Synopsis ==
The protagonist, Norman Green, is a middle-aged film studies professor in Montreal. In an attempt to form a meaningful relationship, Norman joins an online dating website which allows him to woo a young Mexican woman with a passionate email. He then travels to Mexico to meet her. The dating website calculates that Norman has a 61% chance of success in this anticipated relationship. Upon meeting, Norman gives flowers to object of his affection, in a traditional attempt to woo her. However, he finds that the woman he'd been speaking to, Gladys, is strong, independent, and does not fit the role of the international bride which he was expecting. Norman also finds that Gladys is living with her widowed mother, Fernanda. While Gladys somewhat reluctantly agrees to marry Norman, she insists that her mother live with them for the first few months.

Despite their best intentions, Gladys and Norman never settle into their marriage. Gladys is overwhelmed by the new culture around her, the language barrier and is always reminded that she was brought from a less affluent country to marry an older man. The implication being that Norman wanted a submissive wife. Their substantial age gap also causes disagreements within the relationship. Meanwhile, Norman develops romantic feelings for Fernanda, with whom he is more in tune and much closer in age, which the latter reciprocates. Ashamed of her feelings, which she deems inappropriate considering the circumstance, Fernanda returns to Mexico to put distance between them. Shortly thereafter, Norman joins her, where he confesses his love for her and desire to live life by her side.

Amidst this, Gladys, who is newly divorced, chooses to stay in Montreal where she will start a new life.

== Cast ==
- Noel Burton as Norman
- Vanessa Bauche as Gladys
- Susana Salazar as Fernanada
- Maka Kotto as Andre
- Regina Orozco as Ana Fransisca
- Jorge Zarate as Valdivia
- Carmen Salinas as Georgina
- Paula Jean Hixson as Molly

== Awards ==
The film was a Genie Award nominee for Best Original Screenplay (Hidalgo, Paulina Robles) and Best Supporting Actress at the 25th Genie Awards in 2005.

It received three Vancouver Film Critics Circle nominations at the Vancouver Film Critics Circle Awards 2004, for Best Canadian Film, Best Actor in a Canadian Film (Burton) and Best Supporting Actress in a Canadian Film (Salazar).

The film also won awards for Best Screenplay at the Brooklyn International Film Festival and the Miami Latin Film Festival.

== Reception ==
Critical Response

A Silent Love has been praised as a twist on the notorious "mail-order bride" trope. The nuanced characters, brought to life by critically acclaimed actors, contributed to creating a more realistic story, which will appeal to disillusioned adult viewers. It has also been acclaimed for breaking down stereotypes concerning immigrants, particularly those who wed citizens. It refuses to fall trap to the "green card" excuse.
