= Patricia Paquin =

Canadian television personality

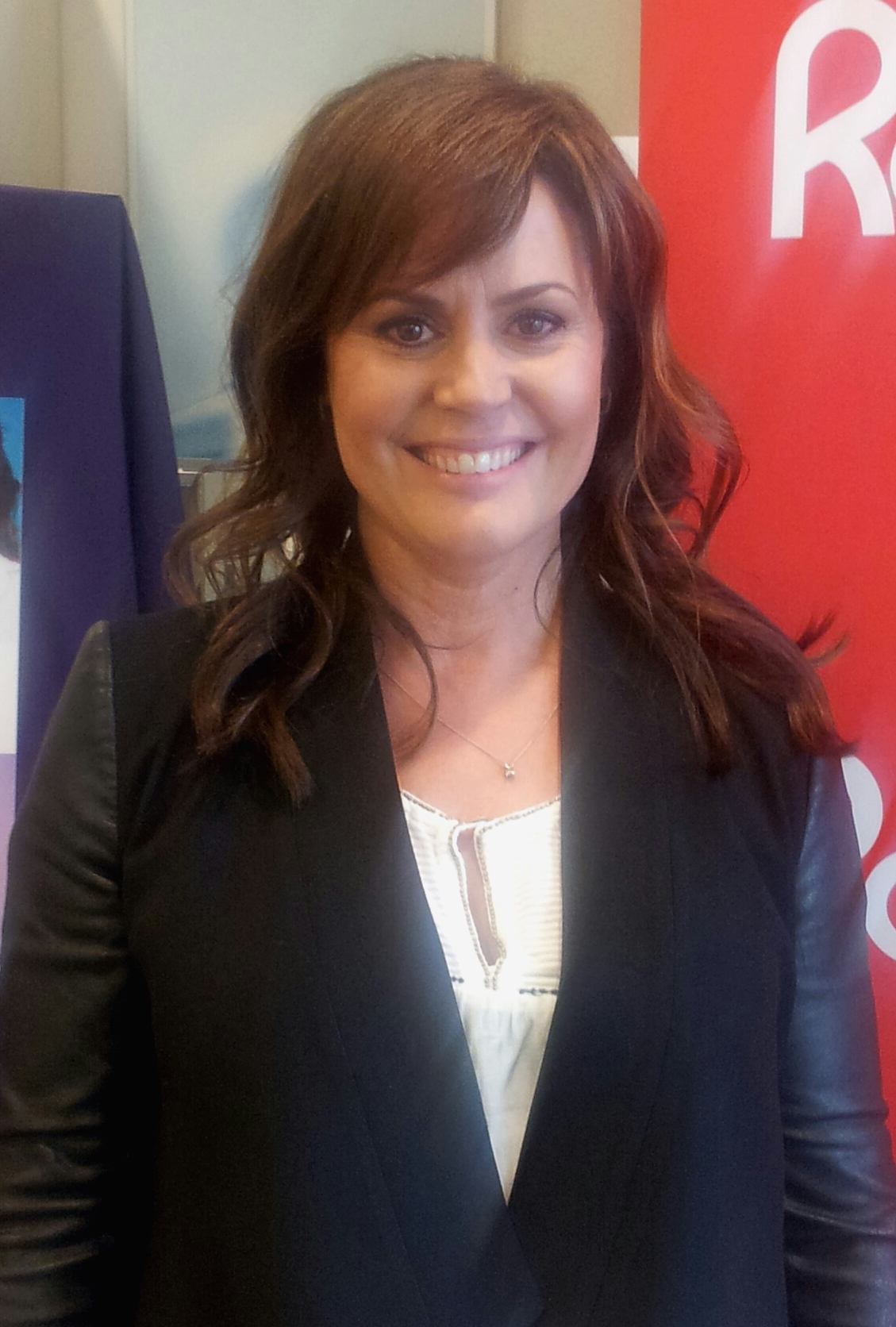
Patricia Paquin

Patricia Paquin (born October 25, 1968, in Montreal, Quebec) is a television personality from Quebec. She also is an activist against muscular dystrophy.

Born October 25, 1968, in Montreal, she is the daughter of Marcel Paquin (born 1935) and Gisèle Matteau-Paquin (born 1935). She has two sisters, Caroline (born 1961) and Dominique (born 1963), and one twin brother Patrice Paquin (born 1968). She studied at Collège Français de Montréal. She has a son with Mathieu Gratton. Thanks to her television series Chambres en ville, televised between 1989 and 1996, she became a star in her native Quebec. She is the recipient of two MetroStar Awards and one Gémeaux Award.
