= The Kite (2003 film) =

2003 film

- Directed by: Randa Chahal Sabag
- Written by: Randa Chahal Sabag
- Starring: Flavia Bechara; Maher Bsaibes; Julia Kassar; Liliane Nemri; Ziad Rahbani
- Release date: 2003
- Running time: 80 minutes
- Country: Lebanon
- Language: Levantine Arabic

The Kite (French: Le Cerf-volant, Levantine Arabic: طيّارة من ورق ṭiyyāra min waraʔ) is a 2003 Lebanese film by the director Randa Chahal Sabag. It tells the story of a 15-year-old Lebanese girl, from a Druze community, who is forced to marry her cousin across the Israeli border, but finds herself in love with an Israeli soldier. Le Cerf-volant was Sabag's most commercially and critically successful movie, and her last; she died in 2008. The film was Lebanon's official submission for the Academy Award for Best Foreign Language Film at the 76th Academy Awards. Although it never received a theatrical release in the United States, the film was released to DVD in 2009 by First Run Features.

== Plot ==
The Kite is set in a village called Deir Mimas over the border of the pre-occupied territories in southern Lebanon (occupied by Israel). The 16-year-old Lebanese girl Lamia (Flavia Bechara) lives with her family in the village. Her family had promised to marry her off to her cousin Samy (Edmond Haddad), who lives on the Israeli side. Lamia's mother, Amira (Randa Asmar) was dejected and unwilling to send her daughter away because that meant that Lamia could never come back because of the tense political situation at the border.

Lamia, too, is completely reluctant to agree to the marriage because she has never seen him nor does she love him. She is simply a naïve young teenager who has no idea about marriage. Similarly, Samy was not much interested in marrying his cousin either; however, he agreed to the marriage because he thought it would help Lamia escape her village.

To conduct the wedding, since there is a no-man's land between the Lebanon side and Israel side, they communicate with each other through megaphones and can only see each other through binoculars. Before the marriage, Lamia had to get a pass from the authorities to cross the border. The day of the wedding, the entire village gathers at the border gates to witness Lamia being sent across the border. On the Israeli side, people wave a white flag as a signal to start. Lamia hugs her family and starts her long walk towards the Israeli border in her majestic wedding gown and a lone bouquet. She keeps looking back, knowing that she may never return.

Meanwhile, the movie reveals that an Israeli soldier, Youssef (Maher Bsaibes), stationed at the border is in love with Lamia. After Lamia comes to live in Samy's house, she barely eats or sleeps or talks; this goes on for 20 days. Later, during an argument with her husband, Lamia tells him that she loves someone else, who turns out to be Youssef. Samy's family gets frustrated with Lamia and takes her to the border so that she can talk to her mother. Lamia is given binoculars, but instead of looking at her mother, she turns to look at Youssef and exchanges smiles with him. Both families fume at this and her binoculars are taken away.

Because of her continuous unpleasant behavior, Lamia becomes unwanted in Samy's house and she is forced to go back. Samy warns Lamia that no one else would want her anymore if he divorces her and she would be alone forever. Lamia faces a great dilemma because she does not want to be with her husband but she does not want to go back either (because of Youssef).

Unfortunately, Lamia returns to Deir Mimas, to her and the soldier's utter disappointment. She becomes a subject of insult in her home village, which is seen when a shop-owner does not accept money from her, calling it "money of dishonor".

The ending of the movie has been purposely left vague and open to interpretation. It appears like a dream or surreal scene where Lamia magically crosses the fence of the border and finally gets to be with Youssef.

== Reception ==
The Kite was Sabag's biggest commercial and critical success, with generally positive reviews. Nitrate Online described it as a story of "life and love in the middle of conflict" with a "refreshingly original appeal that crosses some formidable barriers", while Strictly Film School called it a "poignant, humorous, and exquisitely realized" film. Less than a year after Sabag's death, when the film was out on DVD, Michael Atkinson described it on IFC.com as a "tragicomedy" and "absurdist" film, and wrote that the director's tone was "gentle and generous", except for a single scene involving the discovery of an aborted fetus which he described as "tasteless". Atkinson added that Sabag considered the points of view of each character in the film, even that of the Israeli officers.

When Sabag won the Silver Lion, the Beirut-based Daily Star called the occasion "a triumph for Lebanese film". The World Press Review described this kind of reception as "a radical departure from the hostile press the controversial filmmaker (Sabag) once received".

Cineuropa said that despite the subject of the story being tragic, Sabag tried to deal with it using irony and managed to "triumph life, love and imagination" at the end. Both male and female critics on the French film blog L'Oil sur L'Ecran gave it 4 out of 5 stars, with one of them noting that the film was reminiscent of Elia Suleiman's 2002 film Divine Intervention.

== Awards ==
- Global Lens (Global Film Initiative), New York, 2008
- Prix de la bande Sonore, Bastia, 2004
- Prix de TV5, Belgium, 2004
- Silver Lion, Grand Prize of the Jury, Venice Film Festival, 2003
- Prix de la Lanterne Magique, Venice Film Festival, 2003
- Prix de la paix- Gillo Pontecorvo, Venice Film Festival, 2003
- Prix international de la musique et du film, Auxerre, 2003
