= Dussault Inc. =

- Genre: Reality; Docusoap
- Created by: Lawrence McDonald; Ziad Touma
- Country of origin: Canada
- Original language: English
- No. of seasons: 2
- No. of episodes: 32

Production
- Running time: 30 minutes
- Production company: Paperny Entertainment

Original release
- Network: Citytv
- Release: September 24, 2011 – April 14, 2012

Dussault Inc. is a docu-sitcom television show about struggling fashion business. The series is conceived and produced by Paperny Entertainment and directed by Ziad Touma. Season 1 was broadcast on Saturdays at 8:30 pm on Citytv. Season 2 was broadcast Saturdays at 8 pm on Bio Canada.

== Synopsis ==
Jason Dussault is a Canadian celebrity streetwear designer in partnership with Mashiah Vaughn. They both launched a flagship store "Dussault Apparel" in Vancouver, selling high-priced custom-made jeans, hoodies, and baseball caps to rock-and-roll celebrities. But when the economy took a turn for the worse, they lost it all.

Now, back in Vancouver with two sons to raise, 15-year-old Ayden (a son of Mashiah from an earlier relation Jesee) and 3-year-old Ronin – Jason is risking everything to bring "Dussault Apparel" back, while Mashiah is promoting her own bath cosmetics line called "Open Sundaes".

With relationship challenges, heated family feuds, and tight budgets, and to raise two kids, it is a big task.

== Cast ==
- Jason Dussault as himself
- Mashiah Vaughn-Hulbert as herself
- Fiona Forbes as herself
- Ayden as himself
- Ronin as himself

== Episodes ==
Season 1

1. New Showroom (September 24, 2011)
2. Warrior Ring (October 1, 2011)
3. Snowboard Panda (October 8, 2011)
4. Burlesque Beauties (October 15, 2011)
5. Hong Kong City (October 22, 2011)
6. The Ultimate Fight (October 29, 2011)
7. Ronin's Elephants
8. Don't Break My Art
9. A Place to Call Home
10. Cowboys and Angels
11. Another Brick in the Wall
12. Africa Calling
13. Hollywood Dreaming
14. The Swimsuit Issues
15. Sex Therapy
16. What Happens in Vegas

Season 2

1. Hollywood or Bust
2. Design Challenges
3. Street Cred
4. Mischievous
5. Double-Cross
6. A Star Is Porn
7. Rebounds
8. Hulk Smash
9. Poker Face
10. Teen Spirit
11. Two Birds, One Stone
12. What's Eating Gilbert Gottfried
13. French Touch
14. The Duke Is Hazzard
15. Time Off
16. Should I Stay or Should I Go?
