= Chambres en ville =

Television series

Chambres en ville (Rooms in town) is a Québécois téléroman written by Sylvie Payette that aired on TVA from 1989 to 1996. The show was feted on its 35th anniversary in 2024.

== Plot ==
This is the story of flatmates living in a dormitory. Louise is one of the central character in this series along with Rodrigue "Pete" Béliveau. Louise welcomes students into her residence and ends up taking on different roles for her guests: a mother, nurse, listener, psychologist, and probation agent among others. The students develop a close relationship with her and most of them keep coming back each year. Even after they depart, Louise is always available for them. Through different students' experiences, we are witness to all sorts of wild and turbulent events. Some of the subjects raised include; wars between roommates, sex (often during action), sickness (AIDS) and cheating, all of which make for an interesting soap opera (téléroman).

== Cast ==
- Francis Reddy : Rodrigue "Pete" Béliveau
- Vincent Graton : Gabriel Lévesque
- Pascale Bussières : Marie Vincent
- Michel Charette : Samuel
- Gregory Charles : Julien Philippe
- Marie-Josée Croze : Noémie Vanasse
- Isabelle Cyr : Hélène Cyr
- Louise Deschâtelets : Louise Leblanc
- Julie Deslauriers : Caroline Béliveau
- Bruce Dinsmore : Simon Campbell
- Daniel Dô : Jean Phan
- Anne Dorval : Lise «Lola» Corbeil
- Jean-Emery Gagnon : Fred Côté
- René Gagnon : Benoit
- Claude Gauthier : Charles Moreau
- Abeille Gélinas : Moon Shadow
- Patrick Labbé : Olivier
- Gilbert Lachance : Marc-André Dumoulin
- Jean-Marie Lapointe : Nicolas Chaumet
- Lucie Laurier : Caroline Béliveau
- Danielle Leduc : Vanessa Hashley
- Guillaume Lemay-Thivierge : Corneille
- Francine Morand : Jeannine Gervais
- Cédric Noël : Étienne Dumas
- Widemir Normil : Georges Magloire
- Patricia Paquin : Geneviève Lacoste
- Anik Pauzé : Fanny
- Marcia Pilote : Josiane Martineau
- Nathalie Rose : Alexandra Capuano
- Jasmin Roy : Mathias Bélanger
- Caroline St-Onge : Chloé Asselin
- Marie-Jo Thério : Laura Cyr
- Marie-Soleil Tougas : Roxanne
- Christophe Truffert : Arnaud
- Valérie Valois : Annick Senneville
- Stéphane Demers : Denis Lapierre

== Production ==
- Written by Sylvie Payette
- Filmed by Jacques Payette (season 1), Marlène Lemire (seasons 2-7)

== Episodes ==
- Season 1 = (32 Episodes of 20 to 25 minutes)
- Season 2 = (26 Episodes of 40 to 45 minutes)
- Season 3 = (26 Episodes of 40 to 45 minutes)
- Season 4 = (26 Episodes of 40 to 45 minutes)
- Season 5 = (26 Episodes of 40 to 45 minutes)
- Season 6 = (26 Episodes of 40 to 45 minutes)
- Season 7 = (26 Episodes of 40 to 45 minutes)
