= Federico Hidalgo =

Canadian filmmaker

Federico Hidalgo is a filmmaker, film director and film professor in Montreal, Quebec, Canada. He has directed five feature-length, fiction films to date: A Silent Love (2004), Imitation (2006), The Skeptic (L'Incrédule) (2012), Le Concierge (2014) and The Great Traveller (2019), as well as a feature-length documentary, New Tricks (2009). All five of these films were produced by Atopia (film studio).

A Silent Love, co-written with his wife Paulina Robles, was nominated for a Genie Award for best original screenplay and was accepted to the Sundance Film Festival. It also won the Best Screenplay Award at 2004 Brooklyn International Film Festival. Variety wrote that the film "offers a diverting spin on the mail-order-bride premise, making a charming feature debut for writer-director Federico Hidalgo and co-writer Paulina Robles (Hidalgo's wife)."

Hidalgo is both a graduate of and professor at the Concordia University Mel Hoppenheim School of Cinema, as well as a part-time professor in the department of communication studies.
