= Susana Salazar =

Mexican film and television actress

Susana Salazar is a Mexican film and television actress. She is most noted for her performance in the 2004 Canadian film A Silent Love, for which she received a Genie Award nomination for Best Supporting Actress at the 25th Genie Awards and a Vancouver Film Critics Circle nomination for Best Supporting Actress in a Canadian Film.
