= Couzin Films =

Canadian media production company

Couzin Films is a film, television and digital media production company based in Montreal, Quebec, Canada. It was established by Ziad Touma, a Lebanese Canadian film director, producer and screenwriter.

== Filmography ==
- 2003: Saved by the Belles (a.k.a. Échappée belles) directed by Ziad Touma
- 2005: Webdreams (TV series) directed by Ziad Touma
- 2007: Birthday Girl directed by Erin Laing
- 2008: Adam's Wall directed by Michael Mackenzie
- 2023: Evergreen$ (Sapin$)

== See also ==
- Ziad Touma
