= Chop Shop (TV series) =

Canadian docusoap television series

- Genre: Reality; Docusoap
- Created by: Lawrence McDonald; Ziad Touma
- Country of origin: Canada
- Original language: English
- No. of seasons: 1
- No. of episodes: 13

Production
- Executive producers: David Paperny; Cal Shumiatcher; Audrey Mehler; Lawrence McDonald
- Running time: 30 minutes
- Production company: Paperny Films

Original release
- Network: Slice
- Release: February 4 – April 29, 2009

Chop Shop is a Canadian docusoap television series created, directed and produced by Ziad Touma that premiered on February 4, 2009, on the Slice Network. The show follows the stylists at a rock and roll hair salon in Vancouver, British Columbia. The series was produced by Paperny Films.

== Episodes ==
No.	Title	Original release date
1	"Help Wanted"	February 4, 2009
2	"Matchmakers"	February 11, 2009
3	"Powerplay"	February 18, 2009
4	"Break Down"	February 25, 2009
5	"The Competition"	March 4, 2009
6	"Beer, Barbers and Videotape"	March 11, 2009
7	"Family"	March 18, 2009
8	"Fashion Show Follies"	March 25, 2009
9	"Big Changes"	April 1, 2009
10	"Fitting in on the Fringe"	April 8, 2009
11	"Higher Education"	April 15, 2009
12	"The Mohawker"	April 22, 2009
13	"The Franchise"	April 29, 2009
