= Saved by the Belles =

- Theatrical release poster
- Directed by: Ziad Touma
- Written by: Ziad Touma; Brian C. Warren
- Produced by: Ziad Touma; Couzin Films
- Starring: Brian Charbonneau; Karen Simpson; Steven Turpin; Danny Gilmore; Ron Diamond; Lydia Lockett; Tarah Schwartz
- Cinematography: François Dutil
- Edited by: Mathieu Bouchard-Malo
- Music by: Mark Anthony; Brian C. Warren
- Distributed by: Cinema Libre
- Release date: April 24, 2003
- Running time: 90 minutes
- Country: Canada
- Language: English

Saved by the Belles, also known by its French title Échappée belles, is a 2003 feature film by Ziad Touma, his first long feature film. Touma is a Lebanese Canadian film director and producer residing in Montreal, Quebec, Canada. Touma is the founder of Couzin Films film, television and digital media production company and it was released through the company.

In 2023, Telefilm Canada announced that the film was one of 23 titles that will be digitally restored under its new Canadian Cinema Reignited program to preserve classic Canadian films.

== Synopsis ==
The film's story line has a young man rearing his head in Montreal's club milieu, claiming not to remember a thing about his past or who he is. Discovered by local drag diva Sheena Hershey (played by Brian Charbonneau, aka Brian C. Warren) and scene stress Scarlet VJ (played by Karen Simpson), this young amnesiac is soon dubbed "Sean" and taken under wing by the club-junkie duo. Hoping to jar his memory, they take him on a tour of Montreal's club scene, introducing him to various characters along the way; Touma's cast includes numerous authentic night life figures, among them drag fixtures Mado and Madame Simone.

The press kit describes it this way: "Saved by the Belles" stars fags and hags, blonde bimbos, label whores, sugar daddies, club kids, biceps builders, leathers and feathers, funky junkies, freaks and geeks, sex addicts, chupa chicks, lube monsters, pimply pimps, weight watchers, nympho virgins, mingle singles, glow stick ravers, cheap strippers, wannabe actors, guest list leftovers, glittery debutantes, kinky grannies, impotent hustlers, baggy-eyed scenesters, size queen cupids, self-taught porn stars, air miles jet setters, showgirls, smoking players, bendable bisexuals and mama's toys.

== Cast ==
- Brian Charbonneau ... Sheena Hershey (as Brian C. Waren)
- Karen Simpson ... Scarlet
- Steven Turpin ... Chris
- Danny Gilmore ... Sean
- Lydia Lockett ... Magda
- Matt Williston ... Tobey
- Ron Diamond ... Doug
- Marcelle Lapierre ... Edith
- Mado Lamotte ... Mado
- Dennis O'Brien ... Dennis
- Varda Etienne ... Varda
- Terry Sigalas ... Terry
- Louise Bastien ... Loulou
- Robert Horble ... Chicken
- Driss Berki ... Driss
- Paul Pabello ... Paul
- Alessandro Mangiarotti ... Alessandro
- Bernadette Rusgal ... Bernadette
- Nohémie Renaud ... Noémie
- John Thomas Fraser ... Sean's Dad

== Awards and nominations ==
A theatrically distributed feature film, Ziad Touma's Saved by the Belles won several awards in festivals around the world.

The film went on to win the Best Feature Film award at Toronto's Inside Out Film and Video Festival in 2003.

In 2004, it was nominated for three Genie Awards for "Best Achievement in Cinematography", "Best Achievement in Art Direction" and "Best Achievement in Music - Original Song".

== Saved by the Belles website ==
"Belles" film led to the launching of a website by Ziad Touma, co-wrote and co-produced with Mouna Andraos and BlueSponge. The website won the "Boomerang Awards" for "Best Arts & Culture Website" and was nominated as "Best Extreme Entertainment Site" at the South by Southwest SXSW Awards.
