= Gianpaolo Venuta =

Actor

- Born: 30 August 1978 (age 48); Canada
- Other names: Gian Paolo Venuta, Gian-Paolo Venuta
- Occupation: Actor
- Years active: 1999-present

Gianpaolo Venuta (also known as Gian Paolo Venuta or Gian-Paolo Venuta; born 30 August 1978) is a Canadian actor perhaps known best for voicing Jason Brody, the playable protagonist of the 2012 action adventure game Far Cry 3.

== Filmography ==
=== Film ===
- Take-out (2001) as Rory
- Vampire High (2001) as Damon Grismer
- Abandon (2002) as Research Assistant
- The Circle (2002) as Jetson Harlow
- Silent Night (2002) as Chris
- Il Duce canadese (2004) as Mario Alvaro
- Fries with That? (2004) as Tommy Maguire aka Tigerman
- Noel (2004) as Young Guy
- Time Bomb (2006) as Agent Brian Goodman
- Last Exit (2006) as James Moore
- My Claudia (2009) as Matthew (also writer and director)
- Plateau Baby Man (2009) as Kelly
- Let the Game Begin (2010) as Frat Boy
- Score: A Hockey Musical (2010) as Marco
- Joy Ride 3: Roadkill (2014) as Austin

=== Television ===
- Live Through This (2000) as Kyle (2 Episodes)
- Undressed (2002) as Dominick
- Bliss (2003) as Luc Gibson
- Korea: The Unfinished War (2003) as Don Gill
- Petits mythes urbains (2004) as Colleague
- Pure (2005) as Josh
- Naked Josh (2006) as Nick (11 Episodes)
- Like Mother, Like Daughter (2007) as Keith
- The Double Life of Eleanor Kendall (2008) as Barkeep
- Second Chances (2010) as Neil Bray/Phil Sterin
- Blue Bloods (2010) as Jared
- Being Human (2011) as Danny (recurring role)
- The Firm (2012) as Joey Morolto Jr
- Time of Death (2013) as Eliot Larken
- Good Witch (2019) as Vincent (5 episodes)
- Revival (2025) as Professor Aaron Weimer

=== Voiceovers ===
- Station X (2005) as Knob (voice)
- Assassin's Creed II (2009) as Ludovico Orsi (voice)
- Assassin's Creed: Brotherhood (2010) as Fabio Orsini (voice)
- Far Cry 3 (2012) as Jason Brody (voice and mo-cap)
- Far Cry 6 (2021) as Jason Brody (voice and mo-cap)
