= All This Victory =

2019 drama film

- Directed by: Ahmad Ghossein
- Screenplay by: Ahmad Ghossein; Abla Khoury; Syllas Tzoumerkas
- Produced by: Marie-Pierre Macia; Myriam Sassine; Georges Schoucair
- Starring: Karam Ghossein; Flavia Bechara
- Cinematography: Shadi Chaaban
- Edited by: Yannis Chalkiadakis
- Music by: Khyam Allami
- Release date: 2019
- Language: Arabic

All This Victory (Arabic: جدار الصوت, romanized: Jeedar El-Sot, lit. 'Wall of Sound') is a 2019 drama film co-written and directed by Ahmad Ghossein, in his feature debut. A co-production between Lebanon, France and Qatar, it premiered at the 76th Venice International Film Festival, in which it was awarded the Venice's Critics' Week Grand Prize, the Mario Serandrei Award for Best Technical Contribution and the Audience Award.

== Cast ==
- Karam Ghossein as Marwan
- Flavia Bechara as Rana
- Issam Bou Khaled as Mohammad
- Adel Chahine as Kassen
- Elie Choufani as Rana's Brother
- Sahar Minkara as Joumana
