= Dummies Theatre =

1990s theatre group of Montreal, Canada

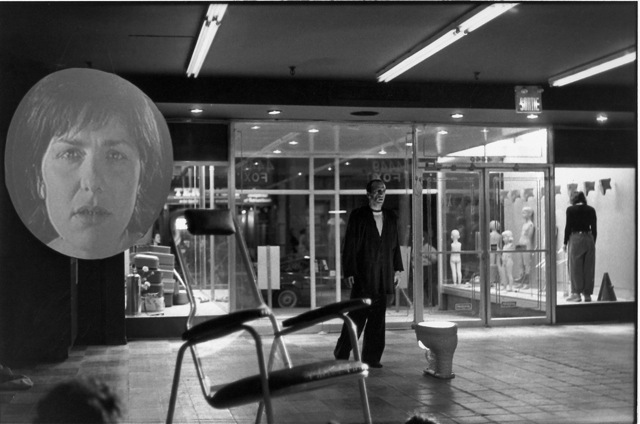
- Carlo Alacchi and Anna Papadakos performing Dummies 95 in a vacant store on boulevard Saint Laurent in April 1995
- Formation: April 1992
- Dissolved: June 2000
- Type: Theatre group
- Purpose: Experimental, Site-specific
- Location: Vacant stores on Boulevard Saint-Laurent, Montreal, Canada
- Members: Anna Papadakos, Carlo Alacchi, Pascal Maeder, Dave Ballard, Daniel Brochu, Patroklos Timamopoulos, Arto Paragamian, James Schidlowsky, Ramon-Luis Perez
- Artistic director: Anna Papadakos

Dummies Theatre was a Canadian experimental and interdisciplinary contemporary theatre company known for creating free site-specific works and daring productions in vacant stores located in Montreal during the 1990s.

== History ==
The group was founded in April, 1992 by actors Anna Papadakos, Carlo Alacchi, filmmaker Pascal Maeder and soundman Dave Ballard for the production of the original play Dummies in the Window. The production took place in the vacant store below Papadakos and Maeder's apartment on Montreal's Boulevard Saint-Laurent. The actors commissioned installation artist Pierre Allard to create a storefront display. While the artist was setting up, a falling dummy shattered the glass window and crashed on the sidewalk, missing Montreal Gazette's reporter Albert Nerenberg by only a few feet. Nerenberg wrote an article titled "Crashing Dummies" about the incident that prompted the group to use the term Dummies for their play title and theatre name. With no money to promote the show and a strong creative intention to build a "street theatre environment" by behaving like "barkers", the actors stood in front of the venue before the performances to lure passersby. The popularity and success of the initial two-week run allowed for an extension of two weeks.

Papadakos, who took on the role of Artistic Director in addition to writing and directing the shows, was motivated by the show's success and a desire to create a "conscious" theatre. She launched a financing drive and caught the attention of Canadian philanthropist, Phyllis Lambert, who saw it as a way to rejuvenate neighborhoods through art. With the assistance of The Samuel and Saidye Bronfman Family Foundation and various other sources, the newly formed theatre company raised enough funds to produce a second play, Return of the Dummies, the following year in a bigger vacant store a few doors up the street. In the fall of 1995, the group completed its trilogy on immigrants with Dummies 95 in yet another empty store on the Boulevard Saint-Laurent. In 1996, the group created Go Weast, the first of three pieces on alienation. As the early 1990s recession was ending in Montreal, empty stores filled with new businesses and the group rented the second floor of a newly moved grocery store (Segal's), which later became the home of Mainline Theatre. Go Weast's success and subject matter along with its stunning dream-like 16mm original footage of visuals of Canada and Canadians attracted the attention of Festival de Théâtre des Amériques's Artistic Director Marie-Hélène Falcon, making Dummies Theatre the first English Theatre company from Québec to be invited to partake in the international event. The play Medea in the Media followed in 1998 and was performed in the same space, which had become the company's permanent home. Theatre Critic Aurèle Parisien described the experimental group's imprint on Montreal's Main at the end of the millennium.

The intriguing black posters appeared along Montreal's Saint-Laurent Boulevard and other key locations in early May. Beside “Dummies Theatre” in small print, the large, luminescent blue-on-black block of type on the top says “Medea in the Media” - an alliteration as seductive as it is confusing, leaving a nagging impression of misreading. A band of haunting black and white images across the middle of the poster has the same effect, seducing while eluding straightforward comprehension: on the left, a misty field with a bit of railway track; on the right, the rippled surface of a sea or lake. The two images bleed into each other in a middle panel where the field, the railway track and the curving side of a moving train become immersed in a film of watery ripples. In the lower part of the poster the same mysterious blue type proclaims “Free Theatre,” providing dates and a nameless Saint-Laurent Boulevard address. Anyone checking the address on the way up the street would discover a door leading into a stairway to the second floor above Segal's Supermarket.

In 2000, the group produced its last creation before disbanding, Dummies in the Mirror. This was an introspective piece that used the lighting technician as a third actor with a wired console providing the only illumination.

== Content, experimentation and form ==
Immigrant identity, culture shock and tensions, relationships with the self and the other, alienation and identity in general were the main themes of the Dummies. The sets, designed by Maeder, were primarily minimalist using surveillance cameras, video and original 16mm black-and-white footage projected through windows or reflected through mirrors, props and found objects.

== Gallery ==
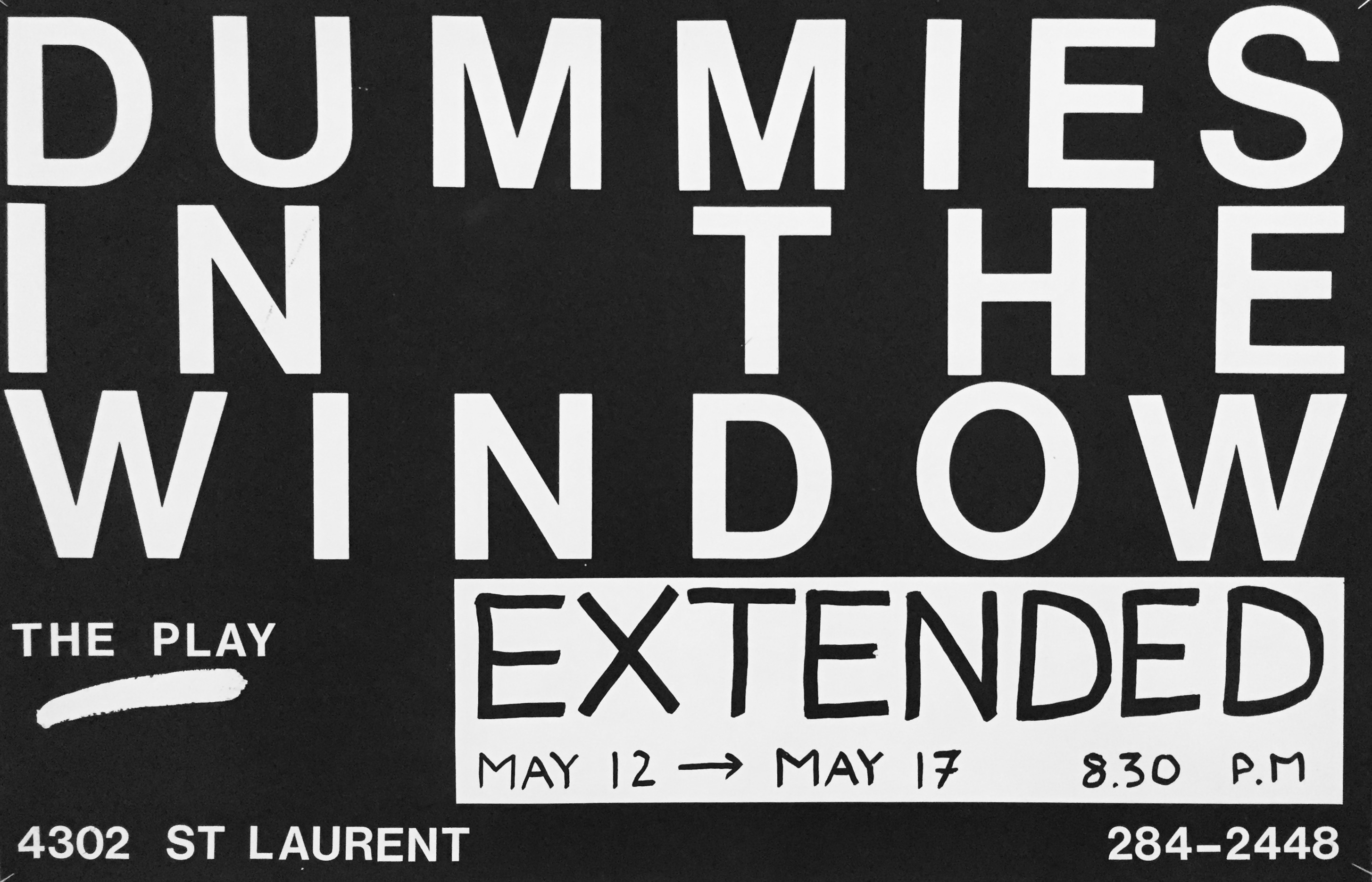
Dummies in the Window, poster, 1992

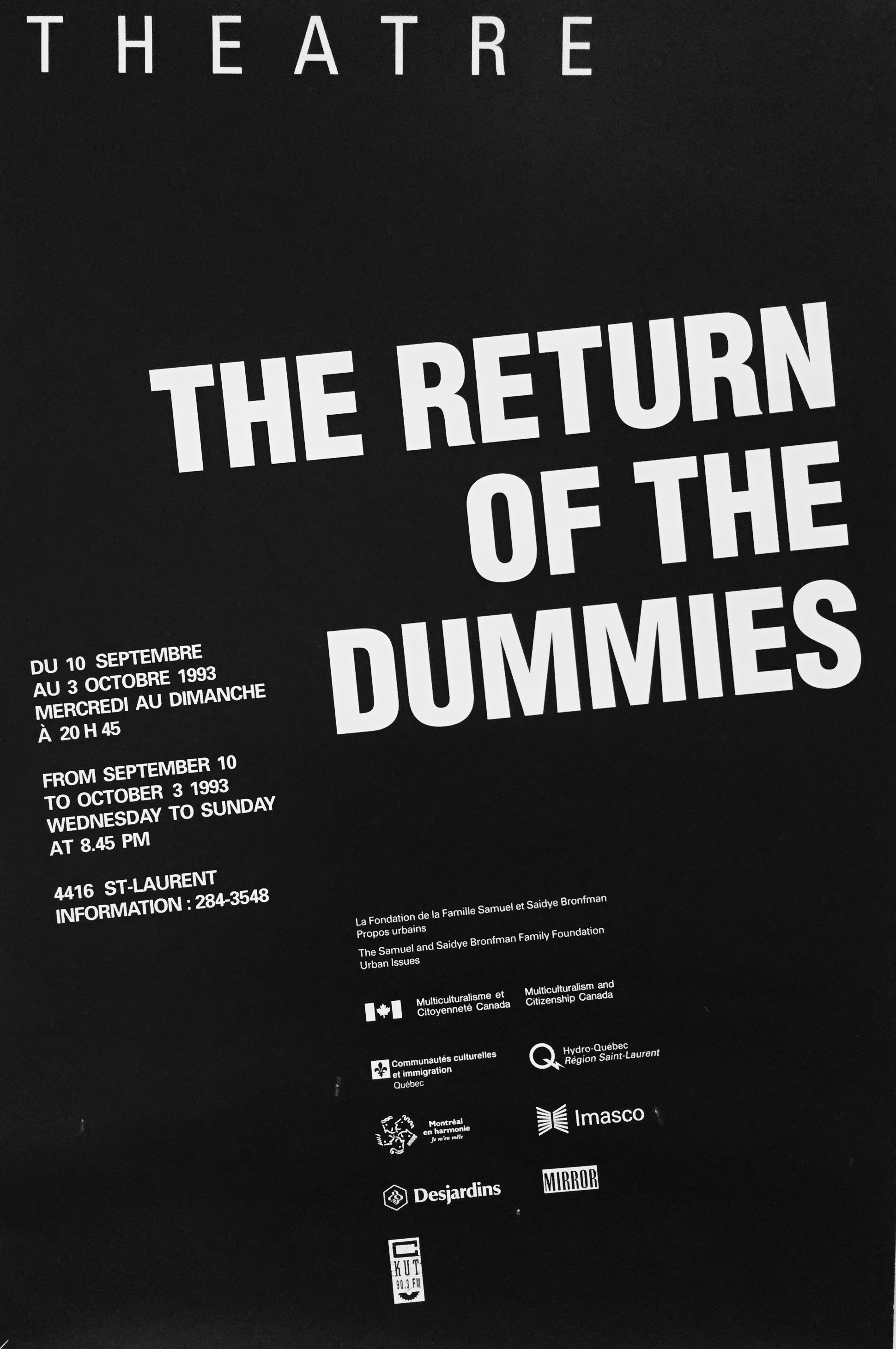
Return of the Dummies, poster, 1993

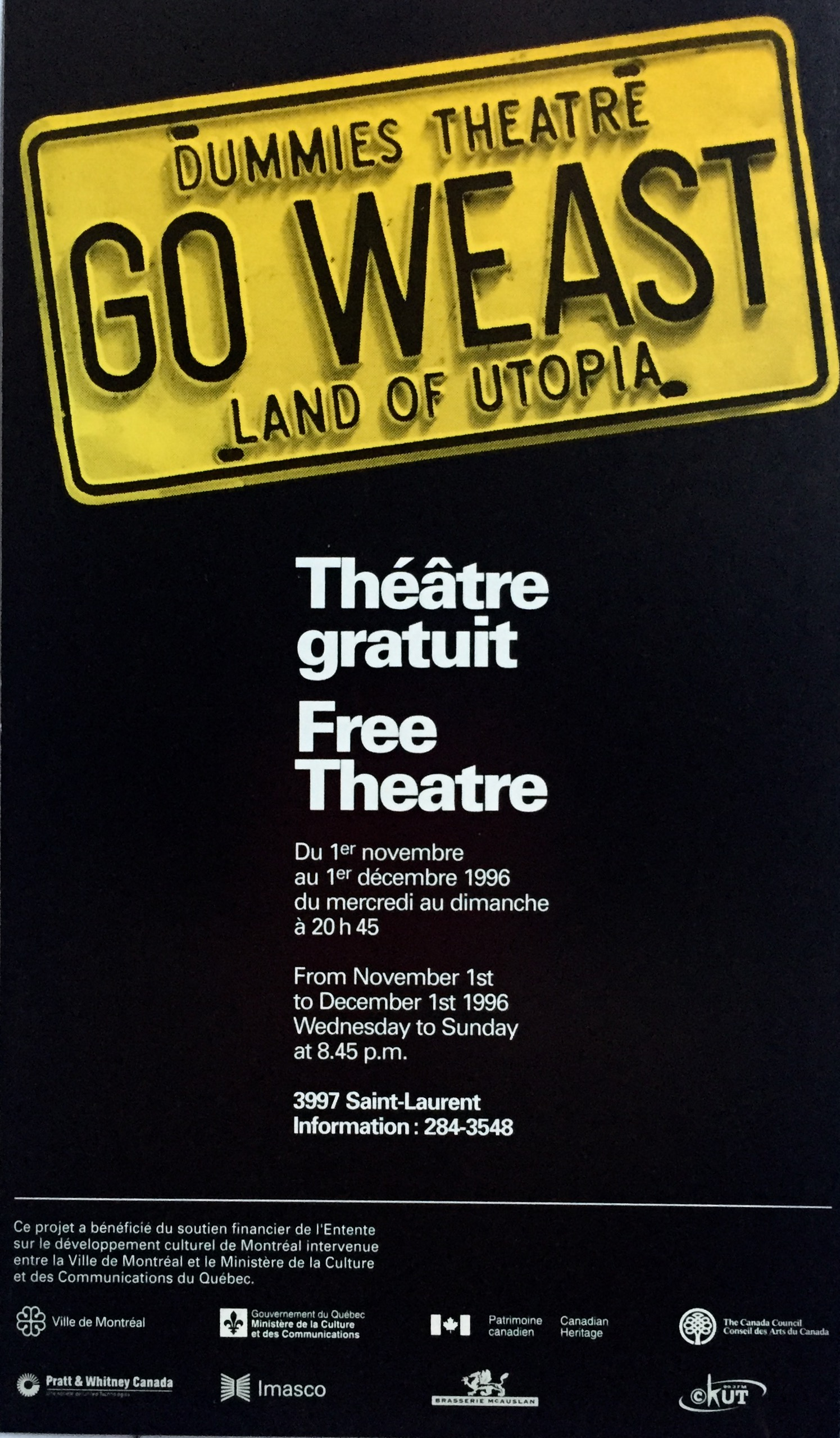
GO WEAST, original Montreal run poster, 1996

== See also ==
- Pop up store
- Transmedia storytelling
- Cybernetic art
- The Wooster Group

== Sources ==
- "Crashing Dummies", The Montreal Gazette, April 1992
- "Medea in the Media: The Theatre of Anna Papadakos and Dummies Theatre," Canadian Theatre Review 97 (Winter 1998): 84-89.
