= Adam's Wall =

- Theatrical release poster
- Directed by: Michael Mackenzie
- Written by: Dana Schoel; Michael Mackenzie
- Produced by: Ziad Touma; Olivier Sirois
- Starring: Jesse Aaron Dwyre; Flavia Bechara; Paul Ahmarani; Gabriel Gascon; Tyrone Benskin; Maxim Roy; Kyler Nesrallah
- Cinematography: François Dutil
- Edited by: Arthur Tarnowski
- Music by: Benoit Charest
- Production company: Couzin Films
- Distributed by: Equinoxe Films
- Release date: October 17, 2008
- Running time: 93 minutes
- Country: Canada
- Language: English

Adam's Wall is a 2008 Canadian drama film directed by Michael Mackenzie, who also co-wrote the film with Dana Schoel and produced by Ziad Touma of Couzin Films and by Olivier Sirois. The film's original music is composed by Benoît Charest. The film was released in Montreal on October 17, 2008.

The film stars Jesse Aaron Dwyre as Adam Levy, Flavia Bechara as Yasmine Gibran, Paul Ahmarani as Najeeb Gibran, Gabriel Gascon as Rabbi Levy, Tyrone Benskin as Mostafa and Maxim Roy as Christine. Younger Adam is played by Kyler Nesrallah.

== Synopsis ==
In Mile End, Montreal, Adam Levy, a Jewish teenager, falls in love with Yasmine Gibran, a Lebanese girl. As Adam heads to music school for an audition, he meets Yasmine, who is participating in a student protest. When the situation escalates, the two are thrown together in the rush to evacuate the school. Despite missing his audition, Adam becomes lovestruck for Yasmine, being drawn to her passionate and exquisite character.

As the couple's relationship grows, complications arise. Adam fears that his orthodox Rabbi grandfather, who he's lived with since his parents were killed in Israel, will stop at nothing to end his relationship with "the Arab girl". The renewed conflict in the Middle East feels closer and closer to home, as Yasmine's life dives into a tailspin when she learns that her mother has gone missing in bombarded Beirut. The young lovers' fight to stay together proves more difficult by the day. The deeper they fall for each other, the more their families feel betrayed.

== Cast ==
- Jesse Aaron Dwyre as Adam Levy
- Flavia Bechara as Yasmine Gibran
- Paul Ahmarani as Najeeb Gibran
- Maxim Roy as Christine
- Gabriel Gascon as Rabbi Levy
- Tyrone Benskin as Mostafa
- Kyler Nesrallah as Young Adam
- Malcolm Travis as Avrum Levy
- Leni Parker as Anita Levy
- Neil Kroetsch as Arab-Israeli Driver
- Patrick Sabongui as Kamal
- Oury Ezerzer as Hassidic Settler
- Stephen Spreekmeester as Hassidic Settler
- Ya'Acov Bauer as Jewish Orthodox Man
- Ferelith Young as Protest Organizer
