= Ziad Touma =

Lebanese-Canadian film director, producer and screenwriter

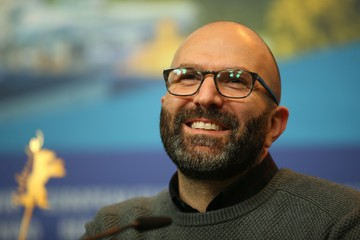
- Ziad Touma
- Occupations: Producer, Director, Writer
- Years active: 1995 - present

Ziad Touma is a Lebanese Canadian film director, producer and screenwriter born in Beirut, Lebanon and residing in Montreal, Quebec, Canada. He is the founder of the film, television and digital media production company Couzin Films .

== Earlier Years ==
Ziad Touma graduated from Concordia University's communications program in 1994. His student film "Dinner at Bubby's" won best Canadian student film at the Montreal International Short Film Festival in 1995.

Before establishing Couzin Films, between 1995 and 2001, he was a director at MusiquePlus and MusiMax, speciality music channels in Montreal and series writer and director at Galafilm.

He also took part in Showcase's Kink and documentaries for the series Made in Montreal for CTV and TV5 and directed a documentary story for MusiMax entitled On s'en va à Granby about new musical talents.

He worked as a freelance journalist, reporting on trends in the local and international urban culture for some of Quebec's top publications such as LaPresse, Voir, ICI, Clin d'œil and Summum magazines. Ziad also penned a social commentary column for over four years in the monthly magazine Nightlife, after which he acted as its creative director.

== Career ==
In 2002, he co-directed "9 à 5: Une folle nuit" with René-Pierre Bélanger. It depicts six people prowling through the darkest recesses of the city, guide us through Montreal's nocturnal urban jungle, uncovering its secrets and codes of behaviour. Diverse in so many ways, these clubbers have one thing in common: a love of night-time and its music.

In 2003, he directed his first long feature movie, the theatrically distributed feature film Saved by the Belles. The film won several awards in festivals around the world win "Best Feature Film" award at Toronto's Inside Out Film and Video Festival in 2003. The following year, in 2004, it was nominated for three Canadian Genie Awards for "Best Achievement in Cinematography", "Best Achievement in Art Direction" and "Best Achievement in Music - Original Song".

Touma was chosen as of the "Noisemakers" of 2001, by Montreal Mirror cultural weekly. Playback magazine chose him as one of their "Top Ten to watch".

He produced a feature documentary entitled "Profession Veejay" for MusiquePlus, the award-winning short film "Birthday Girl" and the feature film Adam's Wall, that began its theatrical run in Fall 2008.

He has also directed television series Webdreams (2005), Chop Shop (2009) and Dussault Inc. (2011)

== Filmography ==
=== Directing ===
- 1994: Dinner at Bubby's (short film)
- 1998: Line-Up (short film)
- 2002: 9 à 5: Une folle nuit co-directed with René-Pierre Bélanger
- 2003: Kink (TV series - 13 episodes)
- 2003: Saved by the Belles (aka Échappée belles) (feature film)
- 2005: Webdreams (TV series)
- 2009: Chop Shop (TV series - 13 episodes)
- 2011: Dussault Inc. (TV series - 16 episodes)
- 2011: Dakar à Bandiagara (TV series)

=== Production ===
- 2003: Saved by the Belles (aka Échappée belles) (producer)
- 2007: Birthday Girl (producer)
- 2008: Adam's Wall (executive producer) (producer)
- 2009: Chop Shop (TV series - 13 episodes) (producer)
- 2010: Incendies (associate producer)
- 2011: Dussault Inc. (TV series - 16 episodes) (executive producer)
- 2015: The Sound of Trees (Le Bruit des arbres)
- 2023: Evergreen$ (Sapin$)
- 2024: The Thawing of Ice (La Fonte des glaces)

=== Screenwriter ===
- 1998: Line-Up
- 2003: Saved by the Belles (aka Échappée belles)
- 2005: Webdreams (TV series)
- 2009: Chop Shop (TV series - 9 episodes) (creator)

=== Documentaries ===
- Made in Montreal docu-series
- 2007: On s'en va à Granby, a docu-roman

== Awards and nominations ==
- In 2003, fis film "Saved by the Belles" won "Best Feature Film" award at Toronto's Inside Out Film and Video Festival.
- In 2004, the same film was nominated for three Canadian Genie Awards for "Best Achievement in Cinematography", "Best Achievement in Art Direction" and "Best Achievement in Music - Original Song".
