= Pure (2005 film) =

- Directed by: Jim Donovan
- Written by: Eugene Garcia
- Produced by: Vito G. Balenzano; Marcel Giroux
- Starring: Laura Jordan; Karen Simpson; Gianpaolo Venuta; Rachelle Lefevre
- Music by: Simon Wayland
- Release date: November 11, 2005
- Country: Canada
- Language: English

Pure is a 2005 Quebec film directed by Jim Donovan, written by Eugene Garcia, and starring Laura Jordan, Karen Simpson, Gianpaolo Venuta and Rachelle Lefevre. This was Jim Donovan's first feature film.

== Plot ==
Misha seeks to escape her party-girl past and enroll in college.

== Cast ==
- Laura Jordan as Misha
- Karen Simpson as Angie
- Gianpaolo Venuta as Josh
- Rachelle Lefevre as Julie
- Tim Rozon as Sam
- Abeille Gélinas as Sabrina

== Release and reception ==
The movie was released on DVD in February 2006.

=== Awards and nominations ===
Jim Donovan was received a 2005 Directors Guild of Canada nomination for Pure. It also received Jury Prize for Best Photography at the 2005 Canadian Film Festival in Toronto.
