= Jaffa Lam =

Chinese visual artist (b. 1973)

Jaffa Lam Laam (Note: Chinese: 林嵐; Jyutping: Lam^{4} Laam^{4}) (born 1973) is a Chinese visual artist. She is known for her mixed-media sculptures and site-specific works that inquire into Hong Kong culture and history. Lam often uses recycled materials such as found fabric or wood from construction sites. She began focusing on community engagement and socially responsible art at the time of the SARS outbreak in Hong Kong in 2003. And since then, she has created many community-driven projects in Hong Kong and abroad. In 2006, she received the Asian Cultural Council's Desiree and Hans Michael Jebsen Fellowship. Her works have been acquired by public institutions, including Hong Kong Museum of Art, Hong Kong Heritage Museum, and Chinese University of Hong Kong. Lam is also known as an educator. She is currently Academic Head at the Hong Kong Art School.

== Early life ==
She was born in 1973 in Fujian, People's Republic of China. She migrated to Hong Kong in 1985 (at 12 years old) and continued her study there. She received a Bachelor of Fine Arts, Master of Fine Arts, and postgraduate diploma in education from The Chinese University of Hong Kong. She sculpted in wood, metals and glass, and created more expansive installations from items such as cough-drop tins, tree branches, and string. Some of her more avant-garde sculptures were object dialogues created at a residency in Hualien, Taiwan in 2003, or the ornate mosquito nets she sewed the following year on a cultural exchange with women in a Kenyan village.

== Selected works ==
Lam's practice focuses on socially engaged art. She stated, "During SARS in 2003, I felt strongly the power of collective sadness and anxiety, and I decided to respond this feeling." Speaking about her projects that involve workers from different industries in Hong Kong, the artist says, "I'm neither a fighter nor a social activist. . . What I do is only raising attention [. . . for] invisible people."

Micro Economy (2009-ongoing) is a community-driven project that involves garment and crate wood workers. The project features large-scale sculptural objects using discarded or recycled materials such as old fabric, leftover crate wood, and scrap metal. It questions the economy shaped around the idea of "use."

Bleaching is another collaborative work, where Lam worked with members of the Hong Kong Women Workers' Association, using pieces of fabric to create surfaces that act as tents and projection surfaces at the same time.

Jaffa Lam Laam Collaborative: Weaver (2013) is a community art project that involves women from grassroots organizations as co-creators of artworks. Hosted at the Hong Kong Arts Centre in 2013, the project includes seventeen works, including wood, fabric and found objects as well as her collaborative work with marginalized skilled laborers in Hong Kong. The project explores the relationship between traditional craft and traditional gender norms, as well as labor and class for women in Hong Kong. This project was shown to represent Hong Kong at the Setouchi Triennale in 2013.

Lam's mixed-media installation work, Rocking in Mini Zen Garden (2020), was part of the disCONNECT HK exhibition of pandemic-related artwork. Lam collected rocks by her home which is near a quarantine camp. The rocks remind her of mountains which she imagines summiting. She traces her path with thread and illuminates it with UV lights. By installing the artwork in a toilet in an historical tenement building, Lam attempts to create a safe space amidst uncertainty during the COVID-19 pandemic.

Christina Yuen Zi Chung, a PhD scholar in Feminist Studies at the Gender, Women, and Sexuality Studies Department of the University of Washington, discusses how Lam creates work with a feminist consciousness and uses her work to reimagine a language for feminism for Hong Kong-based artists.

== Exhibitions ==
Lam's solo exhibitions include Chasing an Elusive Nature, Axel Vervoordt Gallery (2022); Piu3, Shouson Theatre, Hong Kong Arts Centre (2018); Jaffa Lam X Sam Tung Uk, Sam Tung Uk Museum, Hong Kong (2017); Looking for my family story, Lumenvisum Gallery, Hong Kong (2015); Jaffa Lam Laam Collaborative: Weaver, Pao Gallery, Hong Kong Art Centre, Hong Kong (2013); Micro Economy, RMIT School of Art Gallery, Melbourne (2011); Travel with Rickshaw, Alliance Française, Dhaka (2005); and Murmur, Shatin Town Hall, Yuen Long Theatre, Hong Kong (2003).

Her work has been part of numerous group exhibitions, including Rocking in Mini Zen Garden, disCONNECT, Hong Kong (2020); A Beast, A God, and a Line, Para Site, Hong Kong (2018); Fête des Lumières, Lyon (2018); Utopias/Heterotopia: Wuzhen International Contemporary Art Exhibition (2016); Project Across: Touch Wood, K11 Art Space, Hong Kong (2015); Fine Art Asia 2014, Hong Kong Conventional and Exhibition Centre, Hong Kong (2014); The Wind Shifts-Dialogues with Hong Kong Artists, Chi Art Space, Hong Kong (2014); Asia Platform in Setouchi Triennale 2013, Fukuda, Shodoshima (2013); Diverse City 8Q, Singapore Art Museum, Singapore (2012); Blue Wind International Multimedia Art Festival, Yangon (2012); Citizening, Vargas Museum, University of the Philippines, Manila (2012); Dialogue, Liu Hai Su Art Museum, Shanghai (2012); Passing through memory, Suzhou Jinji Lake Art Museum Opening Exhibition, Suzhou (2012); Strolling on the water, Westlake Contemporary Museum, Hangzhou (2011); and Butterfly Effect, He Xian Ning Museum, Shenzhen (2010).

== Recognition ==
Lam received several awards including 40 UNDER 40, Perspective Magazine (2010); Freeman Foundation Asian Artists’ Fellowship (2009); Urban Glass Visiting Artist Fellowship (2007); Asia Cultural Council Fellowship (2006); Award for “Artists in Neighbourhood Scheme II” of Hong Kong Art Promotion Office (2002); International Art Contest, Mixed Media, Hong Kong (1997); Hong Kong Creative Paper Works Competition, Mixed Media (1997); and Y. S. Hui Arts Collection Award, Print Making (1996).
