= Karen Simpson (actress) =

Canadian actress and fashion designer (born 1975)

- Born: November 14, 1975 (age 50); Montreal, Quebec
- Occupations: actress,fashion designer

Karen Simpson (born November 14, 1975) is a Canadian actress and fashion designer.

She was born in Montreal, Quebec. In 1998 she co-founded Ritual Designs, a Canadian corset and fashion company.

In 2003, she starred in Saved by the Belles. In 2004 she appeared in Pure.

She is regularly voted into the Best of Montreal (Montreal Mirror) top 10 lists for "Best Actress". Most recently (2006) she appeared at second place, behind Elisha Cuthbert.

== Filmography ==
- Saved by the Belles as Scarlet
- Pure as Angie

== Television ==
- Naked Josh, guest appearance (2005)
