= Ursula Biemann =

Swiss video artist, curator and art theorist

Ursula Biemann (born 8 September 1955) is a Swiss video artist, curator, educator, and art theorist.

== Biography ==
Born on 8 September 1955 in Zurich, Switzerland. Biemann is a contemporary media artist. She was trained in art in Boston, Mexico and New York, graduating with a Bachelor of Fine Arts at the School of Visual Arts (SVA) in 1986. In 1988 Biemann attended the Whitney Independent Study Program in New York.

From 1995 to 1998 she curated the Shedhalle Zürich; and from 2000 to 2003, she taught at the École Supérieure des Beaux-Arts, Genève. and directed artistic research projects (e.g. 2003-2005 B-Zone Becoming Europe and Beyond, 2005-2007 The Maghreb Connection) at the Institute for Theory at Zurich University of the Arts, ZHdK.

Biemann initiated several curatorial and collaborative research and exhibition projects (e.g. World of Matter produced by Hartware Dortmund, in the collection of HEK Basel)

== Video Essays ==
Biemann's early video art (e.g. 1999 Performing the Border and 2000's Writing Desire) addressed the topics of gender, globalization, technology and Mobility in an essayistic and documentary-like style. Her later work (e.g. 2013 Deep Weather, 2014 Forest Law, 2018 Acoustic Ocean, 2021 Forest Mind) focuses on resources, the ecology, forests, and the climate, and uses a more critical style involving mythical, poetic and science fictional elements.

From 2018 to 2023 Biemann was commissioned new work by the Museo de Arte at the National University of Colombia UNAL, initiating a long-term collaboration with the Indigenous Inga people of Colombia creating an Indigenous University in the rainforest. The cooperation resulted in the media work Devenir Universidad and Forest Mind with a focus on the intelligence in nature and a dialogue between scientific and ancestral knowledge systems.

The UNAL commission also comprised the creation of a multi-media an online monograph Becoming Earth of Biemann's ecological video works from 2012 to 2024.

== Exhibitions ==
Biemann's work contributes to numerous group exhibitions worldwide and has been exhibited in International Art Biennials in 2024 Riyadh, 2023 Venice, 2008 and 2018 Shanghai, 2016 São Paulo, 2018 Taipei, 2016 Shardjah, 2008 Liverpool, 2008 Gwangju, 2009 Bamako, 2007 and 2022 Istanbul, 2014 Montreal.

Selected solo exhibitions

- 2024 at the Museum for Contemporary Art at UNAM Mexico City
- 2024 Freiraum Museumsquartier in Vienna
- 2022 at Museum of Modern and Contemporary Art MAMAC Nice
- 2020 at the Centre culturel suisse Paris
- 2013 in Neuer Berliner Kunstverein n.b.k.
- 2012 Lentos Museum Linz
- 2009 at Nikolaj Contemporary Art in Copenhagen
- 2009 at Helmhaus Zurich
- 2008 in the Bildmuseet Umea in Sweden

Biemann's writing addresses topics such as borders, migration, gender, the ecology, the Anthropocene, human-nonhuman relations and Indigenous knowledge systems, including the ancient trans-Saharan trade routes that are now being used by migrants.

== Bibliography ==
Books by the artist

- Geography and the Politics of Mobility by Generali Foundation, Vienna, published by Walther König, Cologne, 2003
- Stuff It - The Video Essay in the Digital Age, Voldemeer/Springer, 2003
- The Maghreb Connection, Actar Publishers, 2006
- Mission Reports – artistic practice in the field, Ursula Biemann Video Works 1998-2008, published by Bildmuseet Umea and Arnolofini Bristol, distributed by Cornerhouse Publishers.
- Forest Law – Selva juridica, A project by Ursula Biemann and Paulo Tavares on the cosmopolitics of Amazonia. Broad Art Museum, State University of Michigan, 2014
- World of Matter, Sternberg Press, Berlin/New York, 2015
- Forest Mind. On the Interconnection of All Life, Spector Books, Leipzig, 2022

== Awards ==
Her works were first noted in the international media art scene before a first exhibition in Switzerland in 2009. Her works have been exhibited internationally since 1998, and are held by several Fonds d'art contemporain in France and Switzerland, as well as by the Centre national d'art et de culture Georges Pompidou in Rennes, Migros Museum, the Musée d'Art du Valais in Sion, Swiss Federal Art Collection BKS Bundeskunstsammlung, Kunsthaus Zurich, and the Generali Foundation in Vienna. She received the 2009 Prix Meret Oppenheim, a 2008 Honorary Degree by the Swedish University in Umeå, and the 2022 Art Award of the City of Zurich among other awards.
