= Jan Robert Leegte =

Dutch artist (born 1973)

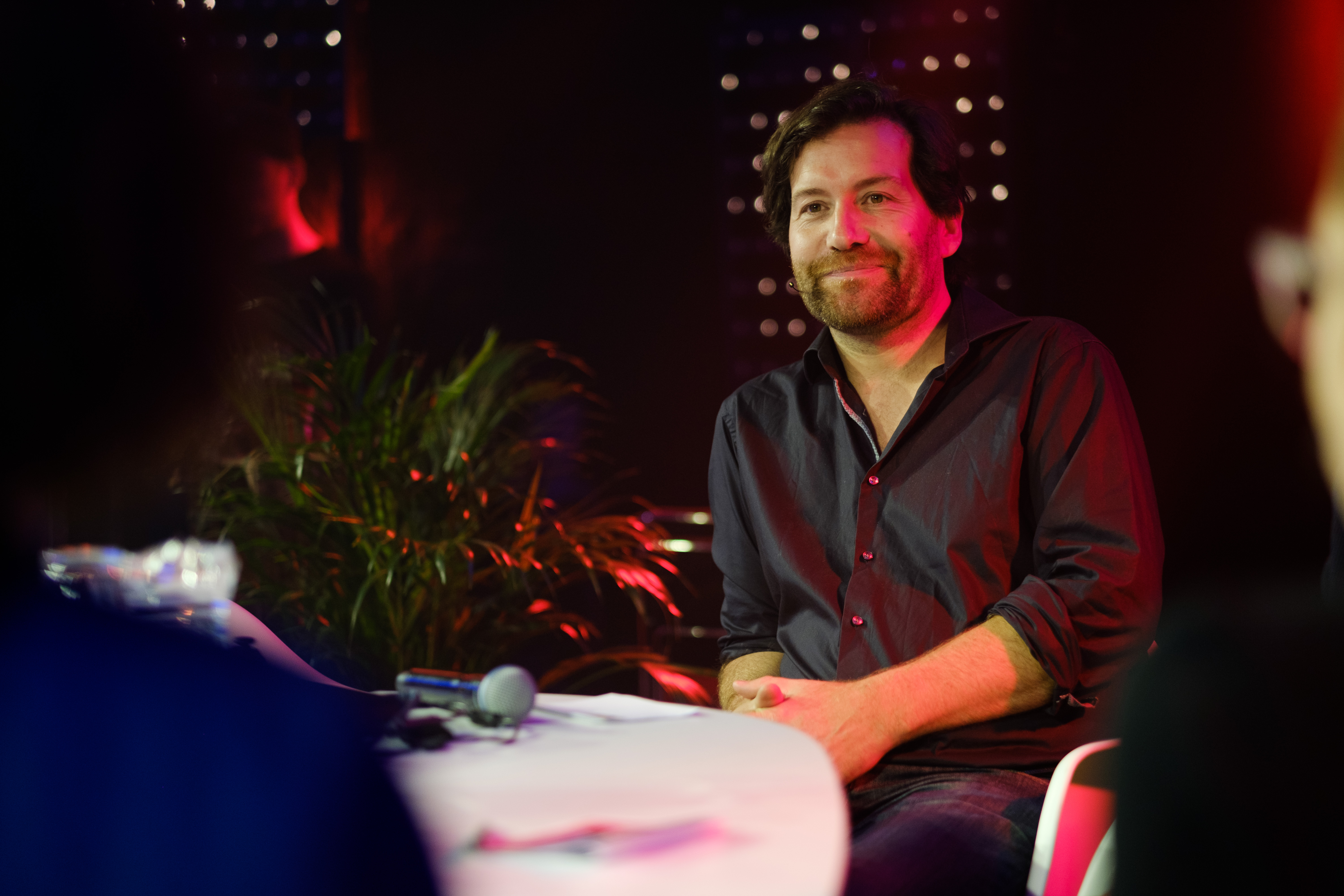
Jan Robert Leegte, 2017

Jan Robert Leegte (born 1973) is a Dutch artist, who lives and works in Amsterdam.

He was one of the first Dutch artists to make art on and for the internet starting in the 1990s. Today, he makes art both on the internet, in the form of websites as in offline media, like prints, sculptures and projections.

A recurring theme in his work is the sculptural materiality of interfaces and computer programs, like the graphic design of cursors, menu and scroll bars.

== Biography ==
Jan Robert Leegte first studied architecture at the Delft University of Technology in Delft, before he switched to the Willem de Kooning Academy in Rotterdam where he studied fine arts and interaction design.

Since 1997, Leegte has made art in the form of websites, that he connects to art historical movements like minimalism, land art and conceptualism. An example is the recreation of Spiral Jetty (1970), a land-art work by the American artist Robert Smithson, that Leegte rebuilt in the platform game Minecraft to explore the online possibilities of land art.

Since 2002, he has translated his online work to offline materials. In his sculptures and projections, he gives a materiality to online phenomena, like scrollbars and selection boxes.

Leegte teaches at the Royal Academy of Art in The Hague and the ArtEZ University of Arts in Arnhem.

== Exhibitions (selection) ==
- Van Gogh Inspires: Jan Robert Leegte – solo exhibition, Van Gogh Museum, Amsterdam (2021)
- Sans objet – online exhibition, Centre Pompidou, Paris (2021)
- Spatial Affairs – exhibition, Museum Ludwig, Cologne (2021)
- Inside | Outside – solo exhibition, Upstream Gallery (2020)
- Sculpting the Internet – solo exhibition, Upstream Gallery (2017)
- On Digital Materiality – online solo exhibition, Carroll / Fletcher (2016)
- '0' Electronic Superhighway – Whitechapel Gallery, London (2016)
- Shifting Optics III – Upstream Gallery, Amsterdam (2016)
- Gym of Obsolete Technology – W139, Amsterdam (2016)
- Expeditie Land Art – Kunsthal KAdE, Amersfoort (2015)
- Sublime Landscapes in Gaming – Rijksmuseum Twenthe, Enschede (2015)
- Born Digital – Museum of the Image, Breda (2014)
