= Hanna Hölling =

Polish-German art historian, theorist

- Born: Hanna Barbara Hölling; 1975 (age 50–51); Zabrze, Katowice Voivodeship, Poland
- Citizenship: Polish-German
- Awards: Senior Fellowship, Collegium Helveticum (ETH Zurich); Terra Foundation Fellowship; Getty Scholarship; Mellon Foundation Fellowship

Academic background
- Education: University of Amsterdam
- Thesis: Re: Paik: on time, changeability and identity: in the conservation of Nam June Paik's multimedia installations (2013)
- Doctoral advisor: D.A. Cherry
- Other advisor: G. Wharton

Academic work
- Discipline: History
- Sub-discipline: Art history
- Main interests: Nam June Paik
- Notable works: Paik’s Virtual Archive; Revisions—Zen for Film
- Website: hannahoelling.com

Hanna B. Hölling is Polish-German art historian, theorist, and researcher whose work explores contemporary art, material studies, and conservation. She is currently a Research Professor and Principal Investigator at the Bern Academy of the Arts in Switzerland. She serves as an Honorary Fellow in the Department of History of Art at University College London (UCL).

Hölling's publications, including Paik’s Virtual Archive and Revisions: Zen for Film, have been the subject of scholarly review in a several of academic journals.

== Early life and education ==
Hölling holds dual Polish-German nationality. She earned her PhD in Art History and Cultural Studies from the University of Amsterdam in 2013. Her doctoral dissertation, Re:Paik: On Time, Changeability and Identity in the Conservation of Nam June Paik’s Multimedia Installations, addressed the conceptual and temporal dimensions of conserving multimedia installations. This work laid the foundation for her later publication, Paik’s Virtual Archive: Time, Change and Materiality in Media Art.

== Career ==
In her early professional years, Hölling served as the Head of Conservation at ZKM Center for Art and Media in Karlsruhe, until 2009.

Between 2013 and 2015, Hölling held a Visiting Professorship at the Bard Graduate Center in New York, supported by the Andrew W. Mellon Foundation as part of the “Cultures of Conservation” initiative. During this period, she developed and curated the interdisciplinary research and exhibition project Revisions—Zen for Film, centered around Nam June Paik's Zen for Film. The project integrated academic teaching, public programming, and publication, culminating in an exhibition (September 2015 – February 2016) and an accompanying book.

From 2016 to 2022, Hölling served as Associate Professor in the Department of History of Art at University College London (UCL). She was later appointed Honorary Associate Professor at UCL, a title she currently holds.

Since 2018, Hölling has been based at the Bern University of the Arts (HKB) in Switzerland, where she presently serves as a Research Professor and Principal Investigator. At HKB Bern, she leads interdisciplinary research projects funded by the Swiss National Science Foundation, including Performance: Conservation, Materiality, Knowledge (2020–2025), Activating Fluxus (2022–2026), Natureculture Lab (2024–2025), and Critical Conservation (2026–2030). These projects investigate themes ranging from the ontology of performance and the conservation of ephemeral art to the intersection of nature and culture in conservation practices. Her work is characterized by cross-disciplinary collaboration and critical approaches to heritage and conservation.

She has served as a supervisor and examiner for doctoral and master's theses across Switzerland, the United Kingdom, and the United States, and as a member of advisory boards and juries internationally. She is a regular contributor to doctoral-level programs, including the Summer Institute for Technical Studies in Art (SITSA) at the Harvard Art Museums.

Hölling has held several fellowships and research affiliations, including a Visiting Scholarship at the Max Planck Institute for the History of Knowledge, a Getty Scholarship at the Getty Conservation Institute in Los Angeles, and a Terra Foundation for American Art Fellowship at the Smithsonian American Art Museum. She was awarded a Senior Fellowship at the Collegium Helveticum, ETH Zurich, for the 2025–2026 academic year and is also a Fellow of the Higher Education Academy in the United Kingdom.

== Exhibitions and curatorial work ==
- Revisions: Zen for Film (Bard Graduate Center, New York, 2015–2016)
- Landscape: Institute for Land and Environmental Art (2020) - Co-edited and co-curated with Johannes M. Hedinger
- Yet to Come: Experiments in Reverse-Engineering and Conserving Performance (Bern University of the Arts, 2024) - Conceived and curated by Hölling as part of the Performance: Conservation, Materiality, Knowledge research project

== Publications ==
=== Sole-authored monographs ===
- Hölling, Hanna B. Paik's Virtual Archive: Time, Change, and Materiality in Media Art. Oakland: University of California Press, 2017.
- Hölling, Hanna B. Revisions—Zen for Film. New York: Bard Graduate Center, distr. by University of Chicago Press, 2015.
- Hölling, Hanna B. Re: Paik—On Time, Changeability and Identity in the Conservation of Nam June Paik's Multimedia Installations. Ph.D. Dissertation. Amsterdam: University of Amsterdam / BOX Press, 2013.

=== Anthologies ===
- Hölling, Hanna B., Aga Wielocha, and Josephine Ellis, eds. Activating Fluxus, Expanding Conservation. London and New York: Routledge, under contract, forthcoming 2026. Open Access and paperback.
- Hölling, Hanna B., Jules Pelta Feldman, and Emilie Magnin, eds. Performance: The Ethics and the Politics of Conservation and Care. Vol. 2. London and New York: Routledge, 2024. Open Access and paperback.
- Hölling, Hanna B., Jules Pelta Feldman, and Emilie Magnin, eds. Performance: The Ethics and the Politics of Conservation and Care. Vol. 1. London and New York: Routledge, 2023. Open Access and paperback.
- Hölling, Hanna B., ed. Object—Event—Performance: Art, Materiality and Continuity since the 1960s. New York: Bard Graduate Center, distr. by University of Chicago Press, 2022.
- Hölling, Hanna B. and Johannes M. Hedinger, eds. Landscape. Berlin and St. Gallen: Vexer Verlag and Institute for Land and Environmental Art, 2020.
- Hölling, Hanna B., Francesca Bewer, and Katharina Ammann, eds. The Explicit Material: Inquiries on the Intersection of Curatorial and Conservation Cultures. Boston and Leiden: Brill, 2019.

=== Journal articles (welection) ===
- Hölling, Hanna B. and Philip Auslander. “Acts and Artefacts.” Arabeschi Rivista di studi su letteratura e visualità, no. 2 (forthcoming June 2025).
- Hölling, Hanna B. and Sven Dupre. “Natureculture Lab: A Reflection.” News in Conservation, International Institute for Conservation of Historic and Artistic Works (May 2025).
- Hölling, Hanna B. “Matter Minding, or What the Work Wants: Aldo Tambellini’s Intermedia.” Afterall 52 (2021). doi:10.1086/719773.
- Hölling, Hanna B. “Caring for Performance: Recent Debates.” CeROArt: Conservation, Exposition, Restauration d'Objets d'Art (December 2021).
- Hölling, Hanna B. “Keeping Time: On Museum, Temporality and Heterotopia.” ArtMatters: International Journal for Technical Art History (2021).
- Hölling, Hanna B. “Unpacking the Score: Fluxus and the Material Legacy of Intermediality.” In On Curating: Fluxus Special Issue, ed. Dorothee Richter and Martin Patrick, 2021.
- Hölling, Hanna B. “Time and Conservation.” ICOM-CC 18th Triennial Conference Preprints, Copenhagen (2017): no pagination.
- Hölling, Hanna B. “Transitional Media: Duration, Recursion, and the Paradigm of Conservation.” Studies in Conservation 61 (2016): 79–83. doi:10.1080/00393630.2016.1181929.
- Translated in Portuguese as: “Mídia transicional: permanência, recursividade e o paradigma da conservação”, in A memória do digital e outras questões das artes e museologia, ed. Pablo Gobira, Belo Horizonte: Editora da Universidade do Estado de Minas Gerais, 2019.
- Hölling, Hanna B. “Seeking the Authentic Moment: De- and Re-Materializations in Paik’s Video and Multimedia Installations.” Journal of the Australian Institute for the Conservation of Cultural Materials 34, no. 1 (2014): 85–92.

=== Selected chapters ===
- Hölling, Hanna B. “Fluxus Mystery Food by Ben Vautier.” In Lexikon der Lebensmittel als Kunstmaterial, edited by Fabiana Senkpiel and Ina Jessen, 90–96. Berlin: Hatje Cantz, 2024.
- Hölling, Hanna B. “Curating et conservation de la variabilité.” Introduction. In Aargauer Kunsthaus – Accompagner l’art contemporain, edited by Katharina Ammann, Simona Ciuccio, Katrin Weilenman, and Bettina Mühlenbach, 162–175. Zürich: Scheidegger & Spiess, 2024.
- — German translation: “Veränderlichkeit kuratieren und konservieren.” Einleitung. In Aargauer Kunsthaus – Mit Gegenwart umgehen, edited by Katharina Ammann, Simona Ciuccio, Katrin Weilenman, and Bettina Mühlenbach, 162–175. Zürich: Scheidegger & Spiess, 2024.
- Hölling, Hanna B., and Rebecca Schneider. “Not, Yet: When Our Art Is in Our Hands.” In Performance: The Ethics and the Politics of Conservation and Care, Vol. 1, edited by Hanna B. Hölling, Jules Pelta Feldman, and Emilie Magnin, 50–69. London: Routledge, 2023. doi.org/10.4324/9781003309987-4.
- — Translated into French in the forthcoming volume Les archives en performances – La performance en archive, edited by Anolga Rodionoff and Ross Louis. Paris: Éditions Hermann.
- Hölling, Hanna B. “Notation and Eternity in Symphonie No. 5 and Liberation Sonata for Fish.” In Nam June Paik: I Expose the Music, edited by Rudolf Frieling, 109–114. Leipzig: Spector Books, 2023.
- — German version: “Notation und Ewigkeit in Symphonie No. 5 and Liberation Sonata for Fish.” Leipzig: Spector Books, 2023.
- Hölling, Hanna B. “Can We Talk Post-Preservation? A Letter to Paik Nam June.” In My Paik Nam June: Memories, Conservation, and the Spread of Discourse, edited by Han Jungin, 83–96. Seoul: National Museum of Modern and Contemporary Art, Korea, 2023.
- Hölling, Hanna B. “The Archival Turn.” In Data Drift: Archiving Media and Data Art in the 21st Century, edited by Rasa Smite, Lev Manovich, and Raitis Smits, 73–89. Riga: RIXC and Liepaja University Art Research Lab, 2015.
- Hölling, Hanna B. “The Aesthetics of Change: On the Relative Durations of the Impermanent.” In Authenticity in Transition: Changing Practices in Contemporary Art Making and Conservation, ed. Erma Hermens and Frances Robertson, 13–24. London: Archetype Publications, 2015.

Several of Hölling's essays have been translated into several languages, including Chinese, Dutch, French, Italian, Korean, Polish, and Portuguese.

== Awards and recognition ==
Hölling has received several fellowships and research grants, including:

- Senior Fellowship, Collegium Helveticum, ETH Zurich
- Terra Foundation for American Art Fellowship, Smithsonian American Art Museum
- Getty Scholarship, Getty Conservation Institute, Los Angeles
- Visiting Scholarship, Max Planck Institute for the History of Knowledge
- Fellowship of the Higher Education Academy (UK)
- Andrew W. Mellon Cultures of Conservation Fellowship, Bard Graduate Center

Her book, Paik’s Virtual Archive, was nominated for an Infinity Award by the International Center of Photography in 2018.
