= Atopia =

Atopia was a production company and film distributor based in Montreal, Quebec, Canada. The company was founded in 2000 by Pascal Maeder. During the following decade, the company produced and released a string of critically acclaimed and award-winning feature films including Daniel Cross' S.P.I.T.: Squeegee Punks in Traffic, Federico Hidalgo's A Silent Love, Simon Sauve's Jimmywork, Noel Mitrani's Sur la trace d'Igor Rizzi, Laura Bari's Antoine Jephté Bastien's Sortie 67 as well as André Forcier's Je me souviens.

Initially launched as an online film studio with the development of 39 episodic web films in 2001, Atopia became the first Canadian distributor to release its feature films online through early platforms such as Jaman.
