= Abeille Gélinas =

Canadian DJ, entertainer and actress

- Born: Abeille Violaine Myriam Éloïse Gélinas; July 12, 1979 (age 47)
- Other names: DJ Abeille, Violaine Gélinas
- Education: Stella Adler Academy of Acting
- Occupations: Disc jockey Entertainer; Actress
- Known for: Weirdsister College
- Spouse: Na'eem Adam m. 2013
- Children: Zayne Adam

Abeille Gélinas, also known as DJ Abeille (born July 12, 1979), is a Canadian DJ, entertainer and actress.

== Biography ==
Born in the province of Quebec, she is the sister of actress and singer Mitsou and the granddaughter of actor Gratien Gélinas.

She studied at the Stella Adler Academy of Acting in Los Angeles. In addition to acting, she has been VJ for the MusiquePlus channel (1996–98) and columnist for the Journal de Montréal, the 24 Hours newspaper and Loulou magazine.

Gélinas married Na'eem Adam on 31 August 2013. She gave birth to their son, Zayne, on 8 June 2015.

In 2022, she and her sisters Mitsou and Noémie published the book Bien-être inspiré - Trouver l'harmonie Corps, Coeur, Esprit, a guide to healthy living. In March 2025, the docureality series Trois sœurs et un chalet premiered on Canal Vie and Crave, in which the sisters renovate the chalet bequeathed to them by their father Alain.

== Filmography ==
| Year | Title | Role | Notes |
|---|---|---|---|
| 1992-1993 | Watatatow | Violaine Godin | TV series (as Violaine Gélinas) |
| 1993 | The Sex of the Stars (Le sexe des étoiles) | Lucky's girlfriend | (as Violaine Gélinas) |
| 1995-1996 | Chambres en ville | Moon Shadow | TV series (as Violaine Gélinas) |
| 1996 | Caboose | Punkette | |
| 2000 | Eyeball Eddie | Cafeteria Girl | |
| 2001-2002 | Weirdsister College | Cas Crowfeather | TV series |
| 2004 | The Last Casino | Volunteer #2 | TV movie |
| 2004 | Baby for Sale | Janka's Roommate | |
| 2005 | Pure | Sabrina | |
| 2007 | The Secret (Si j'étais toi) | Girl with Justin | |
| 2009 | 3 Seasons (3 saisons) | Chantal | |
