= Marcus Maeder =

Swiss artist and scientist (born 1971)

- Born: December 7, 1971; Zurich, Switzerland
- Education: Lucerne University of Applied Sciences, FernUniversität in Hagen, ETH Zurich
- Awards: STARTS Prize Honorary Mention, Stipend Alexander von Humboldt Stiftung
- Scientific career
- Fields: Sound artist, acoustic ecology
- Website: marcusmaeder.ch

Marcus Maeder (born 7 December 1971, Zurich, Switzerland) is a sound artist, acoustic ecologist and composer of electronic music.

== Career ==
Maeder co-runs the music label domizil, which he co-founded in 1996 with Bernd Schurer. Maeder was an editor and producer for the Schweizer Radio und Fernsehen (SRF) and a lecturer and researcher at the Institute for Computer Music and Sound Technology (ICST) at the Zurich University of the Arts. He is professor in the Knowledge To Society degree programme at the Lucerne University of Applied Sciences and Arts Maeder works periodically as a visiting scientist at the Swiss Federal Institute for Forest, Snow and Landscape Research (WSL) since 2016. He was a Humboldt Research Fellow in the Rillig research group of the Institute of Biology at Freie Universität Berlin from 2023 until 2025 and continues his research in Ecoacoustics at FU as a guest scientist.

=== Science ===
In his research at the HSLU and Freie Universität Berlin, Maeder is working on acoustic ecology, ecoacoustics and data sonification of processes and phenomena related to climate change and environmental issues. In these disciplines, Maeder has developed methods of data sonification, field recording, physical acoustics and artistic research that have earned him international recognition. Maeder also reflects on his projects theoretically and philosophically, and has published a number of writings on the topics of art and science, artistic research, as well as sonic relationships in and with the environment.

== Selected exhibitions and projects ==
- 2025: Spreepark Multispezies Bau, Museum Giersch, Frankfurt, Germany
- 2025: Voces de la quebrada/voices of the ravine, Tsonami festival, Valparaiso, Chile
- 2024: Treelab, Denn in den Wäldern sind Dinge, KunstZeugHaus, Rapperswil, Switzerland
- 2024: Growth Model/Forest Voices, Yoshino Art Festival 20, Japan
- 2024: Perimeter Pfynwald V1, Valais Wallis Sound System, Musée d’Art du Valais, Sion
- 2024: Edaphon Toggenburg, Klangweg Toggenburg, Unterwasser
- 2024: Perimeter Pfynwald V2, Horizonte y limite. Visiones del paisaje, Caixa Forum, Barcelona
- 2024: Spreepark Multispezies Bau, Park Einsichten.Vier Positionen aus der künstlerischen Forschung. Spreepark Art Space, Berlin
- 2024: Edaphon Acla, Wälder. Von der Romantik in die Zukunft, Romantikmuseum, Frankfurt
- 2024: Imeall an chosta, Disquiet Frequencies, Goethe Institute, Dublin
- 2023: Growth Model, Tokyo Biennal 2023, Japan
- 2023: treelab, Examples to follow/zur Nachahmnung empfohlen, Uferhallen Berlin
- 2023: Speculative Botany, Art and about. Artistic Research at Spreepark, Spreepark Art Space, Berlin
- 2023: Espirito da floresta, A bruit secret. über das Hören in der Kunst, Museum Tinguely, Basel
- 2022: Edaphon Braggio, Earthbound, HEK Haus der Elektronischen Künste, Basel
- 2022: Acla, Art Safiental, Versam/Tenna
- 2022: Growth Model, Touch Wood, ZAZ Museum Bellerive, Zurich
- 2022: Edaphon Braggio, Earthbound, Esch 2022/Möllerei, Luxembourg
- 2022: Nephoscope, Kunst forscht, Kunstverein Mannheim
- 2021: Silva, Estonian National Museum, Tartu
- 2021: Earth Beats, Kunsthaus Zürich
- 2021: Landliebe, Bündner Kunstmuseum, Chur
- 2020: Critical Zones, Zentrum für Kunst und Medien ZKM, Karlsruhe
- 2019: Perimeter Pfynwald, Eco-Visionaries, Laboral Centro de Arte y Creation Industrial, Gijon
- 2019: treelab, Of plants and People, Deutsches Hygienemuseum, Dresden
- 2018: treelab, Eco-Visionaries, Haus der Elektronischen Künste, Basel
- 2018: Sounding Soil, Zentrum Paul Klee, Bern
- 2018: Espirito da floresta/Forest spirit, Bosque da Sciencia, Manaus
- 2017: Espirito da floresta/Forest spirit, Inter-American Development Bank IDB, Washington DC
- 2017: treelab, Ars Electronica Festival, Linz; BOZAR, Palais des Beaux-Arts, Bruxelles
- 2015: trees: Pinus sylvestris, UN Climate Change Conference COP 21, Paris
- 2014: trees: Pinus sylvestris, SoundReasons Festival, Outset India, New Delhi
- 2014: trees: Downy Oak 2, Baum/Klang/Kunst/Mensch, Alpen Adria Universität Klagenfurt, with Ch. Kubisch, B. Traubeck, W. Ritsch
- 2012: trees: Downy Oak, swissnex San Francisco, Workshop in Muir Woods
- 2011: The left-hand path, A topographical radio play with Jan Schacher/Jasch, Musikprotokoll Graz and Shedhalle Zürich
- 2010: Milieux Sonores, Grey Area Foundation, San Francisco und Kunstraum Walcheturm, Zürich
- 2008: Sonifications and Music for theNova-Light object at Hauptbahnhof Zürich, a project by ETH Zürich
- 2008: Die Wunschmaschinen, Surround radio play after Deleuze/Guattari's Anti-Oedipus, 40 Jahre 1968, Frankfurt und Kunstraum Walcheturm, Zürich
- 2007: Davos Soundscape, a topographic composition with Jan Schacher/Jasch, Davos Festival 2007
- 2004: Transient Travels, Installation and compositions, World New Music Days 2004
- 2003: Electronic Music Archive, an exhibition by Gianni Jetzer and Norbert Möslang (Voice Crack), Kunsthalle St. Gallen
- 2002: Music and sounddesign for Expo.02, Expoagricole, Murten
- 1998: We Are Somewhere Else Already – Swiss Institute, New York

== Discography ==
- 2025: The Contingency Tapes, domizil 52
- 2025: Dissipative Structures, domizil
- 2025: The Tree Temple, domizil n
- 2024: Drifts, Online, domizil 51
- 2020: crepuscule, cassette, domizil 48
- 2017: non-human, CD, domizil 45
- 2015: Progeny, CD, domizil 41
- 2013: topographie sinusoïdale, CD, domizil 38
- 2010: annex, Mini CD, domizil 33
- 2009: Wire Tapper, CD/The Wire(Compilation)
- 2009: subsegmental, CD, domizil 32
- 2008: Opera Calling, CD (Compilation)
- 2008: Die Wunschmaschinen, DVD, domizil 30/ZHdK Records
- 2007: This ship in trouble, CD/online, domizil 24
- 2005: Transient Travels, VA, CD, domizil 23 (Compilation)
- 2004: domizil vs. Antifrost life, - Live CD, domizil 19 (Compilation)
- 2004: Club Transmediale, CD, Data Error (Compilation)
- 2004: La Suisse, CD, SME (Compilation)
- 2003: Bees & Honey, Andrey Kiritchenko, CD, Zeromoon (Remix)
- 2002: Quiconque, CD, domizil 17
- 2001: Poisonhats, CD, Arts Centre Dublin (Compilation)
- 2001: Substrat CD, CD, Stattmusik (Compilation)
- 2000: Institut für Feinmotorik: Verschiedene, CD, IFFM (Compilation)
- 1999: solipsistic_motion, LP, domizil 10

== Bibliography ==
- Marcus Maeder (Hg.): Kunst, Wissenschaft, Natur. Zur Ästhetik und Epistemologie der künstlerisch-wissenschaftlichen Naturbeobachtung. Bielefeld: Transcript Verlag, 2017, ISBN 978-3-8376-3692-5
- Marcus Maeder & Roman Zweifel: trees: Pinus sylvestris, an artistic-scientific observation system at the COP 21. Zurich: domizil; ISBN 978-3-033-05381-6
- Marcus Maeder (Hg.): Milieux Sonores - Klangliche Milieus. Klang, Raum und Virtualität. Bielefeld: Transcript Verlag, 2010; ISBN 978-3-8376-1313-1
- Bruno Spoerri (Hg.): Musik aus dem Nichts. Die Geschichte der Elektroakustischen Musik in der Schweiz. Zürich: Chronos Verlag, 2010, ISBN 978-3-0340-1038-2
