= Michael Mackenzie (filmmaker) =

Canadian director

Michael Mackenzie works in film, theatre and technology policy. He has directed two feature films, both theatrically released in Canada. His plays have been staged in Europe and North America and variously published in English, French, German and Hungarian. He has a Ph.D from L’Institut d'Histoire et Sociopolitique de Science, Université de Montréal. Past academic appointments include Visiting Fellow at Princeton University Professor of Humanities at Vanier College, and consultant at the United Nations.

== Theatre ==
Since 1990 Mackenzie's plays have been produced in Germany, Hungary, the Czech Republic, France, Portugal, Spain, England, Nova Scotia, across Quebec, and in Toronto and Vancouver. His recent play on the 2008 financial crisis "Instructions to Any Future Government Wishing to Abolish Christmas" was a finalist for the 4th International STAGE Competition, the French production toured through twenty-five theatres in Quebec (2015-2016) and played at the National Arts Centre of Canada (Ottawa). The Portuguese translation, produced by A Companhia de Teatro do Algarve, toured fourteen theatres through Portugal and Spain (Spanish sur-titles)

He has directed for the professional theatre in Ottawa, Toronto, Montreal and New York City.

He has worked with Robert Lepage's ex machina company on a number of projects, starting as dramaturge for 'Elseneur' in 1997 and most recently on the English translation/adaptation of Lepage's 'Dragon Bleu'. Mackenzie was dramaturge/consultant on three Cirque du Soleil shows including Ka, currently playing at the MGM Grand in Las Vegas.

== Film ==
Mackenzie's first feature film as a writer/director was The Baroness and the Pig, an adaptation of his play, and was produced by Media Principia. It was selected for the Toronto International Film Festival (2002), Festival du Nouveau Cinema (Montreal 2002) where it was the closing film, Sundance Film Festival (2003) and San Francisco Film Festival (2003). It starred Patricia Clarkson and Colm Feore and was nominated for "Best Direction", "Best Cinematography" and "Best Editing" for the Quebec Jutra Awards (2003). It was theatrically released in Canada in 2003.

His second feature film as director was Adam's Wall. Co-written with Dana Schoel, it was produced by Couzin Films. It premiered at the Festival du Nouveau Cinema (2008) and went on to a number of international festivals including Zlin IFF (Czech Rep.) 2009, Stony Brooke IFF (U.S.) 2009, Skip City IFF (Japan) 2009, Troia IFF, (Portugal) 2009. It was theatrically released in Canada in 2008.

The screenplay for Le Polygraphe 1996, directed by Robert Lepage and which Mackenzie co-wrote/adapted with Robert Lepage and Marie Brassard, was nominated for a Genie Award for best adapted screenplay.

== Technology Policy ==
Mackenzie's scholarly publications on technology policy and related topics include papers (a number co-written with Peter Keating and Alberto Cambrosio) in scholarly journals and a book with the late Jorge Sabato. His article on an economics for the anthropocene with Leonard Nakamura was recently published in The Los Angeles Review of Books

=== Theatre. ===
==== Directing ====
- 1987 - 'Member of the Wedding', Tarragon Theatre, Toronto
- 1992 - 'Last Temptation of Christopher Robin' written by Michael O'Brien, Toronto Theatre Center.
- 1993 - Baroness and the Pig, Workshop, National Centre for the Arts, Atelier, Ottawa.
- 1993 - 'Archeology of a Mother Tongue' (virtual reality installation) co-creation/direction with Toni Dove at Banff Virtual Reality Seminar, Alberta.
- 1994 - 'Tip or Die' written/performed by Linda Mancini, Here, New York
- 1994 - 'Freaks, the Musical' written by Michael O'Brien, Workshop, National Centre for the Arts, Atelier, Ottawa
- 1995 - 'Dark Practice Scarring', interactive installation as author and director at the 6th International Symposium on Electronic Art, Montreal.
- 1997 - 'Bikini', written/performed by Linda Mancini, Vineyard Theatre, New York.
- 2017 - 'Vic and Flo' adapted from the film by Denis Côté. Centaur Theatre, Montreal, Talisman Theatre production.

==== Published plays ====
- 1993: 'Geometry in Venice', Playwrights Union of Canada
- 1995: 'Le précepteur' (transl. 'Geometry in Venice') éditions Herbes rouge.
- 1997: Baroness and the Pig, first publication at éditions Herbes rouges
- 1992 (Adapted from Alex Gelman) We the Undersigned, first publication The Dramatic Publishing Co., (U.S.A.& U.K.)

=== Filmography ===
==== Director ====
- 2002: The Baroness and the Pig
- 2008: Adam's Wall

==== Script/Story ====
- 1996: Le Polygraphe co-written with Robert Lepage and Marie Brassard; a film by Robert Lepage (Genie Award nominee for best adapted screenplay).
- 2002: The Baroness and the Pig (adapted from play of the same name).
- 2008: Adam's Wall co-written with Dana Schoel.
- 2018: Ten Minute Call (short), script.
- 2019: Multiverse, story by (script by Doug Taylor).

==== Technology policy ====
Book, Monographs, Reports and Articles: (selected) scholarly/peer-review only.

- Technology and Responsibility to Future Generations; An Historical Perspective. Ottawa, A.E.C.B., 1978.(33pp)
- "Technology and the Productive Structure", (co-author). Interciencia, Vol.5, #1. Feb.'8O and
- "Technology and the Productive Structure", (co-author) Commercio Exterior, Mexico City, 1979.
- "Policy Considerations in Alternative Technology", in Technological Forecasting and Social Change, (co-author), Vol. 17, Fall, 198O. p329-338
- "Développement technologique et dépenses militaire", dans Bulletin de L'Association Economie Politique, Vol. 5, # 3, Dec. 1984.
- "Technology and Crisis; Marx, Schumpeter and Beyond", in Technology and History, Vol.1, #3. 1985, p249-275.
- "Motivation and Future Generations", in Environmental Ethics, Vol.7, Spring 1985, p63-69.
- "Conceptualising the Science/Industry Interface: Monoclonal Antibody to Diagnostic Kit", (co-author)in Research Policy, Vol.17, Spring 1988, p155-170.
- "Scientific Practice in the Courtroom" (co-author), for Social Problems Vol.37, #3, 1990, p275-293.
- "Patents and Free Scientific information in Biotechnology; Territorializing Monoclonal Antibodies" (co-author) in Science Technology and Human Values, Vol.15, #1, Jan. 1990.
- "Standards, Models and Measures: The Case of Antibody Affinity" (co-author) for The Right Tools for the Job; Materials, Techniques, and Work Organization in 2Oth Century Life Sciences (Ed. A.Clarke and J.Fujimura), Princeton University Press 1993.

=== Nominations ===
- 2010 Finalist, STAGE International (U of Cal.) competition for ‘Instructions to Any Future Gvmt…’
- 2008 Best English Production L’Association québécoise des critiques de théâtre (AQCT) and
- 2008 Best English Production Montreal English Critics Circle Awards ‘The Baroness and the Pig’
- 2003 Nomination Jutra Award for Best Direction for ‘The Baroness and the Pig’ (film)
- 1996 With Robert Lepage, Marie Brassard, Genie Award for best Adapted Screenplay ‘Polygraphe’
- 1990 Nomination Chalmers Award for ‘Geometry In Venice’ (theatre).
