= Webdreams =

Television series

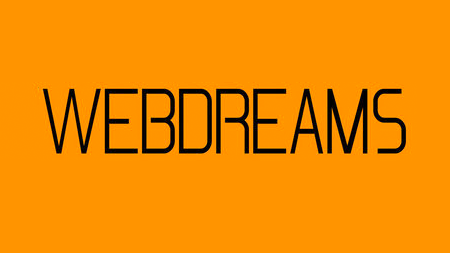
- Written by: Ziad Touma; Gregory Fine; Josh Dorsey
- Directed by: Ziad Touma; Joshua Dorsey; Paul Kell; Christie Callan-Jones
- Narrated by: Adrian Burhop
- Opening theme: Ram
- Country of origin: Canada
- Original languages: English, French
- No. of episodes: 30

Production
- Executive producer: Arnie Gelbart
- Producers: Arnie Gelbart; Michael Kronish; Gregory Fine
- Camera setup: Single camera
- Running time: 30 minutes

Original release
- Network: Showcase, IFC
- Release: September 2, 2005 – November 7, 2008

Webdreams is Canadian documentary series that originally aired on Showcase and IFC from 2005 to 2008. Each season of the series followed a rotating cast of individuals who work in the internet pornography industry.

== Overview ==
Webdreams was produced by the Montreal-based production company Galafilm. The series was directed by Ziad Touma, Joshua Dorsey, Paul Kell, and Christie Callan-Jones, with Touma, Dorsey, and Gregory Fine as writers, and Arnie Gelbart, Michael Kronish, Gregory Fine as producers. The series originally aired on Showcase as part of the network's "Fridays Without Borders" programming block, which featured adult-themed television programming.

=== Season 1 ===
The eight-episode first season of Webdreams filmed from January to November 2004, and premiered on September 2, 2005. Filmed primarily in Montreal, the season focuses on the following individuals:

- Dave Angelo, a bisexual performer in gay pornographic films for Colt Studios
- Dugmor, a web designer and pornography producer
- Katrina, a pornographic film actress and host of the web reality series Pornstar Académie 2
- Laurelle, a webcam model for 2much
- Malezia, an emerging pornographic film actress and Dugmor's protégé

=== Season 2 ===
The second season of Webdreams premiered on April 7, 2007, and consisted of twelve episodes. Edited from 800 hours of footage, the season was filmed in Canada, Amsterdam, Paris, Miami, New York City, Las Vegas, Los Angeles, and Panama City, and focused on the following individuals:

- Angelique, a pornographic actress
- Diesel, a webcam model
- Lance and Alexandra, married pornographic performers
- Uncle D, a pornography producer known as "the Canadian Assman"
- Vid Vicious, founder of the Montreal-based pornography website MSM Crew
- Violet Manson, an alt porn model

=== Season 3 ===
The third season of Webdreams premiered on September 5, 2008, and consisted of ten episodes. The season was filmed in Toronto, Montreal, Newfoundland, New York, Los Angeles, Las Vegas, Miami, Buenos Aires and the Dominican Republic, and was edited from over 600 hours of footage. The season focused on the following individuals:

- Chad and Chris, founders of the Los Angeles-based gay pornography website Jet Set Men
- Jordan, a pornography producer
- Maxine X, a Toronto-based fetish pornography actress
- Paris, a webcam model
- Seven, a pornography producer
- Tommy Pistol, a pornographic film actor

== Reception ==
In 2006, Webdreams was nominated for a Gemini Award for Best Direction in a Documentary Series.
