= Pascal Maeder =

Canadian film producer

Pascal Maeder is a Swiss-Canadian film producer and cyberneticist.

In 2020, he founded Urbanoid, a technology company through which he led the research and development of location intelligence systems, in collaboration with Concordia University in Canada and EPFL in Switzerland, for applications including space-time messaging, random urban tourism, and proximity shopping.

Maeder had previously founded Atopia, a film production company through which he produced and released several feature films including S.P.I.T.: Squeegee Punks In Traffic (2001), A Silent Love (2004) and Je me souviens (2009).

Maeder studied film production at Concordia University in the late 1980s before co-founding Dummies Theatre, an experimental and interdisciplinary theatre company known for creating free site-specific works in vacant stores in Montreal during the 1990s.
