= Mbow =

Mbow is a Senegalese surname. Notable people with the surname include:

- Abdou Mbow (born 1976), Senegalese politician
- Amadou Mbow (born 1993), Senegalese actor
- Amadou-Mahtar M'Bow (1921-2024), Senegalese civil servant
- Anta Mbow (born 1951), Senegalese community activist
- El Hadj Sethe Mbow (born 1985), Senegalese hurdler
- Marcus Mbow (born 2003), American football offensive tackle
- Moustapha Mbow (born 2000), Senegalese football centre-back for Paris FC
- Pape M'Bow (born 1988), Senegalese footballer centre-back
- Penda Mbow (born 1955), Senegalese historian, activist and politician

== See also ==
- Mbowe (disambiguation)
