= 12th Asia Pacific Screen Awards =

- Date: 29 November 2018
- Site: Brisbane Conventions and Exhibition Centre, Brisbane; Australia

Highlights
- Most nominations: Shoplifters (3)

The 12th Asia Pacific Screen Awards were held on 29 November 2018 in Brisbane, Australia.

== Winners and nominees ==
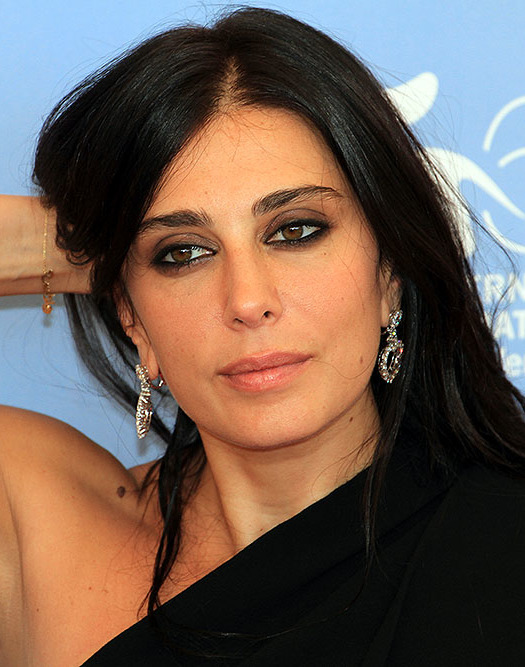
Nadine Labaki won for Achievement in Directing for Capharnaüm.

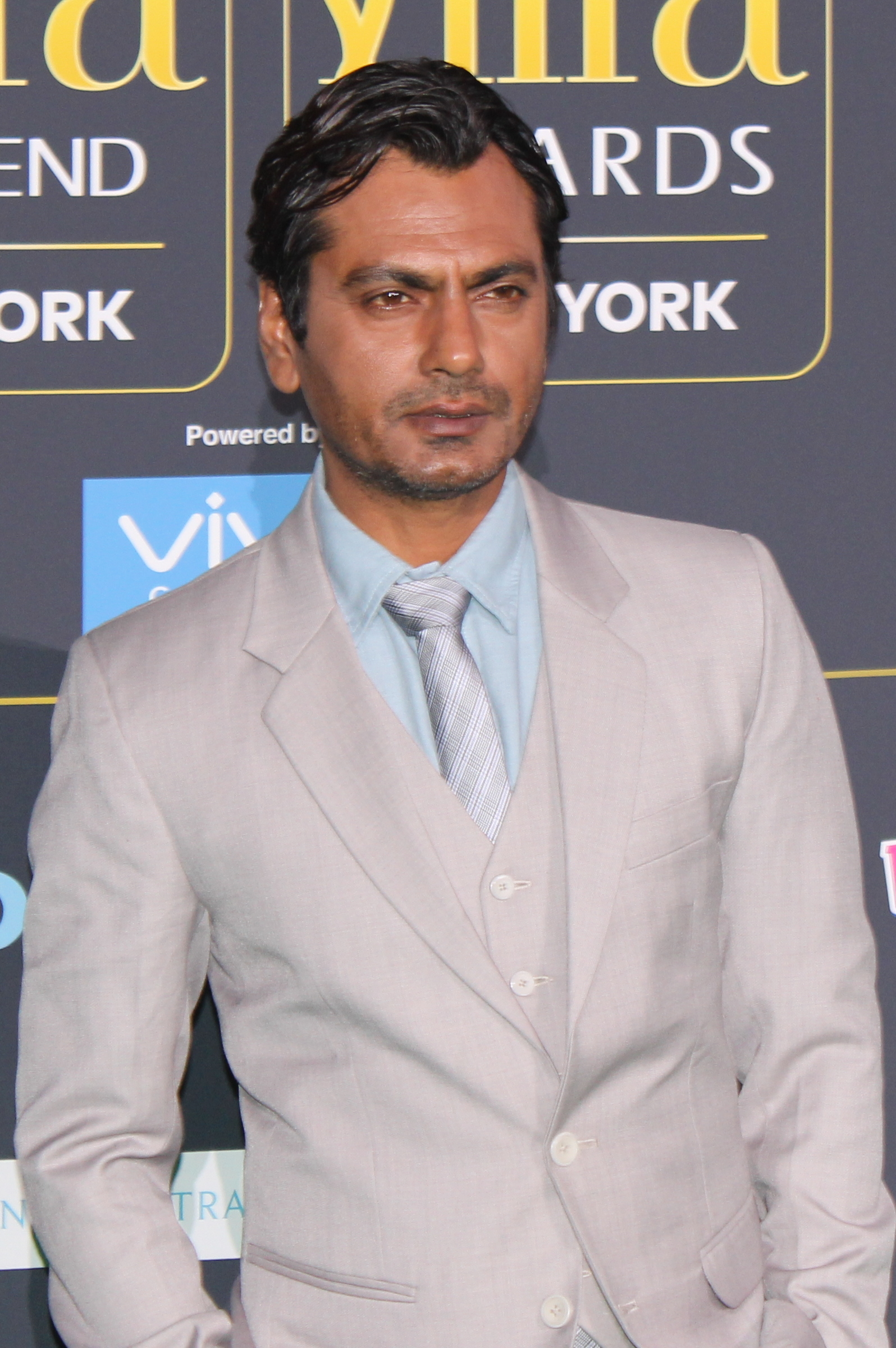
Nawazuddin Siddiqui won Best Actor for Manto.

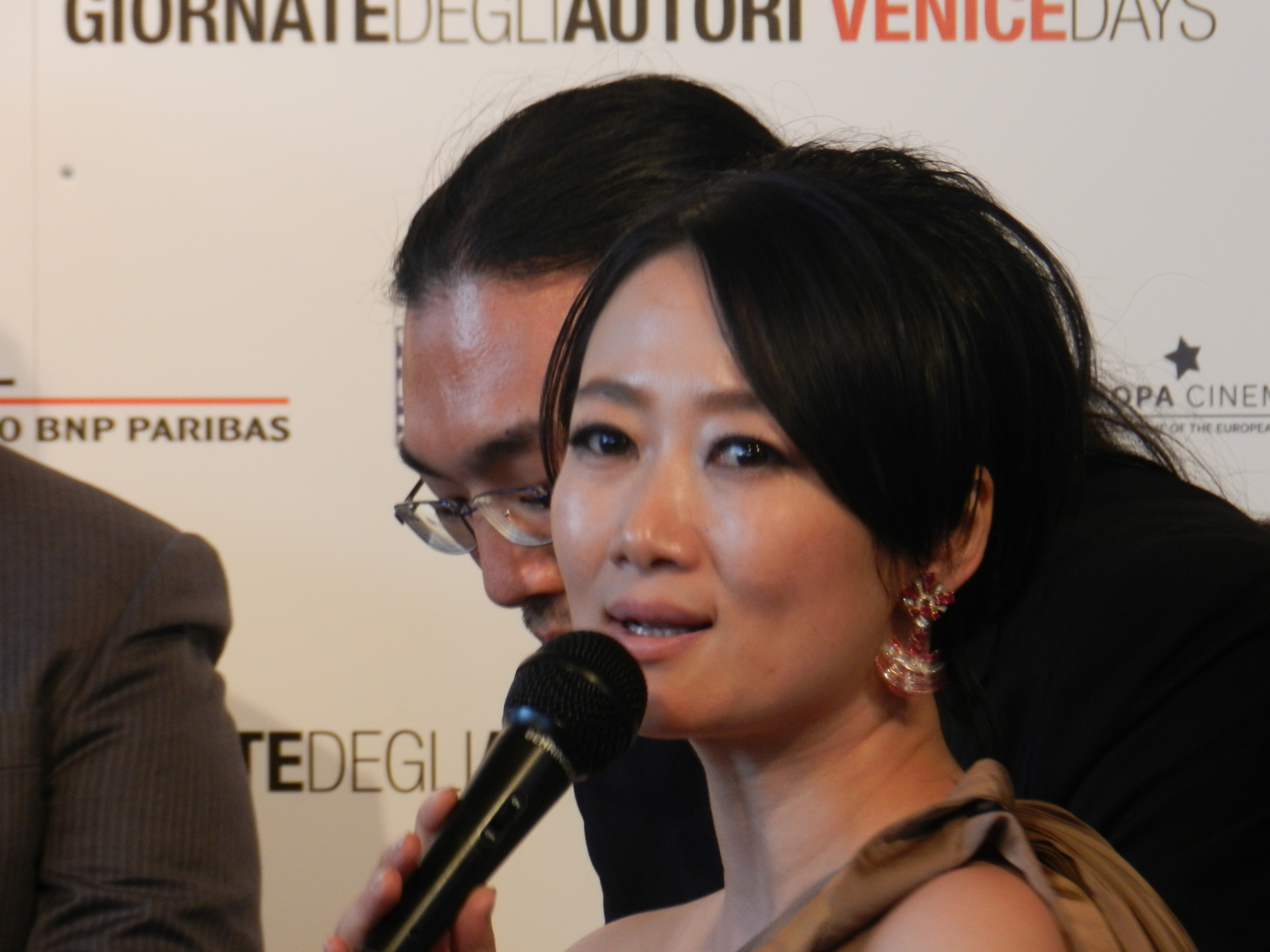
Zhao Tao won Best Actress for Ash Is Purest White.

Nominees and winners were:

Best Feature Film	Jury Grand Prize
(Japan) Shoplifters: (Philippines) Balangiga: Howling Wilderness; (Korea) Burning; (Thailand) (China) (France) Manta Ray; (Kazakhstan) (France) The Gentle Indifference of the World	(Korea) Burning
Achievement in Directing	Best Screenplay
(Lebanon) Nadine Labaki – Capharnaüm: (India) Ivan Ayr – Soni; (Japan) Hirokazu Kore-eda – Shoplifters; (Australia) Bruce Beresford – Ladies in Black; (Kazakhstan) Emir Baigazin – The River	(Israel) Dan Kleinman and Sameh Zoabi – Tel Aviv on Fire: (Korea) Lee Chang-dong and Oh Jung-mi – Burning; (Japan) Hirokazu Kore-eda – Shoplifters; (Kazakhstan) Adilkhan Yerzhanov and Roelof Jan Minneboo – The Gentle Indifference of the World; (Iran) Payman Maadi – Bomb, a Love Story
Best Actor	Best Actress
(India) Nawazuddin Siddiqui – Manto: (Uzbekistan) Karim Mirkhadiyev – Fortitude; (Lebanon) Zain Al Rafeea – Capharnaüm; (Iran) Bahman Farmanara – Tale of the Sea; (Kyrgyzstan) Akylbek Abdykalykov – Night Accident	(China) Zhao Tao – Ash Is Purest White: (United States) Rooney Mara – Mary Magdalene; (Turkey) Damla Sönmez – Sibel; (Kazakhstan) Samal Yeslyamova – Ayka; (Kazakhstan) Laura Koroleva – Sveta
Achievement in Cinematography	Best Youth Feature Film
(Singapore) Hideho Urata – A Land Imagined: (India) Saumyananda Sahi – Balekempa; (China) Zhang Miaoyan and Xu Zhiyong – Silent Mist; (Thailand) Chaiyapruek Chalermpornpanit – Malila: The Farewell Flower; (Thailand) Nawarophaat Rungphiboonsophit – Manta Ray	(Turkey) The Pigeon: (Iran) (Canada) Ava; (Philippines) Nervous Translation; (Japan) (Myanmar) Passage of Life; (India) Village Rockstars
UNESCO Award	Best Animated Feature Film
(Indonesia) Memories of My Body: (China) Ala Changso; (Philippines) Balangiga: Howling Wilderness; (Russia) The Lord Eagle; (China) The Taste of Rice Flower	(Russia) Rezo: (Russia) Hoffmaniada; (Japan) Maquia: When the Promised Flower Blooms; (Japan) Mirai; (Taiwan) On Happiness Road
Best Documentary Feature Film	Best Original Score
(Australia) Gurrumul: (Egypt) (Lebanon) Amal; (Syria) (Lebanon) Of Fathers and Sons; (Japan) (United Kingdom) (France) Of Love & Law; (India) Up Down & Sideways	(Iceland) Hildur Gudnadottir and Johann Johannsson – Mary Magdalene
