= Critics' Choice Movie Award for Best Foreign Language Film =

Award given by the Critics Choice Association

Critics' Choice Award for Best Foreign Language Film
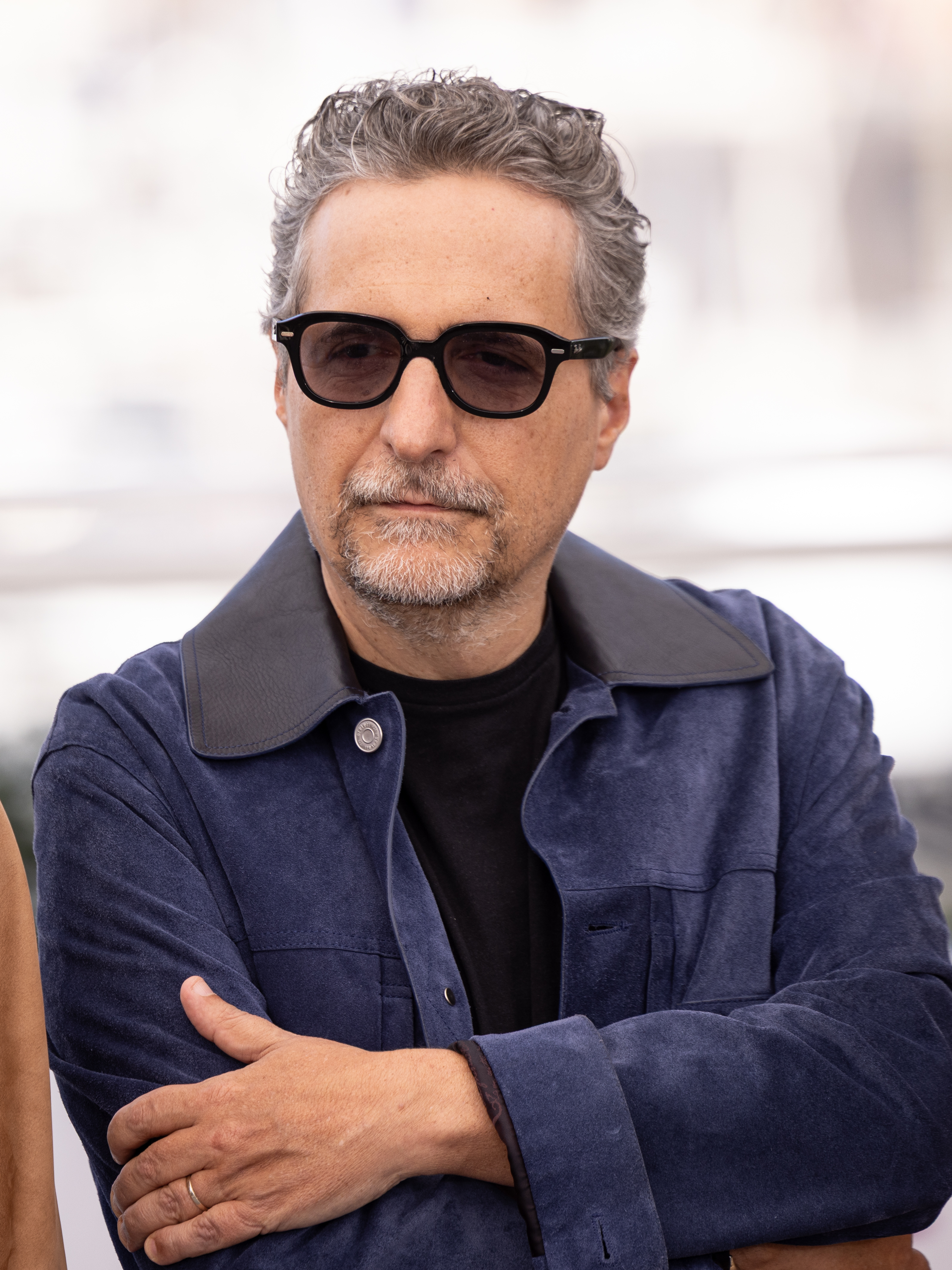
- 2025 recipient: Kleber Mendonça Filho
- Awarded for: Excellence in International Film with a predominantly non-English dialogue track
- Location: Los Angeles, California
- Presented by: Critics Choice Association
- First award: Il Postino: The Postman (1995)
- Currently held by: The Secret Agent (2025)
- Website: www.criticschoice.com

The Critics' Choice Movie Award for Best Foreign Language Film is one of the awards given to people working in the motion picture industry by the Critics Choice Association.

== List of winners and nominees ==
=== 1990s ===
Year	English title	Original title	Director	Country
1995 1st	Il Postino: The Postman	Il postino	Michael Radford	Italy
1996 2nd	Ridicule		Patrice Leconte	France
1997 3rd	Shall We Dance?	ダンス	Masayuki Suo	Japan
1998 4th	Life Is Beautiful	La vita è bella	Roberto Benigni	Italy
1999 5th	All About My Mother	Todo sobre mi madre	Pedro Almodóvar	Spain

=== 2000s ===
Year	English title	Original title	Director	Country
2000 6th	Crouching Tiger, Hidden Dragon	卧虎藏龍	Ang Lee	Taiwan
2001 7th	Amélie	Le fabuleux destin d'Amélie Poulain	Jean-Pierre Jeunet	France
2001 7th	In the Mood for Love	花樣年華	Wong Kar-wai	Hong Kong
2001 7th	No Man's Land	Ničija zemlja	Danis Tanović	Bosnia and Herzegovina
2002 8th	And Your Mother Too	Y Tu Mamá También	Alfonso Cuarón	Mexico
2002 8th	Monsoon Wedding		Mira Nair	India
2002 8th	Talk to Her	Hable con ella	Pedro Almodóvar	Spain
2003 9th	The Barbarian Invasions	Les Invasions barbares	Denys Arcand	Canada
2003 9th	City of God	Cidade de Deus	Fernando Meirelles	Brazil
2003 9th	Swimming Pool		François Ozon	France
2004 10th	The Sea Inside	Mar adentro	Alejandro Amenábar	Spain
2004 10th	House of Flying Daggers	十面埋伏	Zhang Yimou	China
2004 10th	Maria Full of Grace	María llena eres de gracia	Joshua Marston	Colombia
2004 10th	The Motorcycle Diaries	Diarios de motocicleta	Walter Salles	Argentina
2004 10th	A Very Long Engagement	Un long dimanche de fiançailles	Jean-Pierre Jeunet	France
2005 11th	Kung Fu Hustle	功夫	Stephen Chow	Hong Kong
2005 11th	2046		Wong Kar-wai	Hong Kong
2005 11th	Hidden	Caché	Michael Haneke	France
2005 11th	Oldboy	올드보이	Park Chan-wook	South Korea
2005 11th	Paradise Now	الجنّة الآن	Hany Abu-Assad	Palestine / France / Germany / Israel / Netherlands
2006 12th	Letters from Iwo Jima	硫黄島からの手紙	Clint Eastwood	USA
2006 12th	Apocalypto		Mel Gibson	USA
2006 12th	Days of Glory	بلديون	Rachid Bouchareb	France
2006 12th	Pan's Labyrinth	El laberinto del fauno	Guillermo del Toro	Spain
2006 12th	Volver		Pedro Almodóvar	Spain
2006 12th	Water	वाटर	Deepa Mehta	Canada
2007 13th	The Diving Bell and the Butterfly	Le Scaphandre et le Papillon	Julian Schnabel	France
2007 13th	4 Months, 3 Weeks and 2 Days	4 luni, 3 săptămâni şi 2 zile	Cristian Mungiu	Romania
2007 13th	La Vie en Rose	La Môme	Olivier Dahan	France
2007 13th	Lust, Caution	色，戒	Ang Lee	Hong Kong
2007 13th	The Orphanage	El orfanato	Juan Antonio Bayona	Spain
2008 14th	Waltz with Bashir	ואלס עם באשיר	Ari Folman	Israel
2008 14th	A Christmas Tale	Un conte de Noël	Arnaud Desplechin	France
2008 14th	Gomorrah	Gomorra	Matteo Garrone	Italy
2008 14th	I've Loved You So Long	Il y a longtemps que je t'aime	Philippe Claudel	France
2008 14th	Let the Right One In	Låt den rätte komma in	Tomas Alfredson	Sweden
2008 14th	Mongol	Монгол	Sergei Bodrov	Kazakhstan
2009 15th	Broken Embraces	Los abrazos rotos	Pedro Almodóvar	Spain
2009 15th	Coco Before Chanel	Coco avant Chanel	Anne Fontaine	France
2009 15th	Red Cliff	赤壁	John Woo	China
2009 15th	Sin Nombre		Cary Joji Fukunaga	Mexico / USA
2009 15th	The White Ribbon	Das weiße Band – Eine deutsche Kindergeschichte	Michael Haneke	Germany

=== 2010s ===
Year	English title	Original title	Director	Country
2010 16th	The Girl with the Dragon Tattoo	Män som hatar kvinnor	Niels Arden Oplev	Sweden
2010 16th	I Am Love	Io sono l'amore	Luca Guadagnino	Italy
2010 16th	Biutiful		Alejandro González Iñárritu	Mexico / Spain
2011 17th	A Separation	جدایی نادر از سیمین	Asghar Farhadi	Iran
2011 17th	In Darkness	W ciemności	Agnieszka Holland	Poland
2011 17th	Le Havre		Aki Kaurismäki	Finland
2011 17th	The Skin I Live In	La piel que habito	Pedro Almodóvar	Spain
2011 17th	Where Do We Go Now?	وهلأ لوين	Nadine Labaki	Lebanon
2012 18th	Amour		Michael Haneke	Austria / France / Germany
2012 18th	The Intouchables	Intouchables	Éric Toledano and Olivier Nakache	France
2012 18th	A Royal Affair	En kongelig affære	Nikolaj Arcel	Denmark
2012 18th	Rust and Bone	De rouille et d'os	Jacques Audiard	France
2013 19th	Blue Is the Warmest Colour	La Vie d'Adèle – Chapitres 1 & 2	Abdellatif Kechiche	France
2013 19th	The Great Beauty	La grande bellezza	Paolo Sorrentino	Italy
2013 19th	The Hunt	Jagten	Thomas Vinterberg	Denmark
2013 19th	The Past	Le passé / گذشته	Asghar Farhadi	France / Italy / Iran
2013 19th	Wadjda	وجدة	Haifaa al-Mansour	Germany / Saudi Arabia
2014 20th	Force Majeure	Turist	Ruben Östlund	Sweden
2014 20th	Ida		Paweł Pawlikowski	Denmark / France / Poland / UK
2014 20th	Leviathan	Левиафан	Andrey Zvyagintsev	Russia
2014 20th	Two Days, One Night	Deux jours, une nuit	Luc and Jean-Pierre Dardenne	Belgium / France / Italy
2014 20th	Wild Tales	Relatos salvajes	Damián Szifron	Argentina / Spain
2015 21st	Son of Saul	Saul fia	László Nemes	Hungary
2015 21st	The Assassin	刺客聶隱娘	Hou Hsiao-hsien	Taiwan
2015 21st	Goodnight Mommy	Ich seh, Ich seh	Veronika Franz and Severin Fiala	Austria
2015 21st	Mustang		Deniz Gamze Ergüven	France
2015 21st	The Second Mother	Que Horas Ela Volta?	Anna Muylaert	Brazil
2016 22nd	Elle		Paul Verhoeven	France
2016 22nd	The Handmaiden	아가씨	Park Chan-wook	South Korea
2016 22nd	Julieta		Pedro Almodóvar	Spain
2016 22nd	Neruda		Pablo Larraín	Chile
2016 22nd	The Salesman	فروشنده	Asghar Farhadi	Iran
2016 22nd	Toni Erdmann		Maren Ade	Germany
2017 23rd	In the Fade	Aus dem Nichts	Fatih Akin	Germany
2017 23rd	BPM (Beats per Minute)	120 battements par minute	Robin Campillo	France
2017 23rd	A Fantastic Woman	Una mujer fantástica	Sebastián Lelio	Chile
2017 23rd	First They Killed My Father	មុនដំបូងខ្មែរក្រហមសម្លាប់ប៉ារបស់ខ្	Angelina Jolie	Cambodia
2017 23rd	The Square		Ruben Östlund	Sweden
2017 23rd	Thelma		Joachim Trier	Norway
2018 24th	Roma		Alfonso Cuarón	Mexico
2018 24th	Burning	버닝	Lee Chang-dong	South Korea
2018 24th	Capernaum	کفرناحوم	Nadine Labaki	Lebanon
2018 24th	Cold War	Zimna wojna	Paweł Pawlikowski	Poland
2018 24th	Shoplifters	万引き家族	Hirokazu Kore-eda	Japan
2019 25th	Parasite	기생충	Bong Joon-ho	South Korea
2019 25th	Atlantics	Atlantique	Mati Diop	Belgium / France / Senegal
2019 25th	Pain and Glory	Dolor y gloria	Pedro Almodóvar	Spain
2019 25th	Les Misérables		Ladj Ly	France
2019 25th	Portrait of a Lady on Fire	Portrait de la jeune fille en feu	Céline Sciamma	France

=== 2020s ===
Year	English title	Original title	Director	Country
2020 26th	Minari		Lee Isaac Chung	USA
2020 26th	Another Round	Druk	Thomas Vinterberg	Denmark
2020 26th	Collective	Colectiv	Alexander Nanau	Romania
2020 26th	La Llorona		Jayro Bustamante	Guatemala
2020 26th	The Life Ahead	La vita davanti a sé	Edoardo Ponti	Italy
2020 26th	Two of Us	Deux	Filippo Meneghetti	France
2021 27th	Drive My Car	ドライブ・マイ・カー	Ryusuke Hamaguchi	Japan
2021 27th	Flee	Flugt	Jonas Poher Rasmussen	Denmark
2021 27th	The Hand of God	È stata la mano di Dio	Paolo Sorrentino	Italy
2021 27th	A Hero	قهرمان	Asghar Farhadi	Iran
2021 27th	The Worst Person in the World	Verdens verste menneske	Joachim Trier	Norway
2022 28th	RRR		S. S. Rajamouli	India
2022 28th	All Quiet on the Western Front	Im Westen nichts Neues	Edward Berger	Germany
2022 28th	Argentina, 1985		Santiago Mitre	Argentina
2022 28th	Bardo, False Chronicle of a Handful of Truths	Bardo, falsa crónica de unas cuantas verdades	Alejandro González Iñárritu	Mexico
2022 28th	Close		Lukas Dhont	Belgium
2022 28th	Decision to Leave	헤어질 결심	Park Chan-wook	South Korea
2023 29th	Anatomy of a Fall	Anatomie d'une chute	Justine Triet	France
2023 29th	Godzilla Minus One	ゴジラ-1.0	Takashi Yamazaki	Japan
2023 29th	Perfect Days		Wim Wenders	Japan
2023 29th	Society of the Snow	La sociedad de la nieve	J. A. Bayona	Spain
2023 29th	The Taste of Things	La Passion de Dodin Bouffant	Trần Anh Hùng	France
2023 29th	The Zone of Interest		Jonathan Glazer	United Kingdom
2024 30th	Emilia Pérez		Jacques Audiard	France
2024 30th	All We Imagine as Light	പ്രഭയായ് നിനച്ചതെല്ലാം	Payal Kapadia	India
2024 30th	Flow	Straume	Gints Zilbalodis	Latvia
2024 30th	I'm Still Here	Ainda Estou Aqui	Walter Salles	Brazil
2024 30th	Kneecap		Rich Peppiatt	Ireland
2024 30th	The Seed of the Sacred Fig	دانه‌ی انجیر معابد	Mohammad Rasoulof	Germany
2025 31st	The Secret Agent	O Agente Secreto	Kleber Mendonça Filho	Brazil
2025 31st	Belén		Dolores Fonzi	Argentina
2025 31st	It Was Just an Accident	یک تصادف ساده	Jafar Panahi	Iran / France
2025 31st	Left-Handed Girl	左撇子女孩	Shih-Ching Tsou	Taiwan
2025 31st	No Other Choice	어쩔수가없다	Park Chan-wook	South Korea
2025 31st	Sirāt		Oliver Laxe	Spain

== Multiple winners ==
Only 2 directors have won the award multiple times.

Wins	Director
2	(Spain) Pedro Almodóvar
2	(Mexico) Alfonso Cuarón

== Countries with multiple wins (3 or more) ==
Wins	Country	Films
8	France	Ridicule, Amélie, The Diving Bell and the Butterfly, Amour, Blue Is the Warmest Colour, Elle, Anatomy of a Fall and Emilia Pérez
3	Spain	All About My Mother, The Sea Inside and Broken Embraces
