= After Shave (disambiguation) =

Aftershave describes a lotion, gel, balm, powder, or liquid used mainly by men after they have finished shaving.

After Shave may also refer to:

- After Shave (film), a 2005 Lebanese film
- Galenskaparna och After Shave, the name of two Swedish comedy groups, Galenskaparna and After Shave, from Gothenburg
