= Taybeh, Baalbek =

Taybeh (طيبة (بعلبك))
- Village
- Location in Lebanon
- Coordinates: 33°57′29″N 36°10′01″E
- Country: Lebanon
- Governorate: Baalbek-Hermel Governorate
- District: Baalbek District
- Elevation: 3,580 ft (1,090 m)
- Time zone: UTC+2 (EET)
  - Summer (DST): +3

Taybeh (Arabic: طيبة (بعلبك), romanized: Ṭaybeh (Baʿlabakk)) is a village in the Baalbek District in Baalbek-Hermel Governorate.

== History ==
In 1838, Eli Smith noted el-Taiyibeh as a village in the Baalbek area, whose inhabitants were Catholic.

== In popular culture ==
The 2011 Lebanese film Where Do We Go Now? directed by Nadine Labaki was partly shot in the village because it features a church next to a mosque, as in the plot of the movie.

== Bibliography ==
- Robinson, E.; Smith, E. (1841). Biblical Researches in Palestine, Mount Sinai and Arabia Petraea: A Journal of Travels in the year 1838. Vol. 3. Boston: Crocker & Brewster.
