= Laure Gardette =

French film editor (born 1969)

- Born: 1969 (age 55–56)
- Occupation: Film editor

Laure Gardette (born 1969) is a French film editor. Gardette was born in Lentigny. She has edited such films as Polisse (for which she won a César Award), In the House and Young & Beautiful.

== Filmography ==
Year	Title	Director	Notes
1999	Un peu de retenue !	Sylvain Gillet	Short
1999	L'âme-soeur	Olivier Chrétien	Short
2001	Sombres espoirs	Boris Vial	Short
2002	Georges chez les tops	Olivier Chrétien (2)	Short
2002	Et si on parlait d'amour...	Daniel Karlin	Documentary
2003	L'enfance de Catherine	Anne Baudry	Short
2004	I'm an actrice	Maïwenn	Short
2005	Sous mon lit	Jihane Chouaib	Short
2006	Pardonnez-moi	Maïwenn (2)	
2006	My Last Minute	Leos Carax	Short
2007	Caramel	Nadine Labaki	
2009	Le bal des actrices	Maïwenn (3)	
2009	La dame de trèfle	Jérôme Bonnell	
2010	Potiche	François Ozon	
2010	Empreintes	Charles Castella	Documentary
2011	Polisse	Maïwenn (4)	César Award for Best Editing
2011	Bouton d'or	Boris Vial (2)	Short
2012	In the House	François Ozon (2)	
2012	Populaire	Régis Roinsard	
2013	Young & Beautiful	François Ozon (3)	
2014	Paris Follies	Marc Fitoussi	
2014	The New Girlfriend	François Ozon (4)	
2015	Bête noire	Stéphanie Carreras & Philippe Pujo	Short
2016	Pattaya	Franck Gastambide	
2016	Frantz	François Ozon (5)	Nominated - César Award for Best Editing
2017	Patients	Grand Corps Malade & Mehdi Idir	
2017	L'Amant double	François Ozon (6)	
2018	The Prayer	Cédric Kahn	
2018	Capernaum	Nadine Labaki	
2019	By the Grace of God	François Ozon (7)	
2020	Summer of 85	François Ozon (8)	
2021	Everything Went Fine	François Ozon (9)	Post-production
