= Rio, I Love You =

2014 anthology film by 10 different directors

- Theatrical release poster
- Directed by: Stephan Elliott; Fernando Meirelles; José Padilha; Paolo Sorrentino; Andrucha Waddington; Vicente Amorim; Guillermo Arriaga; Im Sang-soo; Nadine Labaki; Carlos Saldanha; John Turturro
- Music by: Pedro Bromfman; Khaled Mouzanar
- Production companies: Warner Bros. Pictures; Conspiração Filmes
- Distributed by: Warner Bros. Pictures
- Release date: 2014
- Running time: 110 minutes
- Country: Brazil
- Language: Portuguese

Rio, I Love You (Portuguese: Rio, Eu Te Amo) is a 2014 Brazilian anthology film starring an ensemble cast of actors of various nationalities. It's the fourth film in the Cities of Love franchise (following 2006's Paris, je t'aime, the 2008 film New York, I Love You, and Tbilisi, I Love You released earlier in 2014), created and produced by Emmanuel Benbihy.

== Production ==
The participating directors were Brazilians Carlos Saldanha (Ice Age and Rio), José Padilha (Elite Squad), Andrucha Waddington (The House of Sand) and Fernando Meirelles (City of God), the Lebanese director Nadine Labaki (Caramel), the Mexican screenwriter Guillermo Arriaga (Babel), the Australian director Stephan Elliott (The Adventures of Priscilla, Queen of the Desert), the Italian director Paolo Sorrentino (The Great Beauty), the American actor and director John Turturro, and the South Korean director Im Sang-soo (A Good Lawyer's Wife, The Housemaid).

The opening and closing sequences, plus the transitions were directed by Brazilian Vicente Amorim, while musician Gilberto Gil composed the theme song.

Those responsible for producing the film, among them Rio Filme, disclosed that the cost of production was R$20 million.

== Segments ==
Segment	Director	Writer	Actors
Dona Fulana	Andrucha Waddington (Brazil)	Andrucha Waddington, Mauricio Zacharias	Fernanda Montenegro, Regina Case, Stepan Nercessian, Hugo Carvana, Eduardo Sterblitch, Sandro Rocha
La Fortuna ("The Luck")	Paolo Sorrentino (Italy)	Paolo Sorrentino	Emily Mortimer, Basil Hoffman
A Musa ("The Muse")	Fernando Meirelles (Brazil)	Antonio Prata, Chico Mattoso	Vincent Cassel, Débora Nascimento
Acho que Estou Apaixonado ("I think I'm in love")	Stephan Elliott (Australia)	Stephan Elliott	Ryan Kwanten, Marcelo Serrado
Quando não há Mais Amor ("When there is no more love")	John Turturro (United States)	John Turturro	John Turturro, Vanessa Paradis, Camila Pitanga
Texas	Guillermo Arriaga (Mexico)	Guillermo Arriaga	Jason Isaacs, Laura Neiva, Land Vieira, Henrique Pires, Bruna Linzmeyer
O Vampiro do Rio ("The River's Vampire")	Im Sang-soo (South Korea)	Im Sang-soo	Roberta Rodrigues, Tonico Pereira
Pas de Deux	Carlos Saldanha (Brazil)	Elena Soarez	Rodrigo Santoro, Bruna Linzmeyer
Inútil Paisagem ("Useless Landscape")	José Padilha (Brazil)	Otavio Leonidio	Wagner Moura, Cléo Pires, Caio Junqueira
O Milagre ("The Miracle")	Nadine Labaki (Lebanon)	Nadine Labaki, Khaled Mouzanar, Rodney El Haddad	Harvey Keitel, Nadine Labaki, Cauã Antunes
(transitions)	Vicente Amorim	Fellipe Barbosa	Paulo Verlings, Cláudia Abreu, Harvey Keitel, and other lead players

== Box-office ==
In 2016, U.S. theatrical and DVD receipts were $60,000.

== Critical response ==
Rio, I Love You received largely negative reviews from critics. On the review aggregator site Rotten Tomatoes, the film holds an 8% "rotten" rating based on 25 reviews, with an average rating of 3.55 out of 10. Pat Padua of The Washington Post said "the film is wonderful to look at. It’s just that the writing is consistently terrible". Ben Kenigsberg of The New York Times heavily criticized the film's lack of cohesion and its adherence to tourist-friendly depictions of Rio de Janeiro. He also noted it has the corporate sponsorship of Fiat, Unilever and others. Miami New Times' Kenji Fujishima calls it a "barrel-scraping collective project." Eye For Films Andrew Robertson rated it two stars and calls it "baffling in construction and execution" The Hollywood Reporter's unattributed review says "The only people sure to love this concoction are those working for Rio’s tourism bureau, which may well have picked the camera’s vantage points for many lush and lovely overhead shots of the city’s distinctive terrain."
