= Mame Bineta Sane =

Senegalese actress

- Born: Mame Bineta Sane; 3 February 2000 (age 26); Dakar, Sénégal
- Occupation: Actress
- Years active: 2019–present
- Known for: Atlantics

Mame Bineta Sane (born 3 February 2000), also known as Mama Sané, is a Senegalese actress. She is best known for the role as Ada in the supernatural romantic drama film Atlantics.

== Personal life ==
She grew up in Thiaroye, a suburb of Dakar, Senegal. She did not receive a regular education from school. She started to work as an apprentice tailor in Thiaroye.

== Career ==
She had not acted in any kind of drama before when she was selected for the lead role in 2019 film Atlantics directed by Mati Diop as her first feature film. Sane didn't really attend school either when Diop invite her to play the role. In the film, Sane played the lead role 'Ada', who is haunted by her lover, Souleiman, along with a boatload of other young men, is lost at sea.

The film had its premier in the capital of Dakar before its release in Senegal. The film had mainly positive reviews from critics and screened at several film festivals. The film later won the Grand Prix Award at the 2019 Cannes Film Festival. For her role, Sane later received a César nomination for Most Promising Actress in the 2020 César Awards and was also nominated for the Lumière Award for Best Female Revelation in the 2020 Lumière Awards and for the Black Reel Award for Female Outstanding Breakthrough Performance in the Black Reel Awards of 2020.

== Filmography ==
| Year | Film | Role | Genre | Ref. |
|---|---|---|---|---|
| 2019 | Atlantics | Ada | Film | |
| 2025 | Don’t Wake the Sleeping Child | Sister | Short Film | |
