= Khaled Mouzanar =

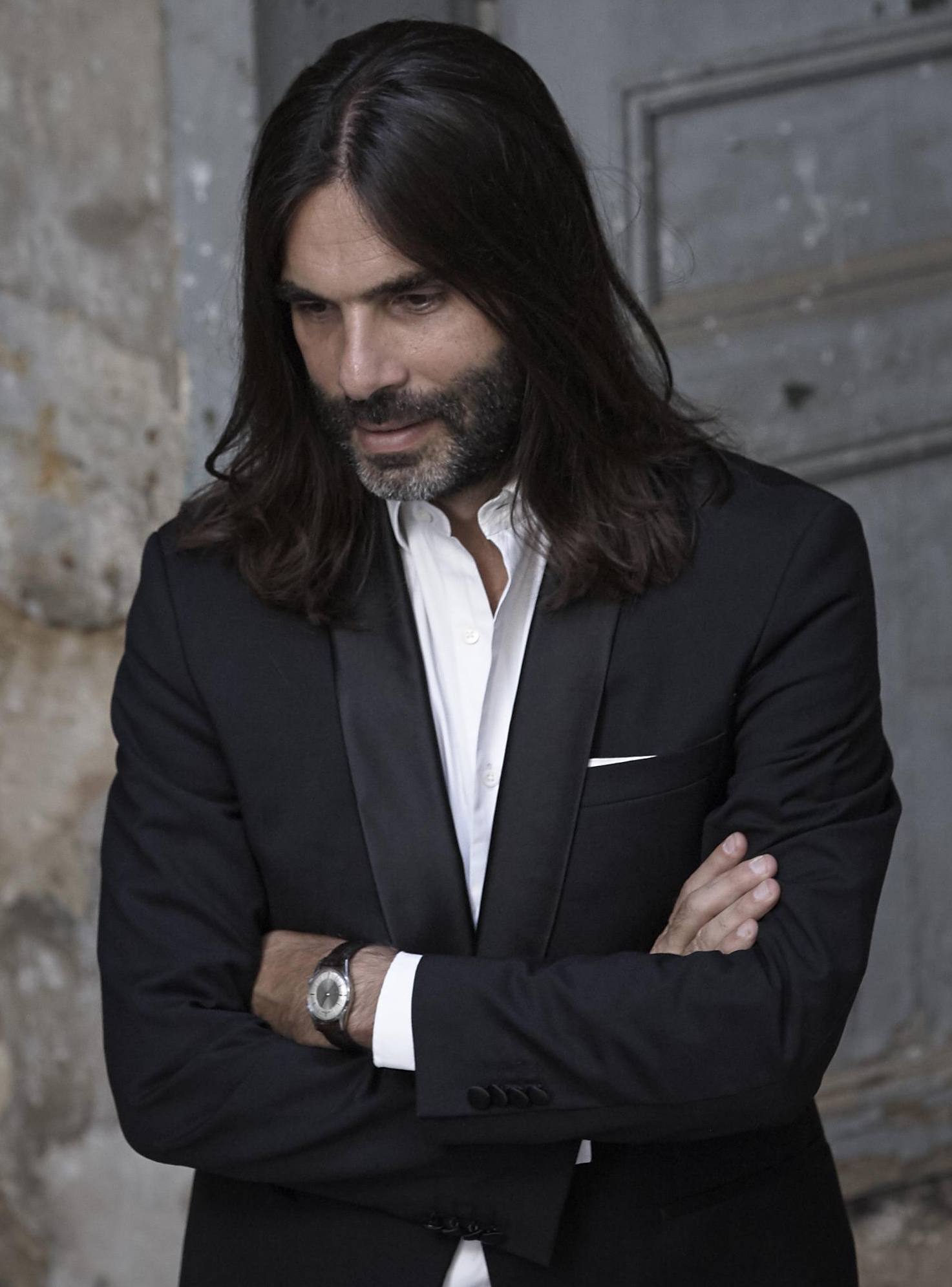

Background information
- Born: September 27, 1974 (age 52); Lebanon
- Genres: Classical, contemporary, film score, folk, tango
- Occupations: Composer, songwriter, film producer, writer
- Labels: Universal Music, Decca Records, Naive
- Website: www.mouzanar.com

Khaled Mouzanar (born September 27, 1974) is a Lebanese music composer, songwriter, writer and film producer. He has composed music scores for several films, including After Shave, Caramel, Where Do We Go Now? and Capernaum (film). In 2008, he recorded Les Champs Arides, his first solo album as a singer and songwriter. His work is rooted in various genres, including classical, contemporary and folk music. His compositions are also influenced by Brazilian choro, Argentinian tango and oriental melodies.

== Career ==
Mouzanar studied under Armenian-Lebanese composer Boghos Gelalian.

In the year 2000, he established his first label, Mooz Records, through which he produced the majority of Beirut's underground music scene. Groups such as Soap Kills and The New Government were among these productions.

One of his first professional experiences in cinema took place in 2005 with After Shave – a short film directed by Hany Tamba. The film won the Cesar Award for Best Short Film in France in 2006.

In 2007, while signing with the French independent record company Naïve Records, Mouzanar composed the score for Caramel – a feature film directed by Nadine Labaki whom he later married. That same year, Mouzanar recorded his first solo album (in French) entitled Les Champs Arides. The album was co-produced with the English producer Ian Caple. It includes a duet with French singer Barbara Carlotti. The album was described by the French magazine L'Express as "Une nouvelle promesse frissonante et racée pour la chanson française" .

In 2008, he won the UCMF (Union des Compositeurs de Musique de Film) Award for Best Music for the soundtrack of Caramel at the Cannes Film Festival.

In 2009, he composed the music for the opening ceremony of the 2009 Jeux de la Francophonie, which was viewed by 60 million spectators all over the world. French choreographer Daniel Charpentier directed the show.

In 2010, while writing for different artists such as Natacha Atlas, Mouzanar composed the music score for the film Where Do We Go Now? directed by Nadine Labaki, for which he won the award for Best Music at the 2011 Stockholm International Film Festival.

In 2014 he scored the soundtrack of the film Rio, I Love You (Portuguese: Rio, Eu Te Amo) and co-wrote the segment directed by Nadine Labaki.

In 2017 he produced, co-wrote the scenario and composed the music of Nadine Labaki’s feature film Capernaum. The film won the Jury Prize in Cannes Films Festival 2018, and was nominated at the Cesar Awards, The Golden Globes and the Academy Awards (The Oscars) for Best Foreign Film. Mouzanar also received a nomination at the British Academy Film Awards (BAFTA).

In summer 2018, Mouzanar and his orchestra opened the prestigious Baalbeck International Festival in the temple of Bacchus, with the score of Capernaum.

In 2019 Mouzanar won a Crystal Pine Award for Best Original Score at the International Sound & Film Music Festival (ISFMF) for the soundtrack of Capernaum, and was nominated for the Public Choice Award at the World Soundtrack Awards.

In 2020 Mouzanar was invited by the Academy of Motion Picture Arts and Sciences (the Oscars) to be among its distinguished members in the music branch.

That same year, he co-directed with his wife Nadine Labaki the episode 11 (Mayroun and the Unicorn) of the Netflix series Homemade.

In 2022 Mouzanar scored the soundtrack of one of Netflix's great success of the year, the movie Perfect Strangers.

That same year, Mouzanar founded the festival De Vin Et De Musique in the region of Batroun.

In 2025, Mouzanar conceived “18:08-When Gravity Was No More” as a large-scale immersive installation reflecting on the Beirut port explosion of 4 August 2020 and its aftermath. The work recreates a suspended moment in which everyday objects—furniture, architectural fragments, musical instruments, and personal belongings—appear frozen in mid-air, as if gravity had momentarily ceased to exist. Visitors walk through a three-dimensional tableau that evokes both the violence of the blast and the surreal stillness that followed it. An original sound composition by Mouzanar, titled The Pulse, accompanies the installation. The installation that was part of We Design Beirut draws directly from Mouzanar’s personal experience: his music studio and office were destroyed in the blast, and several suspended objects reference real items recovered from the site. The work functions both as a memorial and as an artistic testimony, blending documentary fragments with poetic abstraction.

Among Mouzanar’s contemporary works is also “Le Monde va à la guerre et moi j’en reviens”, the first chapter of an animated feature film in preparation with Nadine Labaki and Jorj Mhaya, which was presented as an installation at the Biennale d'art contemporain de Lyon in 2022.

In 2025 he also collaborated on the song “Toi l’enfant” on the album Lamomali by French artist –M– (Matthieu Chedid), a project blending pop, African, and world music influences.

In 2026, Mouzanar was appointed as a jury member of the Un Certain Regard section at the Cannes Film Festival.

Mouzanar is also an activist working for the preservation of Lebanon’s heritage by preventing the demolition of traditional houses and preserving green spaces. He is also the co-founder of the Capernaum Foundation which takes care of children with no access to education.

== Discography ==
- 2005: After Shave (OST) (Cesar for best Short Movie 2006)
- 2007: Caramel (OST) (Best Music Award – UCMF in Cannes 2008)
- 2008: Les Champs Arides (Song-writer)
- 2009: Melodrama Habibi (OST)
- 2011: Where Do We Go Now? (OST) (Best Music Award 2011 – Stockholm International Film Festival)
- 2014: Rio, I Love You (OST)
- 2018: Capernaum (OST) (Best Original Score 2019 - International Sound & Film Music Festival)
- 2022: Perfect Strangers (OST)

== Filmography ==
- 2014: Rio, I Love You (Co-Writer of the segment "O Milagre")
- 2018: Capernaum (Co-Writer)
- 2020: Homemade (co-director of the episode "Mayroun and the Unicorn")
