= Homemade (TV series) =

Italian-Chilean anthology television series

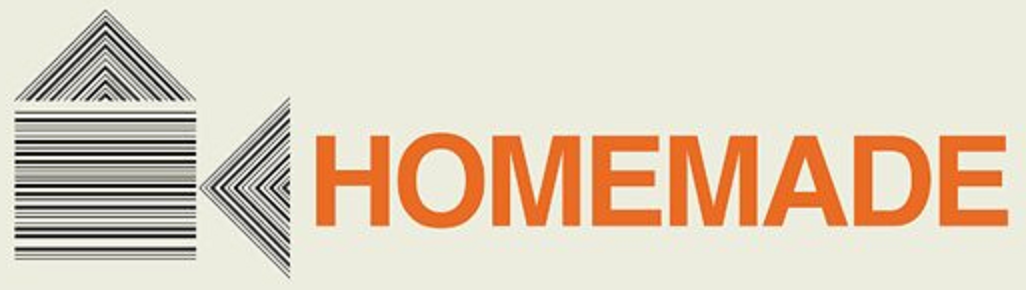
- Title card
- Directed by: Ladj Ly; Paolo Sorrentino; Rachel Morrison; Pablo Larraín; Rungano Nyoni; Natalia Beristáin; Sebastian Schipper; Naomi Kawase; David Mackenzie; Maggie Gyllenhaal; Nadine Labaki; Khaled Mouzanar; Antonio Campos; Johnny Ma; Kristen Stewart; Gurinder Chadha; Sebastián Lelio; Ana Lily Amirpour
- Countries of origin: Italy; Chile
- Original language: English

Production
- Producers: Pablo Larraín; Juan de Dios Larraín; Lorenzo Mieli
- Running time: 4-11 minutes
- Production companies: Fabula; The Apartment Pictures

Original release
- Release: June 30, 2020

Homemade is an Italian-Chilean television anthology series, following stories during the COVID-19 pandemic in the form of short films produced by filmmakers from all around the world. On June 30, 2020, it was released by Netflix on its platform.

The short-film series was removed from Netflix on December 31, 2021.

== Production ==
In June 2020, it was announced Ladj Ly, Paolo Sorrentino, Rachel Morrison, Pablo Larraín, Rungano Nyoni, Natalia Beristáin, Sebastian Schipper, Naomi Kawase, David Mackenzie, Maggie Gyllenhaal, Nadine Labaki, Khaled Mouzanar, Antonio Campos, Johnny Ma, Kristen Stewart, Gurinder Chadha, Sebastián Lelio and Ana Lily Amirpour would participate in an anthology short film series, with Larraín producing the series under his Fabula banner, with Netflix distributing.

== Episodes ==
No.	Title	Directed by	Written by	Original release date
1	"Clichy-Montfermeil"	Ladj Ly	Al Hassan Ly & Ladj Ly	June 30, 2020
Buzz sends his drone over Montfermeil, France and captures the contrasts brought about by the COVID-19 pandemic, in a nod to the director's 2019 film Les Misérables. Cast: Al Hassan Ly
2	"Voyage Au Bout De La Nuit"	Paolo Sorrentino	Paolo Sorrentino	June 30, 2020
Queen Elizabeth II visits Pope Francis at the Vatican, where she learns she can't return to London due to the lockdown in Italy. While in quarantine, the pair begin to flirt, dance, and one day, skinny-dip in a pool. The Queen notices how the lockdown has shown the pair just how lonely they truly are. Cast: Javier Cámara, Olivia Williams
3	"The Lucky Ones"	Rachel Morrison	Rachel Morrison	June 30, 2020
A mother composes a poem for her 5-year-old child, hoping he'll remember what it was like growing up during the COVID-19 pandemic. Cast: Rachel Morrison, Wiley Morrison, Cleo Morrison
4	"Last Call"	Pablo Larraín	Pablo Larraín	June 30, 2020
A man in a nursing home sets up a video conference with a former girlfriend, who he confesses his never-ending love for. When she refuses to come over before he dies, the man reveals he has already called multiple of his exes, who have also refused. She hangs up, and the man asks the nurse to call another one of his exes. Cast: Jaime Vadell, Mercedes Morán, Delfina Guzmán, Coca Guazzini, Shlomit Baytelman, Gabriela Arancibia
5	"Couple Splits Up While In Lockdown LOL"	Rungano Nyoni	Reto Caffi, Besa Chisanga, Susan Eigbefoh, Gabriel Gauchet, Mubanga Kalimamukwento, Ndaba Mazibuko, Rungano Nyoni	June 30, 2020
A woman breaks up with her boyfriend, who has already started using Tinder. After searching for the neighbor's lost dog, the couple decides to start dating each other again. Cast: Bia Djassi, Joaquim Filipe dos Santos Costa, Magui Oliu
6	"Espacios"	Natalia Beristáin	Natalia Beristáin	June 30, 2020
A little girl named Jacinta tries her best to keep herself entertained and occupied at home, while in quarantine. Cast: Jacinta Terrazas Beristain, Olivia Chernicoff Guala, Mila Margolis Denti, Diego Margolis Denti
7	"Casino"	Sebastian Schipper	Sebastian Schipper	June 30, 2020
A man begins to have hallucinations of himself from days prior. A few days later, the man becomes friends with his hallucinations, only to realize he's gone insane. Cast: Sebastian Schipper
8	"Last Message"	Naomi Kawase	Naomi Kawase	June 30, 2020
After finding out how many people are left on Earth, a boy in Japan begins to contemplate how precious life truly is. Cast: Mitsuki
9	"Ferosa"	David Mackenzie	Ferosa Mackenzie & David Mackenzie	June 30, 2020
A girl in Glasgow, Scotland tries to do the most she can while in isolation with her family, wondering what she will do when the pandemic is over. Cast: Ferosa Mackenzie, Arthur Mackenzie, Luke Mackenzie, Holly Gilchrist, Gilly Gilchrist, Hazel Mall, Kathryn Howden
10	"Penelope"	Maggie Gyllenhaal	Maggie Gyllenhaal	June 30, 2020
While a mysterious virus attacks the planet, a man tries his best to continue his daily routines. After learning the virus's death toll has reached half a billion people, and that the virus has caused the moon to orbit closer to the Earth, the man attempts to cope with his new environment. Cast: Peter Sarsgaard, Nermeen Shaikh
11	"Mayroun and the Unicorn"	Nadine Labaki & Khaled Mouzanar	Nadine Labaki & Khaled Mouzanar	June 30, 2020
Trapped in her dad's office, a little girl named Mayroun begins to create an imaginary world with her toy unicorn, where she begs to be freed. Cast: Mayroun, Khaled Mouzanar
12	"Annex"	Antonio Campos	Brady Corbet, Mona Fastvold, Antonio Campos	June 30, 2020
While at a beach, a couple's daughter finds an unconscious man near the shore. After taking him home, and letting him spend the night, the couple begins to wonder who the man might be. The next day, the man jumps into the family's pool, and the couple's daughter runs to the beach, where she finds the man, unconscious, once again. Cast: Christopher Abbott, Mona Fastvold, Sofia Subercaseaux, Ada Fastvold-Corbet, Emilio Subercaseaux Campos, Mary Corbet
13	"Johnny Ma"	Johnny Ma	Johnny Ma	June 30, 2020
A man shares a glimpse of life during isolation in Mexico and makes dumplings in a heartfelt video letter to his mom, who might never watch it. Cast: Johnny Ma, the Lovera family
14	"Crickets"	Kristen Stewart	Kristen Stewart	June 30, 2020
Being taunted by crickets, a woman begins to suffer from insomnia. Cast: Kristen Stewart, Dylan Meyer
15	"Unexpected Gift"	Gurinder Chadha	Kumiko Chadha Berges, Ronak Chadha Berges, Gurinder Chadha, Paul Mayeda Berges	June 30, 2020
Gurinder Chadha talks about her loving family's life in lockdown. Cast: Gurinder Chadha, Kumiko Chadha Berges, Ronak Chadha Berges, Paul Mayeda Berges
16	"Algoritmo"	Sebastián Lelio	Sebastián Lelio	June 30, 2020
A woman sings about how the pandemic has affected humanity. Cast: Amalia Kassai
17	"Ride It Out"	Ana Lily Amirpour	Ana Lily Amirpour	June 30, 2020
A woman's bike ride begins to captivate how the lockdown has affected Los Angeles, California. Cast: Ana Lily Amirpour, Cate Blanchett

== Reception ==
The series was released on June 30, 2020, on Netflix. On review aggregator Rotten Tomatoes, Homemade has an approval rating of 94% based on 17 reviews, with an average rating of 7.5/10. The website's critical consensus reads, "Not all of Homemade's segments are created equal, but together they stand as a fascinating examination of the strength of the human spirit in turbulent times."

IndieWire described the series as "pure filmmaking talent in bite-sized pieces that doubles as a lively, scattershot collage of the world in 2020." The site also gave Homemade a rating grade of an A−. Decider's Anna Menta praised the short Crickets by Kristen Stewart, describing the short as "jump cuts, not-so-great sound, existential mumblings, and a plot that’s not really a plot. Still, Stewart is an incredible actress, and you can see every micro-expression on her face in the extreme close-ups."
