= Zain Al Rafeea =

Syrian-born actor (born 2004)

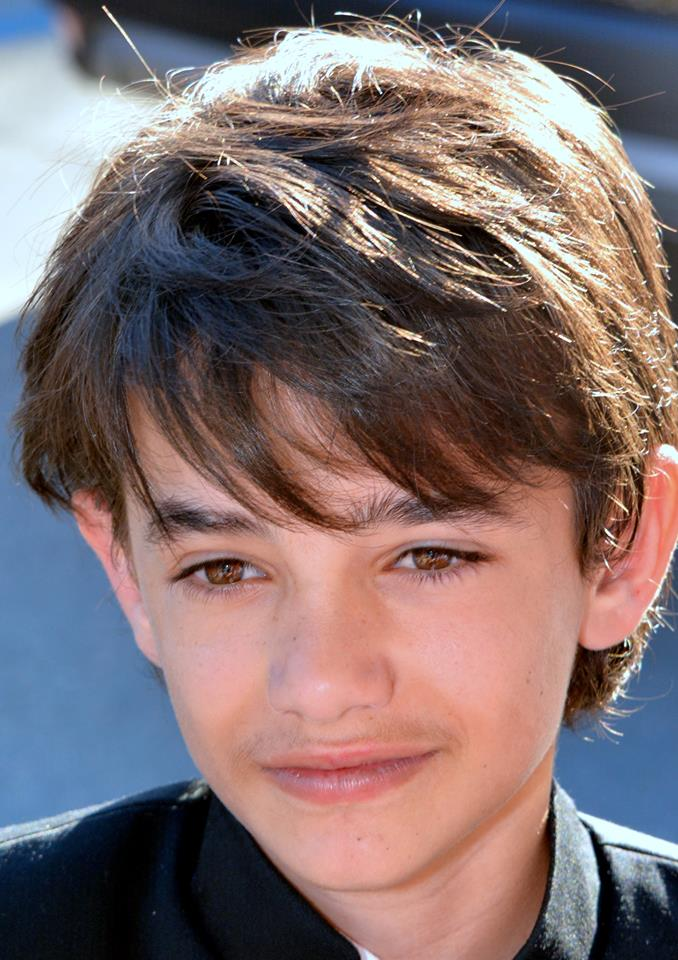
- 13-year old Al Rafeea at the 2018 Cannes Film Festival.
- Born: 10 October 2004 (age 21); Daraa, Syria
- Citizenship: Norway
- Occupation: Actor

Zain Al Rafeea (Arabic: زين الرافعي, born 10 October 2004) is a Syrian actor living in Norway. He is best known for his starring role in the 2018 Lebanese film Capernaum, which won the Jury Prize at the 2018 Cannes Film Festival.

== Life and career ==
Al Rafeea was born in Daraa, Syria in 2004 before his family moved to Lebanon in 2012. A Syrian refugee, he grew up in the slums of Beirut with his parents. He was 12 and illiterate during the production of Capernaum. He had no acting experience. Al Rafeea's Capernaum character, Zain, is named for him.

In November 2018, director Nadine Labaki reported that Al Rafeea received a Norwegian passport in Norway and had been living there for several months: "He's going to school for the first time in his life. He's learning how to read and write. He's regained his childhood. He's playing in a garden; he's not playing anymore with knives and in garbage." Al Rafeea began attending school in Hammerfest.

For Capernaum, Al Rafeea was nominated for the Asia Pacific Screen Award for Best Performance by an Actor. He also won Best Actor at the 2018 International Antalya Film Festival. The New York Times called his as performances one of the best of 2018. Wesley Morris wrote, "Every once in a while, you leave a movie having seen a performance that mocks all the other acting that came before it". James Verniere of the Boston Herald described Al Rafeea as "part Oliver Twist, part James Dean".

In 2021, he appeared as a villager in the Marvel Cinematic Universe (MCU) film Eternals.

== Filmography ==
Year	Title	Role	Notes
2018	Capernaum	Zain El Hajj	
2021	Eternals	Mesopotamian Young Man	
2024	The Sand Castle	Adam	

== Awards and nominations ==
Year	Award	Category	Nominated work	Result	Ref
2018	Antalya Golden Orange Film Festival	Best Actor	Capernaum	Won	
2018	Asia Pacific Screen Awards	Best Performance by an Actor	Capernaum	Nominated	
2018	New Mexico Film Critics	Best Young Actor/Actress	Capernaum	Won	
2019	The Lebanese Movie Awards	Best Ensemble Cast	Capernaum	Nominated	
2019	FEST International Film Festival	Best Debut	Capernaum	Won	
2019	40th Annual Young Artist Awards	Breakout Performance Award	Capernaum	Won	
