= Diankou Sembene =

Senegalese actor

- Born: Diankou Sembene; Dakar, Sénégal
- Occupation: Actor
- Years active: 2019–present
- Known for: Atlantics

Diankou Sembene, is a Sénégalese actor. He is best known for the role as 'Mr. Ndiaye' in the supernatural romantic drama film Atlantics.

== Career ==
In 2019, Sembene was selected for the film Atlantics directed by Mati Diop as her first feature film. The film had its premier in the capital of Dakar before its release in Senegal. The film had mainly positive reviews from critics and screened at several film festivals. The film later won the Grand Prix Award at the 2019 Cannes Film Festival.

After the success of the film, he acted in the television serial ZeroZeroZero and short film Corruption.

== Filmography ==
| Year | Film | Role | Genre | Ref. |
|---|---|---|---|---|
| 2019 | Atlantics | Mr. Ndiaye | Film | |
| 2019 | ZeroZeroZero | Inspector General Oumar Sukus | TV series | |
| 2019 | Corruption | Chief Police | Short film | |
