= The Sand Castle (2024 film) =

- من وراء الموج
- Directed by: Matty Brown
- Written by: Hend Fakhroo; Matty Brown; Yassmina Karajah
- Produced by: Gianluca Chakra; Mandy Ward; Houston King; Mario Haddad Jr.
- Starring: Nadine Labaki; Ziad Bakri; Zain Al Rafeea; Riman Al Rafeea
- Cinematography: Jeremy Snell
- Music by: Kat Vokes; West Dylan Thordson
- Production company: Front Row Filmed Entertainment
- Distributed by: Netflix
- Release dates: December 8, 2024 (Red Sea International Film Festival); January 24, 2025 (Netflix)
- Running time: 98 minutes
- Countries: Lebanon; United Arab Emirates; United States
- Language: Arabic

The Sand Castle is a 2024 Arabic fantasy thriller film directed by Matty Brown.

== Plot ==
The story follows a family consisting of Yasmine, Nabil, and their children, Adam and Jana, who arrive on an uninhabited island after an unspecified calamity forces them to leave their homeland. They take shelter in an abandoned lighthouse and attempt to sustain themselves by rationing limited supplies while awaiting rescue. Over time, Adam grows anxious and confrontational regarding their survival prospects, while Jana retreats into her imagination as a coping mechanism. The discovery of a body bag near the shore and a radio broadcast about migrants drowning further accentuate the isolation brought on by the failure of their makeshift radio.

Eventually, the story reveals that the island and lighthouse exist only in Jana's mind. In reality, she is alone in a lifeboat, fleeing a war-torn country. This revelation reframes earlier events as elements of an imaginative construct designed to shield her from the harsh realities of her situation. The film concludes by drawing attention to the experiences of children affected by armed conflict and their reliance on imaginative strategies to manage trauma, offering a study in resilience and the psychological responses to extreme circumstances.

== Cast ==
- Nadine Labaki as Yasmine
- Ziad Bakri as Nabil
- Zain Al Rafeea as Adam
- Riman Al Rafeea as Jana

== Release ==
The Sand Castle premiered at the 4th Red Sea International Film Festival in Jeddah, Saudi Arabia, on December 8, 2024, and was subsequently released worldwide on Netflix on January 24, 2025.

== Critical reception ==
The Sand Castle received generally positive reviews from film critics. Comic Book Resources in its review wrote "The Sand Castle has all the visual invention of Michel Gondry and Charlie Kaufman's Eternal Sunshine of the Spotless Mind, without the star power of Jim Carrey and Kate Winslet." Glenn Kenny reviewed the film for RogerEbert.com, awarding it three out of four stars and praising the picture's allegory and the questions it leaves the viewer with after the credits roll. Razmig Bedirian reviewing for The National wrote "By the end of The Sand Castle, and after a suffocating viewing experience, you're left with fragmented puzzle pieces and a faint idea of the film's intent." Decider compared The Sand Castle to Nadine Labaki's Capernaum, noting their shared themes of forced migration and childhood trauma.
