= Paris Memories =

2022 film by Alice Winocour

- Theatrical release poster
- French: Revoir Paris
- Directed by: Alice Winocour
- Written by: Alice Winocour
- Produced by: Isabelle Madelaine; Emilie Tisné
- Starring: Virginie Efira; Benoît Magimel; Grégoire Colin; Maya Sansa; Amadou Mbow; Nastya Golubeva; Anne-Lise Heimburger; Sofia Lesaffre; Clarisse Makundul
- Cinematography: Stéphane Fontaine
- Edited by: Julien Lacheray
- Music by: Anna von Hausswolff
- Production companies: Dharamsala; Darius Films; Pathé; France 3 Cinéma
- Distributed by: Pathé
- Release dates: 21 May 2022 (Cannes); 7 September 2022 (France); 23 June 2023 (United States)
- Running time: 105 minutes
- Country: France
- Language: French
- Box office: $3.7 million

Paris Memories (French: Revoir Paris) is a 2022 French drama film written and directed by Alice Winocour. The film stars Virginie Efira as Mia, a woman who is struggling with the lingering mental health effects of having survived a terrorist attack in Paris months earlier.

The film's cast also includes Benoît Magimel, Grégoire Colin, Maya Sansa, Amadou Mbow, Nastya Golubeva, Anne-Lise Heimburger, Sofia Lesaffre and Clarisse Makundul.

== Synopsis ==
Mia works as a Russian interpreter in Paris. Her partner Vincent is the head of a department at a hospital in the city. One evening at a restaurant with Vincent, their meal is interrupted by Vincent being telephoned and called away on an emergency and Mia finds herself alone. While riding home on her motorcycle, a storm surprises Mia and she takes refuge at random in a restaurant called "L'Étoile d'or". Mia waits, making notes for her next assignment and drinking alone waiting for the storm to pass. A few moments later the restaurant is attacked by terrorists, who machine-gun the customers and finish off everything that moves. Mia hides.

Mia survives the attack but is traumatized, and after being discharged from hospital spends the next three months in the countryside, with her mother. Her abdominal wound is healing, but the attack has left Mia partially amnesiac and unable to remember most of the event. Eager to heal and understand what happened, Mia returns to Paris. She joins a victims' support association, meets a teenager grieving for her parents, and is insulted by a woman who accuses her of locking herself in the bathroom, without letting other people in. She also meets Thomas, who was celebrating his birthday that evening with colleagues. He is seriously injured in the legs, but has retained all of his memory.

Little by little, Mia finds fragments of memory. She realizes that she spent a long time in a hiding place with a restaurant kitchen employee who reassured her and held her hand while waiting for the police. She wants to know if he survived and decides to find him, but her search is complicated by the fact that he is an illegal immigrant. She moves away from Vincent, who cannot understand what she is going through and becomes closer to Thomas. She learns that the cook she was hiding with is named Assane. The woman who accused her of locking herself in the bathroom confesses to her that it was she who did it. She finally finds Assane who has become a street vendor of souvenirs near the Eiffel Tower. Without saying anything, she lets him know how grateful she is.

== Cast ==
- Virginie Efira as Mia
- Benoît Magimel as Thomas
- Grégoire Colin as Vincent
- Maya Sansa as Sara
- Amadou Mbow as Assane
- Nastya Golubeva Carax as Félicia
- Anne-Lise Heimburger as Camille
- Sokem "Kemso" Ringuet as Hakim
- Sofia Lesaffre as Nour
- Dolores Chaplin as la femme de Thomas

== Release ==
The film premiered in the Directors' Fortnight program of the 2022 Cannes Film Festival. It is had its North American premiere at the 2022 Toronto International Film Festival. It was released theatrically in France on 7 September 2022 by Pathé.

== Reception ==
The film received critical acclaim. Paris Memories has an approval rating of 94% on review aggregator website Rotten Tomatoes, based on 64 reviews, and an average rating of 7.4/10. The website's critical consensus states: "Further distinguished by Virginie Efira's superb performance, Revoir Paris explores trauma's aftermath with devastating tenderness". Metacritic assigned the film a weighted average score of 71 out of 100, based on 17 critics, indicating "generally favorable reviews".
