= Capernaum (film) =

2018 film directed by Nadine Labaki

- Theatrical release poster
- Arabic: كفرناحوم
- Directed by: Nadine Labaki
- Screenplay by: Nadine Labaki; Jihad Hojaily; Michelle Keserwany
- Story by: Georges Khabbaz; Nadine Labaki; Michelle Keserwany; Jihad Hojaily; Khaled Mouzanar
- Produced by: Khaled Mouzanar; Michel Merkt
- Starring: Zain Al Rafeea; Yordanos Shiferaw; Boluwatife Treasure Bankole; Kawthar Al Haddad; Fadi Kamel Youssef; Nour el Husseini; Alaa Chouchnieh; Cedra Izam; Nadine Labaki; Joseph Jimbazian; Farah Hasno
- Cinematography: Christopher Aoun
- Edited by: Konstantin Bock; Laure Gardette
- Music by: Khaled Mouzanar
- Production company: Mooz Films
- Distributed by: Sony Pictures Classics
- Release dates: 17 May 2018 (Cannes); 20 September 2018 (Lebanon)
- Running time: 126 minutes
- Country: Lebanon
- Language: Levantine Arabic
- Budget: $4 million
- Box office: $68.6 million

Capernaum (Arabic: كفرناحوم, romanized: Kafr nāħūm) is a 2018 Lebanese drama film directed by Nadine Labaki and produced by Khaled Mouzanar. The screenplay was written by Labaki, Jihad Hojaily and Michelle Keserwany from a story by Labaki, Hojaily, Keserwany, Georges Khabbaz and Khaled Mouzanar. The film stars Syrian refugee child actor Zain Al Rafeea as Zain El Hajj, a 12-year-old living in the slums of Beirut. Capernaum is told in flashback format, focusing on Zain's life, including his encounter with an Ethiopian immigrant Rahil and her infant son Yonas, and leading up to his attempt to sue his parents for child neglect.

The film debuted at the 2018 Cannes Film Festival, where it was selected to compete for the Palme d'Or, and won the Jury Prize. Capernaum received a 15-minute standing ovation following its premiere at Cannes on 17 May 2018. Sony Pictures Classics, which had previously distributed Labaki's Where Do We Go Now?, bought North and Latin American and South African distribution rights to the film, while Wild Bunch retained the international rights. It received a wider release on 20 September 2018.

Capernaum received critical acclaim, with particular praise given to Labaki's direction, Al Rafeea's performance and the film's "documentary-like realism". Writing for The New York Times, Manohla Dargis and A. O. Scott named it as one of the greatest films of 2018. It was nominated for the Academy Award for Best Foreign Language Film at the 91st Academy Awards, among several other accolades.

Capernaum is both the highest-grossing Arabic and Middle Eastern film of all time, after becoming a sleeper hit at the international box office with over $68 million worldwide, against a production budget of $4 million. Its largest international market is China, where it became a surprise blockbuster with over $54 million.

== Plot ==
Zain El Hajj, a 12-year-old from the slums of Beirut, is serving a five-year prison sentence in Roumieh Prison for stabbing someone whom he refers to as a "son of a bitch". Neither Zain nor his parents know his exact date of birth as they never applied/received an official birth certificate. Zain is brought before a court, having decided to take civil action against his parents, his mother, Souad, and his father, Selim. When asked by the judge why he wants to sue his parents, Zain answers "Because I was born" (or, more precisely, "because you had me"). Meanwhile, Lebanese authorities process a group of migrant workers, including a young Ethiopian woman named Rahil.

The story then flashes back several months to before Zain was arrested. Zain lives with his parents and takes care of at least seven younger siblings who make money in various schemes instead of going to school. He uses forged prescriptions to purchase tramadol pills from multiple pharmacies, which they crush into powder, dissolve in water then soak some clothes, hang these to dry and finally, their mother sells the garments to drug addicts in prison. Zain also works as a delivery boy for Assad, the family's landlord and owner of a local market stall. One morning, Zain helps his 11-year-old sister Sahar to hide the evidence of her first period, fearing she will be married to Assad if her parents discover that she can now become pregnant.

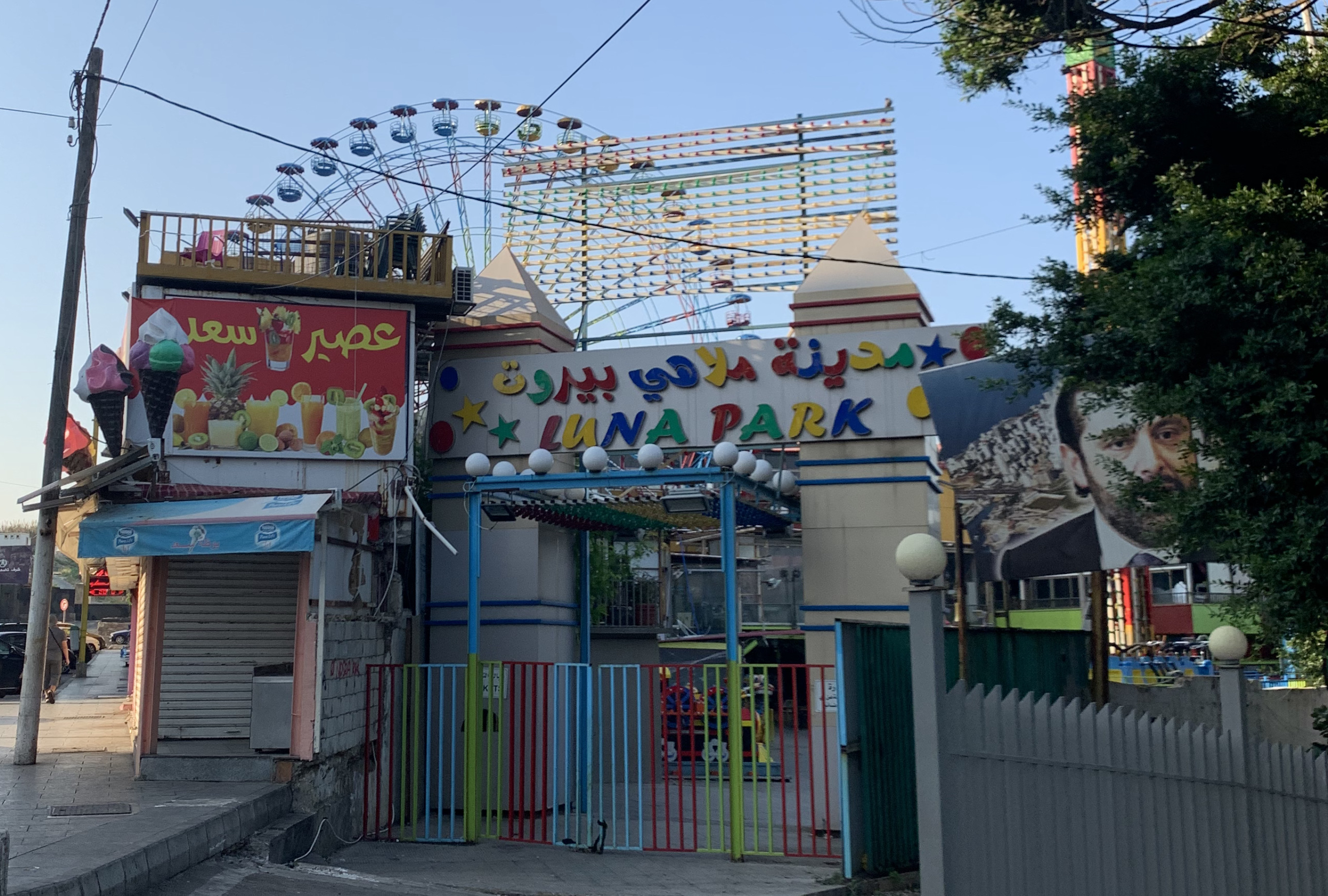
The entrance to Luna Park, Ras Beirut, where Zain meets Rahil

Zain makes plans to escape with Sahar and begin a new life. However, his suspicions are proven correct as her parents marry off Sahar to Assad in exchange for two chickens. Furious at his parents, Zain runs away and catches a bus, where he meets an elderly man dressed in a knock-off Spider-Man costume who calls himself "Cockroach Man". Cockroach Man gets off the bus at the Luna Park in Ras Beirut and Zain follows him, spending the rest of the day at the park. While on the Ferris wheel, Zain sees a beautiful sunset and begins to cry. Later, Zain meets Rahil, an Ethiopian migrant worker who is working as a cleaner at the park. She takes pity on Zain and agrees to let him live with her at her tin shack in exchange for Zain babysitting her undocumented infant son Yonas when she is at work.

Rahil's forged migrant documents are due to expire soon, and she does not have enough money to pay her forger Aspro for new documents. Aspro offers to forge the documents for free if she gives Yonas to him so that Yonas can be adopted. Rahil refuses, despite Aspro's claims that Yonas' undocumented status will mean he can never receive an education or be employed. Rahil's documents expire and she is arrested by Lebanese authorities. After she does not return to the shack, Zain panics. Several days pass, and Zain begins looking after Yonas on his own, claiming that they are brothers, and begins selling tramadol again to earn money.

One day, while at Souk Al Ahad, where Aspro is based, Zain meets a young girl named Maysoun. Maysoun is a Syrian refugee and claims that Aspro has agreed to send her to Sweden. Zain demands that Aspro send him to Sweden as well, which Aspro agrees to do if Zain gives him Yonas. After the landlord has locked him out of Rahil's house where all his money and things are, Zain reluctantly agrees and leaves Yonas with him. Aspro tells him that he will need some form of identification to become a refugee. Zain returns to his parents and demands they give him his identification, to which they laughingly tell him he does not have any. Having disowned him for leaving, they kick him out of their house, but not before revealing that Sahar had recently died due to difficulties with her pregnancy. Furious, Zain takes a large knife, runs out the house and stabs Assad. Zain is arrested and sentenced to five years at Roumieh Prison.

While in prison, during a visit from his mother, Zain learns that Souad is pregnant yet again and plans to name the child Sahar. Disgusted by his mother's lack of remorse for his sister's death, he tells her not to visit again, calling her "heartless". During a TV show requesting call-in commentary on child abuse, Zain contacts the media and says that he is tired of parents neglecting their children and plans to sue his own parents for continuing to have children when they cannot take care of them. When the judge asks him what he wants from his parents, he says "I want them to stop having children", as he does not want the rest of his surviving siblings or any other children that his parents may have in the future to suffer the same neglect and abuse that he and Sahar both endured. Zain also alleges that Aspro is adopting children illegally and mistreating them; the court then rules in Zain's favor, with Zain winning the case and gaining justice for Sahar's death. Aspro's house is raided and the children and parents are reunited, including Yonas and Rahil.

Zain's photo is taken for his ID card. The photographer cracks a joke at Zain's sour disposition—"It's your ID card, not your death certificate"—and Zain manages a smile.

== Cast ==
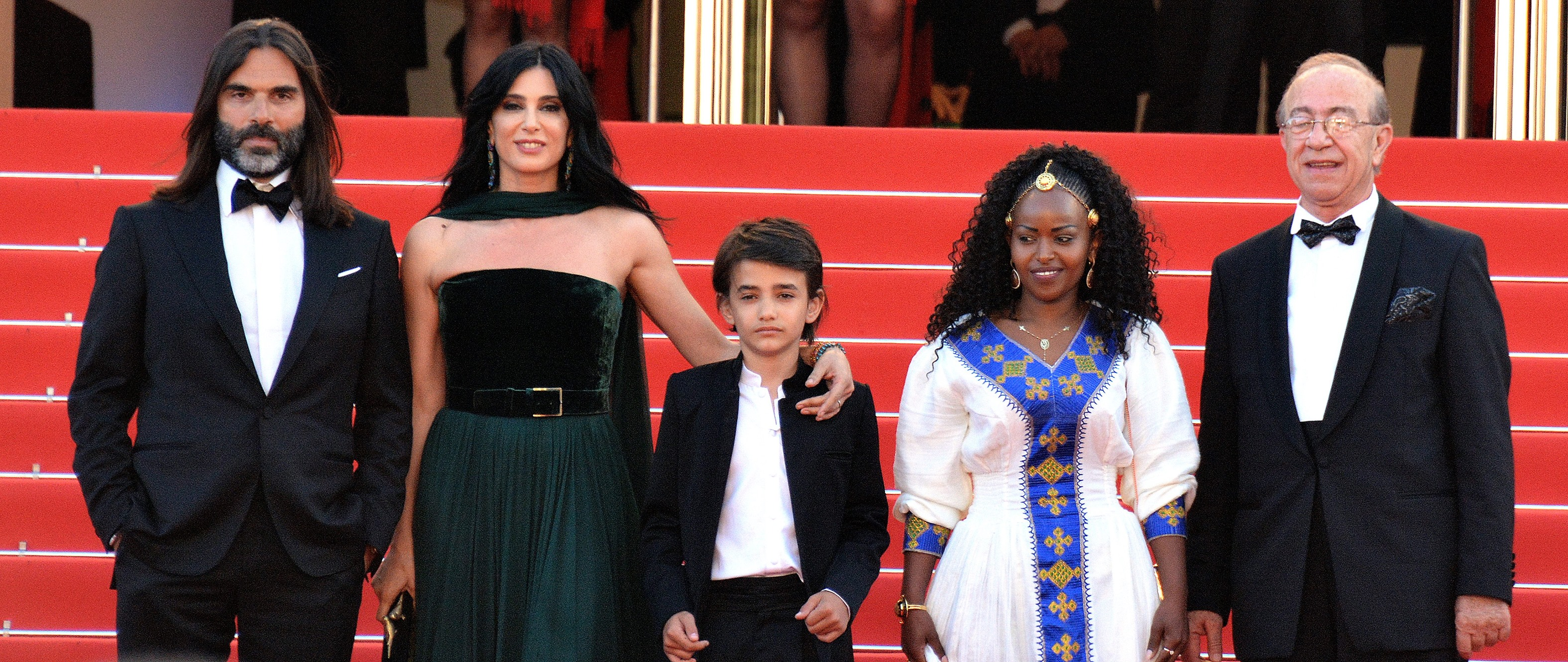
Cast and director at the 2018 Cannes Film Festival

- Zain Al Rafeea as Zain El Hajj, a 12-year-old boy living in the slums of Beirut
- Yordanos Shiferaw as Rahil (also known as Tigest), an undocumented Ethiopian woman who works as a cleaner at an amusement park
- Boluwatife Treasure Bankole (a girl) as Yonas, Rahil's undocumented son
- Kawthar Al Haddad as Souad, Zain's mother
- Fadi Kamel Youssef as Selim, Zain's father
- Nour el Husseini as Assad, the owner of a local market and Sahar's husband
- Alaa Chouchnieh as Aspro, Rahil's forger
- Cedra Izzam as Sahar, Zain's sister
- Nadine Labaki as Nadine, Zain's lawyer
- Joseph Jimbazian as Mr. Harout (also known as Cockroach Man), an employee at an amusement park
- Farah Hasno as Maysoun, a young Syrian refugee

== Production ==
Screenwriter and director Nadine Labaki described the conception of the film:

At the end of the day, ... children are really paying a very high price for our conflicts, and our wars, and our systems, and our stupid decisions, and governments. I felt the need to talk about the problem, and I was thinking, if those children could talk, or could express themselves, what would they say? What would they tell us, this society that ignores them?

The film was produced on a budget of $4 million. Producer Khaled Mouzanar took out a mortgage on his house to raise a budget.

Zain Al Rafeea, a Syrian refugee living in the slums of Beirut since 2012, was 12 during production. Al Rafeea's character, Zain, is named for him. Many of the other actors were novices, which Labaki described as necessary because she wanted "a real struggle on that big screen". Al Rafeea contributed to shaping the film's dialogue, drawing on his experiences as a refugee living in a slum.

Although Labaki is also an actress, she gave herself only a small role, preferring the realist actors to draw from their own experiences. Shooting lasted six months and resulted in 500 hours of rushes, which took her and her editing team a year and a half to edit down to 2 hours. The first version of the film was 12 hours long, but working in sometimes 24-hour editing shifts with her editors, she was able to cut the film in time. She became very close to her editing team over this period and referred to them, and her crew, as her family.

== Reception ==
=== Box office ===
As of 26 May 2019, the film grossed $68,583,867 worldwide, against a production budget of $4 million. It became the highest-grossing Arabic film, and the highest-grossing Middle Eastern film of all time, surpassing the $21 million box office record of Labaki's earlier film Where Do We Go Now? (2012).

The film had a limited release in the United States and Canada on 14 December 2018. The film went on to gross $1,661,096 in the United States and Canada, as of 30 May 2019. Outside of the United States and Canada, the film grossed $66.925 million in international markets, as of 26 May 2019.

It was released in China on 29 April 2019, and debuted at number two there, behind Avengers: Endgame. Capernaum became a sleeper hit in China, with the help of strong word-of-mouth on Chinese social media (including platforms such as Douban and TikTok). By 5 May 2019, Capernaum had grossed $25.22 million in China, becoming the weekend's second top-grossing film internationally, behind only Avengers: Endgame. By 16 May 2019, the film had crossed CN¥300 million ($44 million) in China, in just over two weeks, becoming a surprise blockbuster at the Chinese box office. As of 29 June 2019, the film has grossed $54,315,148 in China.

=== Critical response ===
Capernaum has an approval rating of 90% based on reviews by 181 critics on Rotten Tomatoes with an average rating of 7.9/10. The website's critics consensus reads, "Capernaum hits hard, but rewards viewers with a smart, compassionate, and ultimately stirring picture of lives in the balance." On Metacritic, the film has a weighted average score of 75 out of 100 based on reviews from 33 critics, indicating "generally favorable reviews".

Many reviews were highly positive. A. O. Scott of The New York Times ranked it as the ninth greatest film of 2018, writing "naturalism meets melodrama in this harrowing, hectic tale of a lost boy’s adventures in the slums and shantytowns of Beirut...Labaki refuses to lose sight of the exuberance, grit and humor that people hold onto even in moments of the greatest desperation." Variety's Jay Weissberg judged Capernaum to represent a substantial improvement in Labaki's direction, bringing "intelligence and heart" to its issue. The Hollywood Reporter critic Leslie Felperin called it an effective melodrama. On Vulture.com, Emily Yoshida called Zain Al Rafeea "a startling, unforgettable presence". Yoshida also interpreted it as "one of the most forcefully pro-choice films I've ever seen", though abortion is not directly mentioned.

Some reviews were more mixed. Writing for The A.V. Club, A.A. Dowd called the film a "sadness pile that confuses nonstop hardship for drama, begging for our tears at every moment". IndieWire critic David Ehrlich also wrote a mixed review, calling it "an astonishing work of social-realism that's diluted (and ultimately defeated) by an array of severe miscalculations".

=== Accolades ===
The film was selected as the Lebanese entry for Best Foreign Language Film at the 91st Academy Awards. It made the December shortlist in 2018, before being nominated for the Academy Award in January 2019.

Award	Date of ceremony	Category	Recipient(s)	Result	Ref(s)
Academy Awards	24 February 2019	Best Foreign Language Film	Lebanon	Nominated	
Alliance of Women Film Journalists	10 January 2019	Best Non-English Film	Nadine Labaki	Nominated	
Alliance of Women Film Journalists	10 January 2019	Best Woman Director	Nadine Labaki	Nominated	
Asia Pacific Screen Awards	29 November 2018	Best Directing	Nadine Labaki	Won	
Asia Pacific Screen Awards	29 November 2018	Best Actor	Zain Al Rafeea	Nominated	
British Academy Film Awards	10 February 2019	Best Film Not in the English Language	Nadine Labaki, Khaled Mouzanar	Nominated	
British Independent Film Awards	2 December 2018	Best International Independent Film	Nadine Labaki, Jihad Hojeily, Michelle Keserwani, Khaled Mouzanar and Michel Merkt	Nominated	
Calgary International Film Festival	19–30 September 2018	Audience Favourite, US/International Narrative Feature	Nadine Labaki	Won	
Calgary International Film Festival	19–30 September 2018	Fan Favourite Award	Nadine Labaki	Won	
Cannes Film Festival	8–19 May 2018	Palme d'Or	Nadine Labaki	Nominated	
Cannes Film Festival	8–19 May 2018	Jury Prize	Nadine Labaki	Won	
Cannes Film Festival	8–19 May 2018	Prize of the Ecumenical Jury	Nadine Labaki	Won	
César Award	22 February 2019	Best Foreign Film	Capernaum	Nominated	
Chicago Film Critics Association	8 December 2018	Best Foreign Language Film	Capernaum	Nominated	
Cinema for Peace	3 February 2020	Cinema for Peace Award for Best Film	Capernaum	Won	
Critics' Choice Movie Awards	13 January 2019	Best Foreign Language Film	Capernaum	Nominated	
FICFA	15–23 November 2018	Best Foreign Film	Nadine Labaki	Won	
FICFA	15–23 November 2018	Audience Award	Nadine Labaki	Won	
Film Fest Gent	8–18 October 2018	North Sea Port Audience Award	Nadine Labaki	Won	
Globes de Cristal Awards	4 February 2019	Best Foreign Film	Nadine Labaki	Nominated	
Golden Globes	6 January 2019	Best Foreign Language Film	Capernaum	Nominated	
Grande Prêmio do Cinema Brasileiro	11 October 2020	Best Foreign Long Film	Capernaum	Nominated	
International Antalya Film Festival	29 September–5 October 2018	Best Actor	Zain Al Rafeea	Won	
International Antalya Film Festival	29 September–5 October 2018	Young Jury Award	Nadine Labaki	Won	
International Film Festival Rotterdam	23 January – 3 February 2019	IFFR Audience Award	Nadine Labaki	Won	
Leeds International Film Festival	1–15 November 2018	Audience Award for Best Fiction Feature	Nadine Labaki	Won	
Melbourne International Film Festival	2–19 August 2018	Audience Award	Nadine Labaki	Won	
Miami International Film Festival	11–14 October	Gigi Guermont Audience Award	Nadine Labaki	Won	
Mill Valley Film Festival	3–13 October 2018	Audience Favorite - World Cinema, Gold Award	Nadine Labaki	Won	
Norwegian International Film Festival	August 2018	Audience Award	Nadine Labaki	Won	
San Diego Film Critics Society	10 December 2018	Best Foreign Language Film	Capernaum	Runner-up	
San Sebastián International Film Festival	21–29 September 2018	Audience Award	Nadine Labaki	2nd Place	
São Paulo International Film Festival	18–31 October 2018	Audience Award	Nadine Labaki	Won	
Sarajevo Film Festival	10–17 August 2018	Audience Award	Nadine Labaki	Won	
St. Louis Film Critics Association	16 December 2018	Best Foreign Language Film	Capernaum	Nominated	
St. Louis International Film Festival	1–11 November 2018	Award for Best International Film	Nadine Labaki	Won	
Stockholm International Film Festival	7–18 November 2018	Best Screenplay	Nadine Labaki, Jihad Hojeily, Michelle Keserwany, Georges Kabbaz and Khaled Mouzanar	Won	
Stockholm International Film Festival	7–18 November 2018	Audience Award	Nadine Labaki	Won	
Vilnius International Film Festival	6 April 2019	The Audience Award	Capernaum	Won	
Washington D.C. Area Film Critics Association	3 December 2018	Best Foreign Language Film	Capernaum	Nominated	
World Soundtrack Awards	October 2019	Public Choice Award	Khaled Mouzanar	Nominated	

== See also ==
- List of submissions to the 91st Academy Awards for Best Foreign Language Film
- List of Lebanese submissions for the Academy Award for Best Foreign Language Film

== Notes ==
Capernaum is a village in the Galilee region of Israel; it was condemned by Jesus as one of the three settlements that refused to repent for its sins even after he performed miracles of healing there; in French, a capharnaüm is a place with a disorderly accumulation of objects; it is translated onscreen in this film as "Chaos."
