= Asia Pacific Screen Award for Best Performance by an Actor =

Film award category

The Asia Pacific Screen Award for Performance by an Actor is a former category in the Asia Pacific Screen Awards, between 2007 and 2021. It was retired after that, along with the Asia Pacific Screen Award for Best Performance by an Actress, both being collapsed into Asia Pacific Screen Award for Best Performance from 2022.

== Winners and Nominees ==
Winners and nominees of this award included:

=== 2000s ===
Year	Winner and nominees	English title	Original title
2007	(Turkey) Erkan Can	Takva: A Man's Fear of God	Takva,
2007	(Iran) Mehrdad Seddiqian	The Night Bus	: اتوبوس شب / Otobus-e Shab
2007	(Korea) Ryu Deok-hwan	Like a Virgin	천하장사 마돈나; / Cheonhajangsa Madonna
2007	(Russia) Evgeniy Antropov	Hard Hearted	Kremen
2007	(Israel) Sasson Gabai	The Band's Visit	ביקור התזמורת / Bikur Ha-Tizmoret
2008	(Iran) Reza Naji	The Song of Sparrows	آواز گنجشک‌ها, Âvâz-e gonjeshk-hâ
2008	(India) Rajat Kapoor	The Prisoner	Siddharth: The Prisoner
2008	(Hong Kong) Simon Yam	Sparrow	文雀 / Man Jeuk
2008	(Korea) Kim Yoon-seok	The Chaser	추격자; / Chugyeokja
2008	(Iran) Alireza Aghakhani	Before the Burial	Tanha Do Dar Zendegui Mikonim
2009	(Japan) Masahiro Motoki	Departures	おくりびと, Okuribito
2009	(China) Ge You	If You Are the One	非诚勿扰 / Fei Cheng Wu Rao
2009	(India) Naseeruddin Shah	A Wednesday	A Wednesday!
2009	(Israel) (Palestine) Mohammad Bakri	Laila's Birthday	Eid milad Laila
2009	(Korea) Yang Ik-june	Breathless	똥파리; / Ddongpari,

=== 2010s ===
Year	Winner and nominees	English title	Original title
2010	(China) Chen Daoming	Aftershock	唐山大地震 / Tángshān Dà Dìzhèn,
2010	(India) Atul Kulkarni	Natarang	नटरंग
2010	(Russia) Sergei Puskepalis	How I Ended This Summer	Как я провёл этим летом,/ Kak ya provyol etim letom
2010	(Australia) Tony Barry	Home by Christmas	
2010	(Israel) Mark Ivanir	The Human Resources Manager	שליחותו של הממונה על משאבי אנוש,/ Shliḥuto shel Ha'Memuneh al Mash'abey
2011	(China) Jiang Zhangke	Mr. Tree	Hello! Shu Xian Sheng,
2011	(Iran) Peyman Moaadi	A Separation	جدایی نادر از سیمین / odaí-e Nadér az Simín
2011	(Australia) Daniel Connors	Toomelah	
2011	(Samoa) (New Zealand) Fa'afiaula Sagote	The Orator	O Le Tulafale
2011	(Israel) Sasson Gabai	Restoration	בוקר טוב אדון פידלמן / Boker Tov, Adon Fidelman
2012	(Korea) Choi Min-sik	Nameless Gangster: Rules of the Time	범죄와의 전쟁 , Bumchoiwaui Junjaeng
2012	(India) Manoj Bajpai	Gangs of Wasseypur – Part 1	Gangs of वासेपुर
2012	(Turkey) (Greece) Tamer Levent	Beyond the Hill	Tepenin Ardi
2012	(China) Wu Tianming	Full Circle	
2012	(Israel) Lior Ashkenazi	Footnote	הערת שוליים / He'arat Shulayim,
2013	(Korea) Lee Byung-hun	Masquerade	광해: 왕이 된 남자, Gwanghae: Wang-i Doen Namja
2013	(Japan) Tatsuya Nakadai	The Japanese Tragedy	Nihon no higeki
2013	(Australia) Aaron Pedersen	Mystery Road	
2013	(Palestine) Adam Bakri	Omar	عمر
2013	(Kazakhstan) Yerbolat Toguzakov	The Old Man	Шал,/ Shal,
2014	(New Zealand) Cliff Curtis	The Dark Horse	
2014	(China) Liao Fan	Black Coal, Thin Ice	白日焰火 / Bai Ri Yan Huoi
2014	(Sri Lanka) Mahendra Perera	28	
2014	(Australia) David Gulpilil	Charlie's Country	عمر
2014	(Iran) Navid Mohammadzadeh	I'm Not Angry!	عصبانی نیستم, / Asabani Nistam!l,
2015	(Korea) Jung Jaeyong	Right Now, Wrong Then	지금은맞고그때는틀리다 / Jigeumeun-matgo-geuttaeneun-tteullida
2015	(Australia) Reef Ireland	Downriver	
2015	(Russia) Aleksei Guskov	The Find	Nakhodka
2015	(Georgia (country)) Misha Gomiashvili	The President	
2015	(China) Shide Nyima	Tharlo	
2016	(India) Manoj Bajpayee	Aligarh	
2016	(India) Nawazuddin Siddiqui	Psycho Raman	Raman Raghav 2.0
2016	(Iran) Farhad Aslani	Daughter	Dokhtar
2016	(United Kingdom) Dev Patel	Lion	
2016	(South Korea) Song Kang-ho	The Throne	사도 / Sado
2017	(India) Rajkummar Rao	Newton	
2017	(Philippines) Paolo Ballesteros	Die Beautiful	
2017	(Iran) Navid Mohammadzadeh	No Date, No Signature	Bedoune Tarikh, Bedoune Emza
2017	(Japan) Koji Yakusho	The Third Murder	Sandome no Satsujin
2017	(Palestine) Mohammad Bakri (Palestine) Saleh Bakri	Wajib	Duty
2018	(India) Nawazuddin Siddiqui	Manto	
2018	(Lebanon) Zain Al Rafeea	Capharnaüm	
2018	(Uzbekistan) Karim Mirkhadiyev	Fortitude	
2018	(Kyrgyzstan) Akylbek Abdykalykov	Night Accident	
2018	(Iran) Bahman Farmanara	Tale of the Sea	
2019	(India) Manoj Bajpayee	Bhonsle	
2019	(Israel) (Germany) Eran Naim	Love Trilogy: Chained	שלי טרילוגיה על אהבה: עיניים
2019	(Iran) Navid Mohammadzadeh	Just 6.5	
2019	(Iran) (Afghanistan) Mohsen Tanabandeh	Rona, Azim's Mother	
2019	(China) Wang Jingchun	So Long, My Son	地久天长
