= Amadou Mbow =

Senegalese actor

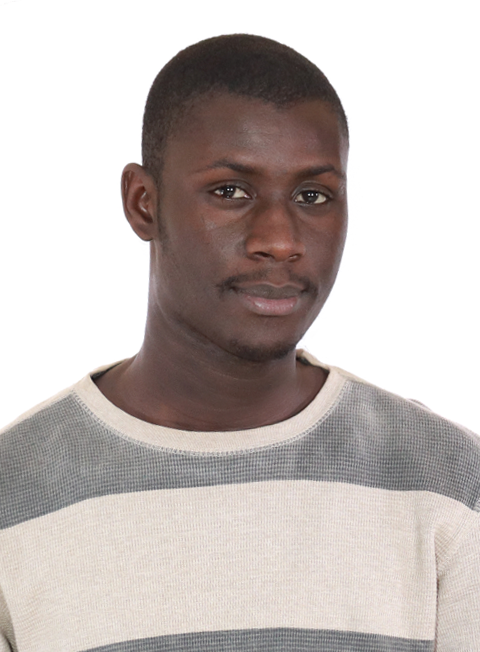
- Born: 15 May 1993 (age 31); Dakar, Senegal
- Occupation: Actor
- Years active: 2019–present

Amadou Mbow is a Senegalese actor. He is best known for the role as 'Issa' in the supernatural romantic drama film Atlantics.

== Personal life ==
Mbow was born and grew up in Dakar. The son of a Senegalese jeweler of Fulani origin from Futa, Amadou Mbow is the eldest son of his mother and the brother of three sisters. During his teenage years, basketball occupied an important place in his life. After several years of practice at DUC (Dakar University Club), he decided to quit sport to take a more interest in the audiovisual world by training himself as a self-taught person.

== Career ==
In 2019, Mbow was selected for the film Atlantics directed by Mati Diop as her first feature film. In the film, he played a young policeman 'Issa' who is sent to investigate a mysterious fire that burns through Ada's nuptial bed on her wedding night.

The film had its premier in the capital of Dakar before its release in Senegal. The film had mainly positive reviews from critics and screened at several film festivals. The film later won the Grand Prix Award at the 2019 Cannes Film Festival.

In 2020, Amadou Mbow was selected for the Césars 2020 in the “Revelations” categories.

== Filmography ==
Year	Film	Role	Genre	Ref.
2019	Atlantics	Issa	Film	
2022	Paris Memories (Revoir Paris)	Assane	Film	
2023	Unwanted	Joseph	TV Series	
