= Caramel (film) =

- Theatrical release poster
- Directed by: Nadine Labaki
- Written by: Nadine Labaki; Rodney El Haddad; Jihad Hojeily
- Produced by: Anne-Dominique Toussaint
- Starring: Nadine Labaki; Adel Karam; Yasmine Al Massri; Joanna Moukarzel; Gisèle Aouad; Dimitri Staneofski; Sihame Haddad; Aziza Semaan; Fadia Stella; Fatmeh Safa
- Cinematography: Yves Sehnaoui
- Edited by: Laure Gardette
- Music by: Khaled Mouzanar
- Production companies: Rotana Studios; Rotana TV; Sunnyland Films
- Distributed by: Rotana Studios; Rotana TV; Les Films des Tournelles & City Films Lebanon; Roissy Films (Subsidiary of Europa Corp.)
- Release dates: May 20, 2007 (Cannes); August 9, 2007 (Lebanon)
- Running time: 96 minutes
- Country: Lebanon
- Language: Lebanese Arabic
- Budget: $1.5 million
- Box office: $14.2 million

Caramel (Arabic: سكر بنات, romanized: Sukkar banat) is a 2007 Lebanese film and the feature film directorial debut of Nadine Labaki. The screenplay was co-written by Labaki with Rodney El Haddad and Jihad Hojeily. It premiered on May 20, 2007, at the Cannes Film Festival in the Directors' Fortnight section, and was nominated for the Caméra d'Or.

The story focuses on the lives of five Lebanese women dealing with forbidden love, binding traditions, repressed sexuality, aging and duty versus desire. Labaki's film does not portray Beirut as war-ravaged but as a warm and inviting locale where people deal with universal issues.

The title of the film refers to an epilation method that consists of heating sugar, water and lemon juice, Building on the theme of "sweet and salty, sweet and sour" it shows that everyday relations can be sticky but ultimately the sisterhood shared between the central female characters prevails. Caramel was distributed in over 40 countries.

== Synopsis ==
Caramel revolves around the intersecting lives of five Lebanese women. Layale works in a beauty salon in Beirut along with two other women, Nisrine and Rima. Layale is stuck in a dead-end relationship with a married man. Nisrine is no longer a virgin but is set to be married, and in her conservative family pre-marital sex is not acceptable. Rima is attracted to women. Jamale, a regular customer and wannabe actress, is worried about getting old. Rose, a seamstress with a shop next to the salon who has devoted her life to taking care of her mentally unbalanced elder sister Lili, has found her first love.

The film does not mention the political problems or warfare in Lebanon, focusing instead on everyday people with everyday problems.

== Cast ==
- Nadine Labaki as Layale
- Adel Karam as Youssef (The policeman)
- Yasmine Al Massri as Nisrine
- Joanna Moukarzel as Rima
- Gisèle Aouad as Jamal
- Sihame Haddad as Rose
- Aziza Semaan as Lili (Rose's older sister)
- Fatmeh Safa as Siham (mysterious lady with long hair to whom Rima gets attracted)
- Ismail Antar as Bassam (Nisrine's fiancé)
- Fadia Stella as Christine
- Dimitri Staneofski as Charle

== Production ==
Labaki chose to cast mostly non-professional actors.

The shooting of Caramel ended nine days before the outbreak of the Israel-Lebanon in July 2006. The film was released in Cannes a year later. An old clothes shop in the Gemmayzeh area of Beirut District was transformed into a salon where the filming of the movie took place. Caroline Labaki, Nadine's sister, was the costume designer. The music was composed by Khaled Mouzanar. Shortly after the movie release, Labaki married him.

== Reception ==
=== Critical reception ===
The film received critical acclaim. As of 31 May 2023, the review aggregator Rotten Tomatoes reported that 94% of critics gave the film positive reviews, based on 80 reviews with an average rating of 7.3/10. The website's critical consensus states, "Caramel is both an astute cultural study, and a charming comedic drama from a talented newcomer." Metacritic reported the film had an average score of 70 out of 100, based on 17 reviews, indicating "generally favorable reviews".

=== Box office ===
As of 18 May 2008, the film has grossed a little over $1 million in the US, despite its limited release. Internationally, it has amassed a little over $14 million, making it a very profitable foreign film. It was released on DVD in the United States on 17 June 2008.

== Awards and nominations ==
The film was Lebanon's official submission to the 80th Academy Awards for Best Foreign Language Film.

=== Awards ===
- Directors' Fortnight selection 2007.
- San Sebastian Film Festival Youth Award 2007.
- San Sebastian Film Festival TCM Audience Award 2007.
- San Sebastian Film Festival Sebastiane Award 2007.
- Abu Dhabi Black Pearl for Best Actress for Nadine Labaki, Yasmine Al Massri, Joanna Moukarzel, Gisele Aouad, Siham Haddad and Asiza Semaan during the Middle east International film festival 2007.
- Variety Middle East Filmmaker of the Year for Nadine Labaki during the Middle East International film festival 2007.

=== Nominations ===
- Best Feature Film, Asia Pacific Screen Awards 2007.
- Achievement in Directing for Nadine Labaki, Asia Pacific Screen Awards 2007.
- Performance by an Actress for Nadine Labaki, Yasmine Al Massri, Joanna Moukarzel, Gisele Aouad, Siham Haddad and Aziza Semaan, Asia Pacific Screen Awards 2007.
