= Anta Mbow =

Senegalese woman (born 1951)

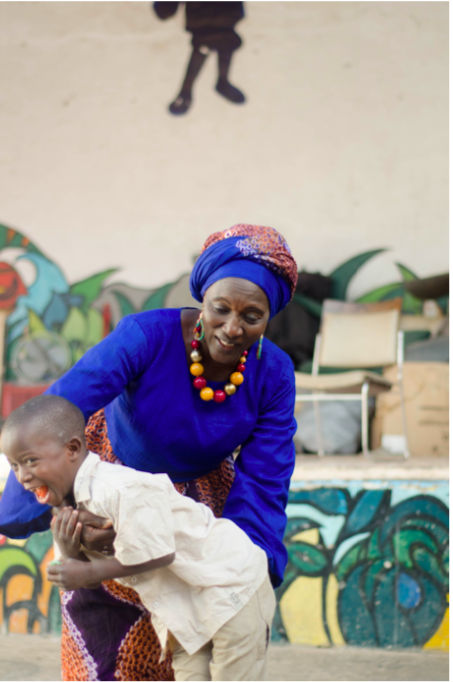
- Born: August 5, 1951 (age 74); Dakar
- Known for: Helping the children of Dakar
- Spouse: Doudou Leyti Camara
- Children: Four

Anta Mbow (born August 5, 1951) is a Senegalese woman who founded Empire des enfants to help exploited "street children" in Dakar known as Talibé. She objects to the term "street children," arguing that streets do not have children.

== Life ==
Mbow was born in Dakar in a lower-class neighborhood. She married a professional basketball player. Together, the couple went to study in France in 1972, where Mbow lived for 30 years. After receiving her education, Mbow worked as a secretary before retraining for social work.

During a visit home she was distressed to see the homeless children of Dakar. After talking with her brother Babacar Mbow and a French diplomat named Valérie Schlumberger, a plan came together to repurpose and renovate the abandoned "Empire Cinema of Dakar" as a refuge for Talibé.

Mbow returned to her home country in 2002 to help the street children of Dakar. In 2003, she created the association Empire des enfants. The charity helps boys aged between 5 and 13 who were living on the streets, facing abuse and exploitation, regardless of their ethnicity or religion. After 15 years of operation, Mbow's organization moved to a new, fully funded, 13,000 square foot facility that accommodates both boys and girls. As of 2018, the organization has helped nearly 5,000 children.

== Awards ==
- In 2013, the Orange foundation awarded her the Special Women for Change Prize and gave her work financial support.
- In 2016, Leral.net named Mbow Woman of the year.
- In 2018, Anta Mbow was awarded the World of Children Protection Award "for her efforts to significantly improve the lives of street children at risk in Dakar, Senegal."
- On July 13, 2019, Anta Mbow was raised to the rank of Knight of the French Legion of Honor by the French ambassador to Senegal in the Official Journal of the French Republic.
