= Mbowe =

Mbowe may refer to:

- Mbowe language

== People ==
- Freeman Mbowe
- Khalila Mbowe
- Khadija Mbowe

== See also ==
- Mbow (disambiguation)
