= The Gentle Indifference of the World =

2018 film

- Film poster
- Directed by: Adilkhan Yerzhanov
- Written by: Adilkhan Yerzhanov; Roelof Jan Minneboo
- Produced by: Serik Abishev; Olga Khlashcheva; Ernar Kurmashev
- Starring: Dinara Baktybaeva; Kuandyk Dyusembayev
- Cinematography: Aidar Sharipov
- Edited by: Yedige Nessipbekov; Adilkhan Yerzhanov
- Music by: Nurassyl Nuridin
- Distributed by: Cirko Film
- Release date: 17 May 2018 (Cannes)
- Country: Kazakhstan
- Languages: Kazakh, Russian

The Gentle Indifference of the World is a 2018 Kazakhstani drama film directed by Adilkhan Yerzhanov. It was screened in the Un Certain Regard section at the 2018 Cannes Film Festival.

== Cast ==
- Dinara Baktybaeva as Saltanat
- Kuandyk Dyusembayev as Kuandyk
- Kulzhamila Belzhanova as Saltanat's mother
