= Atlantics =

2019 film by Mati Diop

- Film poster
- Directed by: Mati Diop
- Written by: Mati Diop; Olivier Demangel
- Produced by: Judith Lou Lévy; Eve Robin
- Starring: Ibrahima Traoré; Mame Bineta Sane; Amadou Mbow; Nicole Sougou; Aminata Kane; Mariama Gassama; Coumba Dieng; Ibrahima Mbaye; Diankou Sembene
- Cinematography: Claire Mathon
- Edited by: Aël Dallier Vega
- Music by: Fatima Al Qadiri
- Production companies: Les Films du Bal; Cinekap; Frakas Productions; Arte France Cinéma; Canal+
- Distributed by: Ad Vitam (France); Cinéart (Belgium); Netflix (worldwide)
- Release dates: 16 May 2019 (Cannes); 2 August 2019 (Senegal); 2 October 2019 (France); 13 November 2019 (Belgium)
- Running time: 104 minutes
- Countries: France; Senegal; Belgium
- Languages: Wolof; French; English

Atlantics (French: Atlantique) is a 2019 internationally co-produced supernatural romantic drama film directed by Mati Diop, in her feature directorial debut. It was selected to compete for the Palme d'Or at the 2019 Cannes Film Festival. Diop made history when the film premiered at Cannes, becoming the first Black woman to direct a film featured in competition at the festival.

The film is centered around a young woman, Ada, and her partner, Souleiman, struggling in the face of employment, class, migration, crime, family struggles, and ghosts. Working mostly with unknown actors, Diop focused in the film on issues such as the refugee crisis, remorse, loss, grief, class struggle, and taking responsibility (or not) for one's actions. The Atlantic Ocean is used in many ways throughout the film, including as a symbol and as an engine for change, growth, life, and death.

== Plot ==
In a suburb of Dakar that lies along the Atlantic coast, a futuristic-looking tower is about to be officially opened. The construction workers have not been paid for months. One night, the workers decide to leave the country by sea, in search of a brighter future in Spain. Among them is Souleiman, the lover of Ada. However, Ada is betrothed to another man – the wealthy Omar. Ada is deeply worried about Souleiman, as she waits for news of his fate in the run-up to her wedding. On her wedding day, Omar's bed mysteriously catches fire in a suspected arson attack, and a young detective is assigned to investigate the case.

In the coming days, Ada falls under suspicion and is subjected to interrogations and a virginity test. Meanwhile, her friend Fanta and the young detective are both suffering from a mysterious illness. It slowly emerges that the spirits of the men lost at sea have returned and each night take possession of the bodies of other inhabitants of Dakar. Most of these spirits are focused on the tycoon whose withholding of their pay had forced them to go across the Atlantic. They demand their pay, threatening to burn the tower down otherwise. Once they receive their pay from the tycoon, the possessed force him to dig their graves so that their spirits may rest, but Souleiman wants only to be with Ada. Unfortunately, he has possessed the young detective, which initially scares Ada. But as she meets the other spirits, including one who possesses Fanta, she comes to understand them and spends a last night with the new Souleiman.

While reviewing footage from the wedding, the detective sees that he, under the possession of Souleiman's spirit, was the one who committed the arson. He closes the case.

== Cast ==
- Mame Bineta Sane as Ada
- Amadou Mbow as Issa
- Ibrahima Traoré as Souleiman
- Nicole Sougou as Dior
- Aminata Kane as Fanta
- Mariama Gassama as Mariama
- Coumba Dieng as Thérèse
- Ibrahima Mbaye as Moustapha
- Diankou Sembene as Mr Ndiaye
- Babacar Sylla as Omar
- Abdou Balde as Cheikh

== Reception ==
=== Critical reception ===
The review aggregator website Rotten Tomatoes reported that 95% of critics have given the film a positive review based on 155 reviews, with an average rating of 7.9/10. The website's critics consensus reads, "An unpredictable supernatural drama rooted in real-world social commentary, Atlantique suggests a thrillingly bright future for debuting filmmaker Mati Diop." On Metacritic, the film has a weighted average score of 85 out of 100 based on 30 critics, indicating "universal acclaim".

Hannah Giorgis of The Atlantic commented, "In Atlantics, the Cannes Grand Prix–winning film by the French-Senegalese director Mati Diop, the water is both a threat and a source of comfort. With soft camerawork and pointed dialogue, Diop casts a shadow over the sea and all its possibilities... The result is a transportive love story with an undercurrent of social critique that manages to be at once haunting and hopeful." K. Austin Collins writing for Vanity Fair stated, "Atlantics stuns and surprises because it tries to pull off something slippery and hard to define, a ghost story (or is it a zombie story?) that’s rooted in the material reality of Dakar and its lower classes, that’s openly political, accordingly, but which also seems flickering and unreal, alive to whatever these mysteries have in store." Bilal Qureshi of NPR said, "Atlantics is a ghost story about migration. It dramatizes the stories of the young men who leave countries like Senegal in hopes of reaching Europe, and how their absence — and their loss — haunts the women they leave behind." Jay Weissberg writing for Variety stated, "The capricious ocean is a recurrent, mesmerizing image in Mati Diop’s feature debut Atlantics, but given its perfidious connotations for the people of Senegal, who’ve lost so many souls to its depths, the director ensures the rolling waves remain hypnotic rather than beautiful. It’s the right decision for this romantic and melancholy film, more apt than some of the flawed narrative choices that frustrate though don’t compromise the atmosphere of loss and female solidarity in the story of a young woman whose love has died at sea."

Justin Chang in his review for the Los Angeles Times noted, "Drawing on a potent vein of local mythology, Diop weaves these paranormal elements into her canvas with thrift, ingenuity and bracing matter-of-factness. In her hands, a vengeful ghost seems no more absurd or irrational than, say, the futuristic high-rise tower that’s being erected on the coast." Kelsey Adams of Now gave the film four stars out of five and wrote, "Although it’s a migrant story, it focuses on those left behind. As the distressed women grapple with the departure of their men, things turn increasingly uncanny. Unexplained arson and illnesses shift Atlantics into supernatural territory, and Diop incorporates elements of Muslim mysticism and French folklore without being gimmicky. The deft blend of fantasy and drama uses supernatural elements to home in on the abundant, unjust realities the characters face." David Fear of Rolling Stone gave the film four and half stars out of five, commenting "even when things start to dip into supernatural territory, Atlantics remains oddly grounded, still dedicated to tackling a topical subject without being dogmatic. You feel as if you’re watching something that’s region-specific, yet it never makes its characters feel like “others.” Nor do you ever sense that the act of giving these often agency-less females a voice is something based in charity, because Diop makes the endeavor feel like a necessity." Namwali Serpell of The Nation stated, "In its origins in Arabian thought, a djinn can be good or bad. In its origins in the black diaspora, a zombie is a slave forced to do the bidding of others. Diop mixes the two phenomena to the same counterintuitive end: The dispossessed—male and female, management and labor—rise up not as the enemy but as the communal hero."

In her review for The Hollywood Reporter, Leslie Felperin noted, "Exquisitely shot by Claire Mathon and lushly scored by Fatima Al Qadiri, the film pulls together some exceedingly strong components [...] A lot of ideas about class, post-imperialism and spiritual values peek up out of the surface of the text, but they’re not developed with much rigor compared to what Diop conjured with more intensity and less time in A Thousand Suns." Richard Brody of The New Yorker noted, "Diop films the characters and the city with a tactile intimacy and a teeming energy that are heightened by the soundtrack’s polyphony of voices and music; she dramatizes the personal experience of public matters—religious tradition, women’s autonomy, migration, corruption—with documentary-based fervor, rhapsodic yearning, and bold affirmation." Monica Castillo of RogerEbert.com gave the film four stars out of four, commenting, "On the surface, this is a familiar story of lovers kept apart by circumstances beyond their control, but Atlantics quickly reveals itself to be so much deeper that. Diop, who co-wrote the screenplay with Olivier Demangel, blends the story with the desperation that forces them to leave home and loved ones, echoes of the refugee crisis, a look at the exploitation of the poor by the wealthy and the fetishization of virginity, purity, and marriage. The mystery of Atlantics unravels slowly, its gentle twists keep surprises hidden in plain sight."

The Guardian's Peter Bradshaw gave the film four stars out of five and wrote, "Atlantique is about the return of the repressed, or the suppressed: the men who were denied their rightful pay on the building site then faced the real possibility of a watery grave. Their spirit rises up, and this becomes a ghost story or a revenge story. Atlantique may not be perfect, but I admired the way that Diop did not simply submit to the realist mode expected from this kind of material, and yet neither did she go into a clichéd magic-realist mode, nor make the romantic story the film’s obvious centre. Her film has a seductive mystery." IndieWire's Eric Kohn gave the movie B+ grade and noted, "As it ventures further along its spellbinding path, Atlantics remains a deeply romantic work that magnetized the fears of people trapped by their surroundings and striving for the companionship that can rescue them from despair. It doesn’t quite let them get there, but Diop doesn’t strike a hopeless tone the whole way through. Ultimately, Atlantics shows how that even these bleak circumstances can have empowering ramifications for the women trapped by the shore, and why it’s a portal to a better life even if they stay put."

=== Accolades ===
At Cannes, the film won the Grand Prix. It was selected as the Senegalese entry for the Best International Feature Film at the 92nd Academy Awards, making the December shortlist.

Atlantique won Best First Feature in IndieWire's 2019 Critics Poll, and was ranked fourth in Best Foreign Film.

Former United States President Barack Obama named Atlantics among his favorite films and television series of 2019 in his annual list of favorite films, which he released on Twitter on 29 December 2019 and then on Facebook and Instagram the following day.

== Home media ==
In January 2020, it was announced that Atlantics, The Irishman, Marriage Story and American Factory would receive DVD and Blu-ray releases by The Criterion Collection.

== See also ==
- List of submissions to the 92nd Academy Awards for Best International Feature Film
- List of Senegalese submissions for the Academy Award for Best International Feature Film
