= Where Do We Go Now? =

- Poster used in Cannes 2011
- Directed by: Nadine Labaki
- Written by: Nadine Labaki; Rodney El Haddad; Jihad Hojeily; Sam Nessim
- Produced by: Anne-Dominique Toussaint
- Starring: Nadine Labaki; Layla Hakim; Claude Baz Moussawbaa; Antoinette El-Noufaily
- Cinematography: Christophe Offenstein Stills by Sam Nessim
- Music by: Khaled Mouzanar Lyrics by Tania Saleh
- Production companies: Rotana Studios; Rotana TV; Pathé; Les Films des Tournelles
- Distributed by: Front Row Filmed Entertainment and Kuwait National Cinema Company (Lebanon and Egypt); Empire International (Lebanon); Pathé (France); Eagle Pictures (Italy)
- Release dates: 16 May 2011 (Cannes); 22 September 2011 (Lebanon)
- Running time: 110 minutes
- Countries: Lebanon; France; Egypt; Italy
- Language: Levantine Arabic
- Budget: $6.7 million
- Box office: $21 million

Where Do We Go Now? (Levantine Arabic: وهلأ لوين w halla' la wayn, French: Et maintenant, on va où) is a 2011 Lebanese film directed by Nadine Labaki. The film premiered during the 2011 Cannes Film Festival as part of Un Certain Regard. It was selected to represent Lebanon for the 84th Academy Awards, but it did not make the final shortlist. The film won the People's Choice Award at the 2011 Toronto International Film Festival. It was the highest-grossing Lebanese film, and the highest-grossing Arabic film, earning $21 million worldwide, up until it was surpassed by Labaki's later film Capernaum (2018).

== Plot ==
Where Do We Go Now? tells the story of a remote, isolated, unnamed Lebanese village inhabited by both Muslims and Christians. The village is surrounded by landmines and only accessible by a small bridge. As civil strife engulfs the country, the women in the village try, by various means and with varying success, to keep their men in the dark, sabotaging the village radio, then destroying the village TV.

The story begins with a boy named Roukoz, whose job – along with his cousin, Nassim – is to venture outside the village and bring back much-needed merchandise such as soap, utensils, newspapers, light bulbs. Roukoz lives with Nassim's family, and it is made clear that Nassim has lost his father. Roukoz tries to fix the church speakers, and falls off his ladder, crashing into the cross and snapping it in half. Other characters include the village mayor and his wife Yvonne (Christians), the cafe-owner Amal (played by Nadine Labaki), Rabih (the village painter and Amal's love interest) and his sister, Issam (Nassim's brother) and his wife Aida, and the village priest and the village imam. The next day, the congregation is gathered in church to celebrate the Sunday mass. The priest preaches about the need to fix the church, and blames the broken cross on the wind, telling churchgoers to keep their cool and that their fellow Muslims have nothing to do with it. Some time later, the imam discovers that some goats have found their way into the mosque, and urges the Muslims not to blame the Christians for what had happened. As people start to gather, however, a Muslim man blames the Christians for what has happened and a small fight ensues.

The village is slowly drawn into greater violence, but the women get along beautifully and conspire together to keep their men from fighting, even hiring Ukrainian dancers to entertain their men. But as Nassim is killed in a skirmish between Christians and Muslims while on an errand in a nearby town, the women are faced with a real test of wills. In an attempt to control the situation, they drug the men by mixing hashish inside sweet pastries and remove their weapons from the village. When the men wake up, they find all the Christian women dressed in Muslim attire, and vice versa, essentially challenging their husbands and sons to hit them first if they want sectarian violence. Nassim's funeral then goes peacefully, and the movie ends with the men looking to the women for direction.

== Cast ==
- Nadine Labaki as Amal
- Claude Baz Moussawbaa as Takla
- Layla Hakim as Afaf
- Antoinette Noufily as Saydeh
- Yvonne Maalouf as Yvonne
- Saseen Kawzally as Issam
- Adel Karam as the bus driver
- Mustapha Sakka as Hammoudi
- Mustapha El Masri as Hanna

== Production ==
The shooting of Where Do We Go Now? lasted for two months from 18 October until 18 December 2010. Khaled Mouzanar, Labaki's husband, composed the music for the film. Tania Saleh wrote the lyrics to all the songs in the film. The movie was released in Cannes in May 2011.

Sam Nessim, who helped co-write the film with Labaki, shot the initial stills for the film and was set to be the director of photography at the age of 18, but he was not available during the months of production due to school, so Christophe Offenstein stepped in.

The film was shot in Taybeh, a village near Baalbek, because the town contains a church neighboring a mosque. Other towns were used during the shooting, including Meshmesh, Douma, and Jeita's Church Al-Saydeh.

== Release ==
The film was part of the official selection at the 2011 Cannes Film Festival in the Un Certain Regard parallel competition. The film was released on 14 September 2011 in France and 22 September 2011 in Lebanon, Syria and Jordan.

== Reception ==
=== Critical response ===
Where Do We Go Now? has an approval rating of 53% on review aggregator website Rotten Tomatoes, based on 76 reviews, and an average rating of 6.2/10. Metacritic assigned the film a weighted average score of 60 out of 100, based on 25 critics, indicating "mixed or average reviews".

The New York Times compared the story to Aristophanes' Lysistrata. The Australian, however, said it did not go as far as Lysistrata.

The Guardian criticised the premise that should women in the Middle East be empowered, conflict would not exist. The Globe and Mail dismissed its inability to offer real solutions to the sectarian strife. America said Labaki drew on her Maronite upbringing to go beyond feminism and make allusions to the Blessed Virgin Mary as a rallying force for the women in the film.

The Detroit News said it was disorienting and disjointed. Similarly, The San Francisco Gate said the film was "undone by its ungainly mix of heavy-handed comedy and melodrama".

== Awards and nominations ==
- Un Certain Regard official selection during Cannes 2011.
- Won the Bayard d'Or for Best Film at the 26th Festival International du Film Francophone de Namur.
- Ecumenical Special Mentions during the 2011 Cannes Film Festival.
- Won the François Chalais Prize at the 2011 Cannes Film Festival.
- Selected in the Special Presentations at the 36th Toronto International Film Festival.
- Won the People's Choice Award at the 36th Toronto International Film Festival
- Selected at the 2011 San Sebastián International Film Festival
- Won the Award To The European Film, Audience Award at the 2011 San Sebastián International Film Festival.
- Won the Byarad d'Or at the 2011 Namur Film Festival
- Won the Audience Award at the Films from the South 2011 International film festival.
- Won the Audience Award for the Best Narrative film at the 2011 Doha Tribeca Film Festival.
- Awarded Honourable Mention at 7th Pomegranate Film Festival (Toronto, Canada)
- Awarded Audience Choice Award at 7th Pomegranate Film Festival (Toronto, Canada)

== See also ==
- List of submissions to the 84th Academy Awards for Best Foreign Language Film
- List of Lebanese submissions for the Academy Award for Best Foreign Language Film
