= After Shave (film) =

- Directed by: Hany Tamba
- Written by: Hany Tamba
- Starring: Rafic Ali Ahmad, Mahmoud Mabsout, Julia Kassar, Fady Reaidy
- Release date: 2005
- Country: Lebanon
- Language: Arabic

After Shave (French: Beyrouth Après Rasage) is a 2005 Lebanese short film by the Lebanese director Hany Tamba. It won the 2006 César Awards for best short film.

== Synopsis ==
Abou Milad is an old barber who lost his hairdressing salon during the Lebanese civil war. Nowadays, he earns his crust by cutting hair in the working class cafés of Beirut. One day, he is summoned by a recluse who lives in a grand bourgeois house.

== Music ==
The film was scored by Lebanese composer Khaled Mouzanar.

== Cast ==
- Rafic Ali Ahmad as Raymond Baddar
- Mahmoud Mabsout as Abou Milad
- Julia Kassar as Samira Baddar
- Fady Reaidy as Jamil
