= Night Accident (2017 film) =

2017 film

- Film poster
- Directed by: Temirbek Birnazarov
- Written by: Temirbek Birnazarov; Numira Umuralieva
- Produced by: Gumlira Kerimova
- Starring: Akylbek Abdykalykov
- Cinematography: Kabuljan Hamidov
- Edited by: Kulchoro Sydykov; Ziregyl Kubandyk Kyzy
- Music by: Asylbek Ozubekov
- Release date: 26 November 2017 (Tallinn)
- Running time: 90 minutes
- Country: Kyrgyzstan
- Language: Kyrgyz

Night Accident is a 2017 Kyrgyzstani drama film directed by Temirbek Birnazarov. It was selected as the Kyrgyzstani entry for the Best Foreign Language Film at the 91st Academy Awards. However, it was not on the final list of submitted films released by Academy of Motion Picture Arts and Sciences in October 2018.

== Cast ==
- Akylbek Abdykalykov as Old Man
- Bayish Ismanov as Skinny
- Dina Jakob as Girl
- Elmirbek Kubatbekov as Son
- Akylbek Murataliyev as Official

== See also ==
- List of submissions to the 91st Academy Awards for Best Foreign Language Film
- List of Kyrgyzstani submissions for the Academy Award for Best International Feature Film
