= Nadine Labaki =

Lebanese actress, director and activist (born 1974)

- نادين لبكي
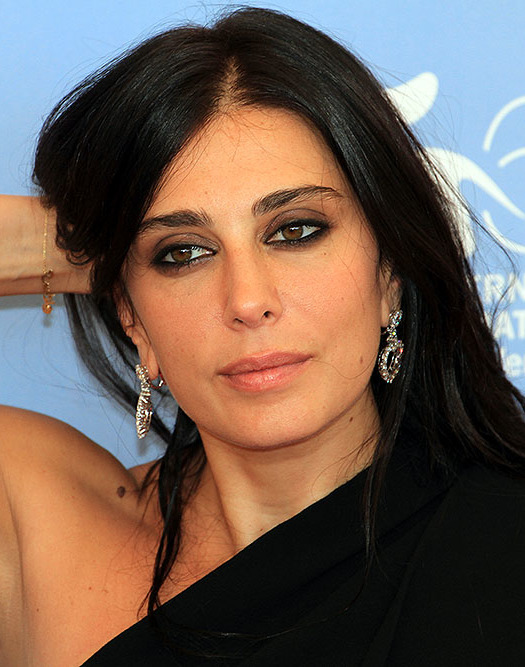
- Labaki in 2012
- Born: Nadine Antoine Labaki; February 18, 1974 (age 52); Baabdat, Lebanon
- Education: Saint Joseph University
- Occupations: Actress, director
- Years active: 1997–present
- Spouse: Khaled Mouzanar (m. 2007)
- Website: www.nadinelabaki.com

Nadine Labaki (Arabic: نادين لبكي, romanized: Nādīn Labikī; born February 18, 1974) is a Lebanese actress, director, and activist. Labaki first came into the spotlight as an actress in the early 2000s. Her filmmaking career began in 2007 after the release of her debut film, Caramel, which premiered at the Cannes Film Festival. She is known for demonstrating everyday aspects of Lebanese life and covering a range of political issues such as war, poverty, and feminism. She is the first female Arab director to be nominated for an Oscar in the category for Best Foreign Language Film for her third directorial effort, Capernaum (2018).

== Early life ==
Labaki was born in Baabdat, Mount Lebanon Governorate, Lebanon, to Maronite parents Antoine and Antoinette Labaki. Her father is an engineer, while her mother is a homemaker. She spent the first seventeen years of her life living in a war-torn environment until the Lebanese Civil War ended. She learned the art of storytelling from her uncle, who was the family hakawati (storyteller). Her grandfather owned a small theatre in Lebanon. She began her career in 1990 with Studio El Fan, the Lebanese talent show that aired from the 1970s until the early 2000s, Labaki won a prize for her direction of music video productions.

Fleeing from the war in 1989, Labaki spent three years in Montreal and obtained Canadian citizenship.

Labaki obtained a degree in audiovisual studies at the Saint Joseph University in Beirut. In 1997, she directed her graduation film, 11 Rue Pasteur, which won her the Best Short Film Award at the Biennale of Arab Cinema at the Arab World Institute in Paris. Labaki is unique among her fellow Lebanese and Arab filmmakers in that she was not educated or trained abroad.

In 1998, she attended a workshop in acting at the Cours Florent in Paris. With her sister Caroline Labaki as executive producer, she went on to direct advertisements and music videos for renowned Middle Eastern singers, for which she won several awards. Striving to portray contemporary Lebanese women, she "created examples of Lebanese women who were very at ease in their bodies."

== Career ==
=== Director ===
In 2003, Labaki began to gain popular attention in the Arab media. 2003 was also the year when she began directing music videos for singer Nancy Ajram. The song "Akhasmak ah" (Yes, I'll fight you) sparked controversy due to its scenes of sexually suggestive dancing. Ajram's female character, who serves as a waitress to male customers, was seen as inappropriate and too evocative. Labaki defended her script, stating that Ajram was actually portraying an "assertive and powerful female figure". Labaki and Ajram worked to redefine the image of the current Arab woman as feminine, alluring and in control. Ajram continued to collaborate with Labaki on her music videos "Ya Salam", "Lawn Ouyounak" and "Inta Eih". The three videos were awarded with best music video honors.

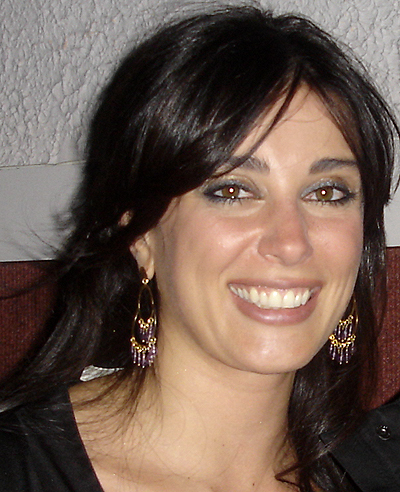
Labaki in 2007

In 2005, Labaki took part in the Cannes Film Festival Residence for six months. During that time, she wrote Caramel, her first feature film. In 2006, she directed and played one of the leading roles in Caramel, which showcases a Beirut that most people are not familiar with. Rather than tackle political issues that have plagued Lebanon, she presents a comedy that deals with five Lebanese women in Beirut who gather at a beauty salon and deal with issues related to love, sexuality, tradition, disappointment, and everyday ups and downs. The film premiered at the Directors' Fortnight at the Cannes Film Festival in 2007, which was a commercial success in the summer of that same year. It sold worldwide and collected important prizes at many festivals around the world, garnering Labaki much acclaim both as a director and actress. It also put her on Variety's 10 Directors to Watch list at the Sundance Film Festival. In 2008, the French Ministry of Culture and Communication gave her the Insignia of Chevalier in the Order of Arts and Letters.

In 2010, Labaki directed and starred in her second feature film, Where Do We Go Now? The film humorously tackles a delicate subject about a war-ravaged Middle Eastern village in which Muslim and Christian women try to keep their men from starting a religious war. The idea for this film first came about when Labaki was pregnant with her son in 2008. At that time, Lebanon was at the brink of its most violent turmoil in decades. The inter-religious conflict led to outbursts in the streets of Beirut. Labaki speaks of friends becoming enemies due to religious differences. Preparing for motherhood, she began to ponder what extreme lengths mothers would go to prevent their sons from obtaining arms and taking to the streets to fight. This one idea sparked the narrative of this film, in which an entire town of women begin a mission to prevent the men from brutally killing each other. The story takes place in Lebanon, although never explicitly stated. Labaki's reasoning for this was that "the film is universal... this conflict does not only happen in Lebanon. I see it everywhere . . . We are scared of each other as human beings." Similar to Caramel, her second feature casts non-professional actors. In effort to heighten the reality, Labaki states that "normal people deserve to be on the big screen."

The film premiered at the Cannes Film Festival in the Un Certain Regard category in 2011. The film won the Cadillac people's choice award at the Toronto International Film Festival. It also collected many other awards in festivals around the world, like Cannes Film Festival, San Sebastián International Film Festival, Stockholm Film Festival, and Doha Tribeca Film Festival. The film was also nominated for the best foreign film at the Critics Choice Awards in Los Angeles. During its opening weekend, the film hit the largest ever admissions total for an Arabic-speaking film in Lebanon, amounting to 21,475 admissions for a total of $153,358.

In late 2013, Nadine Labaki started work on her third feature film called Capernaum which was selected to compete for the Palme d'Or at the 2018 Cannes Film Festival. The film tells the story of a 12-year-old boy living in the slums of Beirut. He strives to sue his parents for bringing him into a world of suffering and negligence of children. Labaki wrote the screenplay along with Jihad Hojeily, Michelle Kesrouani, Georges Khabbaz and her husband, Khaled Mouzanar. Mouzanar further produced the film and composed the music. The title Capernaum, means 'chaos'.

For three years prior to writing, Labaki extensively researched the city's children to gather accounts of their experiences, stories and pasts. She used mostly non-professional actors for this film, including lead child actor Zain Al Rafeea, who was found in one of the slums playing with friends, a Syrian refugee himself. Although a rather anti-classical style of filmmaking, Labaki deems her system as "very organic." She strived to provide these "forgotten children" with a voice and use her cinematic tools to ignite a lasting change.

Labaki's style of cinematography uses cinematic conventions, such as illuminations, atmosphere lighting, and silence to help convey the meaning in her films. Despite the often dangerous political situations, Labaki continues to write and direct films that do not focus on conflict.

Capernaum won the Jury Prize at Cannes, and Labaki won Best Directing at the 12th Asia Pacific Screen Awards.

She was selected to be on the jury for the Un Certain Regard section of the 2015 Cannes Film Festival.

Following the success of Capernaum, Creative Artists Agency (CAA) signed Labaki in all areas, but she continues to be represented in France by Art Media Agency.

Her movie Capernaum was nominated in the foreign-language Oscars category, which was a first for a female director in 2019. She is the first female Arab director to ever be nominated for an Oscar for Best Foreign Language Film.

In collaboration with the UNHCR and UNICEF, Zain Al Rafeea and his family have been resettled in Norway. He and his siblings are attending school for the first time in their lives with a hope of regaining their childhoods. This, says Labaki, is the greatest reward.

=== Actress ===
Labaki started acting in short films during the early 2000s. She starred in Zeina Durra's The Seventh Dog. The work won the audience award at the Circuito Of Venice International Short Film Festival in 2006.

In 2006, Labaki starred in Bosta, a Lebanese musical comedy. The film was a box office success, outgrossing Harry Potter and the Goblet of Fire in Lebanon.

In the same year, Labaki acted in her first feature film, Caramel.

Labaki starred in Stray Bullet, directed by Georges Hachem in 2010.

She appears in the Moroccan production Rock The Casbah, directed by Laila Marrakchi, alongside actors Hiam Abbas and Lubna Azabal.

She has also performed in her films Where Do We Go Now? and Capernaum.

Labaki often casts herself in her movies. She feels, "When I act with the people I cast, they feel more comfortable. I like to improvise a lot, and when I am in the film, it's like directing the scene from the inside."

=== Jury ===
In 2021, she was selected as a jury member at the 11th Beijing International Film Festival for the Tiantan Awards.

== Themes and directing style ==
=== Themes ===
Growing up during the Lebanese Civil War, Labaki's films are informed by her experiences of political unrest in her home country, often exploring themes of violence and trauma.

Labaki's films challenge apathy towards important issues, such as the refugee crisis and poverty. Though themes of war and tragedy are prevalent in Labaki's works, so is humor. Her films cover the Lebanese Civil War and the lasting impacts it had on the country. Her experiences impacted Labaki personally, as well as how it shaped her film-making. As a director, she feels that she has to do something good for her country. She then decided that talking about problems such as poverty and the refugee crisis is important. FF2 Media covered a Q&A with Labaki in 2018 about her movie Capernaum, which received an Oscar nomination for Best Foreign Language Film of the Year (as well as 34 other wins and 46 other nominations). While trying to brainstorm concepts for the script, her team came up with ideas that she wanted to include, such as "child labor, migrant labor rights, children's rights, the absurdity of having to have the papers to prove that you exist, the absurdity of borders, and early marriage". She believes that "cinema can be a way to [create] change." She has stated that politics and art are intertwined and that her films are her own "way of revolt". According to Labaki, "Sometimes, a line in a film, or a scene can make you think about yourself, about your decisions. By touching your hearts, films can offer hope more than politics". Labaki's films have no solutions for the issues Lebanon faces, but she hopes that her films will "simply shake audiences out of their chronic lethargy". She has stated that her filmmaking and activism are the same, believing that cinema can effect social change.

Another common theme in her work is feminism and the female narrative. She does this by focusing on the everyday lives of women in the Middle East in her films.

=== Style ===
Labaki's films are often cast with non-professional actors. She often finds men, women, and children who live in the real neighborhoods shown on screen where they re-enact scenes from their own experiences, often in some of Beirut's grittiest slums. Labaki does this to make the film as realistic as possible. Labaki is also known for spending long periods to research and pick the cast for her films. She immerses herself in the lives of her subjects and spent four years researching her subject and the mistreated children in Beirut. For her film Capernaum, she gave her actors minimal direction and used hand-held cameras to capture life in the streets of Lebanon. For her film Caramel, she spent almost a year searching for women who resembled her characters. She purposely did not want professional actors, she explained, and the spontaneity of each authenticates the plot of women supporting each other as they cope with their problems. The filmmaker amassed months of raw footage, which she later edited down to just over two hours.

Labaki states that she was inspired by the photo of a 3-year-old Syrian refugee whose lifeless body sparked outrage around the world. Stating, "I remember thinking if this child could talk, what would he say, and how would he address the adults that killed him?" she says. "I wanted to become their voice, their vehicle for them to express themselves."

In a 2012 interview with Jan Lisa Huttner from FF2 Media, Labaki said: "I have a problem with injustice. I have a problem with seeing the wrong things around me and just not saying anything about them". She likes to address relevant issues and portray them through her art, be it acting, directing, or even dance. Her movie Where Do We Go Now? heavily incorporates dance, and in the same interview with FF2 Media, she mentioned that she has a background of being a dancer.

== Personal life ==
Labaki is multilingual, fluent in Arabic, French, English and Italian. In 2007, she married Lebanese musician and composer Khaled Mouzanar. In 2009, Labaki gave birth to her first boy, Walid. Seven years later (2016), Labaki gave birth to a daughter, Mayroun.

In 2016, Labaki received an honorary degree from the American University of Beirut and was the speaker at the 150th Commencement Ceremony.

=== Politics ===
Labaki was a candidate on the list of the new political movement Beirut Madinati for the capital's May 2016 local election. Beirut Madinati focuses on social justice and the good of the public using a diverse group of citizens as representatives.

Despite achieving about 40% of the popular vote, the movement lost against its opponent, the Beirutis' List supported by Saad Hariri, in all 6 out of 12 wards, but did not gain a single seat under the election's one-district first-past-the-post system.

== Filmography ==
=== Feature films ===
Year	English title	Original title	Notes
2007	Caramel	سكر بنات	
2011	Where Do We Go Now?	وهلأ لوين	
2018	Capernaum	كفرناحوم	Jury Prize winner at the 2018 Cannes Film Festival

=== Short films ===
- Rio, I Love You segment: O Milagre
- Homemade, Labaki directed Episode 11 of this Netflix anthology series, which features short films created by filmmakers during the COVID-19 pandemic lockdown.

=== As an actress ===
- Ramad (Ashes) – a short film by Joanna Hadjithomas and Khalil Joreige (2003)
- The Seventh Dog – a short film by Zeina Durra
- Non métrage Libanais (2003) – a short film by Wissam Smayra; Role as Nina
- Bosta – a long feature by Philippe Aractingi; Role as Alia
- Caramel or Sukkar Banat (2007) – Role as Layale
- Stray Bullet (2010) – Role as Noha
- Al Abb Wal Gharib The Father and the Foreigner (2010) by Ricky Tognazzi
- Where Do We Go Now? (2011) – Role as Amale
- Rock The Casbah (2013)
- Mea Culpa (2014)
- Rio, I Love You (2014) – Role as self
- La Rançon de la gloire (2014)
- The Idol (2015)
- Capernaum (2018) – Role as Nadine
- 1982 (2019) – Yasmine
- Costa Brava, Lebanon (2021)
- Perfect Strangers (2022)
- Swimming Home (2024)
- The Sand Castle (2024) Premiered at the Red Sea International Film Festival in December 2024 and directed by Matty Brown, revolves around a family of four stranded on an island.

Cinema for Peace awards

== Awards and nominations ==
Year	Award	Category	Nominee(s)	Result	Ref.
2020	Cinema for Peace awards	Best Film	Capernaum	Won	
2020	Bodil Awards	Best Non-American Film	Capernaum	Nominated	
2020	Danish Film Awards (Robert)	Best Non-English Language Film	Capernaum	Nominated	
2020	Guldbagge Awards	Best Foreign Film	Capernaum	Nominated	
2019	Academy Awards	Best Foreign Language Film of the Year	Capernaum	Nominated	
2019	Golden Globes	Best Motion Picture – Foreign Language	Capernaum	Nominated	
2019	BAFTA Awards	Best Film Not in the English Language	Capernaum	Nominated	
2019	Alliance of Women Film Journalists	Best Non-English Language Film	Capernaum	Nominated	
2019	Alliance of Women Film Journalists	Best Woman Director	Capernaum	Nominated	
2019	Amanda Awards, Norway	Best Foreign Feature Film	Capernaum	Won	
2019	Awards Circuit Community Awards	Best Foreign Language Film	Capernaum	Nominated	
2019	César Awards, France	Best Foreign Film	Capernaum	Nominated	
2019	FEST International Film Festival	Best Director	Capernaum	Won	
2019	Globes de Cristal Awards, France	Best Foreign Film	Capernaum	Nominated	
2019	Kinema Junpo Awards	Best Foreign Film	Capernaum	Nominated	
2019	Latino Entertainment Journalists Association Film Awards	Best Foreign Language Film	Capernaum	Nominated	
2019	Palm Springs International Film Festival	Best Foreign Language Film	Capernaum	Nominated	
2019	Rotterdam International Film Festival	IFFR Audience Award	Capernaum	Won	
2019	The Lebanese Movie Awards	Best Lebanese Director – Motion Picture	Capernaum	Won	
2019	The Lebanese Movie Awards	Best Ensemble Cast in a Lebanese Motion Picture	Capernaum	Won	
2019	The Lebanese Movie Awards	Best Writing in a Lebanese Motion Picture	Capernaum	Nominated	
2019	Vilnius International Film Festival	Best Feature Film	Capernaum	Won	
2019	Young Artist Awards	Humanitarian Award	Capernaum	Won	
2018	Adelaide Film Festival	Best Feature	Capernaum	Nominated	
2018	Antalya Golden Orange Film Festival	Best Film – Youth Jury Film Prize	Capernaum	Won	
2018	Antalya Golden Orange Film Festival	Best Film – Golden Orange	Capernaum	Nominated	
2018	Asia Pacific Screen Awards	Achievement in Directing	Capernaum	Won	
2018	British Independent Film Awards	Best International Independent Film	Capernaum	Nominated	
2018	Calgary International Film Festival	US/International Narrative Feature	Capernaum	Won	
2018	Calgary International Film Festival	Fan Favourite Award	Capernaum	Won	
2018	Cannes Film Festival	Jury Prize	Capernaum	Won	
2018	Cannes Film Festival	Prize of the Ecumenical Jury	Capernaum	Won	
2018	Cannes Film Festival	Prix de la citoyenneté	Capernaum	Won	
2018	Cannes Film Festival	Palme d'Or	Capernaum	Nominated	
2018	Festival international du cinema francophone en Acadie	Best Feature Film	Capernaum	Won	
2018	Festival international du cinema francophone en Acadie	Public Choice Award	Capernaum	Won	
2018	Ghent International Film Festival	North Sea Port Audience Award	Capernaum	Won	
2018	Melbourne International Film Festival	Best Narrative Feature	Capernaum	Won	
2018	Mill Valley Film Festival	World Cinema	Capernaum	Won	
2018	Montréal Festival of New Cinema	Peace Award	Capernaum	Won	
2018	Norwegian International Film Festival	Best Film	Capernaum	Won	
2018	Sarajevo Film Festival	Best Feature Film	Capernaum	Won	
2018	St. Louis International Film Festival	TV5MONDE Award for Best International Film	Capernaum	Won	
2018	Stockholm Film Festival	Best Screenplay	Capernaum	Won	
2018	Stockholm Film Festival	Best Film	Capernaum	Nominated	
2018	São Paulo International Film Festival	Best Feature Film	Capernaum	Won	
2018	São Paulo International Film Festival	Best Foreign Fiction	Capernaum	Won	
2017	Chicago Film Critics Association Awards	Best Foreign Language Fiction	Capernaum	Nominated	
2012	Murex D'Or	Best Lebanese Film Award	Where Do We Go Now?	Won	
2011	Cannes Film Festival	Prize of the Ecumenical Jury – Special Mention	Where Do We Go Now?	Won	
2011	Cannes Film Festival	François Chalais Award	Where Do We Go Now?	Won	
2011	Cannes Film Festival	Un Certain Regard Award	Where Do We Go Now?	Nominated	
2011	Oslo Films from the South Festival	Audience Award	Where Do We Go Now?	Won	
2011	Oslo Films from the South Festival	Silver Mirror Award	Where Do We Go Now?	Nominated	
2011	San Sebastián International Film Festival	Best European Film	Where Do We Go Now?	Won	
2011	Stockholm Film Festival	Best Script	Where Do We Go Now?	Won	
2011	Stockholm Film Festival	Best Film	Where Do We Go Now?	Nominated	
2011	Toronto International Film Festival	People's Choice Award	Where Do We Go Now?	Won	
2009	Argentinean Film Critics Association Awards	Best Foreign Film, Not in the Spanish Language	Caramel	Nominated	
2008	Dublin Film Critics Circle Awards	Best Actress	Caramel	Nominated	
2008	Dublin Film Critics Circle Awards	Breakthrough Artist	Caramel	Nominated	
2007	Asia Pacific Screen Awards	Achievement in Directing	Caramel	Nominated	
2007	Asia Pacific Screen Awards	Best Performance by an Actress	Caramel	Nominated	
2007	Cannes Film Festival	Golden Camera	Caramel	Nominated	
2007	Cannes Film Festival	C.I.C.A.E. Award	Caramel	Nominated	
2007	Oslo Films from the South Festival	Best Feature	Caramel	Won	
2007	San Sebastián International Film Festival	Audience Award	Caramel	Won	
2007	San Sebastián International Film Festival	Youth Jury Award	Caramel	Won	
2007	San Sebastián International Film Festival	Sebastiane Award	Caramel	Won	
2007	Stockholm Film Festival	FIPRESCI Prize	Caramel	Won	
2007	Paris Biennal of Arab Cinema	Best Short Film – Fiction	11 Rue Pasteur	Won	

== Other work ==
In 2014, Labaki was the goodwill ambassador for the bilingual and multimedia campaign produced by The Brave Heart Fund (BHF). Based out of the Children's Heart Center at the American University of Beirut Medical Center, the BHF creates awareness and helps to fund operations and procedures for underprivileged children with Congenital Heart Disease.
