= ÉCU The European Independent Film Festival =

Paris, France film festival

ÉCU - The European Independent Film Festival
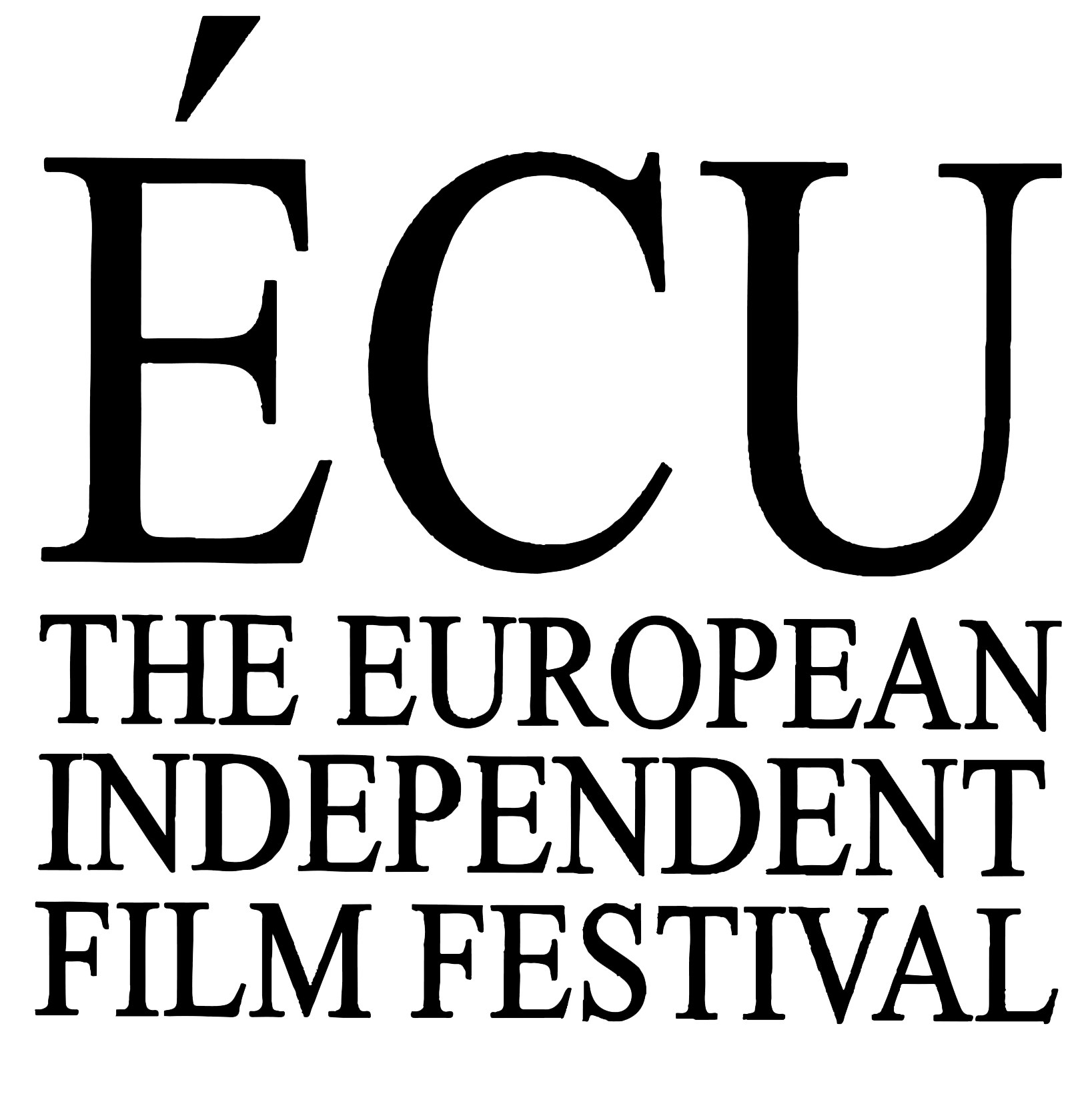
- Location: Paris, France
- Founded: 2006
- Awards received: Best European Independent Film
- Artistic director: Scott Hillier
- Language: English and French
- Website: www.ecufilmfestival.com

The European Independent Film Festival is an annual international film festival dedicated to independent cinema. Held in Paris, France, it was created in 2006 by Scott Hillier.

Quality, innovation, and creativity are judged in 14 categories, 7 of which are open to non-European filmmakers (from the Americas, Australia, Africa, and Asia), and compete for 25 awards. Jury members come from all around the globe and have a variety of backgrounds.

The founder and president of ÉCU, Scott Hillier, is a Paris-based Australian filmmaker. He gained international recognition from his cinematography, editing, writing producing and directing portfolio and served as Director of Photography on the documentary Twin Towers, which won an Academy Award in 2003.

As well as the film screenings, festival attendees can participate in a wide variety of workshops and events. Following each screening session, 'Meet-the-Directors' discussions are held in which audience members pose questions directly to the filmmakers. There is also a full program of live music hosted by ÉCU's partner Access Film-Music at the festival after-parties.

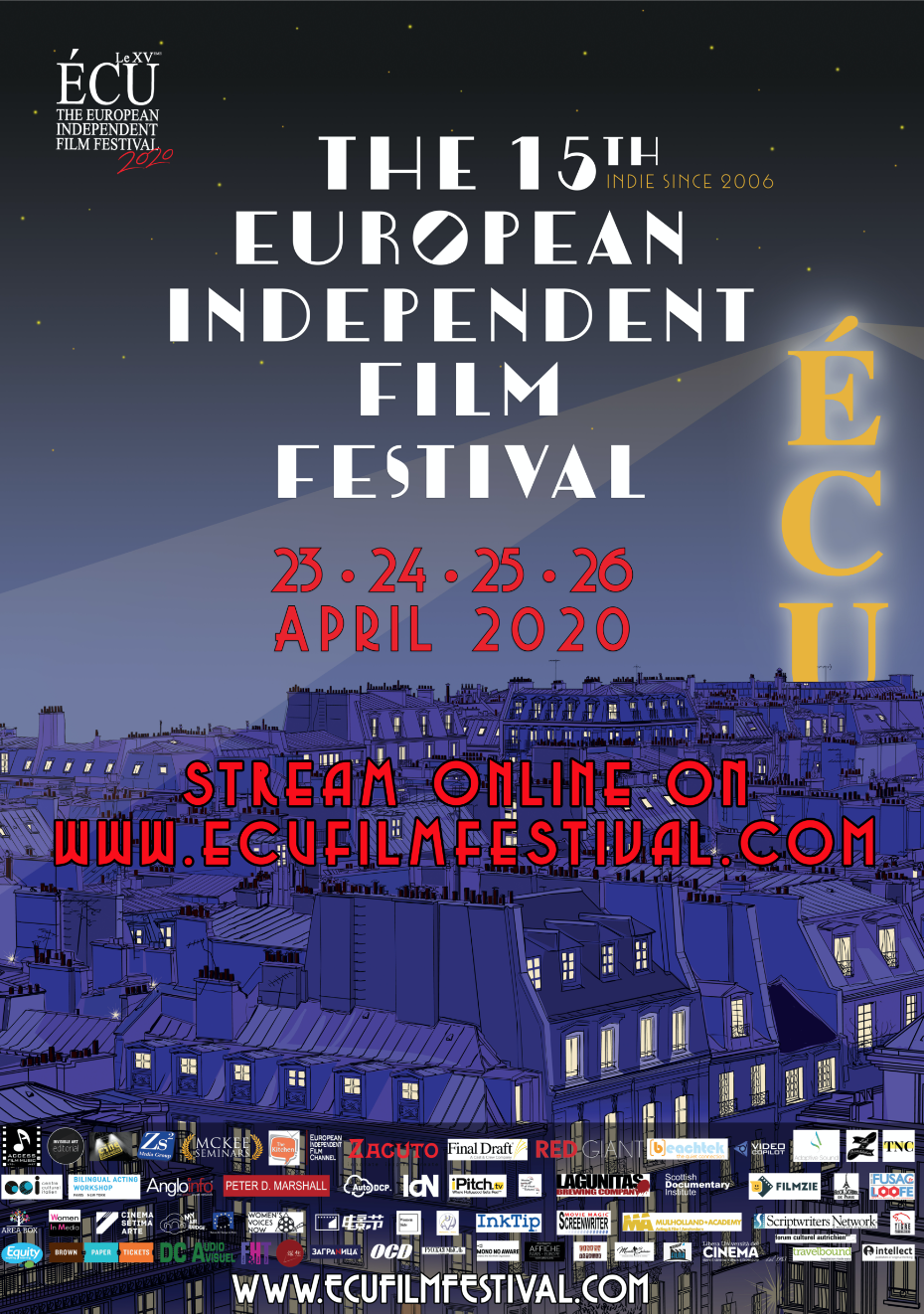
Poster for ÉCU 2020, the confinement edition

== Categories ==
The festival comprises both European and non-European films.

=== European Categories ===
- Dramatic Feature
- Dramatic Short
- Documentary
- Animated Film
- Music Video
- Experimental Film
- Comedy Film

=== Non-European Categories ===
- Dramatic Feature
- Dramatic Short
- Documentary

=== Worldwide Categories ===
- Student Film
- Much More than a Script Competition
- Arab Special Selection

== Workshops ==
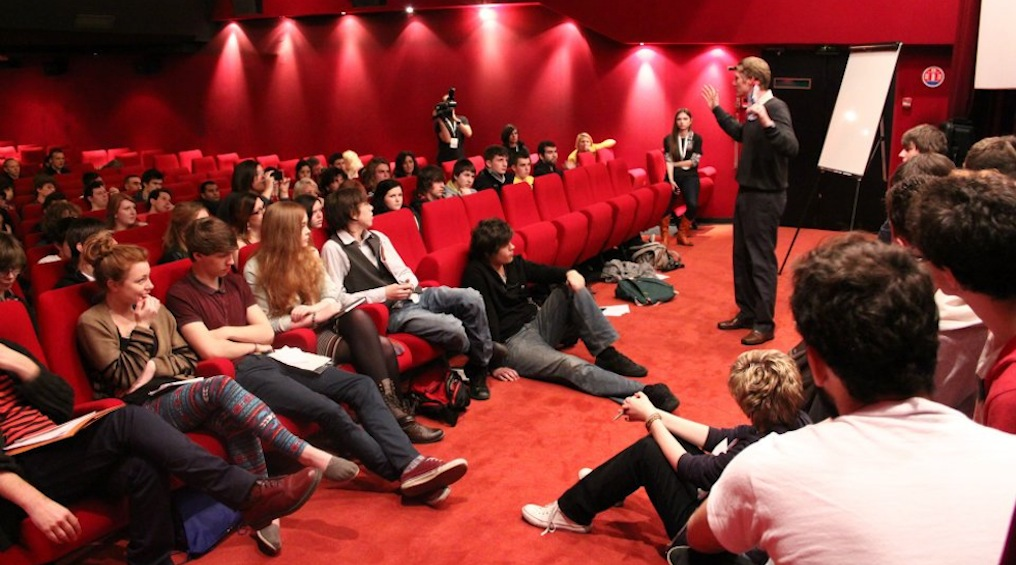
Workshops are held at every festival edition.

During the festival, workshops are available to all attendees and are conducted by professionals in the film making industry.

== Music ==
ÉCU is a strong supporter of musicians. Along the usual film festival activities, live music can be heard throughout the entirety of the weekend.

== Q&A session ==
After each screening, the audience has the opportunity to meet the directors and participate in a Question and Answer session. Where they will have the opportunity to directly ask questions to the filmmakers and to discuss in detail the difficulties and highlights of the process of film creation.

== ÉCU-on-the-road ==
Every year, the festival travels around the world making sure the "Official Selection" directors and films are made known. All this has been possible through the help of over 50 (and quickly growing) partner festivals, cultural centers and film commissions around the globe. During these events, some of the "Official Selection" films are screened, which furthers the size of the directors audience.

ÉCU-on-the-road events

| Place | date |
|---|---|
| Balinale, Indonesia | September 24–29, 2019 |
| Special Screening in Toulon, France | September 12&15, 2019 |
| Arkadia Shortfest, Romania | August 13–17, 2019 |
| Cabriolet Film Festival in Beirut, Lebanon | June 7–9, 2019 |
| Special Screening in Grand Café Bataclan | February 27, 2019 |
| ÉCU-in-Istanbul | December 24, 2018 |
| So Independent Film Festival, Bulgaria | October 26 - November 3, 2018 |
| ÉCU in Russian Indie Film Festival | October 6–7, 2018 |
| Screening in Mumbai with Alliance Française de Bombay, India | July 31, 2018 |
| ÉCU in Avanca Film Festival, Portugal | June 25–29, 2018 |
| Mt. Fuji - Atami Film & VR Festival, Japan | June 28 - July 1, 2018 |
| ÉCU-in-Viseu, Portugal | June 29–30, 2018 |
| ÉCU-in-Cannes, France | May 11–18, 2018 |
| ÉCU-in-Riga, Latvia | January 17–18, 2018 |
| Aesthetica Short Film Festival, UK | November 8–12, 2017 |
| Super8000 Film Festival, Denmark | October 27, 2017 |
| ÉCU-in-Prague, Czech Republic | October 12, 2017 |
| Naperville Independent Film Festival, US | September 23–30, 2017 |
| The Smalls Film Festival, UK | September 1–5, 2017 |
| ÉCU-in-Athens, Greece | August 30 - September 1, 2017 |
| Arkadia Shortfest, Romania | September 1–3, 2017 |
| Rural Film Festival, Spain | August 1–5, 2017 |
| Aegean Film Festival, Greece | July 25–30 |
| Craft Film Nights, Spain | July 27, 2017 |
| Cabriolet Film Festival, Lebanon | June 9–11, 2017 |
| ÉCU-in-Viseu, Portugal | June 7–9, 2017 |
| ÉCU-in-Cannes, France | May 21–27, 2017 |
| Cabriolet Film Festival, Lebanon | June 9–11, 2017 |
| Naperville Independent Film Festival, United States | September 23–30, 2017 |
| ÉCU-in-Viseu | June 7–9, 2017 |
| Vault Film Festival, UK | January 28–29, March 4–5, 2017 |
| Cinema Jam November Session, UK | November 21, 2016 |
| Aesthetica Short Film Festival, UK | November 3–6, 2016 |
| American Film Market, US | November 2– 9, 2016 |
| Evolution! Mallorca International Film Festival, Spain | November 3–12, 2016 |
| NDU International Film Festival, Lebanon | November 6–11, 2016 |
| International Short Film Festival of Cyprus, Cyprus | October 15–21, 2016 |
| Zurich Film Festival, Switzerland | September 22–October 2, 2016 |
| Arkadia ShortFest, Romania | September 2–4, 2016 |
| Naperville Independent Film Festival, US | September 10–17, 2016 |
| International Film Festival of Patmos, Greece | July 21–27, 2016 |
| Cabriolet Film Festival, Beirut, Lebanon | June 3–5 13–15, 2016 |
| NDU International Film Festival, Beirut | November 15–22, 2015 |
| Clare Valley Film Festival, Australia | November 13–15, 2015 |
| Qabila film festival, Egypt | October 8–10, 2015 |
| Tyrolean Independent Filmfestival/TyIFF, Austria | September 18, 2015 |
| Naperville Independent Film Festival, US | September 12–19, 2015 |
| ÉCU-in-Viseu, Portugal | August 13–15, 2015 |
| Arkadia Short Film Festival, Romania | July 3–5, 2015 |
| MashRome Film Festival, Italy | July 1–3, 2015 |
| ÉCU-in-Viseu, Portugal | June, 2015 |
| Clare Valley Film Festival, Australia | May 30, 2015 |
| Cabriolet Film Festival, Lebanon | May 29–31, 2015 |
| ÉCU-in-Cannes, France | May 17–24, 2015 |
| Vault Film Festival, London | February 7;14;21;28, 2015 |
| ÉCU-in-São Paulo, Brazil | January 29 – February 4, 2015 |
| ÉCU-in-Berlin, Germany | January 14–15, 2015 |

== Previous winners ==
=== ÉCU 2024 ===
The 19th ÉCU - The European Independent Film Festival took place from 19 to 21 April 2024.

| Category | Winner |
|---|---|
| Best European Independent Film 2024 | Wild Summon, Karni Arieli & Saul Freed |
| Best European Independent Dramatic Short 2024 | Bus From Adana, Jochem de Vries |
| Best European Independent Dramatic Feature 2024 | Alias Wolf, Oscar Spierenburg & Tobias Spierenburg |
| Best European Independent Documentary 2024 | AYITI, a Haitian Story Clément Beauvois, Kevin Duval, Valentin Gaffie, Alexis Pautler |
| Best European Independent Animated Film 2024 | Purga, Gintarė Valevičiūtė Brazauskienė. & Antanas Skučas |
| Best European Independent Comedy 2024 | KOEKOEK! - Jörgen Scholtens (Netherlands) |
| Best European Experimental Film 2024 | Soma, Arturo Bandinelli |
| Best European Independent Music Video 2024 | Ren – Money Game Part 3, Ren Gill & Samuel Perry-Falvey |
| Best Non-European Independent Dramatic Short 2024 | It Turns Blue, Shadi Karamroudi |
| Best Non-European Independent Dramatic Feature 2024 | X Kills Me, Ding ZiJun |
| Best Non-European Independent Documentary 2024 | Grasshopper Republic, Daniel McCabe |
| Best Student Film 2024 | Push, Anastasia Seregina |
| Best Feature Script 2024 | The Prodigal, Written by Thomas O’Malley |
| Best Short Script 2024 | Comment J’ai Perdu Mon Ongle De Pouce, Written by Siham Medjahed |
| Best Actor 2024 | They Call Me Chino, Actor: Manel Llunell |
| Best Actress 2024 | Breakfast Of Champions, Actress: Sabrina Robinson |
| Best Editing 2024 | Exit, Editor: Reza Abiyat |
| Best Cinematography 2024 | Through Gloom, Cinematographer: Milda Juodvalkytė |
| Best Director 2024 | The Moon Rises, Gaspard Vignon |
| Special Jury Mention 2024 | Dead Man Walking (DMW), Jacob Polat |
| Special Jury Mention 2024 | I C U, Vincent Zhou |
| Audience Award 2024 | John Adams. Get Up The Yard, Jose Ángel Catalán Ruiz |
| The Ahmed Khedr Award for Excellence in Arab Filmmaking 2024 | Saleh, Zaki Alabdullah |
| Excellence in Women's Filmmaking | Seize the Summit, Arwa Damon & Binnur Karaevli |

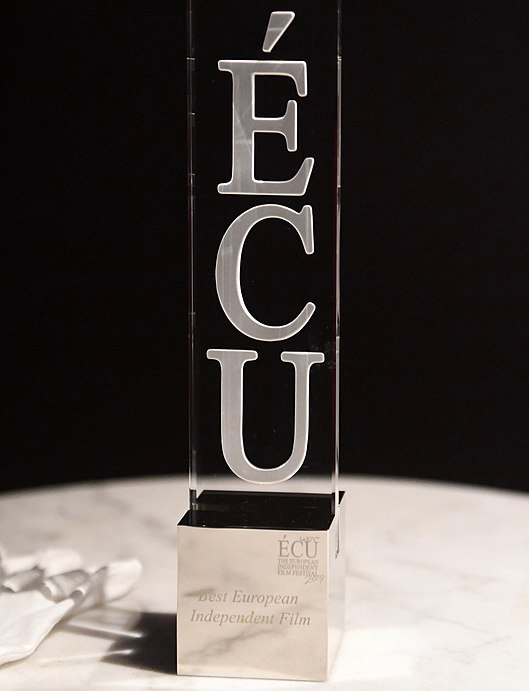
ÉCU prize 2019

=== ÉCU 2020 ===
The 15th ÉCU - The European Independent Film Festival took place from 23 to 26 April 2020. Due to COVID-19 pandemic the festival took place online, with the films being screened on the festival's website, followed by the recorded Q&A sessions with the directors.

| Category | Winner |
|---|---|
| Best European Independent Film 2020 | THE MANCHADOR - Kaveh Tehrani (Norway) |
| Best European Independent Dramatic Short 2020 | GEORGE THE DOG, REFUGEE - Tomasz Wiński (Czech Republic) |
| Best European Independent Dramatic Feature 2020 | SHIBIL - Nikola Bozadzhiev (Bulgaria) |
| Best European Independent Documentary 2020 | SHADOWS OF LIGHT - Walter Fanninger (Austria) |
| Best European Independent Animated Film 2020 | MIND MY MIND - Floor Adams (Netherlands) |
| Best European Independent Comedy 2020 | KOEKOEK! - Jörgen Scholtens (Netherlands) |
| Best European Experimental Film 2020 | THEM - Robin Lochmann (Germany) |
| Best European Independent Music Video 2020 | ADAGIO FOR STRINGS AND STORM - Ivan Yudin (Russian Federation) |
| Best Non-European Independent Dramatic Short 2020 | FUNFAIR - Kaveh Mazaheri (Iran) |
| Best Non-European Independent Dramatic Feature 2020 | The Journey of a Murder - Jun Wang (China) |
| Best Non-European Independent Documentary 2020 | AMAZING GRACE - Lynn Montgomery (US) |
| Best Student Film 2020 | MY CAT AS SOCRATES - Villő Krisztics (Hungary) |
| Best Feature Script 2020 | BRIDGE BY THE EARTHEN HOUSE - Paul Hunt (UK) |
| Best Short Script 2020 | TIME MUSEUM - Gahee Lee (US) |
| Best Actor 2020 | Chis Schultz in DORRIS 85 by Grace Philips (US) |
| Best Actress 2020 | Fatou Mbemgue in LA GITA by Salvatore Allocca (Italy) |
| Best Editing 2020 | Liu Kai Qi - BATHHOUSE DRUMMER; directed by Treey Liu (China) |
| Best Cinematography 2020 | Daniel Lindholm - ELECTRIC LITANY - SEALIGHT; directed by Sakari Lerkkanen (UK) |
| Best Director 2020 | Raúl Koler and Emiliano Sette - ANACRONTE (Argentina) |
| Special Jury Mention 2020 | CALIFORNIA ON FIRE - Jeff Frost (US) |
| Special Jury Mention 2020 | NO, I DON'T WANT TO DANCE - Andrea Vinciguerra (UK) |
| Audience Award 2020 | THE CALL CENTRE - Louisa Connolly-Burnham (UK) |
| The Ahmed Khedr Award for Excellence in Arab Filmmaking 2020 | MANARA - Zayn Alexander (Lebanon) |
| Excellence in Women's Filmmaking | THE WALKING FISH - Thessa Meijer (Netherlands) |

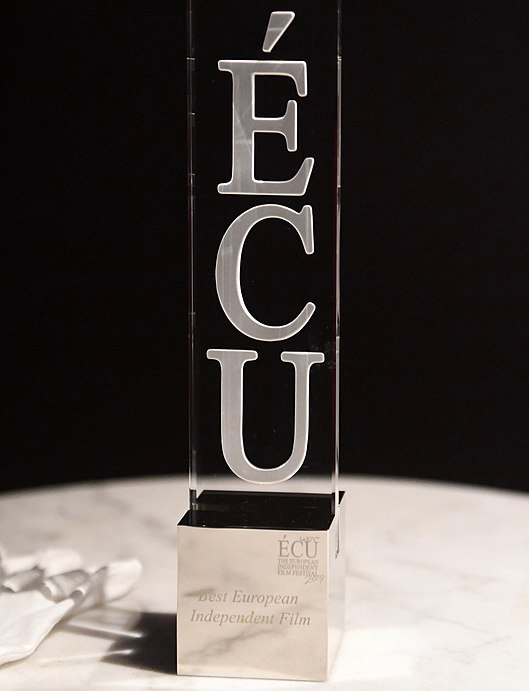
ÉCU prize 2019

=== ÉCU 2019 ===
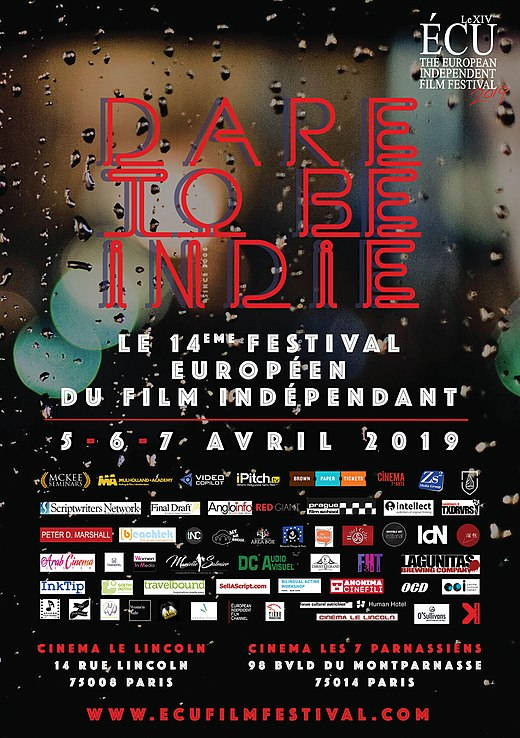
ÉCU 2019 poster

The 14th ÉCU - The European Independent Film Festival took place from 5–7 April 2019 at Cinema Les 7 Parnassiens in Paris. The participants of the festival enjoyed the screening of 79 independent films, workshops dedicated to the filmmaking industry together with #sheshoots, a discussion panel focused on women filmmakers and actresses. In addition, there was the possibility to meet the directors and asked them everything about their film. Afterparties and live music performances were organised to close every day of the festival.

The winners of ÉCU - The European Independent Film Festival 2019:

| Category | Winner |
|---|---|
| Best European Independent Film 2019 | PIGGY - Carlota Martínez Pereda (Spain) |
| Best European Independent Dramatic Short 2019 | SYDNEY - Paul Wyett (UK) |
| Best European Independent Dramatic Feature 2019 | RWANDA - Riccardo Salvetti (Italy) |
| Best European Independent Documentary 2019 | THE QUIET REBEL - Carole Cassier (France) |
| Best European Independent Animated Film 2019 | AUGENBLICKE - A BLINK OF AN EYE - Kiana Naghshineh (Germany) |
| Best European Independent Comedy 2019 | PATER FAMILIAS - Giacomo Boeri (Italy) |
| Best European Experimental Film 2019 | EL HOR - Diane Lucille Campbell (UK) |
| Best European Independent Music Video 2019 | BIRTHPLACE - Jorik Dozy, Sil van der Woerd (Netherlands, Indonesia) |
| Best Non-European Independent Dramatic Short 2019 | THE MOUSE - Liat Akta (Israel) |
| Best Non-European Independent Dramatic Feature 2019 | IN GOD I TRUST - Maja Zdanowski (Canada) |
| Best Non-European Independent Documentary 2019 | WOMEN OF THE GULAG - Marianna Yarovskaya (US) |
| Best Student Film 2019 | REVERIE - Philip Louis Piaget Rodriguez (Denmark) |
| Best Feature Script 2019 | COURTESY OF THE KAISER - Mark Larson (US) |
| Best Short Script 2019 | CLEMENT - German Perugorria Pans (Uruguay) |
| Best Actor 2019 | Mark Weinman in SEX ED by Alice Seabright (UK) |
| Best Actress 2019 | Sylvie Le Clanche in LE MAL BLEU (SICK BIRDS) by Anaïs Tellenne and Zoran Boukherma (France) |
| Best Editing 2019 | SUBMISSIO] - by Gary Coogan (Director: Savvas Stavrou) (UK) |
| Best Cinematography 2019 | THIRD KIN] - Yannis Kanakis (Director: Yorgos Zois) (Croatia, Greece) |
| Best Director 2019 | PIG HEAR] - Artjom Baranov (Germany) |
| Special Jury Mention 2019 | SKIN - Guy Nattiv (US) |
| Special Jury Mention 2019 | SALA] - Claire Fowler (UK) |
| Special Jury Mention 2019 | I LOVE MY MU] - Alberto Sciamma (UK) |
| Audience Award 2019 | EVERYTHING YOU DIDN'T SA] - Charlie Reader (UK) |
| The Ahmed Khedr Award for Excellence in Arab Filmmaking 2019 | FACES IN THE SU] - Farah Shaer (Lebanon, US) |
| Excellence in Women's Filmmaking | JOC - Andreea Valean (Romania) |

=== ÉCU 2018 ===
The 13th ÉCU - The European Independent Film Festival took place from May 4–6 at Cinema Les 7 Parnassiens in Paris. 81 films from 37 countries were screened during the 3-day festival.

During the festival weekend, international audiences were exposed to film and their filmmakers from across a spectrum of experiences, cultures, and genres. The Director Q&A sessions provided a setting for discussion between the audience and the directors on filmmaking, while after-parties throughout Paris extended these conversations into the fueled early morning hours. ÉCU endeavours to provide a cultural platform not only for entertainment but also for active networking across the independent film world. Here are the winners of ÉCU - The European Independent Film Festival 2018:

| Category | Winner |
|---|---|
| Best European Independent Film 2018 | The Box - Dusan Kastelic (Slovenia) |
| Best European Independent Dramatic Short 2018 | Wren Boys - Harry Lighton (UK) |
| Best European Independent Dramatic Feature 2018 | Merrick - Benjamin Diouris (France) |
| Best European Independent Documentary 2018 | Rezo - Leo Gabriadze (Georgia, Russian Federation) |
| Best European Independent Animated Film 2018 | Planet Tobler - Aran Quinn (Ireland, US) |
| Best Experimental Film 2018 | Plasma Vista - Harriet Fleuriot, Sara Faulker, Sarah Cockings (UK) |
| Best European Independent Music Video 2018 | The End - Loïc Andrieu (France) |
| Best European Independent Comedy 2018 | Punchline - Christophe M. Saber (Switzerland) |
| Best Non-European Independent Dramatic Short 2018 | Passion Gap - Jason Donald, Matt Portman (South Africa) |
| Best Non-European Independent Dramatic Feature 2018 | Kafou - Bruno Mourral (Haiti) |
| Best Non-European Independent Documentary 2018 | Grind - Yuri Alves (US) |
| Best Student Film 2018 | Facing Mecca - Jan-Eric Mack (Switzerland) |
| Best Short Script 2018 | Too much Bupkis - Tom Brown & Dave Jay (US) |
| Best Feature Script 2018 | The Forgotten Patron - Louise Deschamps (Canada) |
| Best Actor 2018 | Wave - TJ O'Grady Peyton (Ireland) |
| Best Actress 2018 | all For Dreams - Mami Shimazaki (Israel) |
| Best Editing 2018 | The Third Breath - Jonathan Mandel (France) |
| Best Cinematography 2018 | Mobius Bond - Narvydas Naujalis (Lithuania) |
| Best Director 2018 | #TAGGED - Martjin Winkler (Netherlands) |
| Special Jury Mention 2018 | Aquathlon - Alexey Shabarov (Russian Federation) |
| Special Jury Mention 2018 | Les Misérables - Ladj Ly (France) |
| Special Jury Mention 2018 | She'eriot - Yael Arad Zafir (Israel) |
| Special Jury Mention 2018 | Too Much Info Clouding Over My Head - Vasilis Christofilakis (Greece) |
| Audience Award 2018 | Béa - José Esteban Pavlovich Salido (Mexico) |
| The Ahmed Khedr Award for Excellence in Arab Filmmaking 2018 | Wasati - Ali Kalthami (Saudi Arabia) |
| Excellence in Women's Filmmaking | The Elephant - Suraya Raja (UK) |

=== ÉCU 2017 ===
The 12th ÉCU - The European Independent Film Festival took place from 21st to 23 April 2017 at Cinema Les 7 Parnassiens in Paris. 73 films from 28 countries were screened during the 3 day festival. In addition, the audience attended '#SheShoots - Female Filmmakers in Conversation' discussion panel.

Here are the winners of ÉCU - The European Independent Film Festival 2017:

| Category | Winner |
|---|---|
| Best European Independent Film 2017 | Cubs - Nanna Kristín Magnúsdóttir (Iceland) |
| Best European Independent Dramatic Short 2017 | Emily Must Wait - Christian Wittmoser (Germany) |
| Best European Independent Dramatic Feature 2017 | Rage - Michał Wegrzyn (Poland) |
| Best European Independent Documentary 2017 | Refugee Blues - Stephan Bookas, Tristan Daws (United Kingdom/ Germany) |
| Best European Independent Animation 2017 | Late Season - Daniela Leitner (Austria) |
| Best Experimental Film 2017 | Rhythm of Being - Giada Ghiringhelli (United Kingdom) |
| Best European Independent Music Video 2017 | I Got Myself A Finish (Tom Rosenthal) - Thomas Vernay (France) |
| Best European Independent Comedy 2017 | Le Chat Doré - Nata Moreno (Spain) |
| Best Non-European Independent Dramatic Short 2017 | A Beautiful Day - Phedon Papamichael (US) |
| Best Non-European Independent Dramatic Feature 2017 | Selling Isobel - Rudolf Buitendach (US) |
| Best Non-European Independent Documentary 2017 | El Buzo - Esteban Arrangoiz (Mexico) |
| Best Student Film 2017 | Forest of Echoes - Luz Olivares Capelle (Austria) |
| Best Short Script 2017 | Going Home - Nir Shelter (Australia) |
| Best Feature Script 2017 | Hunters Pointe - Scott Liapis (US) |
| Best Actor 2017 | Eho - Selman Jusufi (Germany) |
| Best Actress 2017 | Y - Marie Petiot (France) |
| Best Editing 2017 | Three Rooms - Andrés Klimek (Mexico) |
| Best Cinematography 2017 | Son - Leif Thomas (Germany) |
| Best Director 2017 | Ce Qui Echappe (The Elusive) - Ely Chevillot (Belgium) |
| Special Jury Mention 2017 | The Dog and the Elephant - Mike Sharpe (United Kingdom) |
| Special Jury Mention 2017 | The Bridge Over the River - Jadwiga Kowalska (Switzerland) |
| Special Jury Mention 2017 | My Last Summer - Claude Demers (Canada) |
| Audience Award 2017 | Night-Shift - Hisham Sharafeddine (Lebanon) |
| The Ahmed Khedr Award for Excellence in Arab Filmmaking 2017 | Sing For Me - Sama Waham (Canada) |
| Excellence in Women's Filmmaking | Standby - Charlotte Regan (United Kingdom) |

=== ÉCU 2016 ===
The 11th Annual ÉCU - The European Independent Film Festival took place from April 8 to 10 at Cinéma Les 7 Parnassiens, 75014 Paris. 77 films from 31 countries were screened over 3 days. Films competed across 14 categories and were judged according to their quality, creativity, and independent spirit in both form and content.

| Category | Winner |
|---|---|
| Best European Independent Film 2016 | The Chicken - Una Gunjak (Croatia/Germany) |
| Best European Independent Dramatic Short 2016 | Horseface - Marc Martinez Jordán (Spain) |
| Best European Independent Dramatic Feature 2016 | Vanitas - Oscar Spierenburg (Belgium) |
| Best European Independent Documentary 2016 | I Women in Sin] - Iris Zaki (United Kingdom/ Israel) |
| Best European Independent Animation 2016 | The Old Man and the Bird - Dennis Stein-Schomburg (Germany) |
| Best European Independent Experimental Film 2016 | Refugees - Eduardo Hernandez Perez & Hans Jaap Melissen (The Netherlands) |
| Best European Independent Music Video 2016 | Circles - Helen Takkin (Estonia) |
| Best Independent Comedy 2016 | Discipline - Christophe M. Saber (Switzerland) |
| Best Non-European Independent Dramatic Short 2016 | Thunder Road - Jim Cummings (US) |
| Best Non-European Independent Dramatic Feature 2016 | Kidnap Capital - Felipe Rodriguez (Canada) |
| Best Non-European Independent Documentary 2016 | Life on the Border - Basmeh Soleiman, Delovan Kekha, Diar Omar, Hazem Khodeideh, Mahmod Ahmad, Ronahi Ezaddin, Sami Hossein, & Zohour Saeid (Syrian Arab Iraq/Syria) |
| Best Student Film 2016 | The Van Boomel Brothers - Laurens Jans (Belgium) |
| Best Short Script 2016 | 6 September - Ionut Gaga (Romania) |
| Best Feature Script 2016 | As an Actress - Maria Hinterkörner (Austria) |
| Best Actor 2016 | Patrick's Day - Moe Dunford (Ireland) |
| Best Actress 2016 | Love/Me/Do - Rebecca Calder (United Kingdom) |
| Best Editing 2016 | The Way of Tea - Coban Beutelstetter (France) |
| Best Cinematography 2016 | The Seed - Kassim Olivier Ahmed (Belgium) |
| Best Director 2016 | The Man of my Life - Mélanie Delloye (France) |
| Special Jury Mention 2016 | Semiliberi - Matteo Gentiloni (Italy) |
| Special Jury Mention 2016 | Balcony - Toby Fell-Holden (United Kingdom) |
| Special Jury Mention 2016 | Welcome - Javier Fesser (Spain) |
| Audience Award 2016 | While You Were Away - Ben Mallaby (United Kingdom) |
| The Ahmed Khedr Award for Excellence in Arab Filmmaking 2016 | Little Gandhi - Sam Kadi (Turkey/US/Syria) |
| Excellence in Women's Filmmaking | Until 20 - Jamila Paksima & Geraldine Moriba (US) |

=== ÉCU 2015 ===
The 10th Annual European Independent Film Festival took place from April 10 to 12 at Cinéma Les 7 Parnassiens, 75014 Paris. During the 3 days screening, it showed 84 films from 32 countries and then came up with the award-winning list. This year's "ÉCU-on-the-Road", ÉCU went to São Paulo, Brazil, from January 29 to February 4; and Berlin, Germany, from January 14 to 15. Each event showcased more than 20 independent films.

| Category | Winner |
|---|---|
| Best European Independent Film 2015 | Here Lies - Duncan Ward (United Kingdom) |
| Best European Independent Dramatic Short 2015 | The Anklet - Guillaume Levil (France) |
| Best European Independent Dramatic Feature 2015 | Roseville - Martin Makariev (Bulgaria) |
| Best European Independent Documentary 2015 | Gazi to Gezi – A Stones Throw Away - Ross Domoney (United Kingdom) |
| Best European Independent Animation 2015 | Mend And Make Do - Bexie Bush (United Kingdom) |
| Best European Independent Experimental Film 2015 | Out of Reach (Rain Night) - Pablo Diartinez (Belgium) |
| Best European Independent Music Video 2015 | Entomophobia - Robin Rippmann (United Kingdom) |
| Best Independent Comedy 2015 | De Smet - Thomas Baerten & Wim Geudens (Belgium / Netherlands) |
| Best Non-European Independent Dramatic Short 2015 | Catching Fireflies - Lee Whittaker (US) |
| Best Non-European Independent Dramatic Feature 2015 | Flytrap] - Stephen David Brooks (US) |
| Best Non-European Independent Documentary 2015 | Trip Along Exodus - Hind Shoufani (Syrian Arab Republic/Lebanon) |
| Best Student Film 2015 | Exit Neverland - Chadi Abdul-Karim (Denmark) |
| Best Short Script 2015 | Long Road Home - Richard Flynn (United Kingdom) |
| Best Feature Script 2015 | The Competitors - Ruth Greenberg (United Kingdom) |
| Best Actor 2015 | Roseville - Kalin Vrachanski (Bulgaria) |
| Best Actress 2015 | Sophie at the Races - Siobhán O'Kelly (Ireland) |
| Best Editing 2015 | Being an Angel - Luigi Abanto Varese (Spain) |
| Best Cinematography 2015 | 127 - Leigh Elford (New Zealand) |
| Best Director 2015 | Before the Bomb - Tannaz Hazemi (US) |
| Special Jury Mention 2015 | Oh! My Princess - Heewook SA (Republic of Korea) |
| Special Jury Mention 2015 | The Barbiers Blade - Hakan Can (Germany) |
| Special Jury Mention 2015 | Touch - Andrew Richardson (United Kingdom) |
| Audience Award 2015 | 1 The Dandelion - Sophie-Clémentine Dubois (Belgium) |
| The Ahmed Khedr Award for Excellence in Arab Filmmaking 2015 | Amongst - Mohammed Alsalman (Saudi Arabia) |
| Excellence in Women's Filmmaking | Final Stroke - Anne Chlosta (Germany) |

=== ÉCU 2014 ===
The 9th Annual European Independent Film Festival took place from April 4 to 6 at Cinéma Les 7 Parnassiens, 75014 Paris. As well as the film screenings, festival attendees had the opportunity to participate in an array of workshops as well as a series of 'Meet the Directors' panel discussions, in which the audience pose questions directly to the filmmakers. There was also a full program of live music hosted by ÉCU's partner Access Film-Music.

| Category | Winner |
|---|---|
| Best European Independent Film 2014 | 216 Months - Valentin and Fréderic Potier (France) |
| Best European Independent Dramatic Short 2014 | Blind Squad - Vlad Fenesan (Romania) |
| Best European Independent Dramatic Feature 2014 | The Enemy Within - Yorgos Tsemberopoulos (Greece) |
| Best European Independent Documentary 2014 | Sickfuchpeople - Juri Rechinsky (Austria) |
| Best European Independent Animation | Drag Me - Nikos Kellis (Greece) |
| Best European Independent Experimental Film | Second Wind - Sergey Tsyss (Russia) |
| Best European Independent Music Video | Sandra Kolstad – Run Away - Yenni Lee (Norway) |
| Best European Independent Comedy | Great - Andreas Henn (Germany) |
| Best non-European Independent Dramatic Short 2014 | Humor - Tal Zagreba (Israel) |
| Best non-European Independent Dramatic Feature 2014 | The Preacher's Daughter - Michelle Mower (US) |
| Best non-European Independent Documentary 2014 | Not Anymore: A Story of Revolution - Matthew VanDyke (US) |
| Best Student Film | Deserted (Israel) - Yoav Hornung (Israel) |
| Best Short Script | Before The Bomb - Tannaz Hazemi and James Grimaldi (Iran) |
| Best Feature Script | Yellow Dragon and the Red Fox - Anthony Etherington (UK) |
| Best Actor | Say Nothing - Ed Stoppard (UK) |
| Best Actress | Chains of Love - Lotta Doll (Germany) |
| Best Editing | My Past Life - Sebastian Lindblad (Sweden) |
| Best Cinematography | Portraits of Mistresses - Jean-François Hensgens (France) |
| Best Director 2014 | Jiminy - Arthur Molard (France) |
| Special Jury Mention | Still Got Lives - Jan-Gerrit Seyler (Germany) |
| Special Jury Mention | Closed Box - Riccardo Salvetti, Gianfranco Boattini (Italy) |
| Special Jury Mention | You Can't Write a Letter - Guillaume Levil (France) |
| Audience Award | Battlecock! - Ben Mallaby (UK) |
| The Ahmed Khedr Award for Excellence in Arab Filmmaking | 7 Hours - Farah Alhashim (Lebanon) |

=== ÉCU 2013 ===
ÉCU 2013- The 8th Annual European Independent Film Festival took place from March 29 to March 31 and showcased 109 films from 35 countries. The festival was located at the principal cinema Les 7 Parnassiens; film screenings and professional workshops about screenwriting, directing, editing, acting, and sound mixing were held at Cinéma Action Christine. The Arab Section was held at Cinéma Lincoln.

| Category | Winner |
|---|---|
| Best European Independent Film | Othello - Hammudi Al-Rahmoun Font (Spain) |
| Best Independent Experimental Film | Kore - Eric Dinkian (France) |
| Best European Independent Comedy Film | Island Queen - Ben Mallaby (UK) |
| Best Student Film | Martha Must Fly - Ma'ayan Rypp (Israel) |
| Best Independent Music Video | I've Only Just Begun - Elias Koskimies (Finland) |
| Best Independent Animation | I am Tom Moody - Ainslie Henderson (UK) |
| Best European Independent Documentary | Moving Gracefully Towards the Exit - Jean-Bernard Andro, Patrice Regnier (France // US) |
| Best European Independent Dramatic Short | 82 - Calum Macdiarmid (UK) |
| Best European Independent Dramatic Feature | Girl Shaped Love Drug - Simon Powell (UK) |
| Best Non-European Independent Documentary | Cavedigger - Jeffrey Karoff (USA) |
| Best Non-European Independent Dramatic Feature | Motivational Growth - Don Thacker (US) |
| Best Non-European Independent Dramatic Short | Buzkashi Boys - Sam French (Afghanistan // US) |
| Ahmed Khedr Award for Excellence in Arab Filmmaking | A Tempo: The 3rd Act - Maria Abdel Karim (Lebanon) |
| Best Short Script | This Vehicle Has Been Checked for Sleeping Children - John Burdeaux (US) |
| Best Feature Script | The Last Waltz of Vienna - Brian Weakland (US) |
| The European Youth Excellence Award in Filmmaking | A Mile In Our Shoes - MFC Study Support Centre (UK) |
| Best Editing | Voices - Hussain Al-Riffaei (Bahrain) |
| Best Cinematography | The Cart - Natasha Novik (Russia) |
| Best Actor | HIOB - Uwe Preuss |
| Best Actress | Othello - Ann M. Perelló |
| Special Jury Mentions | MYRA - Caroline Burns Cooke |
| Best Director | Good Night - Muriel d'Ansembourg |
| Audience Award | I Am Eleven - Genevieve Bailey (Australia) |
| Special Jury Mentions | We Are Not Slaves - Ainur Askarov (Russia) |
| Special Jury Mentions | EAT - Moritz Krämer (Germany) |
| Special Jury Mentions | Were you the last man to see Hitler? - Caroline von der Tann (Germany // Italy) |
