= Gabriadze =

Gabriadze (Georgian: გაბრიაძე; Russian: Габриа́дзе) is a surname and may refer to:

- Levan Gabriadze (born 1969), Georgian-Russian actor and film director
- Revaz Gabriadze (1936–2021), Georgian theatre and film director, playwright, writer, painter and sculptor
