= Evolution Mallorca International Film Festival =

The Evolution Mallorca International Film Festival (EMIFF) is an annual film festival held in Mallorca, Spain. Founded in 2012 by Sandra Lipski, EMIFF originally ran in conjunction with a sister screening event in Los Angeles, but now operates solely in Mallorca.

== EMIFF Award Winners ==
=== 2021 ===
Feature Film

Best Feature Film:Spring Blossom by Suzanne Lindon (France)

Best Casting:Lucy Lenox & Pep Armengol, Pan de limón con semillas de amapola by Benito Zambrano (Spain)

Best Actress (Together/juntas):Elia Galera & Eva Martín en Pan de limón con semillas de amapola by Benito Zambrano (Spain)

Best Actor: Martín Altomaro en Los Días que no Estuve by Samuel Rios (Mexico)

Evolutionary Island Award (Best Feature Film Shot in Mallorca): Off the Rails by Jules Williamson (United Kingdom)

Documentary

International Documentary Special Mention: Yoghurt UtopiabyAnna Thomson, David Baksh (United Kingdom)

Best International Documentary: Salaryman by Alegra Pacheco (Costa Rica)

Made In Baleares Documentary Special Mention: Sonic Fantasy by Marcos Cabotá (Spain)

Best Documentary Made In Baleares: Vivir sin país (Living without a country) by Alberto Martos (Spain)

Best Documentary Short Made In Baleares: Ulisses by Joan Bover(Spain)

International Short Film

International Short film Special Mention: Caravan by William Michael Anderson (USA)

Best International Short film: On my mind by Martin Strange-Hansen (Denmark)

Best Actress International Short film: Lindsey Duncan in November 1 (United Kingdom)

Best Actor International Short film: Günter Tollar in Fabiu (Austria)

Made In Baleares

Made in Baleares Short Film Special Mention: Yo, Diablo by Baltazar Klarwein (Spain)

Best Made in Baleares Short Film:5 hours, 39 minutes, 25 secondsby Tomas Rojo, Santiago Rindel (Spain)

Special Mention Best Actress: Neus Cortés in Volatile (Spain)

Best Actress Made in Baleares Short Film: Cristina Bragoin in 5 hours, 39 minutes, 25 seconds (Spain)

Best Actor Made in Baleares Short Film: Marc Bonnin in YÉYÉ (Spain)

Experimental Short Film & Music Video

Special Mention: Casual Vignettes of Gilded Vulgarity by Paul Kaiser (USA)

Best Experimental Short Film: Water Dreams by Domingo Pablo Ortiz (Mexico)

Best Music video: Big Deal by Saskia Dixie (United Kingdom)

TVCortos Best Spanish Short Film

Imposible decirte adiós by Yolanda Centeno (Spain)

Screenplay

Best Feature Film Screenplay:Dies Ireaby Giovanni Labadessa & Lorenzo Colonna (Italy)

Best Short Film Screenplay: Anecoica by Marcos Callejo (Spain/Mallorca)

Best Evolution Island Screenplay: Hard Water by Robert Cole (Mexico)

SPECIAL AWARDS

Evolution Honorary 2021: Wim Wenders

Evolutionary 2021 (New Talent): Suzanne Lindon

=== 2020 ===
Best Experimental Short Film Exhalation, director Al Díaz (España)

Best Music video Complication, director Pere Sala Bastardes (España)

Best International Documentary Short A Syrian Women, directores: Khawla Al Hammouri, Louis Karim Sayad DeCaprio (Jordan)

Special Mention - International Documentary Short - Woman, director Raúl de la Fuente Calle (España)

Best Made In Baleares Documentary short film Running Home, director Michelle-Andrea Girouard (España)

Best Made In Baleares Documentary feature film Revealing Mario, director Simó Mateu

Special mention - Made In Baleares Documentary feature film Dorothea y el Myotragus directoras Nuria Abad, Marta Hierro

Best International Documentary Feature film Mujereando, The lament of a goddess directora Carmen Tamayo (España)

Best Short Film Screenplay Competition Pass, de Elika Abdollahi (Iran)

Best international Short Film Pa'lante, director David Van (Republica Checa)

Special Mention International Short Film: October Winds, director Heinz Köbernick (El Salvador) A complete woman, director Ceres Machado (España)

Best Actor in a MIB Short Film Lucas Nabor en GREEN SILK de la directora Marina Wagner Moll

Best Actress in a MIB Short Film Rosa Cadafalch en DONA de la directora Marga Meliá.

Best Made In Baleares - Short Film Tongue with capers, director David Mataró (España)

Special Mention MIB Short Film: La leyenda de Oriol by Rubén Jiménez Sanz, El Resort by Pedro Deltell-Colomer, Paula Galimberti y Gonzalo Piñán

Best Feature Film Screenplay Tau Emerald de Tamara Vogl (United Kingdom)

Evolutionary Island Award Baumbacher Syndrome de Gregory Kirchhoff (Aleman)

Best Actress Feature Film Andrea Sawatski en Zoro's Solo (Aleman)

Best Actor Feature Film Adrian Martinez en iGilbert, (Estados Unidos)

Special Mention Feature Film The Waiter de Steve Krikris (Grecia)

Best Feature Film Toprak de la directora Sevgi Hirschhäuser (Turkey)

=== 2019 ===
Evolution Vision 2019: Asif Kapadia

Evolutionary 2019: Lena Headey

Evolutionary 2019: Guy Nattiv

Mejor Película: 'Love cuts', de Costa Djordjevic

Mejor Director: Richard Wong, por "Come as you Are"

Mejor Actor: Grant Rosenmeyer ("Come as you are")

Mejor Actriz: Kristina Jovanovic ("Love cuts")

Mención especial: Li Jinming ("Priestess")

Mejor Guion: Barbara Daniel por "Damaged Goods"

Mejor Largometraje Documental: Gina Hole Lazarowich, por 'Krow´s Transformation"

Mención especial: Nata Moreno por "Ara Malikian: A life among strings"

Mejor Cortometraje Documental: 'Campesinos', de Matias Bolla

Mejor Cortometraje de Ficción: 'Fuck you', de Anette Sidor

Mejor Cortometraje Made in Baleares: 'Playboys', de Roxanne Paisan

Mención especial Cortometraje Made in Baleares: A-1606, de Ricard Peitx

Mejor Corto Documental Made in Baleares: 'Suitecase of madame Colette', de Joan Bonet

Mejor Vídeo Musical: Oren Lavie por "Second hand lovers" y Alina Maria Rancier por "Ay, Ay, I"

Mención especial: Alexandra Gascón por "Qué calor!"

Premio Evolutionary Island: Lene Borch Hansen y Anna Von Lowzow, por 'Joern Utzon: The man and the architect"

=== 2018 ===
BEST FEATURE FILM – BACK FOR GOOD, by Mia Spengler (GERMANY)

BEST ACTRESS – Sara Forestier, "M" (FRANCE)

BEST ACTOR – Redouanne Harjane, "M" (FRANCE)

BEST FEATURE DOC- The Silence of Others, Robert Bahar & Almudena Carracedo (SPAIN)

SPECIAL MENTION FEAYURE DOC: 'All the Women I Know' ('Todas las mujeres que conozco'), Xiana do Teixeiro, (SPAIN)

EVOLUTIONARY ISLAND AWARD - Line Hadsbjerg, 'Out of Plastic'(SPAIN, MIB)

BEST SHORT DOC MIB - 'The Most Beautiful Hell I Know' by Cesc Mulet & Pep Bonet (SPAIN, MIB)

BEST SHORT FILM MIB - 'Background', Toni Bestard (SPAIN, MIB)

BEST SHORT FILM - 'Shadow Animals', Jerry Carlsson (SWEDEN)

SPECIAL MENTION SHORT FILM: 'Facing Mecca' by de Joel Jent (SWITZERLAND)

BEST SHORT DOC- 'Globalizing Beauty', Sonja Keßler (GERMANY)

SPECIAL MENTION SHORT DOC: 'Travelogue Tel Aviv', de Samuel Patthey (SWITZERLAND)

BEST MUSIC VIDEO - 'Stereo', by Jesper Skoubølling, (SWEDEN)

SPECIAL MENTION MUSIC VIDEO - 'Be Brave' by Dominic Mercurio (USA)

BEST SHORT EXPERIMENTAL FILM - 'Hoissuru' by Armand Rovira (SPAIN, MIB)

BEST VIRTUAL REALITY SHORT FILM - 'God is One' by Michael Wall (SWEDEN)

BEST SCREENPLAY - 'The Fledgling', Tara Lynn Orr (USA)

=== 2017 ===
Best Feature Film: 'Thelma', by Joachim Trier (NOR)

Best Actor, Feature Film: Karsten Mielke for 'Dark Blue Girl' (DE)

Best Actress, Feature Film: Ella Rumpf for 'Tiger Girl' (SW)

Best Screenplay: Scott Simpson, Callie Earlene (USA)

Best Feature Documentary: 'Resistance is Life', Apo W. Bazidi (TUR, SIR, USA)

Special mention Feature Documentary: 'Grab and Run', Roser Corella (ES)

Best Short Documentary: '52-The Trolleybus', David Auerbach (AUT)

Special mention Short Documentary: 'Xavier Carbonell, The Cracked Glaze', Doménec Boronat. (ES)

Best Short Film International: 'Madre', Rodrigo Sorogoyen. (ES)

Special Mention Short Film International: 'The Transfer', Michael Grudsky (DE)

Best Short Documentary Made in Baleares: 'Kyoko', Marcos Cabotá & Joan Bover (ES)

Best Short film Made in Baleares: 'My daughter's things', Bernardo Arzayus (ES)

Special mention Best Short film Made in Baleares: 'Talia', Toni Bestard (ES)

Best Music Video: 'Coeur Croisé', Pablo Maestres (ES)

Special mention Music Video: 'Ghost', Zuzanne Plisz (POL)

Best short film experimental: 'Remission', John Charter (USA)

Best Virtual Reality short: 360° Gladiators in the Colosseum, Jörg Courtial

Evolutionary Island Award: Miquel Eek, por Vida y Muerte de un Arquitecto (ES)

Evolution Vision Award: Paul Haggis (CA)

Evolutionary Award: Pilou Asbaek (DN)

=== 2016 ===
Best Feature Film	Nino Basilia, Anna's Life
Best Balearic Short Film	Jaume Carrió, Chat vol dir moix
Best Short Film	Andrea Brusa and Marco Scotuzzi, Breath
Best Actor Feature Film	Tarek Halaby, Hotel Problemski
Best Actress Feature Film	Lilith Stangenberg, Wild
Best Documentary	David Fernández, La Llave de Dalí
Best Short Documentary (tie)	Melissa Langer, My Aleppo
Evolutionary Island Award	Dusky Paradise by Gregory Kirchhoff
Best Screenplay	Alex Iskounen, Unattractive
Best Experimental Short	Ariel Noltimier Strauss, Emily Hoffman, Emily & Ariel show
Best Music Video	Diego Gavioli, Queen of Failureland
Special Mention Documentary	Manuela Bastian, Where To, Miss?

=== 2014 ===
Best Feature Film	Love Steaks
Best Short Film	Hisha'arut (Remains)
Honorable mention Short Film	On the 7th Day
Best Actor Feature Film	Mohsin Ahmady, In between Worlds
Best Actress Feature Film	Lana Cooper, Love Steaks
Best Actor Short Film	Roberto Agostino, Piove
Best Actress Short Film	Maria Monedero, On the 7th Day
Best Cinematography	Judith Kaufmann, In between Worlds
Best Documentary	Revolution by Rob Stewart
Best Short Documentary (tie)	GirlzTalk by Christina Vestey
Best Short documentary (tie)	Should Tomorrow Be by Malini Goel
Evolutionary Island Award	Adventure Mallorca by director Andreas Eweles
Best Screenplay	Gigantic by Alan Reitsch
Honorable Mention Screenplay	Lorca by Charles Musser, co-writer Jonathan Lu

=== 2013 ===
Best Feature Film	Rezeta, Fernando Frías
Best Actor	Joāo Miguel, Xingu
Best Actress	Steffi Kühnert, Die Frau Die Sich Traut
Special mention	Aura Garrido for his work in Stockholm
Best Cinematography	Tom Fährmann, Die Frau Die Sich Traut
Best Short Documentary	Not Anymore, a Story of Revolution
Best Feature Film Documentary	No Burqas Behind Bars
Best Actor Short Film	Kaled Al Ghwairi for Ismail
Best Actress Short Film	Jeewan Adhikari, Sashi Cori, brave girl
Best Short Film	La Boda de Marta Seresesky
Best Screenplay	Vision Quest by Brian Erwin

=== 2012 ===
Best Feature Film	La Voz Dormida
Best Short Film	Buzkashi Boys
Best Documentary	I Am Eleven
Best Short Documentary	Unravel
Best Director	Benito Zambrano, La Voz Dormida
Best New Director	Ana Rodriguez Rosell, Buscabdo a Eimish
Best Actor in a Feature Film	Oscar Jaenada, Buscando a Eimish
Best Actress Feature Film	Maria Leon, La Voz Dormida
Best Actor Short Film	Luzlim Bucolli, The Return
Best Actress Short Film	Zoë Thielmans, Robyn o. (14)
Best Assemble Cast	Omamamia
Best Cinematography	Matt Wood, First Contact
Best Music	Omamamia
Best Screenplay	Amazona, Zoe Mavroudi
Best Student film	Some Things are Worse than Being Gay
Evolutionary Award	Project Happiness
