= Abroad =

2018 Lebanese film by Zayn Alexander

- Directed by: Zayn Alexander
- Written by: Pascale Seigneurie
- Starring: Zayn Alexander; Pascale Seigneurie
- Cinematography: Win Khant Maung
- Edited by: Madison Velding-VanDam
- Release date: 2 February 2018 (Santa Barbara, California)
- Running time: 10 minutes
- Countries: United States; Lebanon
- Language: Arabic

Abroad (Arabic: الغربة) is a short film directed by Lebanese filmmaker Zayn Alexander. The film made its world premiere at the 33rd Santa Barbara International Film Festival on February 2, 2018. The Moise A. Khayrallah Center for Lebanese Diaspora Studies awarded Alexander the 2020 Khayrallah Art Prize for the film.

== Plot and Themes ==
The film tells a story from the perspective of a Lebanese couple, Jad and Rania. The story starts with their shared common dream of having a successful life as actors in New York City but gradually reveals different aspects affecting their lives, which finally takes them to a point of divergence propelled by differences of opinions and decisions. In the course of ten minutes, the film explores the issue of typecasting, effects of societal expectations and the life of the struggling artist.

== Cast ==
- Zayn Alexander as Jad
- Pascale Seigneurie as Rania

== Genesis ==
In an interview with Directors Notes, Alexander said the film was based heavily on his and Seigneurie’s personal experiences and struggles of finding work in the American entertainment industry. He also added the film involved an effort to show that people, irrespective of cultural and ethnic backgrounds, are not much different.

== Receptions ==
=== Critical reception ===
The film made its debut to an American audience at the 33rd Santa Barbara International Film Festival where it received mixed to positive reviews. The introductory segment of the film, while having a resemblance to some widely familiar stereotypical terrorist plots, has received praise from critics for its apt cinematic usage. Critic Kirk Fernwood commented "Abroad can safely claim a space among well-conceived, credibly engineered, and suitably pertinent short film efforts". Critic Felix Vasquez of Cinema Crazed stated that "Abroad is a stark statement about the entertainment industry and the difficulties of minorities to achieve their dreams in an art form where they were stigmatized decades ago."

The Moise A. Khayrallah Center, which awards the annual Khayrallah Prize recognizing the artistic expressions pertaining to Lebanon and the Lebanese Diaspora, has awarded Alexander and Abroad The 2020 Khayrallah Art Prize. The selection committee considered the film to be significant in the post 9/11 era specifically for portraying the stereotypes and racism faced by Lebanese immigrants.

=== Accolades ===
Award/Festival	Year	Category	Winner/Nominee	Won
Santa Barbara International Film Festival	2018	Best Live Action Short Film	Zayn Alexander	Nominated
SOHO International Film Festival	2018	Best Showcase Short Film	Zayn Alexander	Nominated
Lebanese Film Festival	2018	Best Short Film	Zayn Alexander	Nominated
Beirut International Women Film Festival	2019	Best Short Film	Zayn Alexander	Nominated
