= Kin-dza-dza! =

- VHS cover
- Russian: Кин-дза-дза!
- Directed by: Georgiy Daneliya
- Written by: Georgiy Daneliya; Revaz Gabriadze
- Produced by: Nikolay Garo
- Starring: Stanislav Lyubshin; Yevgeni Leonov; Yury Yakovlev; Levan Gabriadze
- Cinematography: Pavel Lebeshev
- Edited by: Natalya Dobrunova
- Music by: Gia Kancheli
- Production company: Mosfilm
- Distributed by: Sovexportfilm
- Release date: 1 December 1986
- Running time: 135 minutes
- Country: Soviet Union
- Languages: Russian; Georgian

Kin-dza-dza! (Russian: Кин-дза-дза!, Georgian: ქინ-ძა-ძა!) is a 1986 Soviet film produced by the Mosfilm studio and directed by Georgiy Daneliya, with a story by Georgiy Daneliya and Revaz Gabriadze. It is a dystopian science-fiction comedy, in which two men from the Soviet Union accidentally travel through space, meeting two aliens from the Kin-dza-dza star system and their post-apocalyptic world.

== Plot ==
The story begins in 1980s Moscow. Vladimir Mashkov (not to be confused with the Russian actor with the same name), a.k.a. Uncle Vova, a construction foreman, returns home to his apartment after a stressful day at work. His wife asks him to buy some groceries, so Vova goes out to the nearest store. Standing right in the city centre on Kalinin Prospekt (now New Arbat Avenue), is a barefoot man, dressed in a tattered coat, who appeals to passersby with a strange request: "Tell me the number of your planet in the Tentura? Or at least the number of your galaxy in the spiral?"

Uncle Vova and a young Georgian student with a violin (The Violinist) stop and talk to the strange man. During a short conversation, the stranger shows them a teleportation device, which he calls a "device for moving in space". Uncle Vova decides to test the veracity of the stranger's story, and despite the stranger's warnings, presses a random button on the device. Suddenly, Uncle Vova and the Violinist find themselves transported to the planet "Pluke" in the "Kin-dza-dza" galaxy.

The natives of the planet appear human, with deceptively primitive-looking technology and a barbaric culture, which satirically resembles that of humans. They are telepathic; the only spoken words normally used in their culture are "ku" (koo) and "kyu" (kyoo), the former stands for everything good, the latter being a swear word that stands for every bad thing. However, the Plukanians are able to quickly adapt to speaking and understanding Russian and Georgian.

The society of Pluke is divided into two categories: "Chatlanians" and "Patsaks" ("пацак" is a backward spelling of "кацап", a derogatory term for Russians, or according to another opinion, from "пацан", "patsan" a young guy). The difference is ascertained only by means of a small handheld device, the "visator"; when pointed at a member of the Chatlanian group, an orange light on the device comes on; when pointed at a member of the Patsak group, a green light comes on. It is also noted that the social differences between Patsaks and Chatlanians are not constant: Pluke being a Chatlanian planet, Chatlanians are privileged, and a system of rituals must be followed by the Patsaks to show flattery; however, there are Patsak planets where Patsaks hold the upper hand and where Chatlanians are subservient. The "visator" shows that Uncle Vova and the Violinist are Patsaks.

The only group allowed to use weapons ("tranklucators") and enforce their will are the "ecilopps" ("police" spelled backwards). Outside being a Patsak or Chatlanin, respect towards others is determined by the color of their pants; different shades require those of lower social standing to "ku" at them a predetermined number of times, displaying their submission. The nominal leader of the Plukanian society is Mr. P-Zh. Everyone does their best to display fervent worship to him and disrespect is severely punished. However, when encountered in person, P-Zh appears harmless and dumb. The fuel of Pluke is called "luts" and is made from water. All naturally present water has apparently been processed into luts, so drinking water is a valuable commodity (in fact, it can only be made from luts).

A good deal of the plot is based on the fact that ordinary wooden matchsticks ("ketse") are considered to be extremely valuable on Pluke. Uncle Vova and the Violinist meet two locals, Uef and Bi, who at various points either help or abandon the Earthling duo in their quest to return to Earth, which at various times involves repairing Uef and Bi's ship or raiding P-Zh's private compound.

Eventually, the man from the film's beginning returns Uncle Vova and the Violinist back in time to the very beginning of the film. As Uncle Vova heads outside, however, there is no man at the city center; furthermore, when he runs into the Violinist there, they do not recognize each other. Suddenly, a passing tractor with a flashing, orange light reminds them of the "ecilopps", and they both reflexively squat and say, "ku!", as it was required on Pluke. They immediately recognize each other. Uncle Vova, looking at the sky, hears the sound of a song performed by Uef and Bi.

== Cast (in order of appearance) ==
- Stanislav Lyubshin as Vladimir Nikolayevitch Mashkov ("Uncle Vova")
- Galina Daneliya-Yurkova as Lyusia, Mashkov's wife
- Levan Gabriadze as Gedevan Alexandrovitch Alexidze ("Violinist")
- Anatoli Serenko as the Barefoot Wanderer from Uzm
- Yury Yakovlev as Bi the Patsak, a wandering singer
- Yevgeny Leonov as Uef the Chatlanian, a wandering singer
- Igor Khan as the one-handed smuggler
- Alexander Litovkin as the gang leader
- Valentin Bukin as black-moustached ecilop in an egg-shaped pepelats, demonstrating how a tranklucator works
- Irina Shmelyova as Tsan, the cart driver (tachanka-driving woman, a wandering singer and dancer)
- Lev Perfilov as Kyrr, the dissident Chatlanian with a tranklucator
- Nina Ruslanova as Galina Borisovna, the vice-dean
- Yuri Voronkov as bearded Chatlanian, leader of the "Children of the Sun" sect (later seen in the subway train, pretending to be a Patsak)
- Olesya Ivanova as cage-banging white sectarian woman
- Lyudmila Solodenko as sand-throwing black sectarian girl
- Vitali Leonov as Shorty (from the sect)
- Nikolai Garo as Mr. P-Zh
- Igor Bogolyubov as Mr. P-Zh's personal Patsak and grey-moustached elderly ecilop in an egg-shaped pepelats, who will want "40 chatles" and "immediately press the kappa" in a later scene
- Victor Marenkov as Patsak, wearing a coil pipe for a mask and working as watchman
- Yelena Mashkova-Sulakadze as watchman's wife (redheaded Patsak woman in the trapdoor)
- Gennady B.Ivanov as black ecilop, guarding the underground communications
- Aleksandra Dorokhina as colossal Chatlanian woman, working as attendant in the subway station
- Victor Makhmutov as the red-headed Chatlanian
- Vladimir Fyodorov as Mr. Yellow Pants
- Yelena Antonova as Mr. Yellow Pants' girlfriend
- Tatyana Novitskaya as an employee in the planetarium
- Yuri Naumtsev as the judge
- Gennady Yalovich as secret agent
- Veronica Izotova as the gang leader's female Chatlanian slave, wearing a collar
- Vladimir Razumovsky as ecilop with muzzles
- Nina Ter-Osipian as Mr. P-Zh's noble mother
- Harri Schweitz as Mr. P-Zh's 1st bodyguard (bearded fat man)
- Valentin Golubenko as Mr. P-Zh's 2nd bodyguard (long-nosed power man)
- Oleg Matveyev as Mr. P-Zh's 3rd bodyguard (young man wearing gloves)
- Olga Mashnaya as Dekont (from the planet Alpha)
- Georgiy Daneliya as Abradox (from the planet Alpha)
- Varvara Vladimirova as young Alphian mother
- Anya Andriyanova as little blonde Alphian girl

== Plukanian language ==
Since Plukanians are depicted as telepathic in the movie, they use very few spoken words to communicate. These include:

- Ketse (stress on the second syllable) – a stick that looks like a match;
- Chatl – a currency unit;
- Tsak – a small bell worn on the nose to indicate the low social status of the wearer;
- Tentura and Antitentura – two opposite parts of the Universe. Some planets and galaxies exist in Antitentura (including Earth, number 013 in the Tentura, seventh in Spiral) and some in Tentura;
- Pepelats – an interplanetary spacecraft (from the Georgian პეპელა p’ep’ela, "butterfly");
- Tsappa – a component for different machines. A "big tsappa" is a very important component for the pepelats. A "small tsapa" is a component for the gravitsappa; without the small tsappa, a gravitsappa will not work. Described as being similar to a very rusty screwnut;
- Gravitsappa – a component for the pepelats which allows intergalactic travel (from "gravity" + "tsappa");
- Tranklucator – a weapon;
- Kappa – any trigger;
- Luts or loots – the fuel used by the pepelats, originally made of water;
- Visator – a compact device which detects difference between Patsaks and Chatlanians;
- Chatlanian – a being with a high social status (detected as "orange" on a visator);
- Patsak – a being with a low social status (detected as "green" on a visator);
- Ecilopp – a policeman (from the English word "police" spelled backwards);
- Etsikh – a box for prisoners, also the imprisonment in such box (as a penalty), and also a jail with many such boxes (the word "etsikh" is from the Georgian ციხე tsikhe, "prison"). A harsher version is "etsikh with nails".
- Kyu – a socially-acceptable profanity;
- Ku (pronounced "koo") – every single other word.

== Releases ==
In 2005, RUSCICO (Russian Cinema Council) released a version with the original Russian sound and additional English and French dubbing. It also has subtitles in English and other languages.

In 2013, a digitally-restored Blu-ray version was released.

== Critical response ==
Thirty years after its original release, Little White Lies magazine described Kin-dza-dza! as "Mad Max meets Monty Python by way of Tarkovsky" and said it had remained relevant to audiences. Russia Beyond agreed that the film was still well-loved by Russians in 2016.

On 1 December 2016, Google celebrated the 30th anniversary of Kin-Dza-Dza! with a Google Doodle.

== Animated remake ==
In 2013, Daneliya released an animated remake of the film, named Ku! Kin-dza-dza! (Ку! Кин-дза-дза). The animated version was based on the plot of the original film, but was targeted more towards children and international audiences. It had a budget of 140 million rubles. Ku! Kin-dza-dza! won Best Animated Feature Film in the 2013 Asia Pacific Screen Awards. The animated remake is mainly a traditionally-animated (drawn-by-hand) feature film, with some computer animation.
