= Rezo (film) =

- Film poster
- Directed by: Leo Gabriadze
- Written by: Rezo Gabriadze
- Produced by: Timur Bekmambetov
- Cinematography: Yury Kokoshkin
- Edited by: Mariya Likhacheva
- Music by: Oleg Karpachev
- Production company: Bazelevs Company
- Release date: 23 April 2018
- Running time: 62 minutes
- Country: Russia
- Language: Russian
- Box office: RUB4.2 million

Rezo (Russian: Знаешь, мама, где я был?, romanized: Znaesh', mama, gde ya byl, lit. 'Do you know, mom, where I have been?') is a 2018 Russian animated semi-autobiographical film directed by Leo Gabriadze based on the memories and illustrations of his father, theatre and film director, writer and artist Rezo Gabriadze. Produced by the Bazelevs Company with the support of the Russian Ministry of Culture, the film had its world premiere on 23 April 2018 in the showroom and cinema halls of the GUM. The film won Best Animated Feature Film at the 12th Asia Pacific Screen Awards.

== Premise ==
The film is set in the post-World War II city of Tskaltubo, near Kutaisi. The film features sketches from the life of a ten-year-old Rezo, in whose world reality is closely intertwined with fantasies and dreams, which various historical figures, relatives, friends and enemies of Rezo inhabit.

== Release ==
The film had its world premiere on 23 April 2018 in the showroom and cinema halls of the GUM.

== Production ==
The idea for the film was conceived by Rezo in the early 1990s. Rezo made sketches of the characters, and Leo recorded the stories told by his father. They returned to the idea when Levan was already working as a director at the Bazelevs Company alongside his father. Together, with the editor Maria Likhacheva, they stitched together a complete story from the recordings. Rezo painted all the characters and decorations, which were then colored and animated.

=== Animation ===
The film is made in a mixed technique of hand-drawn animation and computer animation, where the character was divided into parts and the movements were shot frame by frame, transferring parts of the body using video cuts with Rezo Gabriadze.

== Accolades ==
- 12th Asia Pacific Screen Awards: Best Animated Feature Film (won)
- 2018 ÉCU The European Independent Film Festival: Best European Independent Documentary (won)
