= Zayn Alexandre =

Lebanese director and actor

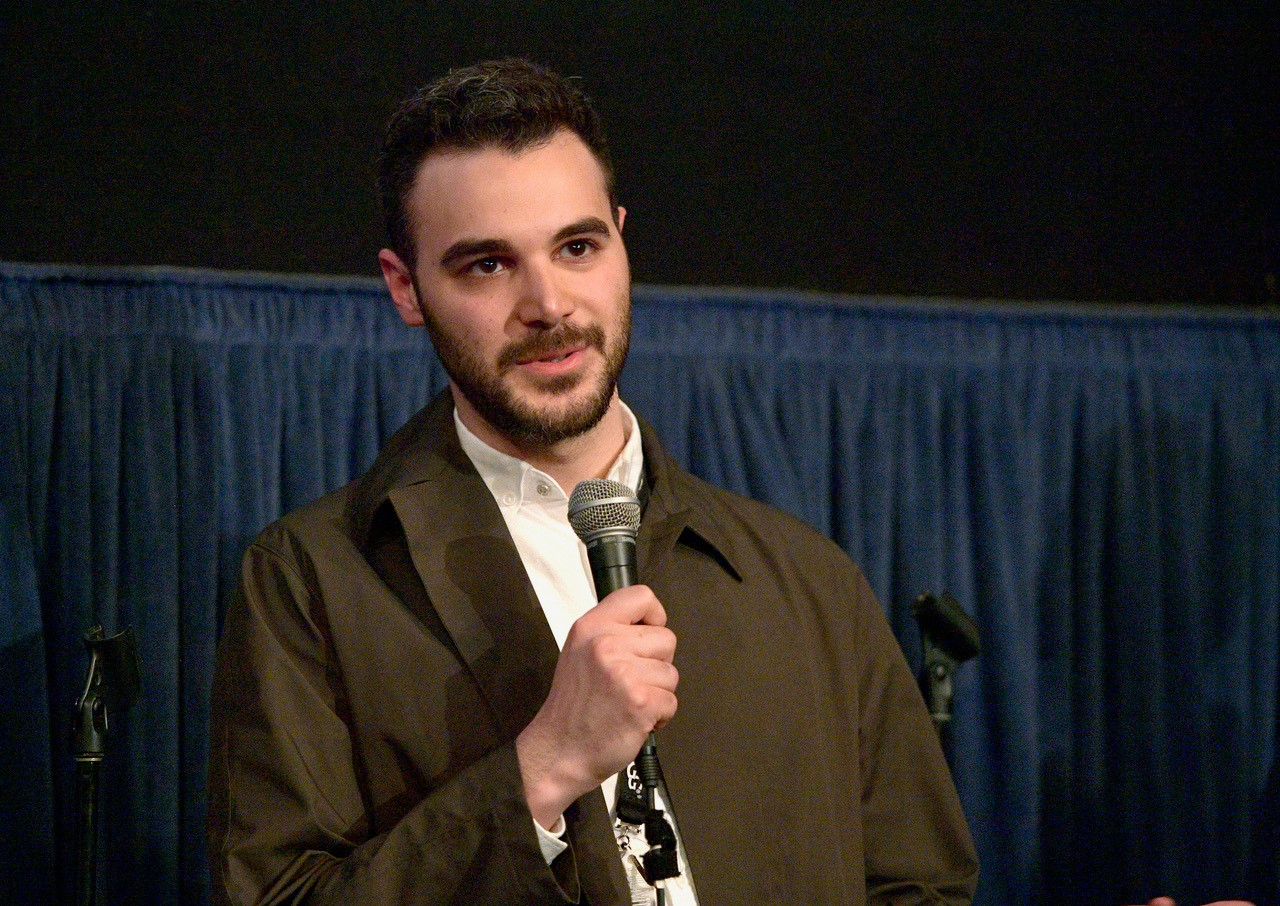
- Zayn Alexandre at the 2018 Santa Barbara International Film Festival
- Born: Beirut, Lebanon
- Alma mater: American University of Beirut; Columbia University; New York University
- Occupations: Director, Actor
- Years active: 2012 - present

Zayn Alexandre (aka Zayn Alexander) is a Lebanese American film director and actor based in New York City. He is known for his work on the short films Abroad, Manara and Saint Rose.

== Early life ==
Zayn was born and raised in Lebanon. Zayn studied psychology at the American University of Beirut and left for the United States to pursue acting in 2010.

== Career ==
In New York City, Zayn met fellow actor, Pascale Seigneurie, who would soon become a frequent collaborator. The two paired up to create Abroad, a film about a Lebanese couple pursuing their acting dreams in America and struggling with being typecast in Middle Eastern roles. Seigneurie wrote the short film, Zayn directed. The film was shot in one day. It debuted at the Santa Barbara International Film Festival in 2018. The Moise A. Khayrallah Center has awarded Zayn and Abroad The 2020 Khayrallah Art Prize.

In 2019, and Seigneurie followed up with Manara, a short film about a Lebanese funeral and a family coping with the cultural pressures of Lebanese society. Manara was filmed in Tyre, Lebanon. It debuted during the 76th Venice International Film Festival in September 2019.

A new short film titled Saint Rose was set for release in 2024, which has been selected to compete in the Shorts Competition at the Red Sea International Film Festival. The film continues Alexandre's exploration of cultural and societal themes, telling the story of a woman striving to escape a stifling marriage imposed by a conservative society.

== Filmography ==
Year	Film	Actor	Role	Writer	Director	Notes
2018	Abroad	✓	Jad		✓	Short film
2019	Manara	✓	Rami		✓	Short film
2024	Saint Rose			✓	✓	Short film
