= Gregory Kirchhoff =

German screenwriter and director

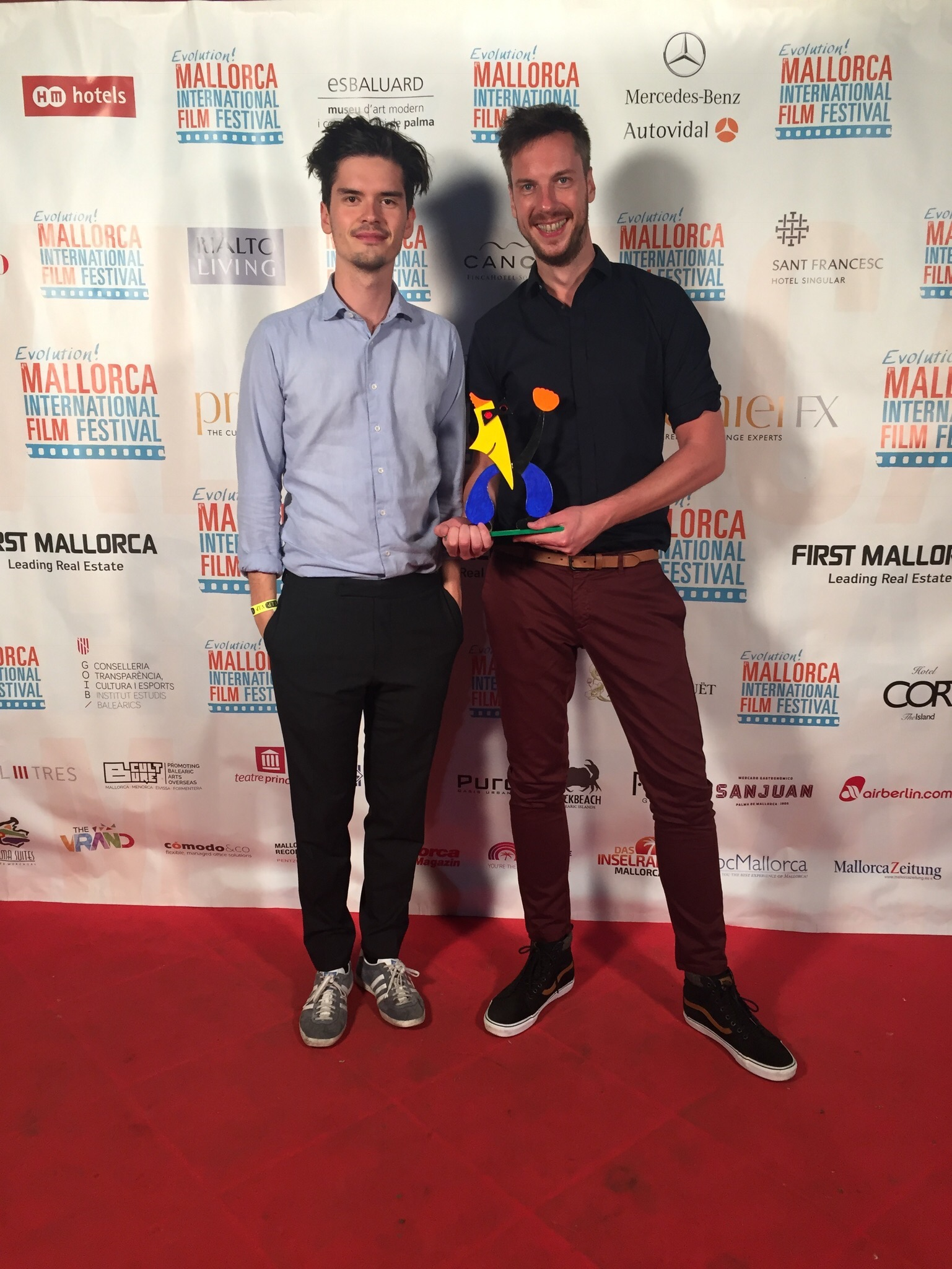
- Gregory Kirchhoff (left) at Mallorca International Film Festival
- Born: 18 June 1992 (age 34); Hamburg, Germany
- Occupations: screenwriter, director, producer

Gregory Kirchhoff (born June 18, 1992) is a German screenwriter, director and producer.

== Career ==
Kirchhoff wrote his first screenplay, Dusky Paradise, at the age of 21. He launched a crowdfunding campaign on Kickstarter in May 2014, which raised £18,450 to produce the film. In 2015, the Filmförderung Hamburg Schleswig-Holstein (de) funded the project with an additional €14,000 for post-production.

Dusky Paradise premiered at the International Festival of Independent Cinema PKO Off Camera in Krakow, as part of the main competition "Making Way" on April 29, 2016, and was nominated for the Krakow Film Award. Besides further international nominations, Dusky Paradise got nominated for the Discovery Award for best debut feature at the 2016 Raindance Film Festival and won the Evolutionary Island Award at the Evolution Mallorca International Film Festival.

Following Dusky Paradise, Kirchhoff was offered to direct the German tragic-comedy Ostfriesisch für Anfänger (de) starring Dieter Hallervorden. Although it was produced as a TV-movie the film was acquired by Universum Film and got a nationwide theatrical release. The film premiered at the 2016 Filmfest Hamburg and came to cinemas on October 27, 2016.

His third film Baumbacher Syndrome, starring Tobias Moretti opened the 53. Hof International Film Festival and premiered internationally at the Shanghai International Film Festival. In 2021, the film was released on Netflix in Germany, Austria and Switzerland and on Home Box Office in Central Europe.

In 2021, Kirchhoff was the youngest ever filmmaker to direct an episode of Tatort, Germany's longest-running, most popular TV-Drama. His Tatort: Katz und Maus (de) had 9.24 Million viewers.

== Filmography ==
- 2015: Dusky Paradise (writer, director, producer)
- 2016: Ostfriesisch für Anfänger (de) (director)
- 2019: Baumbacher Syndrome (writer, director, producer)
- 2021: Tatort: Katz und Maus (de) (director)
