= Manara (film) =

- Film poster
- Directed by: Zayn Alexander
- Written by: Pascale Seigneurie
- Produced by: ZMA Entertainment
- Starring: Zayn Alexander; Pascale Seigneurie; Hala Basma Safieddine
- Cinematography: Aron Meinhardt
- Edited by: Stephanie Nassar
- Distributed by: Premiere Film (International); MAD Solutions (Arab world)
- Release date: 4 September 2019 (Venice)
- Running time: 15 minutes
- Country: Lebanon

Manara (Arabic: منارة) is the second short film directed by Lebanese filmmaker Zayn Alexander. It premiered in 2019 during the 76th Venice International Film Festival in the Giornate degli Autori section. The film was awarded the top prize at the 5th annual Laguna Sud - Il Cinema fuori dal Palazzo by a jury that included director Paola Randi, director of photography Valerio Azzali, and writer Franceso Targhetta. It went on to win the "Ahmed Khedr Award for Excellence in Arab Filmmaking" at the 2020 ÉCU The European Independent Film Festival and "Best Narrative Short Film" at the 2020 Alexandria Short Film Festival in Egypt.

== Plot ==
In a coastal town in Southern Lebanon, the Zayyad family owned a hotel by the sea. Following the death of the father, the mother, Alia, intends to conceal the cause of death to maintain the family's reputation. Her adult children, Rami and Noura, object to this decision. One hour before mourners arrive, the three family members discuss their decision and their family dynamic.

== Cast ==
- Zayn Alexander as Rami
- Pascale Seigneurie as Noura
- Hala Basma Safieddine as Alia

== Themes ==
Alexander said he made the film to explore "the obsession with appearances in Lebanon" and "the lengths Lebanese families are willing to go to avoid embarrassment." Alexander and the film's writer, Seigneurie, who also co-stars, said the film's development was guided by their deep-rooted frustration with the psychological attitudes of the culture they grew up in. The film explores the stigma of mental health issues in Lebanon and the generational divide when it comes to mental health, grief, and family. Alexander, who has a master's degree in psychology from Columbia University, wanted to explore the tensions families go through as they struggle with secrecy and shame.

== Production ==
The bulk of the film was shot in two days in Tyre, Lebanon at the resort of Al Fanar. It is Alexander's second short film working with writer and actor Pascale Seigneurie, following their collaboration on Alexander's directorial debut Abroad (2018).

== Reception ==
=== Critical reception ===
The film debuted in Venice, Italy before appearing at festivals in Tunisia, France, and Egypt, winning several jury awards. The film received mostly positive reviews by critics at each stop along its festival tour. Lorna Codrai of Film Inquiry wrote that the film "does a wonderful job of examining a culture struggling with an increasing mental health crisis." Bianca Garner of In Their Own League wrote Manara is "a perfect example of how to carefully construct a short film narrative." Film critic Mazen Fawzy wrote that Manara is "a powerful film that successfully implicates the viewer and leaves room for varying interpretations." Adam Symchuk of Asian Movie Pulse gave the film a mixed review, but wrote "its strengths are still enough to put the short in high regard, and establishes director Zayn Alexander as a strong narrative storyteller."

=== Accolades ===
Award/Festival	Category	Winner/Nominee	Won
BCT - Festival Nazionale del Cinema e della Televisione - Città di Benevento (2020)	Best Short Film	Zayn Alexander	Nominated
Alexandria Short Film Festival (2020)	Best Narrative Short Film	Zayn Alexander	Won
ÉCU The European Independent Film Festival (2020)	Ahmed Khedr Award for Excellence in Arab Filmmaking	Zayn Alexander	Won
Carthage Film Festival (2019)	Golden Tanit (Tanit d'Or) for Best Short Film	Zayn Alexander	Nominated
Laguna Sud - Il Cinema fuori dal Palazzo (2019)	Best Short Film	Zayn Alexander	Won
River Film Festival, Italy (2020)	PREMIO SPECIALE DEL PUBBLICO	Zayn Alexander	Nominated
Elba Film Festival (2020)	Best Actor	Zayn Alexander	Won
Lonely Wolf: London International Film Festival (2020)	Best Foreign Film	Zayn Alexander	Won
Hollywood Reel Independent Film Festival (2021)	Best Short Film	Zayn Alexander	Won
