= Akram Fouad Khater =

American historian

- أكرم فؤاد خاطر
- Born: December 3, 1960 (age 65); Lebanon
- Education: University of California, Santa Cruz, University of California, Berkeley
- Occupations: Professor, historian, author
- Known for: Lebanese Diaspora Studies, Lebanese Studies

Akram Fouad Khater (Arabic: أكرم فؤاد خاطر; born December 3, 1960) is a Lebanese-born American professor, historian, and author. He serves as a professor of history, and the director of the Moise A. Khayrallah Center for Lebanese Diaspora Studies at North Carolina State University (NCSU). He specializes in the history of Lebanon, Lebanese Studies and diaspora, the Middle Eastern history, and Arab relations.

== Biography ==
Akram Fouad Khater was born on December 3, 1960, in Lebanon. He immigrated to the United States in 1978, during the Lebanese Civil War. Khater received a B.S. degree from California State Polytechnic University, an M.A. degree in 1987 from the University of California, Santa Cruz, and a Ph.D. from the University of California at Berkeley in 1993.

He is currently developing an undergraduate and master's program on teaching high school world history. He received the NCSU Outstanding Teacher Award for 1998–1999, and the NCSU Outstanding Junior Faculty Award for 1999–2000.

Khater produced the PBS documentary, Cedars in the Pines (2012) about the Lebanese community in North Carolina.

== Bibliography ==
=== Books ===
- Khater, Akram Fouad (1993). She Married Silk: A Rewriting of Peasant History in 19th Century Mount Lebanon (dissertation). University of California, Berkeley.
- Khater, Akram Fouad (2001). Inventing Home: Emigration, Gender, and the Middle Class in Lebanon, 1870-1920. Berkeley, CA: University of California Press. ISBN 9780520227408.
- Khater, Akram Fouad (2004). Sources in the History of the Modern Middle East. Boston, MA: Houghton Mifflin. ISBN 9780395980675.
- Khater, Akram Found (2011). Embracing the Divine: Passion and Politics in Christian Middle East. Gender, Culture, and Politics in the Middle East. Syracuse University Press. ISBN 9780815650577.

=== Articles, chapters ===
- Khater, Akram Fouad (November 1986). "Egyptian Feminism Today". The Middle East. 148: 17–18.
- Khater, Akram Fouad (1989). "Imbaba: The Camel Market of Cairo". Aramcoworld. Antoine Gerard (photography). Aramco World. ISSN 2376-1075.
- Khater, Akram Fouad (23 April 2009). ""House" to "Goddess of the House": Gender, Class, and Silk in 19th-century Mount Lebanon". International Journal of Middle East Studies. 28 (3): 325–348. doi:10.1017/S0020743800063480. S2CID 162375282.
