= If You Were Me: Anima Vision 2 =

- Directed by: Ann Dong-hee; Ryu Jung-oo; Hong Deok-pyo; Lee Hong-soo; Lee Hong-min; Jung Min-young; Gwon Mi-jeong; Park Yeong-jae
- Produced by: Nam Kyu-sun
- Release date: April 17, 2008
- Running time: 95 minutes
- Country: South Korea
- Language: Korean

If You Were Me: Anima Vision 2 (Korean: 별별 이야기 2: 여섯 빛깔 무지개; RR: Byeolbyeol iyagi 2: yeoseot bitkkal mujigae) is a 2008 South Korean animated film.

== Reception ==
It was nominated for the Asia Pacific Screen Award for Best Animated Feature Film at the 2nd Asia Pacific Screen Awards.
