= Nikolay Garo =

Russian and Soviet film director (1937–2026)

Nikolai Mikhailovich Garo (Russian: Николай Михайлович Гаро; 3 December 1937 – 14 March 2026) was a Russian film director, producer and actor.

== Life and career ==
Garo was born in Moscow on 3 December 1937. In 1978, he graduated from the Faculty of Economics of VGIK. He had been working in cinema since 1962.

He was a director at a number of projects of the Mosfilm film studio. As the director of the film, he worked with directors Georgy Danelia, Boris Volchek, Ivan Dykhovichny.

As an actor, he starred in several films, including Kin-dza-dza! (1986).

Garo died in Moscow on 14 March 2026, at the age of 88. He was buried in the Troyekurovsky cemetery.
