= Asia Pacific Screen Award for Best Animated Film =

Film award category

The Asia Pacific Screen Award for Best Animated Film formerly the Asia Pacific Screen Award for Best Animated Feature Film, are an award category in the annual Asia Pacific Screen Awards. The awards are given for animated films made in the Asia-Pacific region.

== Milestones ==
Japan has the most wins with five.

In 2024, The Missing is the first Filipino and Southeast Asian film to win in that category.

== Winners and nominees ==
Year	English title	Original title	Director(s)	Country(s)
2007 (1st)	5 Centimeters Per Second	Byōsoku Go Senchimētoru	Makoto Shinkai	Japan
2007 (1st)	The Big Fighting Between Wukong and God Erlang	Wukong Da Zhan Er Lang Shen	Liang Hansen	China
2007 (1st)	Summer Days with Coo	Kappa no Kū to Natsuyasumi	Keiichi Hara	Japan
2008 (2nd)	Waltz with Bashir	Vals Im Bashir	Ari Folman	Israel; France; Germany
2008 (2nd)	If You Were Me: Anima Vision 2	Byul-Byul Yi-Ya-Gi 2: Yeo-Seot-Bit-Ggal Mu-Ji-Gae	Ann Dong-hee, Ryu Jung-oo, Hong Deok-pyo, Lee Hong-soo, Lee Hong-min, Jung Min-young, Gwon Mi-jeong, and Park Yeong-jae	South Korea
2008 (2nd)	Sword of the Stranger	Sutorenjia Mukōhadan	Masahiro Andō	Japan
2009 (3rd)	Mary and Max		Adam Elliot	Australia
2009 (3rd)	First Squad: The Moment of Truth	Perviy otryad Fāsuto sukuwaddo	Yoshiharu Ashino	Russia; Japan
2009 (3rd)	The Sky Crawlers	Sukai Kurora	Mamoru Oshii	Japan
2009 (3rd)	Summer Wars	Samā Wōzu	Mamoru Hosoda	Japan
2009 (3rd)	The Tale of Soldier Fedot, The Daring Fellow	Pro Fedota-Streltsa, Udalogo Molodtsa	Lyudmila Steblyanko	Russia
2010 (4th)	Piercing I	Cì Tòng Wǒ	Liu Jian	China
2010 (4th)	King of Thorn	Ibara no Ou	Kazuyoshi Katayama	Japan
2010 (4th)	Legend of the Guardians: The Owls of Ga'Hoole		Zack Snyder	Australia; United States
2010 (4th)	Mai Mai Miracle	Maimai Shinko to Sen-nen no Mahō	Sunao Katabuchi	Japan
2010 (4th)	Oblivion Island: Haruka and the Magic Mirror	Hottarake no Shima: Haruka to Mahō no Kagami	Shinsuke Sato	Japan
2011 (5th)	Leafie, A Hen into the Wild	Madangeul Naon Amtak	Oh Sung-yun	South Korea
2011 (5th)	Children Who Chase Lost Voices	Hoshi o Ou Kodomo	Makoto Shinkai	Japan
2011 (5th)	RPG Metanoia		Luis C. Suárez	Philippines
2011 (5th)	Tatsumi		Eric Khoo	Singapore
2011 (5th)	The Ugly Duckling	Gadkiy utyonok	Garri Bardin	Russia
2012 (6th)	A Letter to Momo	Momo e no tegami	Hiroyuki Okiura	Japan
2012 (6th)	From Up on Poppy Hill	Kokurikozaka Kara	Gorō Miyazaki	Japan
2012 (6th)	Happy Feet Two		George Miller	Australia; United States
2012 (6th)	Rainbow Fireflies	Niji-Iro Hotaru: Eien no Natsu Yasumi	Kōnosuke Uda	Japan
2012 (6th)	Wolf Children	Ōkami Kodomo no Ame to Yuki	Mamoru Hosoda	Japan
2013 (7th)	Ku! Kin-dza-dza	Ку! Кин-дза-дза	Georgiy Daneliya and Tatyana Ilyina	Russia
2013 (7th)	The Fake	Saibi	Yeon Sang-ho	South Korea
2013 (7th)	Patema Inverted	Sakasama no Patema	Yasuhiro Yoshiura	Japan
2013 (7th)	The Wind Rises	Kaze Tachinu	Hayao Miyazaki	Japan
2013 (7th)	The World of Goopi and Bagha	Goopi Gawaiya Bagha Bajaiya	Shilpa Ranade	India
2014 (8th)	The Tale of the Princess Kaguya	Kaguya-hime no Monogatari	Isao Takahata	Japan
2014 (8th)	The Frog Kingdom	Qingwa Wangguo	Nelson Shin	China
2014 (8th)	Maya the Bee Movie		Alexs Stadermann	Australia; Germany
2014 (8th)	On the White Planet	Chang-baek-Han Eol-gul-deul	Hur Bum-wook	South Korea
2014 (8th)	The Satellite Girl and Milk Cow	Woo-ri-byul Il-ho-wa Ul-ruk-so	Chang Hyung-yun	South Korea
2015 (9th)	Miss Hokusai	Sarusuberi	Keiichi Hara	Japan
2015 (9th)	Blinky Bill the Movie		Deane Taylor	Australia; India; Ireland
2015 (9th)	The Road Called Life	Mae-mil-ggot, Un-su Jo-eun Nal, Geu-ri-go Bom-bom	Ahn Jae-Hun and Han Hye-jin	South Korea
2015 (9th)	The Snow Queen 2: The Snow King	Snezhnaya koroleva 2: Snezhny korol	Alexey Tsitsilin	Russia
2015 (9th)	When Marnie Was There	Omoide no Mānī	Hiromasa Yonebayashi	Japan
2016 (10th)	Seoul Station	Seoul-Yeok	Yeon Sang-ho	South Korea
2016 (10th)	Bilal: A New Breed of Hero		Khurram H. Alavi and Ayman Jamal	United Arab Emirates
2016 (10th)	Manang Biring		Carl Joseph Papa	Philippines
2016 (10th)	Savva: Heart of the Warrior	Savva. Serdtse voina	Maxim Fadeev	Russia
2016 (10th)	Sheep and Wolves	Volki i ovtsy	Maxim Volkov	Russia
2017 (11th)	Window Horses: The Poetic Persian Epiphany of Rosie Ming		Ann Marie Fleming	Canada
2017 (11th)	Have a Nice Day	Da Shi Jie	Liu Jian	China
2017 (11th)	Saving Sally		Avid Liongoren	Philippines
2017 (11th)	A Silent Voice	Eiga Koe no Katachi	Naoko Yamada	Japan
2017 (11th)	Your Name	Kimi no na wa.	Makoto Shinkai	Japan
2018 (12th)	Rezo	Znaesh', mama, gde ya byl	Leo Gabriadze	Russia
2018 (12th)	Hoffmaniada	Gofmaniada	Stanislav Sokolov	Russia
2018 (12th)	Maquia: When the Promised Flower Blooms	Sayonara no Asa ni Yakusoku no Hana o Kazarô	Mari Okada	Japan
2018 (12th)	Mirai	Mirai no Mirai	Mamoru Hosoda	Japan
2018 (12th)	On Happiness Road	Hsing Fu Lu Shang	Sung Hsin-yin	Taiwan
2019 (13th)	Weathering with You	Tenki no Ko	Makoto Shinkai	Japan
2019 (13th)	Mosley		Kirby Atkins	New Zealand; China
2019 (13th)	Penguin Highway	Pengin Haiwei	Hiroyasu Ishida	Japan
2019 (13th)	The Unseen	Kaghaz-Pareh ha	Behzad Nalbandi	Iran
2019 (13th)	Underdog	Eondeodog	Oh Sung-yoon and Lee Chun-baek	South Korea
2021 (14th)	The Nose or the Conspiracy of Mavericks	Nos ili zagovor netakikh	Andrei Khrzhanovsky	Russia
2021 (14th)	Beauty Water		Ningxia Film Group	South Korea
2021 (14th)	Fortune Favors Lady Nikuko	Gyokō no Nikuko-chan	Studio 4°C	Japan
2021 (14th)	The Knight and the Princess		Alsahar Animation	Saudi Arabia; Egypt
2021 (14th)	Where Is Anne Frank		Purple Whale Films; Doghouse Films	Belgium
2022 (15th)	Aurora's Sunrise	Արշալույսի լուսաբացը	Inna Shahakyan	Armenia; Lithuania; Germany
2022 (15th)	Dounia and the Princess of Aleppo	Dounia et la princesse d'Alep	André Kadi, Marya Zarif	Canada; France
2022 (15th)	Goodbye, Don Glees!	Gubbai, Don Gurīzu!	Atsuko Ishizuka	Japan
2022 (15th)	Silver Bird and Rainbow Fish		Lei Lei	USA; Netherlands; China
2022 (15th)	To the Bright Side		Xiya Lan, Nianze Li, Yi Zhao, Kun Yu, Gaoxiang Liu, Maoning Liu, Chen Chen	China
2023 (16th)	The Siren		Sepideh Farsi	France; Germany; Luxembourg; Belgium
2023 (16th)	Deep Sea	Shēnhǎi	Tian Xiaopeng	China
2023 (16th)	The First Slam Dunk		Takehiko Inoue	Japan
2023 (16th)	Scarygirl		Ricard Cussó	Australia
2023 (16th)	Suzume	Suzume no Tojimari	Makoto Shinkai	Japan
2024 (17th)	The Missing	Iti Mapukpukaw	Carl Joseph Papa, Geo Lomuntad, Dan Villegas	Philippines
2024 (17th)	Ghost Cat Anzu	Bakeneko Anzu-chan	Yoko Kuno, Nobuhiro Yamashita, Keiichi Kondo, Emmanuel-Alain Raynal, Pierre Baussaron, Hiroyuki Negishi	Japan; France
2024 (17th)	Memoir of a Snail		Adam Elliot, Liz Kearney	Australia
2024 (17th)	Pig That Survived Foot-and-Mouth Disease		Hur Bum-wook, Cho Heaseung	South Korea
2024 (17th)	The Colors Within	Kimi no Iro	Naoko Yamada, Eunyoung Choi, Yoshihiro Furusawa, Genki Kawamura, Wakana Okamura, Kohei Sakita	Japan
2025 (18th)	The Square		Kim Park So-hye, Kim Bo-sol	South Korea
2025 (18th)	Another World		Tommy Ng Kai Chung, Polly Yeung, Chan Gin Kai	Hong Kong
2025 (18th)	ChaO		Yasuhiro Aoki Eiko Tanaka	Japan
2025 (18th)	The Lost Tiger		Chantelle Murray, Kristen Souvlis, Nadine Bates, Chantelle Murray	Australia
2025 (18th)	A Story About Fire		Wenyu Li,Chen Bo, Wang Anti	China
