= Nata Moreno =

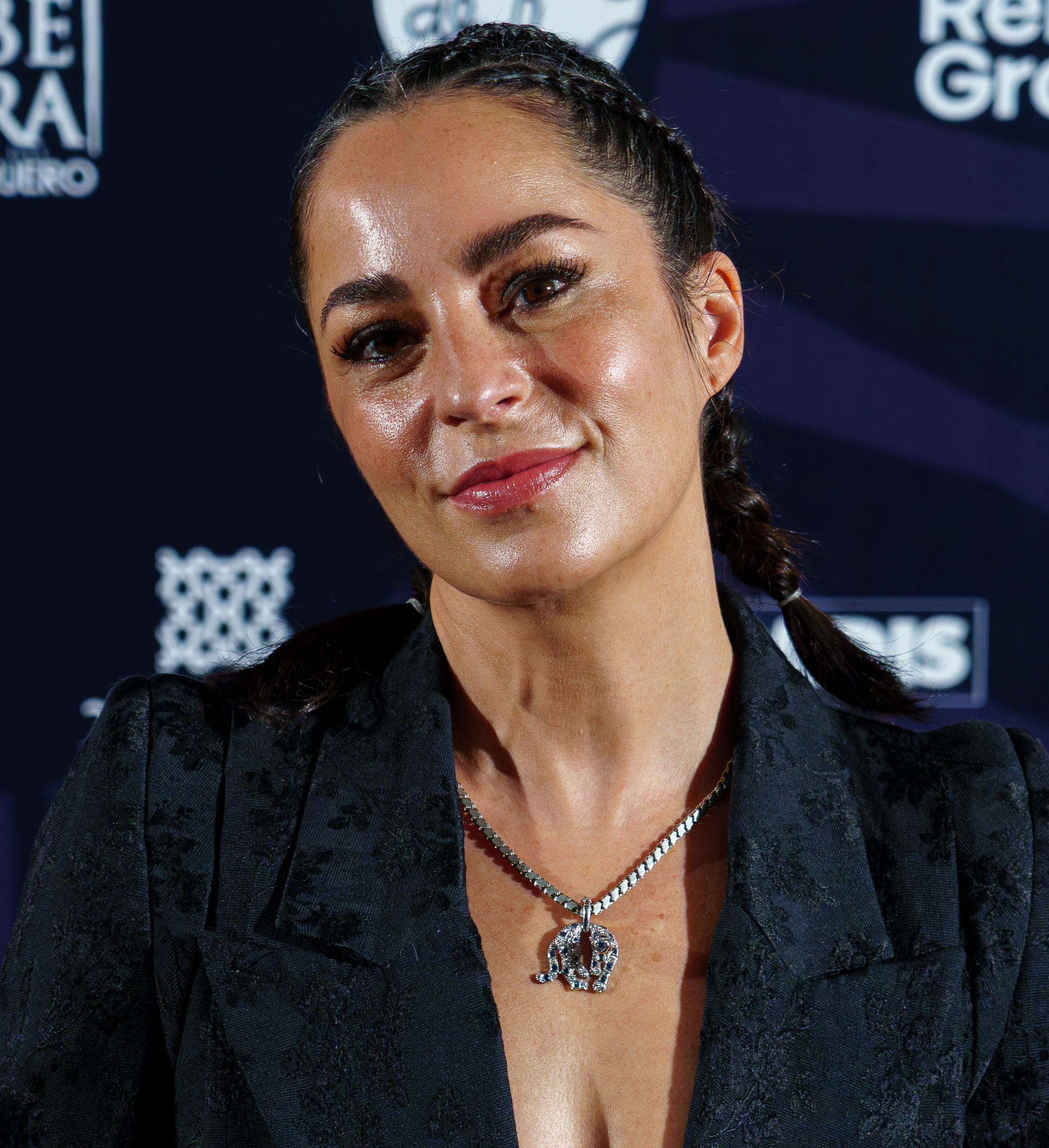
- Moreno at the 2020 Goya Awards
- Born: March 24, 1979 (age 47); Zaragoza, Spain
- Occupations: Director, producer, actress, playwright
- Years active: 2016–present

Nata Moreno (born March 24, 1979) is a Spanish director, producer, actress, and playwright whose debut feature film, Ara Malikian: una vida entre las cuerdas, won the Goya Award, the José María Forqué Cinematographic Award for Best Documentary Feature, and the Silver Biznaga Mujeres en Escena at the Málaga Film Festival.

== Early life ==
Moreno was born in Zaragoza and raised in Huesca. She moved to Madrid to study Dramatic Art and Acting at the School founded by Juan Carlos Corazza. She worked as assistant director to Will Keen and José Sanchís Sinisterra, and as a playwright alongside Juan Mayorga at the Chair of Scenic Creation of the Carlos III University of Madrid. After performing on stage as an actress, she decided to direct and work behind the camera, founding her own production company, Kokoro Films, in 2016.

== Career ==
In advertising, Moreno directed several commercials and music videos. Among her notable works are "Ara Malikian-acción contra el hambre" (2016), "The incredible story of the violin" (2016), and "Vuela" (2018). In the field of fiction short films, she directed and wrote the screenplays for "Le chat doré" (2016) and "Al'Amar" (2018).

After directing short documentaries such as "Anecdotario Ara Malikian" (2016), "Ara Malikian al habla" (2016), and "Guaguacuna" (2017), she premiered her first feature-length documentary in 2018: "Ara Malikian: una vida entre las cuerdas".

Moreno's work is characterized by the poetry of her images, demonstrating a strong social commitment in her treatment of themes such as migration and motherhood. She is the stage director of all the musical shows of violinist Ara Malikian.

In her acting career, Moreno appeared in the television series "Muñecas" (2013) and in the short films "Amén" (2016) and "Gastos incluidos" (2019).

In 2020, she participated with her short film "El espacio vacío" in the collective work "Reset", a production of Aragón TV composed of seven audiovisual pieces directed by prestigious Aragonese filmmakers showing their particular vision of the health crisis caused by COVID-19.

In June 2021, Moreno announced that she would return to the stage with the play "El Alivio o la crueldad de los muertos", while developing her first fiction feature film, "Onna fly", supported by CIMA, NETFLIX, and the ICAA.

In 2023, she directed the short film "Madreselva," presented in the official section of the 36th Medina del Campo Film Week, starring Luis Tosar, Marina Salas, Vito Sanz, and Estefanía de los Santos.

== Awards and nominations ==
=== Premios Simón ===
Year	Category	Film	Result
2019	Best Director	Ara Malikian: una vida entre las cuerdas	Won
2020	Best Director	Reset	Nominated
2020	Best Screenplay	Reset	Nominated

Ara Malikian al habla was nominated for the Latin Grammy Awards.

Le chat doré won the award for best comedy short at the European Independent Film Festival ÉCU, special jury mention at the Silent Film Festival in Croatia, and honorable mention at the International Silent Film Festival in Mexico.

Ara Malikian: una vida entre las cuerdas won the Goya Award for Best Documentary Feature at the 2020 Goya Awards and the José María Forqué Cinematographic Award in 2020. It also received the Silver Biznaga Mujeres en Escena at the Málaga Film Festival. It was nominated for the Platino Awards for Ibero-American Cinema and the Circle of Cinematographic Writers Medals (CEC) 2019 in Spain.

Madreselva won the Special Jury Prize for Best Director and the Best Photography Prize at the Medina del Campo Film Week in 2023.

== Filmography ==
Year	Title	Director	Producer	Writer	Actress	Notes
2016	Le chat doré	Yes	No	Yes	No	Short film
2016	Ara Malikian: una vida entre las cuerdas	Yes	Yes	No	No	Documentary
2018	Al’Amar	Yes	No	Yes	No	Short film
2019	Gastos incluidos	No	No	No	Yes	Short film
2019	El espacio vacío	Yes	No	Yes	No	Short film
2023	Madreselva	Yes	No	No	No	Short film
