= The Smalls Film Festival =

Film festival

The Smalls Film Festival is an independent film festival which takes place annually in London. Founded in 2006, the festival is one of the UK's major short film festivals, featuring an international programme of short films, talks, panels, discussions and workshops. The festival has had many collaborative partners including BAFTA, Creative Review, Devilfish, UKTV, Panavision, and the London Design Festival.

== History ==
The Smalls Film Festival is hosted by The Smalls. Launched in 2006, initially as Small Films for Small Screens, the event was run by a group of short film enthusiasts in partnership with the London Design Festival and Creative Review to create an event showcasing short film. Hosted in London's Covent Garden, the “Small Films for Small Screens” was the first event to show short films on iPod Videos. The event became an annual series of competitions including The Comedy Smalls and The Smalls Showcase and Awards, before extending to a successful 5-day event in 2013. The same year it was included on MovieMakers list of coolest film festivals in the world. The 12th edition of the six-day event took place in 2017. For the 2020 festival, the 15th festival, they added an additional category to the 7 they already had. The new category was Action and Activism, while the other categories include: Animation, Branded Content, Comedy, Documentary, Drama, Music Video and Student Film.

== Festivals ==
=== 2015 ===
In 2015 the festival took place at the Hoxton Arches between 4 and 9 September 2015 – celebrating its 10th anniversary. In 2015, the event became a 6-day event. Categories for entries included: Drama, Comedy, Animation, Music Video, Documentary, and The Red Digital Cinema Award for Emerging Talent. The festival hosted a series of events including a virtual reality and sales pitch workshop, and a talk with BAFTA award-winning documentary maker Kim Longinotto. The juries included representatives from The Guardian, London Short Film Festival, the BFI, Warner Brothers, Creative England, and Encounters Short Film Festival.

==== 2015 Festival Winners ====
- Best Animation - My Dad - Marcus Armitage
- Best Drama - The Substitute - Nathan Hughes-Berry
- Best Documentary' - Chappin - Igor Slepov
- Best Music Video - Low Life - Jakarno, Tahiti Boy & Palmtree Family
- The Red Digital Cinema Award for Emerging Talent - Murmur - Aurora Fearnley

=== 2016 ===
The festival took place at Hackney House between 2 and 7 September 2016 – marking the 11th edition of the event. The theme of the 2016 festival was "Metamorphosis"; a celebration of the essential role it plays in cinema and The Smalls transformation with rapid expansion. Categories for entries included: Animation, Drama, Comedy, Music Video, Branded Video Content, Local Filmmaker, Student Film and Documentary. A number of industry panels were featured; including talks on securing funding for films, comedy writing and the future of digital publishing. The juries included representatives from Universal Pictures, the BBC, LOCO London Comedy Film Festival, Film 4, Women in Film and Television, and Spotify.

==== 2016 Festival Winners ====
- Best Animation - Fulfillment - Rhiannon Evans
- Best Comedy - Cropped - Chris Thomas
- Best Branded Content - Hi Maintenance - Raleigh Ritchie
- Best Drama - The Wonderful Flight - Ian Allardyce & Bat-Amgalan Lkhagvajav
- Best Documentary - The Shining Star of Losers Everywhere - Mickey Duzyj
- Best Student Film - Dear Miss Bassey - June Miles-Kingston
- Best Music Video - Yeasayer: I Am Chemistry - New Media Ltd
- Best Local Filmmaker - Platform 1 - Jessica Bishopp

=== 2017 ===
The Smalls Film Festival 2017 took place from 1 to 6 September.

=== 2018 ===
The Smalls Film Festival 2018 took place from 7 to 10 September and the theme was Fighting for 50/50 in Film. The festival focused on women in film.

=== 2019 ===
The Smalls Film Festival 2019 took place from 6 to 9 September in Shoreditch and included an additional category to highlight environmental issues.

==== The Smalls Film Festival APAC 2017 ====
On 11t February 2017, the festival launched the Asia-Pacific edition of the festival, in Singapore. The festival was run in conjunction with Filmic Eye and the Singapore Film Society, and showcased talent from the international film-making community. Films from Singapore, the UK, Mongolia and the USA were screened. Notable films included Micky Duzyj's, The Shining Star of Losers Everywhere, awarded winner of Best Documentary at The Smalls Film Festival 2016. The event also included a reception and networking session.
