= Levan Gabriadze =

Georgian-Russian actor and director (born 1969)

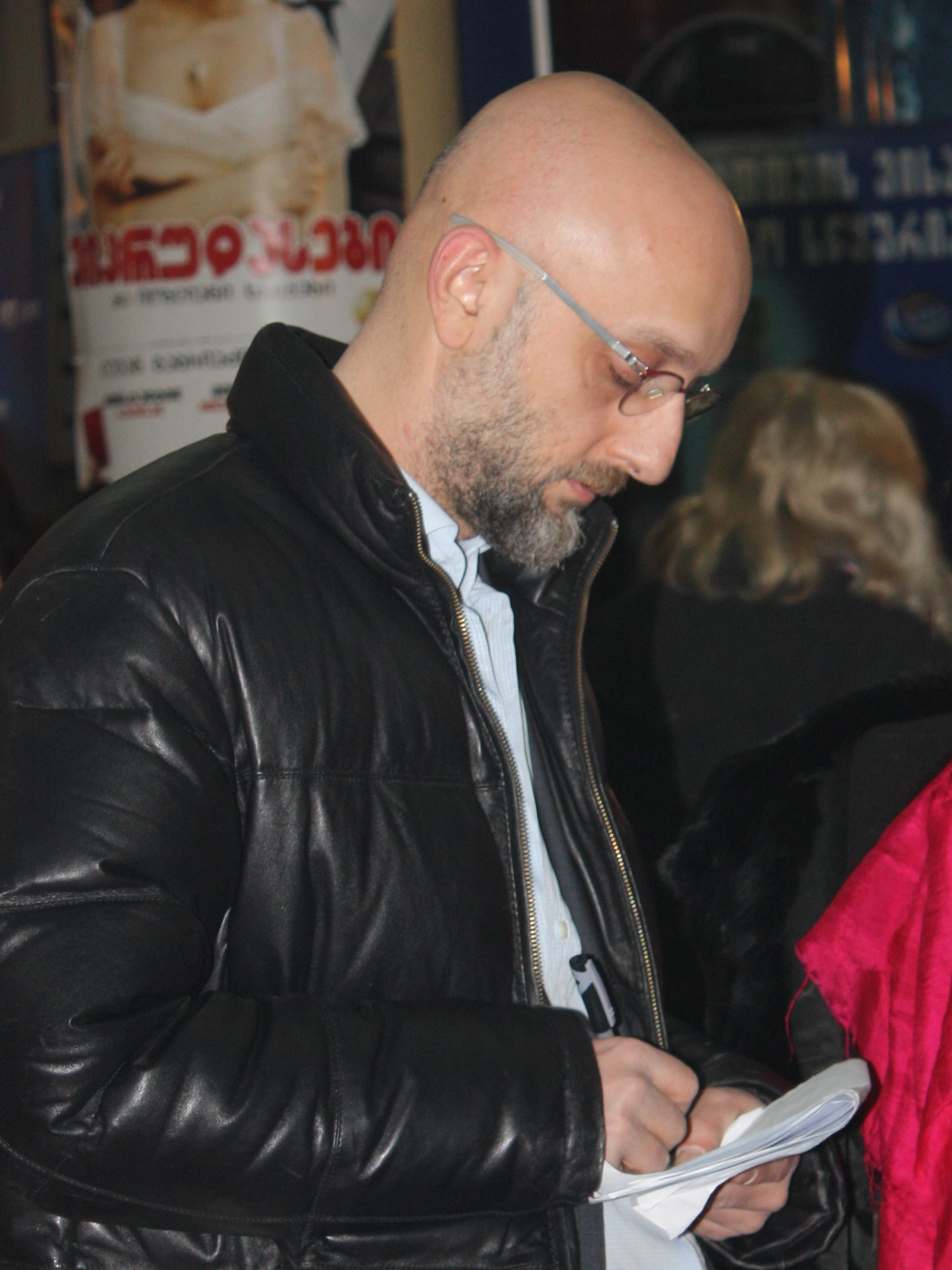
- Levan Gabriadze in 2011
- Born: 16 November 1969 (age 56); Tbilisi, Georgian SSR, USSR
- Citizenship: Georgian, Russian
- Occupations: Actor, director

Levan "Leo" Gabriadze (Georgian: ლევან რევაზის ძე გაბრიაძე, Levan Revazis dze Gabriadze; Russian: Лева́н Рева́зович Габриа́дзе, Levan Revazovich Gabriadze; born 16 November 1969) is a Georgian-Russian actor and film director. He is best known for directing the 2014 horror film Unfriended.

== Biography ==
Gabriadze was born in Tbilisi, then part of the Soviet Georgia. His father, Revaz Gabriadze, was an actor, writer and director. By age 12, Leo was already working in his father's productions.

At age 17, he was invited to star in one of the main roles of the film Kin-dza-dza!. He graduated from the workshop of Shota Rustaveli Theatre and Film University, specialized in acting and set design.

He served in the Soviet Army, Air Defense Forces with the rank of private, serving as a fireman.

In 1990, he entered the University of California (UCLA) (Los Angeles) in the Faculty of Design and Animation. In 2000, he moved to Moscow, where he became the advertising director of the film company Bazelevs.

In 2010, he made his first feature film Lucky Trouble which won the audience award "Golden Taiga" in the festival "Spirit of Fire" in Khanty-Mansiysk in February 2011.

In 2014, he directed the horror film Unfriended.

In 2017, he finished working on an animated film based on the stories of his father Rezo Gabriadze, titled Rezo. The film was released in May 2018.

== Filmography ==
=== As actor ===
- Zneli dasatskisi (1990, as Actor)
- Kin-dza-dza! (1986, as Gedevan Alexandrovich Alexidze - 'Fiddler')
- Passport (1990)

=== As director ===
- Lucky Trouble (Vykrutasy, 2011)
- Yolki 2 (2011, segment director, as Leo Gabriadze)
- Yolki 3 (2013, segment director, as Leo Gabriadze)
- Unfriended (2014)
- Rezo (2017)
