= Moise A. Khayrallah Center for Lebanese Diaspora Studies =

Department of North Carolina State University

- Former name: The Lebanese in North Carolina Project
- Type: Research Institute
- Established: 2010
- Founder: Moise Khayrallah
- Parent institution: College of Humanities and Social Sciences
- Affiliations: North Carolina State University
- Director: Akram Khater
- Location: Raleigh, North Carolina
- Website: http://lebanesestudies.ncsu.edu/

The Moise A. Khayrallah Center for Lebanese Diaspora Studies is a public history and research center at the North Carolina State University's College of Humanities and Social Sciences. Founded in 2010, its mission is to support the production and dissemination of knowledge about the Lebanese diaspora in the US and throughout the world. The center is located in Raleigh, North Carolina.

The center supports a digital archive of material about the Lebanese diaspora and conducts oral history collection. The center produced the PBS documentary Cedars in the Pines: The Lebanese in North Carolina (2012) and collaborated with the North Carolina Museum of Art to produce the Cedars in the Pines museum exhibition documenting the history of the Lebanese-American community in North Carolina. The center has also developed a K-12 curriculum and publishes the peer-reviewed journal Mashriq & Mahjar: Journal of Middle East Migration Studies.

== History ==
In 2010, Dr. Moise Khayrallah funded a pilot project to research, preserve and publicize the history of the Lebanese in North Carolina. Originally called The Lebanese in North Carolina Project under the direction of the Khayrallah Program for Lebanese-American Studies, this initiative led to the production of the PBS documentary, the design and installation of a museum exhibition, a K-12 curriculum, as well as the development of an online digital archive. Endowed in October 2014 with an $8.1M donation by the Moise and Vera Khayrallah Fund, the Project was renamed the Moise A. Khayrallah Center for Lebanese Diaspora Studies.
