= Revaz Gabriadze =

Georgian theatre and film director (1936–2021)

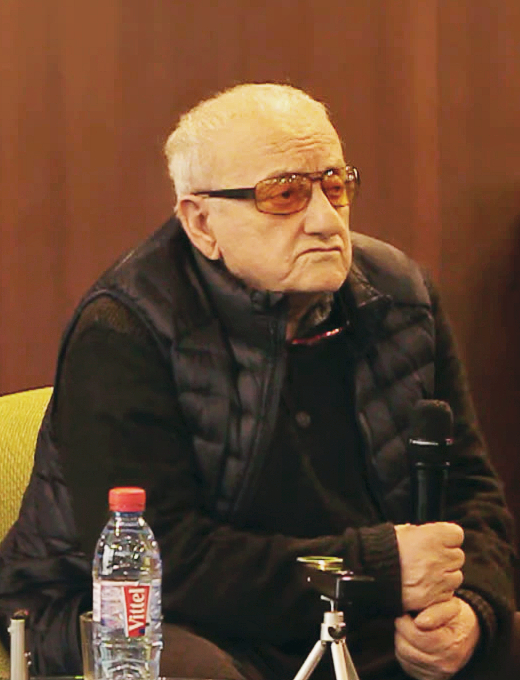
- Gabriadze in 2016
- Born: 29 June 1936; Kutaisi, Georgian SSR, Soviet Union
- Died: 6 June 2021 (aged 84)
- Occupations: Screenwriter, puppeteer

Revaz "Rezo" Gabriadze (Georgian: რევაზ [რეზო] გაბრიაძე; 29 June 1936 – 6 June 2021) was a Georgian theatre and film director, playwright, writer, painter, and sculptor. His son, Levan Gabriadze, is also an actor and film director.

Gabriadze graduated from the Higher Scriptwriters' Courses in Moscow and worked as a correspondent for the newspaper Youth of Georgia. He began working as a screenwriter for director Georgiy Daneliya and co-wrote some of his most popular films, including Mimino and Kin-dza-dza!

Gabriadze also worked as a scenographer, painter, sculptor, and book illustrator. In 1981 he founded a puppet theatre in Kutaisi. He was awarded a USSR State Prize in 1989.

== Works and activities ==
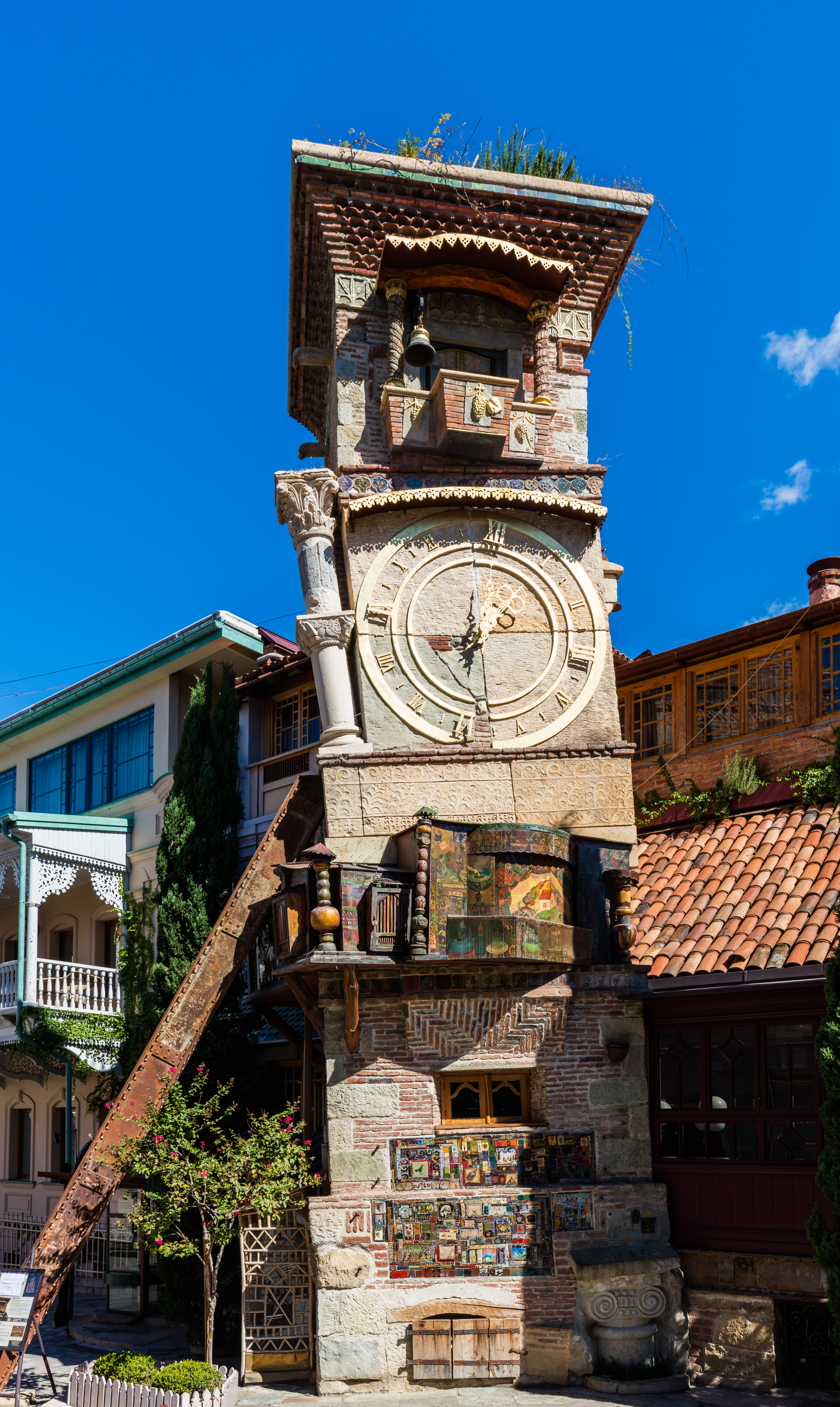
Puppet theatre in Tbilisi dedicated to Gabriadze

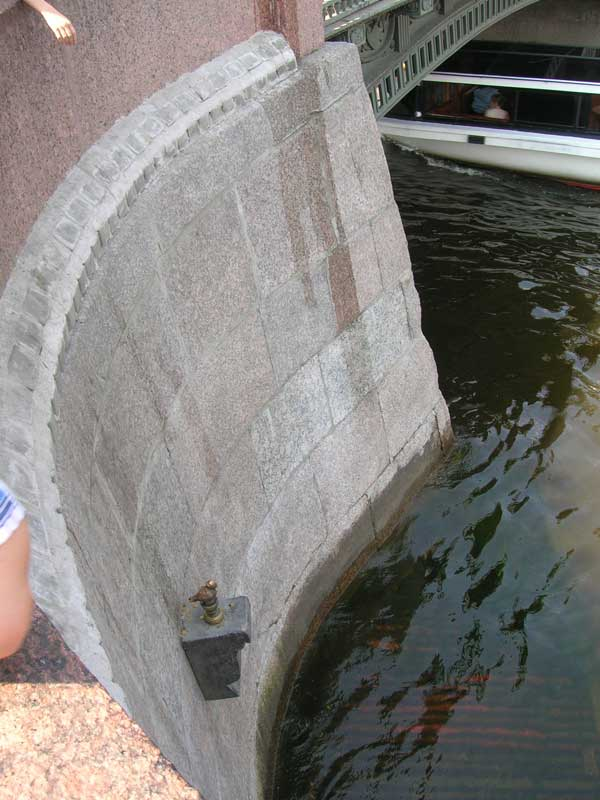
The little siskin Chizhik-Pyzhik sculpture in Saint Petersburg over the Fontanka river

Gabriadze wrote over 35 screenplays, including such influential films as Don't Grieve, Mimino, The Eccentrics and Kin-Dza-Dza!. At some point he was frustrated with lack of intellectual freedom in the Soviet Union, turned to puppet theatre as an overlooked way to tell his dramatic stories and in 1981 founded and till his death headed the Marionette Theatre based in Tbilisi. From the very first performance the audience gave its heart to the theatre. His productions Alfred and Violete, The Autumn of our Springtime, Ramona and The Battle of Stalingrad brought the theatre recognition of international audiences and critics alike. Since the 1990s, Gabriadze started to work abroad, where he staged numerous productions. The theatre company has been touring around the world extensively including, New York City’s Lincoln Center Festival; The Edinburgh Festival; San Sebastián Festival, Spain; Toronto World Stage Festival; Theatre de la Ville, Paris; Barbican Center, London, etc. As a painter, he contributed to numerous exhibitions and his works are preserved in museums and private collections. Over 50 books are illustrated with Gabriadze’s graphic works. He counts among his many international awards Commander of the Order of Arts and Letters of the French Republic.

=== Bibliography ===
- Chito ГК-49-54 or a Doctor and a Patient, Publishing Sani, 2003
- The Eccentrics, 1983, Publishing Sani, 2002, Magti 2014
- Kutaisi is a City, Publishing Sani, 2002
- The White Bridge, Rezo Gabriadze, 1987

=== Literary prizes and awards ===
- Nika Award 1991 for the best screenplay Passport
- Laureate of Triumph Award 1997 Russia
- Laureate of Golden Mask, 1997 Russia
- Laureate of Golden Soffit Theatre Award, 1997 Russia
- Laureate of Shota Rustaveli State Prize of Georgia 1989
- Laureate of the USSR State Prize 1989
- Laureate of the State Prize of Georgia 1987
- Special award of Mar-Del-Plate 1970 (X) International Film Festival for the screenplay Don’t Grieve
- Diploma of South Caucasus and Ukrainian III 1969 Film Festival for the best screenplay Extraordinary Exhibition

=== Selected screenplays ===
Film
Year	Title	Notes
1990	Passport	
1986	Kin-dza-dza!	
1977	Mimino	
1969	Don't Grieve	
