= Atlas King =

Upcoming film

- Directed by: Nika Agiashvili
- Written by: Nika Agiashvili
- Produced by: Nika Agiashvili; Michael Bisping; George Finn; Savannah Belcher; Mike Campbell; Ben Holland; Deanna Plascencia; Zaina Tibi
- Starring: Michael Bisping; Cuba Gooding Jr.; George Finn; Anne Winters; Sarah Wayne Callies; Lara Wolf; John Edward Lee; Tetiana Dar; Jeff Perkins; François Chau
- Cinematography: Alfonso Aguilar
- Edited by: Jason Zeni
- Music by: Zviad Mgebry
- Production companies: Punch It Films; Storyman Pictures; Minds Eye Entertainment; Nacon Capital
- Distributed by: Saban Films
- Release date: August 21, 2026
- Running time: 90 minutes
- Country: United States
- Language: English

Atlas King is a 2026 American action thriller film written and directed by Nika Agiashvili. The film stars Michael Bisping in his first leading role, alongside Cuba Gooding Jr., George Finn, Sarah Wayne Callies, and Anne Winters. It was produced by Agiashvili's Punch It Films. Highland Film Group handled worldwide sales, while Saban Films acquired North American distribution rights.

The film was introduced to international buyers at the 2026 European Film Market in Berlin. It was released digitally and on demand in North America on August 21, 2026.

== Plot ==
Atlas King, a former mixed martial arts champion, returns to Los Angeles for the funeral of his mentor and father figure, Dutch. The city's fight scene is now controlled by crime boss Clay Emerson. Atlas sets out to protect Dutch's grown children, Tommy and Penelope. Tensions escalate until a final battle between Atlas and Clay.

== Cast ==
- Michael Bisping as Atlas King
- Cuba Gooding Jr. as Clay Emerson
- George Finn as Tommy
- Sarah Wayne Callies as Penelope

== Production ==
Atlas King was written and directed by Nika Agiashvili, previously known for Tbilisi, I Love You and Daughter of the Wolf. The film was produced under Punch It Films, a company Agiashvili co-founded with George Finn, Michael Bisping, and producer-investor John Edward Lee. In a 2026 interview with Variety, Agiashvili said the group had spent a long time trying to get the project off the ground before it finally came together.

Additional producers on the film include Zaina Tibi, Deanna Plascencia, Savannah Belcher, Mike Campbell, and Ben Holland. John Edward Lee and Kevin DeWalt served as executive producers alongside Arianne Fraser and Delphine Perrier of Highland Film Group.

== Release ==
Highland Film Group first boarded worldwide sales for Atlas King in September 2025, introducing the film to buyers at the Toronto International Film Festival. In March 2026, Saban Films acquired North American distribution rights to the film from Highland Film Group. The film was released on digital and on-demand platforms in North America on August 21, 2026.
