= Berlin, I Love You =

2019 anthology romantic drama film

- Theatrical release poster
- Directed by: Dianna Agron; Peter Chelsom; Fernando Eimbcke; Justin Franklin; Dennis Gansel; Dani Levy; Daniel Lwowski; Josef Rusnak; Til Schweiger; Massy Tadjedin; Gabriela Tscherniak
- Written by: Fernando Eimbcke; Justin Franklin; Dennis Gansel; Alison Kathleen Kelly; Dani Levy; Massy Tadjedin; Gabriela Tscherniak; David Vernon
- Produced by: Claus Clausen; Edda Reiser; Josef Steinberger
- Starring: Helen Mirren; Keira Knightley; Mickey Rourke; Diego Luna; Jim Sturgess; Dianna Agron; Rafaëlle Cohen; Jenna Dewan; Toni Garrn; Sibel Kekilli; Hannelore Elsner; Robert Stadlober; Luke Wilson
- Cinematography: Kolja Brandt
- Edited by: Peter R. Adam; Daniel Kundrat; Christoph Strothjohann
- Music by: Franco Tortora, Tom Batoy
- Production companies: Rheingold Films; Walk on Water Films
- Distributed by: Warner Bros. Pictures (Germany); Saban Films (United States)
- Release dates: February 8, 2019 (United States); August 8, 2019 (Germany)
- Running time: 120 minutes
- Countries: Germany; United States
- Languages: English, German

Berlin, I Love You is a 2019 anthology romantic drama film starring an ensemble cast. A joint German and U.S. production, it serves as the fifth installment of the Cities of Love series created by Emmanuel Benbihy, after 2006's Paris, je t'aime, the 2008 film New York, I Love You, and Tbilisi, I Love You and Rio, I Love You both released in 2014.

This last installment of the series consists of ten stories of romance set in the German capital. The different stories follow wandering souls searching for affection, recognition and/or redemption, which intersect in this anthology full of humanity, subtlety and sweetness.

It was released on February 8, 2019, in the United States, by Saban Films, and on August 8, 2019, in Germany, by Warner Bros. Pictures.

== Plot ==
=== Transitions ===
The two characters, male street performer Damiel who wears angel wings and female Israeli street singer Sara who is newly arrived to Berlin, act as a throughline, their story popping up periodically throughout.

As the film progresses, Damiel and Sara's connection grows until, by the end of the film, they are together.

=== Berlin Ride ===
Heartbroken young American Jared has come to Berlin to commit suicide, as his fiancée Natalie left him for his brother and this was their planned honeymoon destination. He finds a new reason to live, thanks to the BMW he purchases. It has a voice called Vanessa, which refuses to let Jared kill himself by driving off a bridge, but suggests the woman who broke his heart is not worth it. 'She' insists on taking him on a ride through Berlin.

By the end of the day, Jared thanks 'Vanessa' for restoring his faith in love. The next time he talks to 'her', 'she' responds with what seems like 'her' factory settings. Jared interacts with his noisy neighbor Rose and soon they develop a relationship. He sells the car, so someone else can be helped by her, as he is happy again.

=== Under Your Feet ===
Refugee center worker Jane brings home young Arab boy Nisar home temporarily, as his mother had to accompany his brother to the hospital due to pneumonia. As he is not allowed to stay another night unaccompanied, and concerned he might not able to reunify with them, she takes him home.

Arriving to her apartment, Jane's mother is there. Margaret disapproves, fearing her daughter could run into problems. Jane pops out for an hour to meet a friend. After spending an hour with Nisar, Margaret's perspective changes, so then tells her she is proud of her.

=== Love Is in the Air ===
Set in a hotel, American businessman Jim shares flirtations with the gorgeous, much younger American 'Heather' in the bar. After sorrowfully admitting how he has always regretted not being able to know his daughter, whose custody he lost when she was small, the young woman agrees to accompany him to his hotel room.

In the room, 'Heather' asks Jim if they can just sleep, with no sex. When he wakes, she has gone. However, she leaves him a message on the mirror in lipstick, saying 'I forgive you, Daddy.'

=== Berlin Dance ===
Louise, a recently-arrived American woman, while seeking an address, crosses through various street performers including Max Raabe and his Palast Orchester. After a dream sequence in which she ballroom dances, she ends up in the arms of Nico (the person she has come to visit).

=== Me Three ===
Three women bond in an unlikely place, the Berlin Laundromat, the owner and two others swap sexual harassment stories. After they turn away a prime offender, Artemis Serac, their quiet evening is brightened up by an impromptu rave. The huge group bursts in, animating everyone to dance freely.

=== Hidden ===
An Arab asylum seeker who mortally stabbed a 15 year old German boy in "self-defense" as he was one of three trying to burn down his home, seeks refuge in a brothel. Leila lets him stay briefly but, not wanting to be separated from his wife and kids, he hurries back just as the refugees are being loaded into a van. Just before getting in, the police I.D. him.

=== Sunday Morning ===
A transgender woman goes to sit by the river, crying over a fight with her boyfriend. A just turned 16-year-old boy shares a beer with her, then asks for a kiss, curious about his own sexuality.

=== Lucinda in Berlin ===
Feeling burnt-out, Hollywood producer Burke Linz stops to watch the young puppeteer Katarina's show. They have a brief conversation, which gives him creative and emotional inspiration.

=== Embassy ===
Turkish-German would-be journalist Yasil is currently driving a taxi. The cheerful, talkative taxi driver sharply contrasts with the taciturn and nervous American customer she picks up, Greg. Soon, however even he cannot resist her natural charm, so starts talking, mostly about being true to yourself.

Almost arriving at their destination, the person Greg is to be meeting gets abducted. Suddenly, the story shifts into the realm of spy thriller, as they have to evade the van with a car chase. Rerouting to the embassy, the van still intercepts him.

However, Greg has left behind the manila envelope he had been carrying, so the journalist Yasil can break the story.

== Cast ==
- Helen Mirren as Margaret
- Keira Knightley as Jane
- Mickey Rourke as Jim
- Diego Luna as Drag Queen
- Jim Sturgess as Jared
- Dianna Agron as Katarina
- Rafaëlle Cohen as Sara
- Jenna Dewan as Mandy
- Toni Garrn as Heather
- Sibel Kekilli as Yasil
- Hannelore Elsner as Madame Rose
- Robert Stadlober as Damiel
- Emily Beecham as Hannah
- Luke Wilson as Burke Linz
- Charlotte Le Bon as Rose
- Iwan Rheon as Greg
- Nolan Gerard Funk as Nico
- Julia Dietze as Tania
- Nikolai Kinski as Alister
- Alexander Black as Selim
- Sylvester Groth as Frosch
- Veronica Ferres as Else
- Max Raabe as himself
- Carol Schuler as Laila
- Nafsika Pan as Sophie
- Kostas Sommer as Agent
- Pheline Roggan as Anne
- Yvonne Maria Schäfer as Janis
- Jake Webber as Artemis Serac

== Production ==
It was announced in October 2017 that filming had begun on the latest installment of the Cities of Love series and would conclude in November. Amongst the announced cast included Helen Mirren, Keira Knightley, Jim Sturgess, Mickey Rourke, and Diego Luna. Emily Beecham was announced as being cast in June 2018. A trailer shared by Dianna Agron, who stars in and directs a segment of the film, revealed the involvements of Luke Wilson, Charlotte Le Bon and Iwan Rheon.

Saban Films acquired the distribution rights for the film in May 2018.

In February 2019, artist Ai Weiwei claimed that his section of Berlin, I Love You was cut due to pressure from China's government. "The reason we were given for the episode’s removal [..] was that my political status had made it difficult for the production team."

== Reception ==
Berlin, I Love You received negative reviews from film critics. It holds an 11% approval rating on review aggregator website Rotten Tomatoes, based on 18 reviews, with an average of 3.9/10. On Metacritic, the film holds a rating of 34 out of 100, based on eight critics, indicating "generally unfavorable" reviews.
