= David Agiashvili =

Georgian film director, producer and screenwriter

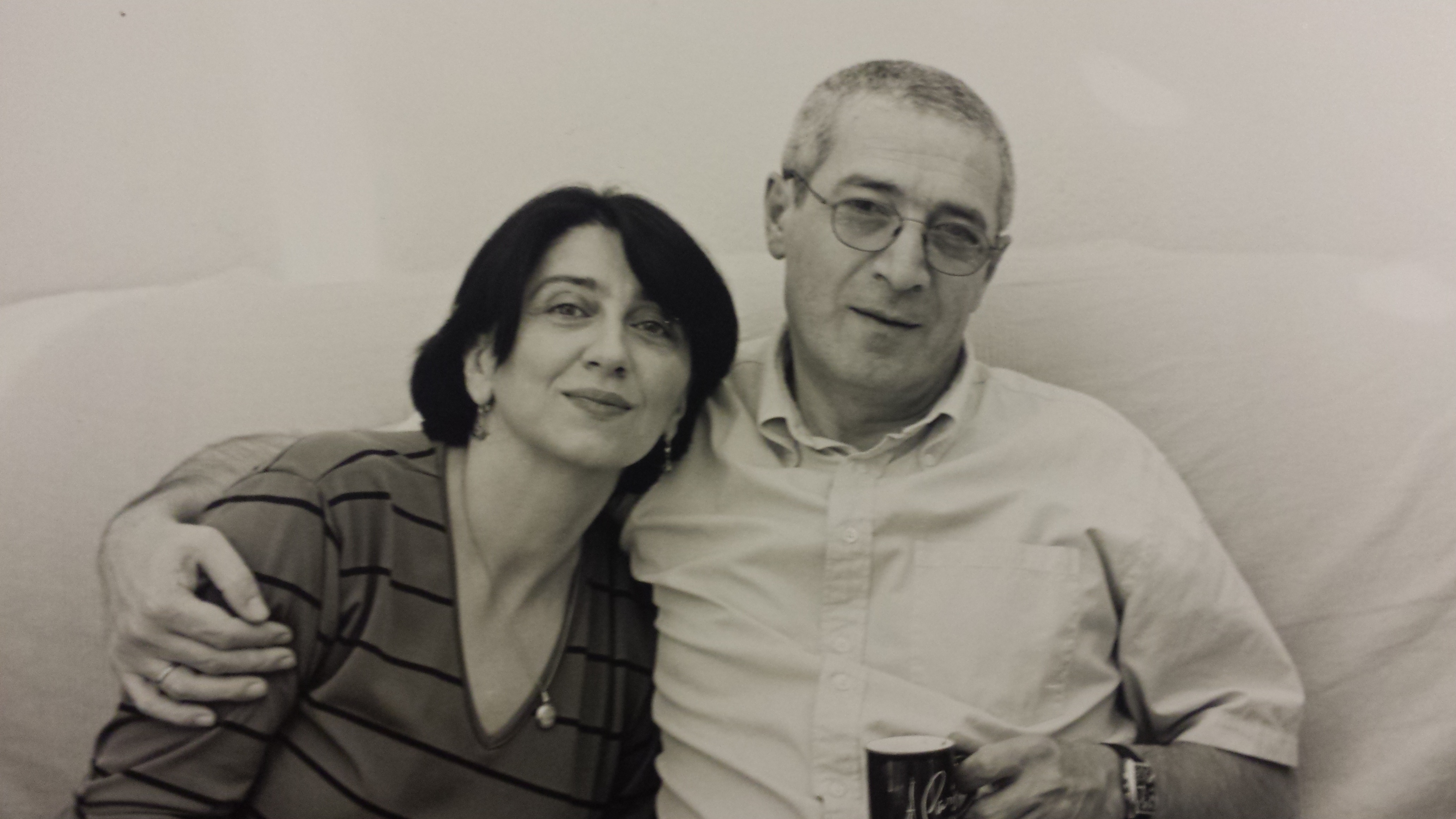
- David Agiashvili and Marika Lomtatidze
- Born: July 28, 1949; Tbilisi, Georgia
- Died: February 12, 2014 (aged 64); Los Angeles
- Occupations: Film director, screenwriter, producer
- Years active: 1974 – 2014
- Spouse: Marika Lomtatidze

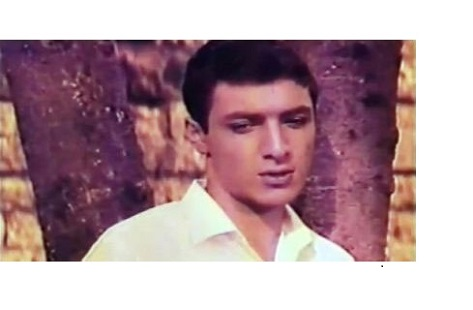
Dato Agiashvili as the lead in the film Gangashi (1968)

David Agiashvili (Georgian: დავით აგიაშვილი; July 28, 1949 – February 12, 2014) was a Georgian film director and screenwriter. As a young man, he starred in the 1968 film Gangashi, a role that made him widely recognized across Georgia and, according to retrospective coverage, won him enduring public affection for the rest of his life, even though it remained his only screen acting credit.

== Biography ==
David Agiashvili was born in Tbilisi on July 28, 1949, in the family of the writer Nikoloz Agiashvili. He graduated from the faculty of philology of the Tbilisi State University majoring in journalism. The Agiashvili surname is associated with a historic Georgian noble family from the Kingdom of Imereti, with documented records dating to the 17th century. He was the father of filmmaker Nika Agiashvili and actor George Finn, and his daughter Maia Agiashvili was a novelist.

=== Acting career ===
In 1968, Agiashvili played the lead role of Dato in director Nikoloz Sanishvili's film Gangashi, appearing alongside Manana Tskhovrebova as Tsitsino, Gogi Kavtaradze as Karaman, and Leri Gaprindashvili as Bondo. Although it was the only film in which he appeared as an actor, the role left a lasting impression on Georgian audiences; a 2023 retrospective in Artinfo.ge described him as one of the most beloved faces in Georgian cinema on the strength of that single performance. A separate retrospective piece in Nostal.ge recalled his screen presence in the role as strikingly memorable and unlike the typical Soviet-era leading man of the time. Entertainment outlet PrimeTime.ge likewise noted that the 1968 role remained the performance for which he was best remembered by the public.

=== Career as writer, director, and producer ===
In 1974–1977, David worked as a story editor and later chief story editor of the animated association at the film studio Kartuli Pilmi (Georgia Movie). From 1977 to 1995, he was the story editor of the Georgian Television Movie company, becoming head of its scenario workshop from 1979.

In 1980-1985, the teacher at Tbilisi State University in Film Dramaturgy and at the Tbilisi Theatrical Institute in 'Fundamentals of film dramatic art'.

His script was used for the documentary Eksperimenti ("Experiment," 1979), which received the State Prize of Georgia. He was also the director and screenwriter of the documentary For Georgia, Boys, Stand Up Straight (1981).

Was a screenwriter of feature films and producer of documentaries: Fall of the Empire (1994), A Green Story (2012), Tbilisi, I Love You (2014).

In recent years, he had lived and worked in the US.

He was married to Marika Lomtatidze. His children are: Maia Agiashvili, Nika Agiashvili and George Finn.

David Agiashvili died on February 12, 2014, in Los Angeles, California, US. Later that same day, Tbilisi, I Love You — the film he had spent two years developing and producing, premiered in Tbilisi; the screening was dedicated to his memory.

== Awards ==
- State Prize of Georgia, for the documentary Eksperimenti (1979)

== Filmography ==
=== As producer ===
- The Tunnel King (executive producer)
- A Green Story (executive producer), 2012
- Tbilisi, I Love You (producer), 2014
- Fall of the Empire (producer), 1994

=== As actor ===
- The Harsh Life of Veronica Lambert, 2009, Dato (as Dato Agiashvili)
- Gangashi, 1968, Dato (as D. Agiashvili)

=== As writer ===
- Elsa (TV Movie), 1991
- It Snowed on Winter Gardens
- Twelfth Night, or What You Will
- Ali Baba and the 40 Thieves (1990), a Georgian SSR–Czechoslovak–West German co-production
- The Window
- Our Meri
- For Georgia, Boys, Stand Up Straight (documentary, director and screenwriter), 1981
