= Svetlana Novak =

Paris-based film producer

Svetlana Novak (born in 1952 in the former Yugoslavia) is a Paris-based film producer. Her credits include the films Delicatessen, The City of Lost Children, and Amélie. She has an extensive working relationship with the Serbian director Emir Kusturica having worked on Black Cat, White Cat, Underground, and Arizona Dream. Novak served two years as the producer for the Rentrée du Cinéma project, an initiative to make cinema more accessible to audiences by drastically reducing ticket prices. She is now part of the international Cities of Love project. Along with Gilles Caussade, she is leading the production team for the Marseille, je t'aime edition of the film.

== Cities of Love ==
Cities of Love is a series of motion pictures illustrating the universality of love in major cities around the world. Each episode is a collective feature film comprising no fewer than 10 segments created by separate directors. Three such pictures have already been completed: Paris, je t'aime in 2006, New York, I Love You in 2009, and Rio, Eu Te Amo (Rio, I Love You) in 2014. Episodes are planned for Shanghai, Jerusalem, Venice, Delhi, Marseille, Berlin and New Orleans.
