= Emmanuel Benbihy =

French film producer

Emmanuel Benbihy (born 6 November 1969, Paris) is a French film producer, best known for creating the Cities of Love series of films set in various cities around the world; most notable of those are Paris, je t'aime and New York, I Love You.

== Education ==
A graduate of Reims Management School, Emmanuel Benbihy demonstrates an early interest in art and international trade. During his studies, he displays a passion for contemporary painting and philosophy (art, law, nature), studies abroad and, while still in his teens, participates in the creation of a Parisian restaurant dedicated to classical music, the Opus Café. Several internships in the US and England give him a grounding in international marketing. This leads him to two years as main buyer for a Los Angeles import-export company specializing in fine foods. This period also gives him the opportunity to work with an independent film producer on the financial set-up of a feature film.

== Early work ==
In France in 1994, Benbihy spent over a year working on the co-development of European and Asian cinemas, while studying Japanese at the Langues'O. He also attended many foreign markets. His research was sent to the French Ministry of Foreign Affairs and the Centre National de la Cinématographie, and became his central theme of research at La Sorbonne University (Strategic Analysis in Cinema). This period of reflection on the industry of film was decisive: cinema needed to serve diversity and peace. He chose his profession: producing world films. Benbihy participated in a panel about the Future of Asian Cinema at the Busan International Film Festival in 1997 during which he claimed that the future of cinema would be in Asia, and more specifically in China. The same year, he joined an independent production company whose first project was an international collection of 12 feature films inspired by parables from the New Testament. For this non-denominational project, he represented the company in international markets and festivals, managing relations with the filmmakers, supervising script development, preparing international production and distribution agreements, and built a strong network of contacts and private investors. He raised a development fund, and took his first steps in the industry, collaborating with directors such as Peter Del Monte, Ermanno Olmi, Djibril Diop Mambety, Mira Nair, Liv Ullmann, Fernando Spiner, Im Kwon-taek ou Mikheil Kobakhidze.

== Cities of Love franchise ==
Cities of Love is a series of motion pictures illustrating the universality of love in major cities around the world. Each episode is a collective feature film composed of no fewer than 10 segments – created by directors from around the world.

Five such pictures have been completed: Paris, je t'aime in 2006, New York, I Love You in 2008, Tbilisi, I Love You and Rio, Eu Te Amo in 2014, and Berlin, I Love You in 2019. A number of films like "Rotterdam, I Love You", "Malmö, I Love You" and others have been in production for several years, though it is unclear whether they will be released or not.

Each segment's storyline must center on an encounter that bears the hope of love and takes place in the current time. Each segment must contain a strong presence of the illustrated city and a visual identification with the area selected by each director so that the audience may experience its singularity. All the segments shall be woven together by interstitial transitions placed before, between and after each of the segments. The transitions are directed by an additional director. The transitions involve some, if not all, of the characters created by the segment directors and at least one character, specifically created for the transitions, called the "recurrent character". The recurrent character must have an excuse to be found anywhere in the city at any time, and a good reason to connect or interact with any of the segments' characters. The recurrent character serves the unity of the film. The transitions, and the absence of credits inside the film, are essential to the unity and the fluidity of the overall experience. In a final scene, a narrative epilogue allows the audience to watch again some of the segments' characters of the film in a single unifying moment.

=== Paris, je t'aime ===
In April 2000, the development of the film Paris, je t'aime began with a simple idea: 20 arrondissements, 20 directors, 20 love encounters. Benbihy, along with co-executive producer Gilles Caussade determined a production timeline for the project, and little by little put together the principal elements needed for its development and production: narrative development, artistic and technical specifications, material to approach directors and talents, contracts, consistent marketing strategy and international approach to film financing. All these elements are today part of the Cities of Love franchise.

The production of Paris, je t'aime began in July 2005 and involved 24 international directors. The film was pre-sold in numerous territories at high levels, and opened the Cannes Film Festival 2006, Un Certain regard section. Directors such as the Coen brothers, Alexander Payne, Gus Van Sant, Alfonso Cuarón, Wes Craven, Walter Salles, Tom Tykwer, and actors such as Elijah Wood, Juliette Binoche, Willem Dafoe, Natalie Portman, Nick Nolte, Gena Rowlands, Gérard Depardieu participated in this film.

Paris, je t'aime was the opportunity to give some of the first lead roles on screen to Olga Kurylenko, Leïla Bekhti and Aïssa Maïga, and to produce the first short film of the Coen brothers.

=== New York, I Love You ===
Following Paris, je t'aime, New York, I Love You is the second episode of the Cities of Love series. Directors of the segments include Jiang Wen, Mira Nair, Shunji Iwai, Yvan Attal, Brett Ratner, Allen Hughes, Shekhar Kapur, Natalie Portman, Fatih Akın, Joshua Marston and Randy Balsmeyer. The film stars Bradley Cooper, Justin Bartha, Andy García, Hayden Christensen, Rachel Bilson, Natalie Portman, Irrfan Khan, Emilie Ohana, Orlando Bloom, Christina Ricci, Maggie Q, Ethan Hawke, Anton Yelchin, James Caan, Olivia Thirlby, Blake Lively, Drea de Matteo, Julie Christie, John Hurt, Shia LaBeouf, Uğur Yücel, Taylor Geare, Carlos Acosta, Jacinda Barrett, Shu Qi, Burt Young, Chris Cooper, Robin Wright Penn, Eva Amurri, Eli Wallach and Cloris Leachman.

In the Diamond District, an intercultural romantic fantasy transforms the purchase of a precious stone. Meanwhile, in Chinatown, a desperate artist pursues a reluctant muse. Within an Upper East Side hotel, a sophisticated guest and a mysterious bellboy journey outside of time. After an unexpected night in Central Park, a young man's prom date has a surprising revelation. Traveling towards the Village, two lovers speed by taxi, subway and foot to meet for the first time after what they thought was a one-night stand. In Tribeca, a pickpocket finds the tables turned when he follows an alluring girl. And in Brooklyn, a moment of Coney Island bliss envelops an octogenarian couple. These stories and more are all woven together to form a colorful, lyrical collage not only of the city – but of the deep yearning for love and human connections that sustain everyone within it.

New York, I Love You was the opportunity that gave Bradley Cooper's first lead role on screen, and also produced the first short films directed by Natalie Portman and Scarlett Johansson.

=== Tbilisi, I Love You ===
Six years after New York, I Love You, the third installment in the series was the 2014 Georgian movie Tbilisi, I Love You (Georgian: თბილისი, მიყვარხარ Tbilisi, miq’varkhar). The film consists of a series of 10 short films written and directed by natives of Georgia, and take on a personal narrative about the republic's capital city. Directors of the segments include Nika Agiashvili, Irakli Chkhikvadze, Levan Glonti, Alexander Kviria, Tako Shavgulidze, Kote Takaishvili and Levan Tutberidze. Malcolm McDowell and Ron Perlman both feature. McDowell's vignette centers on an actor who reluctantly agrees to a one-month shoot in Tbilisi and develops a love affair with the city. Perlman's short features him as a nameless American motorcyclist who rides through Tbilisi's remote areas with a woman named Freedom.

=== Rio, Eu Te Amo ===
The fourth film in the series, also released in 2014, was Rio, I Love You. The participating directors were Brazilians Carlos Saldanha, José Padilha, Andrucha Waddington and Fernando Meirelles, the Lebanese director Nadine Labaki, the Mexican screenwriter Guillermo Arriaga, the Australian director Stephan Elliott, the Italian director Paolo Sorrentino, the American actor and director John Turturro, and the South Korean director Im Sang-soo. The opening and closing sequences, plus the transitions were directed by Brazilian Vicente Amorim, while musician Gilberto Gil composed the theme song.

=== Berlin, I Love You ===
The fifth and last installment to date in the series was Berlin, I Love You, a joint German and U.S. production. It was released on 8 February 2019 in the United States, by Saban Films, and on 8 August 2019 in Germany, by Warner Bros. Pictures. Directors of the segment include Dianna Agron, Peter Chelsom, Fernando Eimbcke, Justin Franklin, Dennis Gansel, Dani Levy, Daniel Lwowski, Josef Rusnak, Til Schweiger, Massy Tadjedin and Gabriela Tscherniak. The film stars, among others, Helen Mirren, Keira Knightley, Mickey Rourke, Diego Luna, Jim Sturgess, Dianna Agron, Rafaëlle Cohen, Jenna Dewan, Toni Garrn, Sibel Kekilli, Hannelore Elsner, Robert Stadlober and Luke Wilson.
