= Caussade (surname) =

Caussade is a French surname. Notable people with the surname include:

- Alain Caussade (born 1952), French rugby player
- Georges Caussade (1873–1936), French composer, music theorist and educator
- Gilles Caussade (born 1947), French film producer
- Jean Pierre de Caussade (1675–1751), French Jesuit priest and writer

== See also ==
- Simone Plé-Caussade (1897–1986), French classical musician, composer and music educator
