= Nika Agiashvili =

Georgian-American writer and director

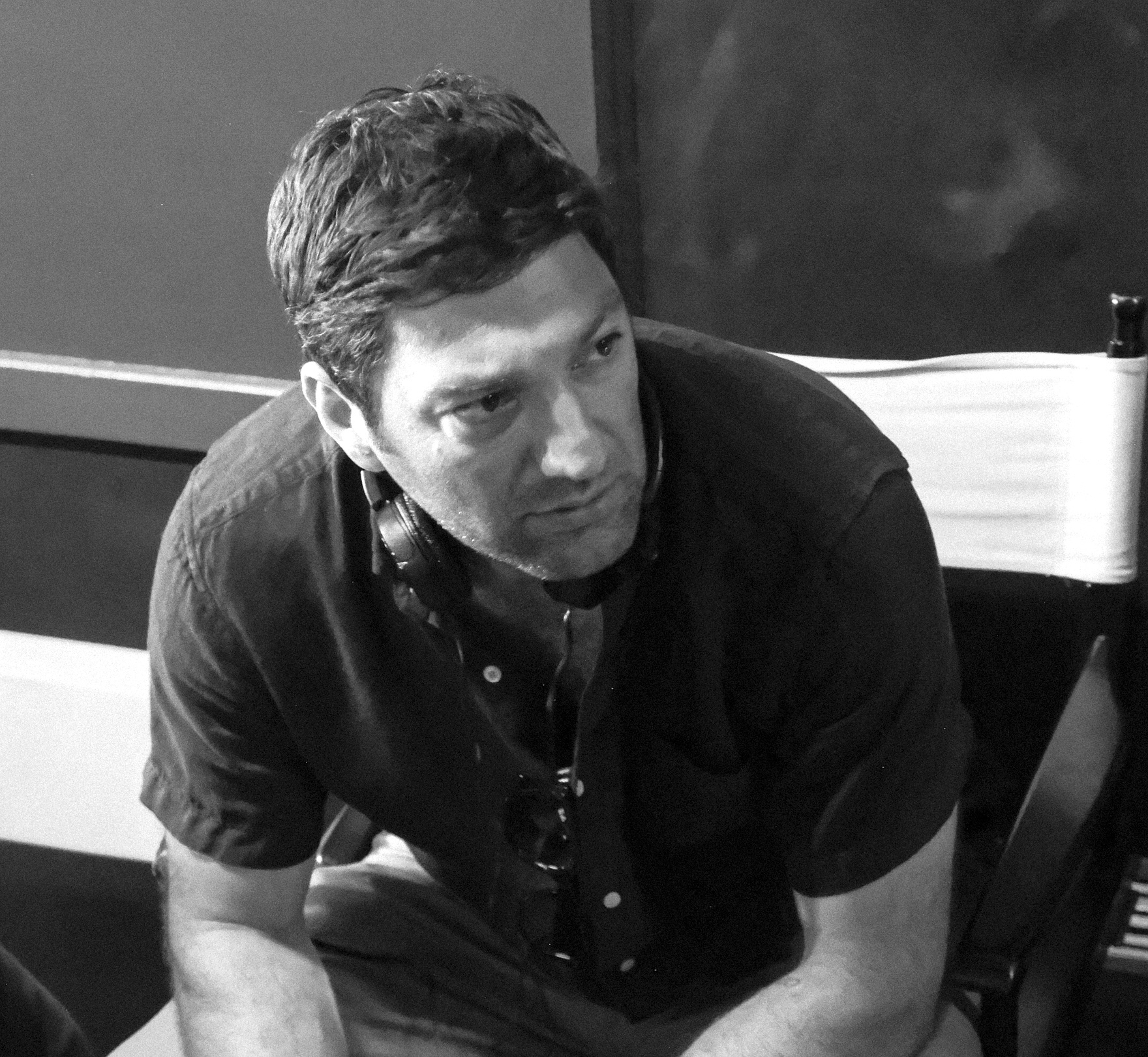
- Born: October 20, 1979 (age 47); Tbilisi, Georgia
- Occupations: Film director, screenwriter, film producer
- Spouse: Teona Gamtsemlidze
- Children: 2

Nika Agiashvili (born October 20, 1979) is a Georgian-American filmmaker, writer, director, and producer.

== Early life ==
Nika Agiashvili was born in Tbilisi, Georgia, into a family of writers and filmmakers. He is the son of filmmaker and screenwriter David Agiashvili and the grandson of writer Nikoloz Agiashvili. The Agiashvili surname is associated with a historic Georgian noble family from the Kingdom of Imereti, with documented records dating to the 17th century.

His father, David Agiashvili, was a Georgian film director, screenwriter, and producer who as a young man starred in the 1968 film Gangashi, a role that made him widely recognized and beloved across Georgia for the rest of his life.

Agiashvili's brother is actor George Finn, and his sister, Maia Agiashvili, was a film scholar and novelist whose debut novel, Just Slightly South of Paradise, was published and presented at the Writers' House of Georgia following her death.

== Personal life ==
Agiashvili's father, David Agiashvili, died on February 12, 2014, in Los Angeles. Later that same day, Tbilisi, I Love You — the film David had spent two years developing and producing with his son — premiered in Tbilisi; the screening was dedicated to his memory.

Agiashvili is married to Teona Gamtsemlidze, and the couple have two sons.

Agiashvili is a co-founder of Punch It Films, a production company he established with actor Michael Bisping, actor and producer George Finn, and producer and investor John Edward Lee.

== Career ==
In 2009, Nika Agiashvili wrote, produced and directed his first feature film, The Harsh Life of Veronica Lambert. His next project, A Green Story, was theatrically released worldwide in 2013. In 2014, Agiashvili wrote, directed and produced Tbilisi, I Love You as part of Emmanuel Benbihy's 'Cities of Love' franchise that started with Paris, je t'aime and New York, I Love You. In 2018, Agiashvili wrote and executive produced Daughter of the Wolf, released worldwide in 2019. It received three Canadian Screen Award nominations at the 8th Canadian Screen Awards in 2020, for Best TV Movie, Best Supporting Actor in a Television Drama Series or Program (Fehr) and Best Direction in a Television Drama Series or Program (Hackl). In 2021 Agiashvili wrote and directed the short film Delilah. In 2025, Agiashvili wrote, directed, and produced Atlas King, an action thriller starring Michael Bisping, Cuba Gooding Jr., George Finn, Sarah Wayne Callies, and Anne Winters. The film was the inaugural production of Punch It Films and was launched at the 2025 Cannes Film Festival. In 2026, Saban Films acquired the film's North American distribution rights from Highland Film Group, which handles worldwide sales.

== Filmography ==
Film

Year	Title	Director	Writer	Producer
2009	The Harsh Life of Veronica Lambert	Yes	Yes	Yes
2013	A Green Story	Yes	Yes	Yes
2014	Tbilisi, I Love You	Yes	Yes	Yes
2019	Daughter of the Wolf	Yes	Yes	Executive
2026	Atlas King	Yes	Yes	Yes

Short film

Year	Title	Director	Writer	Producer
2021	Delilah	Yes	Yes	Yes
