= Salaud, on t'aime =

- Film poster
- Directed by: Claude Lelouch
- Written by: Claude Lelouch; Valérie Perrin (collaboration)
- Produced by: Claude Lelouch
- Starring: Johnny Hallyday; Sandrine Bonnaire; Eddy Mitchell
- Cinematography: Robert Alazraki
- Edited by: Stéphane Mazalaigue
- Music by: Francis Lai; Christian Gaubert
- Production companies: Les Films 13; Rhône-Alpes Cinéma
- Distributed by: Les Films 13; Paname Distribution
- Release dates: 21 March 2014 (Mamers); 2 April 2014 (France)
- Running time: 124 minutes
- Country: France
- Language: French
- Budget: €8.4 million
- Box office: $2.6 million

Salaud, on t'aime ([salo ɔ̃ tɛm], translated as We Love You, You Bastard) is a 2014 French drama film directed, produced and co-written by Claude Lelouch. It stars Johnny Hallyday, Sandrine Bonnaire and Eddy Mitchell.

== Cast ==
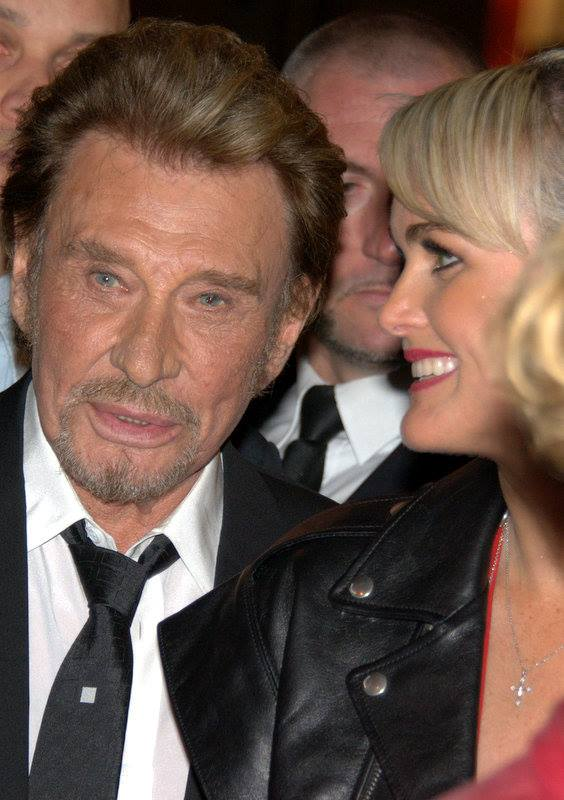
Johnny and Læticia Hallyday at the Mamers premiere of Salaud, on t'aime

- Johnny Hallyday as Jacques Kaminsky
- Sandrine Bonnaire as Nathalie Béranger
- Eddy Mitchell as Frédéric Saldmann
- Irène Jacob as Printemps Kaminsky
- Pauline Lefèvre as Été Kaminsky
- Sarah Kazemy as Automne Kaminsky
- Jenna Thiam as Hiver Kaminsky
- Valérie Kaprisky as Francia
- Isabelle de Hertogh as Isabelle
- Astrid Whettnall as Astrid
- Rufus as Le Ruf
- Agnès Soral as Bianca Kaminsky
- Silvia Kahn as Marie Selman
- Antoine Duléry as The new owner
- Jacky Ido as Jacky
- Jérôme Cachon as Joseph Picard
- Rafaëlle Cohen as Vocalist #1
- Victor Meutelet
