= Rafaëlle Cohen =

French actress, dancer and singer

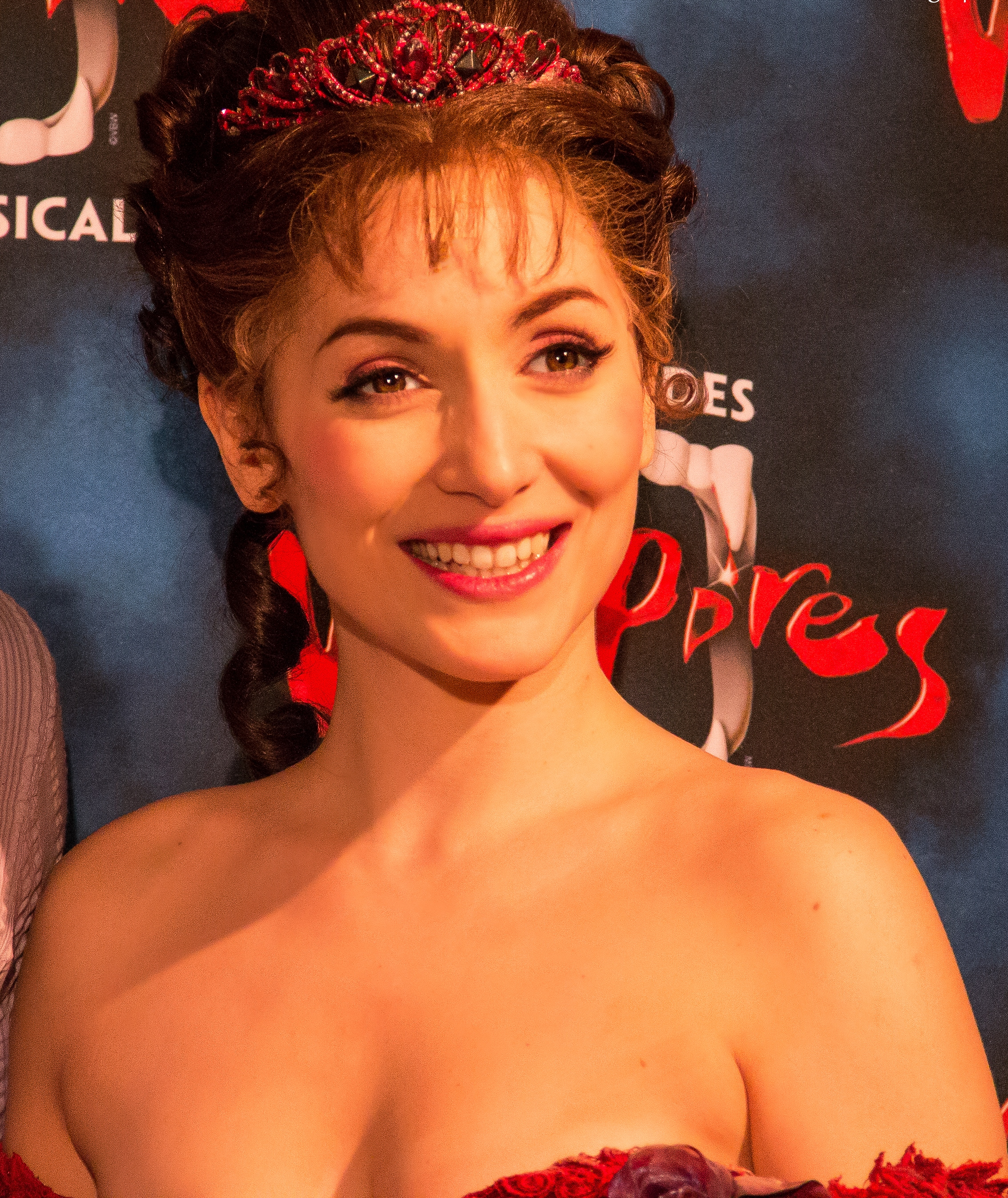
- Rafaëlle Cohen
- Born: 1985 (age 40–41); Paris, France
- Occupation: Actress
- Website: Official site

Rafaëlle Cohen (born 1985) is a French actress, dancer and singer. She is best known for starring in Le Bal des Vampires, the musical directed by Roman Polanski at the Theatre Mogador in Paris in 2014–2015.

== Life and career ==
Cohen was born in Paris and raised in London. Thanks to her father's work as a civil engineer, she traveled a lot in her childhood and studied singing and dancing in several countries, on top of school. In 2009 she obtained a double degree from École Centrale Paris and Polytechnic University of Milan as an engineer and an architect.

In 2011, she decided to become an actress and musical performer and has never stopped performing since, with appearances in La Belle au bois dormant, que veillent les fées (Sleeping Beauty), Sister Act, Dance of the Vampires.

In 2017, she portrayed the role of one of the Bimbettes in the Disney film Beauty and the Beast.

In 2019, she portrayed Sara in the American and German film Berlin, I Love You. She appeared as a lead character in the segment "Transitions", directed by Josef Rusnak. In 2021, she starred as Anne Boleyn, Queen of England, in the BBC docu-drama series The Boleyns: A Scandalous Family.

== Musicals ==
- 2018 : Wonderful Town (Leonard Bernstein) dir Olivier Bénézech, MD Larry Blank - French Première at the Opera de Toulon : Eileen
- 2016 : Mozart, l'opéra rock by Dove Attia and Albert Cohen - South Korea : Aloysia
- 2014-2015: Dance of the Vampires by Jim Steinman and Michael Kunze, dir Roman Polanski - Théâtre Mogador : Sarah
- 2014: La Légende d'Hélidote by Jérôme Lifszyc - Béliers Parisiens
- 2014: Kid Manoir 2 by Guillaume Beaujolais, Fred Colas, David Rozen, dir David Rozen - Palais des Glaces
- 2012-2013: Sister Act by Glenn Slater and Alan Menken, dir Carline Brouwer - Théâtre Mogador
- 2012: Kid Manoir by Guillaume Beaujolais, Aurélien Berda, Ida Gordon, Fred Colas, dir David Rozen - Avignon
- 2012-2013: La Belle au Bois Dormant que veillent les fées... by Marine André, dir by Florian Cléret - Marsoulan Paris
- 2011: La Vie parisienne by Jacques Offenbach, dir Anthony Michineau - Marsoulan Paris
- 2011: Exodus 47 by Gérard Layani - Centre Rachi Paris
- 2011: A la Vie à l'amour 2, dir Christophe Borie - Casino de Paris
- 2007: The Man Who Laughs from Victor Hugo, Student version - by Ludovic-Alexandre Vidal and Julien Salvia Adyar - Paris

== Discography ==
=== EP ===
- 2009: Opening
- 2010: Back to Life

=== Musicals' albums ===
- 2012: La Belle au bois dormant, que veillent les fées
- 2014: Sister Act le Musical
- 2017: Disney’s Beauty and the Beast Live Action

== Filmography ==
- 2019: Berlin I love you by Emmanuel Benbihy
- 2017: Beauty and the Beast by Bill Condon
- 2014: Salaud, on t'aime by Claude Lelouch
