= Frédéric Saldmann =

French cardiologist (born 1953)

- Born: Frédéric Gérard Saldmann; 5 May 1953 (age 73); Le Havre, France
- Education: University of Paris
- Occupations: Cardiologist, small business owner, author
- Children: 4

Frédéric Gérard Saldmann (born 5 May 1953) is a French cardiologist and physician of preventive medicine at the Hôpital Européen Georges-Pompidou. He has treated many actors, businessmen and politicians, including French President François Hollande. Through his consulting firm Sprim, he has advised The Coca-Cola Company, Danone and Nestlé on diet and gluten-free products. He is the author of twelve books on preventive medicine.

== Early life ==
Frédéric Saldmann was born on 5 May 1953 in Le Havre, France. His Polish grandfather worked in the textile industry. His parents owned a clothing store in Le Havre.

Saldmann studied cardiology at the University of Paris.

== Career ==
Saldmann started his career as a cardiologist. He subsequently became a physician of preventive medicine in private practice on the Place des Vosges. He later joined the Necker-Enfants Malades Hospital. In 1988, he founded Dietetica, a small business on healthy nutrition.

Saldmann is a physician at the Hôpital Européen Georges-Pompidou in Paris where he specializes in preventive medicine. He has treated businessmen like Jacques-Antoine Granjon and Bernard Tapie; politicians like Jack Lang and Olivier Dassault; author Alexandre Jardin; designer Alber Elbaz; filmmaker Roman Polanski; comedian Stéphane De Groodt; and actors like Claude Lelouch, Charlotte Rampling, Isabelle Adjani, and Sophie Marceau. He has also treated French President François Hollande at the Élysée Palace.

Saldmann is the founder of Sprim, a consulting firm through which he has advised The Coca-Cola Company, Danone and Nestlé on diet and gluten-free products. Additionally, he is the author of twelve books on preventive medicine. For example, in Le grand ménage, he recommends peeing and pooing as soon as the need comes, as well as burping after each meal, farting, perspiring and practicing sphincter muscle contractions while sitting . In La vie et le temps, he argues that 21 ejaculations a month lowers the risk of prostate cancer by a third.

Saldman acted as a physician in 24 Days, a 2014 film about the affair of the Gang of Barbarians, directed by Alexandre Arcady. He was also played by Eddy Mitchell in Claude Lelouch's Salaud, on t'aime.

== Personal life ==
Saldmann was married four times and has six children. He resides in central Paris with his wife Marie. They also own a former monastery in Deux-Sèvres.

== Selected works ==
- Saldmann, Frédéric (1997). Les nouveaux risques alimentaires. Paris: Le Grand livre du mois. OCLC 464054619.
- Saldmann, Frédéric (2008). On s'en lave les mains : tout connaître des nouvelles règles de l'hygiène. Paris: J'ai lu. ISBN 9782290007068. OCLC 946694300.
- Saldmann, Frédéric (2009). Le grand ménage : tout ce qu'il faut éliminer pour être en bonne santé. Paris: J'ai lu. ISBN 9782290015353. OCLC 470893933.
- Saldmann, Frédéric (2009). Les Petites Hontes. Paris: Flammarion. ISBN 9782081214897. OCLC 470930537.
- Bricaire, François; Saldmann, Frédéric (2009). Les nouvelles épidémies : comment s'en protéger?. Paris: Flammarion. ISBN 9782081238398. OCLC 937901030.
- Saldmann, Frédéric (2012). La vie et le temps : les nouveaux boucliers anti-âge. Paris: J'ai lu. ISBN 9782290042229. OCLC 807726178.
- Saldmann, Frédéric (2013). Le Meilleur Médicament c'est vous. Paris: Albin Michel. ISBN 9782226245366. OCLC 855890649.
- Saldmann, Frédéric (2015). Prenez votre santé en main !. Paris: Albin Michel. ISBN 9782226343871. OCLC 937885518.
- Saldmann, Frédéric (2017). Votre santé sans risque – vous êtes une force de la nature sans le savoir. Paris: Albin Michel. ISBN 9782226324788. OCLC 973800355.
