= List of Disney's Beauty and the Beast characters =

Several of Beauty and the Beast's main characters. From left to right: Lumière, Cogsworth, Chip, Mrs. Potts, and Babette. Belle and the Beast are seen in the background.

Various characters have been featured in Disney's Beauty and the Beast franchise. This list includes those from the 1991 animated film, its direct-to-video follow-up, a short story collection, the stage musical adaptation, and the 2017 live-action and computer animation remake.

== Casting information ==
Character	Beauty and the Beast (1991)	The Enchanted Christmas (1997)	Belle's Magical World (1998)	Mickey's Magical Christmas: Snowed in at the House of Mouse (2001)	House of Mouse (2001-2002)	Beauty and the Beast (2017)
Belle	Paige O'Hara	Paige O'Hara	Paige O'Hara	Paige O'Hara	Jodi Benson	Emma Watson
Beast/Prince	Robby Benson	Robby Benson	Robby Benson	Robby Benson	Robby Benson	Dan Stevens
Gaston	Richard White				Richard White	Luke Evans
Lumière	Jerry Orbach	Jerry Orbach	Jerry Orbach	Maurice LaMarche	Jerry Orbach	Ewan McGregor
Cogsworth	David Ogden Stiers	David Ogden Stiers	David Ogden Stiers	David Ogden Stiers	David Ogden Stiers	Ian McKellen
Mrs. Potts	Angela Lansbury	Angela Lansbury	Anne Rogers	Silent role	Silent role	Emma Thompson
Chip	Bradley Pierce	Haley Joel Osment	Gregory Grudt	Silent Role	Tress MacNeille	Nathan Mack
Maurice	Rex Everhart	Silent Role			Corey Burton	Kevin Kline
Le Fou	Jesse Corti				Cameo	Josh Gad
Wardrobe	Jo Anne Worley _{(unnamed)}		Jo Anne Worley _{(unnamed)}		Silent Role	Audra McDonald _{(as Madame de Garderobe)}
Featherduster	Kimmy Robertson _{(unnamed)}	Cameo	Kimmy Robertson _{(as Fifi)}	Silent Role	Kimmy Robertson _{(as Babette)}	Gugu Mbatha-Raw _{(as Plumette)}
Enchantress	Silent role	Kath Soucie				Hattie Morahan; Rita Davies _{(beggar disguise)}
Monsieur D'Arque	Tony Jay					Adrian Schiller
Maestro		Tim Curry _{(as Forte)}				Stanley Tucci _{(as Cadenza)}
Chef	Brian Cummings _{(unnamed)}		Jim Cummings _{(as Bouche)}			Clive Rowe _{(as Cuisinier)}
Bookseller	Alvin Epstein					Ray Fearon _{(as Pere Robert)}
Fife		Paul Reubens				
Angelique		Bernadette Peters				
Webster			Jim Cummings			
Le Plume			Rob Paulsen			
Crane			Jeff Bennett			
Chandeleria			April Winchell			
Bimbettes	Mary Kay Bergman; Kath Soucie				Kath Soucie	Sophie Reid; Rafaëlle Cohen; Carla Nella
Jean Potts						Gerard Horan
Clothilde						Haydn Gwynne
Coat Rack	Silent role _{(unnamed)}					Thomas Padden _{(as Chappeau)}
Phillipe	Hal Smith	Frank Welker				Rusty
Footstool	Frank Welker _{(unnamed)}	Frank Welker _{(as Sultan)}	Frank Welker _{(as Sultan)}		Frank Welker _{(as Sultan)}	Gizmo _{(as Froufrou)}

== Introduced in Beauty and the Beast ==
=== Maurice ===
Maurice
- First appearance: Beauty and the Beast (1991)
- Portrayed by: Eric Keenleyside (Once Upon a Time); Kevin Kline (live-action film)
- Voiced by: Rex Everhart
- Occupation: Inventor

Maurice is the village inventor and Belle's father. However, most of the villagers think he is insane for crafting devices believed ridiculous and impossible to construct in reality.

During the beginning of the film, he is working on a machine that automatically chops up firewood. Once it is successfully working, he leaves for the County Fair to display his invention. However, he is unable to make it to the fair due to getting lost in the woods. After going down a path that results in the loss of his horse and cart, and being attacked and nearly killed by a pack of rabid wolves, he winds up at the gate of a dark castle. When he enters the castle to stay for the night, he ends up being locked up by the Beast, the castle's master.

Belle learns of what happened and goes to the castle, attempting to release her father. She then tries to convince the Beast to release him from the castle. She succeeds in convincing the Beast to release him, under the condition that she is to take her father's place, to Maurice's protests. Maurice is forcibly taken back to the village.

Upon returning to the village, Maurice tries to seek the villagers' help in trying to rescue Belle, but they don't believe him, and they consequently throw him out of the tavern.

Determined to not give up on Belle, he decides to return to the castle alone. However, it doesn't take long before he succumbs to an unknown illness due to the cold weather. Luckily, Belle discovers that her father is in trouble via the Beast's Magic Mirror and is released by the Beast so she can save him. Shortly after arriving back home, Le Fou has alerted the villagers of their return. Shortly thereafter, Monsieur D'Arque, the keeper of the Maison de Lunes Insane Asylum, and the other villagers come to take Maurice to the insane asylum in an intricate plan to blackmail Belle into marrying Gaston. Belle reveals that Maurice's rants are true and that the Beast does exist. Both she and Maurice are locked up by Gaston in the cellar, to stop them from interfering with Gaston's goal to kill the Beast. Chip has managed to stow away in Belle's satchel and uses the automated firewood cutter to destroy the door to the cellar. Maurice and Belle leave for the castle to stop Gaston from killing the Beast. He is last seen in the ballroom standing by Mrs. Potts as he happily watches Belle and the Beast (who is now transformed back into a handsome prince) dance while he laughs at Chip's question to his mother whether he still has to 'stay in the cupboard'.

In the 2017 live-action remake, Maurice is played by Kevin Kline. He remains as an inventor, but makes music boxes to help Belle see the world from the comfort of home in the village of Villeneuve. He fled Paris and settled in the provinces with Belle when she was still a baby to protect the both of them from a plague that took the life of Belle's mother and Maurice's wife. True to the original story, Maurice is imprisoned by the Beast for taking a rose from his garden instead of being caught trespassing in the castle. Maurice returns to Villeneuve to find help, but only Gaston and LeFou are willing to do so. However, Gaston only wanted to help in order to get Maurice's blessing for his marriage to Belle. Knowing that Belle has no interest in marrying Gaston, Maurice refuses her hand, prompting Gaston to leave him to die at the hands of the wolves. The Enchantress, disguised as a villager named Agathe, rescues him and takes him back to Villeneuve. Upon his return, Maurice attempts to have Gaston arrested for attempted murder, but Gaston in turn declares him insane and has him committed to an insane asylum. Belle arrives back in time to vindicate Maurice, but both are locked in the asylum wagon while the whole village goes to kill the Beast. After Maurice and Belle make amends regarding Belle now understanding why Maurice was so overly protective of her, thanks to the Beast, Maurice uses his inventor skills to pick the lock on the wagon, allowing Belle to take Phillipe back to the Beast's castle while Maurice remains behind with the dumbfounded Monsieur D'Arque. At the end of the film, Maurice is seen painting the ballroom dance as everyone celebrates which is briefly witnessed by Mrs. Potts before she dances with her husband.

Maurice makes a cameo in Beauty and the Beast: The Enchanted Christmas as one of the people listening to the story Mrs. Potts is telling.

Maurice makes his debut appearance in the Kingdom Hearts series in Kingdom Hearts χ.

=== Lumière ===
Lumière
- First appearance: Beauty and the Beast (1991)
- Portrayed by: Henri Lubatti (Once Upon a Time); Ewan McGregor (live-action film)
- Voiced by: Jerry Orbach (films, House of Mouse); Jeff Bennett (Kingdom Hearts II, theme parks, Chip 'n Dale: Rescue Rangers film, Disney Dreamlight Valley); Ewan McGregor (live-action film); Masashi Ebara (Japanese)
- Occupation: Maître d' (animated film); Footman (live-action film)

Lumière is the Beast's kindhearted but rebellious maître d' and Cogsworth's counterpart and rival. Because of the curse placed by the Enchantress, he was transformed into a candelabra. He allows Maurice to come into the castle to stay. Later, he and Cogsworth lure Belle to Maurice in hopes that she will break the spell. He suggests that the Beast try and move her to a better room. Lumière tries to help the Beast become more civil for Belle, and sometimes rebels against the Beast if it suits the other characters' needs (like allowing Belle to have dinner despite Beast's refusal to let them feed her). Later, after the Beast rescues Belle from more wolves, and Belle nurses the Beast back to health, earning his affections in the process, Lumière, aware of what would impress such a voracious reader, astutely suggests that the Beast give Belle the castle's immense library as a gift, which has the desired effect. He also tries to help the Beast learn how to do the waltz. He is initially upset that Belle leaves the castle, but he remains optimistic at the same time, since he's still convinced that she'll break the spell. When he discovers that the castle is going to be invaded by Gaston's lynch mob, he plans the battle. He then decides to set up a trap where all of the furniture is in the foyer, and he gives the signal to attack. While he is unable to stop Gaston from deserting the battle to kill the Beast, Lumière rescues Fifi the Featherduster from being plucked apart by one of Gaston's friends and is earlier himself rescued by Cogsworth from Lefou. He, Cogsworth, and Mrs. Potts rush to aid the Beast who is fighting against Gaston, but arrive after the battle's end, when the Beast dies from a mortal wound from Gaston, who fell to his death from the West Wing. The spell breaks, however, reviving the Beast as a human and returning Lumière and the others to their original forms. In the end, he gets into an argument with Cogsworth about who told who about Belle breaking the spell (it was Lumière).

In The Enchanted Christmas, he tries to help bring Christmas back into the castle (even if it means disobeying his Master to do so). Also, he and Cogsworth help get a Christmas tree with Belle upon Forte's suggestion (unaware of Forte's plan). When Forte decides to try to destroy the castle, he and Cogsworth try to save the rose.

He later appears in Kingdom Hearts II and Kingdom Hearts 358/2 Days as a supporting character in the Beast's Castle world. In 358/2 Days, he and Cogsworth serve as the castle's patrol guards, forcing Roxas, Xion, and Xaldin to evade their sight during missions in that world. In Kingdom Hearts II, he is locked in the dungeon by the Beast along with the other servants in an attempt to protect him by the Beast's rage, fueled by Xaldin, but he is freed by Sora, whom he helps by opening a secret passage out of the undercroft.

Lumière is voiced by Ewan McGregor in the live-action version of Beauty and the Beast. This depiction of Lumiere has him as a charismatic footman who has been transformed into a human-shaped candelabrum with a bronze human-like face, arms tipped with candles and legs to walk with as well. Despite the differences, Lumiere's design as a candelabra with three branches still remains only by shape shifting and can be self litten. He is lover of Plumette, who has been transformed into a feather duster.

=== Cogsworth ===
Cogsworth
- First appearance: Beauty and the Beast (1991)
- Portrayed by: Ian McKellen (live-action film)
- Voiced by: David Ogden Stiers (animated films); Ian McKellen (live-action film); Bob Joles (Once Upon a Studio); Piotr Michael (Disney Dreamlight Valley); Kazuo Kumakura (Japanese)
- Full name: Henry Cogsworth (live-action film)
- Occupation: Majordomo

Cogsworth is the Beast's tightly wound and extremely loyal Majordomo, and Lumière's counterpart and rival. When the Enchantress curses the Beast, he is transformed into a pendulum clock. He initially tries to stop the others from allowing Maurice to stay at the castle (as he knows the Beast would not approve), but ultimately gives in. When the Beast arrives, he tries to explain what happened, but the Beast is too angry to listen. He tries to get Belle to come to dinner, but she refuses. When he reports her refusal to the Beast, he tries desperately to calm him down, as well as keep him calm when trying to get her to join him for dinner. He follows the Beast's orders to deny her dinner, but he eventually relents, telling them to at least keep the noise down. He is eventually swept up in the boisterous "Be Our Guest" number. Later he learns that the Beast let Belle go, much to his dismay. He then tells everyone the bad news, and seems resigned to his fate (as the rose is nearing the last petal). When the residents of the castle learn of the upcoming invasion, he tries to come up with a plan to stop the villagers, but the others leave him before he can finish. He later participates in the battle and rescues Lumiere from Le Fou by sliding down the banister and prodding Le Fou's rear end with a pair of scissors. He, Lumiere and Mrs. Potts rush to aid the Beast who is fighting against Gaston, but arrive after the battle's end, when the Beast dies from a mortal wound from Gaston, who fell from the West Wing. The spell breaks, however, reviving the Beast and returning Cogsworth and the others to their original forms. In the end, he gets into an argument with Lumiere about who told who about Belle breaking the spell (it was Lumiere).

In The Enchanted Christmas, he is initially opposed to the idea of Christmas (mainly due to his master's opposition), but eventually decides that Christmas in the castle wouldn't be such a bad idea. He and Lumière try to help Belle find a Christmas tree under Forte's guidance, unaware of Forte's plans. Later, when Forte tries to destroy the castle, he attempts to save the rose.

He later appears in Kingdom Hearts II and Kingdom Hearts: 358/2 Days in his homeworld, Beast's Castle. In the latter, he serves as a patrol guard in the castle, and in the former, he aids Sora in the brief fight against the Beast, under Xaldin's influence. He later plays a small role in the final battle against Xaldin.

Cogsworth is voiced by Ian McKellen in the live-action version of Beauty and the Beast. This version has a wife named Clothilde. In the ending, he is reunited with Clothilde after he transforms back into a human, much to his dismay. It is revealed that this version's first name is Henry.

=== Mrs. Potts ===
Mrs. Potts
- First appearance: Beauty and the Beast (1991)
- Portrayed by: Emma Thompson (live-action film)
- Voiced by: Angela Lansbury (first and second films); Anne Rogers (Belle's Magical World); Emma Thompson (live-action film); Tress MacNeille (May the 12th Be with You)
- Occupation: Head housekeeper

Mrs. Potts is Chip's mother and the castle's head housekeeper and has a loving, motherly feel. When the Enchantress curses the Beast, she is transformed into a teapot. In her first appearance, she helps Maurice get comfortable. She helps comfort Belle when she is made to stay at the castle in exchange for her father's freedom. Mrs. Potts also tries to help the Beast try to become more civil to Belle, although the efforts fall apart when Belle refuses to come to dinner. Later, Mrs. Potts entertains Belle when she's having dinner. When the Beast is wounded, she tries to tend to his wounds with Belle. After learning that there are invaders coming to the castle, she tries to get the Beast to do something, but he declines, still depressed about Belle leaving. She later participates in the battle of the castle by having the rest of the dishes pour hot liquid on the villagers.

In The Enchanted Christmas, she serves as the narrator of the tale. She later appears in Kingdom Hearts II in her homeworld, Beast's Castle. She aids Sora, Lumiere and Cogsworth in opening the secret passage out of the dungeons by extinguishing the darkness surrounding the lanterns with the help of Sora's Keyblade.

Angela Lansbury, who had been known for playing "despicable" characters throughout her Broadway career, noted that in the aftermath of her film role as Mrs. Potts, children no longer hid behind their parents in fear when around her, and instead treated her like a heroine.

Mrs. Potts is portrayed by Emma Thompson in the live-action version of Beauty and the Beast. During the final battle, she recognizes the potter Mr. Potts among the villagers storming the castle and is reunited with him after she transforms back into a human. It is then revealed that her first name is Beatrice. This version of Mrs. Potts is much younger than her 1991 counterpart.

=== Chip Potts ===
Chip Potts
- First appearance: Beauty and the Beast (1991)
- Portrayed by: Nathan Mack (live-action film)
- Voiced by: Bradley Pierce (first film); Haley Joel Osment (second film); Gregory Grudt (Belle's Magical World); Tress MacNeille (4 episodes of House of Mouse); Nikita Hopkins (1 episode of House of Mouse); Nathan Mack (live-action film)

Chip is the son of Mrs. Potts. As a result of the Enchantress' spell, he is transformed into a teacup, with a small crack on the rim. He befriends Belle and looks up to her. He gets admonished by his mother when he does a bubble trick to Belle and when he giggles at how the Beast handles a spoon. Also, he stows away when she has to leave the castle to save her father Maurice, and wants to find out why she left. He later frees Belle and Maurice, who are trapped in the cellar by Gaston, by commandeering Maurice's invention, an automatic firewood chopper, to break open the cellar door but destroying the invention in the process.

In Beauty and the Beast: The Enchanted Christmas, he is seen trying to open presents for Christmas. Also when Adam gives him a present, he's excited about it being a storybook. He helps Belle make a storybook to make the Beast feel better. Also, in the flashback depicting the Enchantress placing the spell on the castle ten years earlier, he is present as a child, implying that the spell stopped him and the other servants from aging during the ten-year period.

He cameos in Kingdom Hearts II.

In the live-action version of Beauty and the Beast, Chip is portrayed by Nathan Mack. He is transformed into a teacup with a matching saucer, often using the saucer to move around quickly. When the Enchantress's curse on the kingdom is not broken in time, Chip and all the other castle servants lose their last vestiges of humanity and become completely inanimate. Before Chip drops to the ground lifeless, his teacup form is saved at the last instant by an ailing Chapeau who is transformed into a lifeless coat rack. Shortly afterwards, the spell on the kingdom is broken and Chip along with the other servants are restored to their human forms. He and his mother are reunited with Mr. Potts.

=== Featherduster ===
The Featherduster
- First appearance: Beauty and the Beast (1991)
- Portrayed by: Gugu Mbatha-Raw (live-action film)
- Voiced by: Kimmy Robertson (films, House of Mouse); Gugu Mbatha-Raw (live-action film)
- Aliases: Babette (musical, House of Mouse); Fifi (Belle's Magical World); Marie (The New Adventures of Beauty and the Beast); Plumette (live-action film)
- Occupation: Maid

The Featherduster is a maid of the castle, who is also Lumière's girlfriend. She is transformed into a feather duster by the Enchantress' spell. She appears in Beauty and the Beast and Belle's Magical World. She also makes a cameo in Beauty and the Beast: The Enchanted Christmas. There have been some changes to her name throughout the different shows produced; in the musical as well as House of Mouse, she is called Babette; in the Disney Comics prequel comic serial The New Adventures of Beauty and the Beast, she is named Marie; and in Belle's Magical World, she is called Fifi.

In the Belle's Magical World segment, "Fifi's Folly", Fifi misunderstands Belle as Lumière's new girlfriend when Belle helps him rehearse for his 5th Anniversary date with Fifi. However, in the end of the segment, Lumière tells her he loves her after a series of events and they get back together again.

The Featherduster is voiced by Kimmy Robertson in Beauty and the Beast and Belle's Magical World, but no actress is credited for her single line in The Enchanted Christmas. She also appeared in House of Mouse and Mickey's Magical Christmas: Snowed in at the House of Mouse, again voiced by Robertson but this time was called Babette.

In the 2017 live-action film, she is portrayed by Gugu Mbatha-Raw and is called Plumette. She was transformed into a swan-shaped feather duster and played a bigger part in the film.

=== Sultan ===
Sultan
- First appearance: Beauty and the Beast (1991)
- Portrayed by: Gizmo (live-action film)
- Voiced by: Frank Welker (animated films)
- Species: Mongrel (animated film); Yorkshire Terrier (live-action film)

Sultan is the castle mongrel who was turned into a footstool when the Enchantress enacted her curse.

When Maurice first appeared at the castle, he is among those who meet him and tries to get Maurice to pet him. Then Sultan gets in front of Maurice so that he can put his feet up. During Belle's stay at the castle, Sultan plays in the snow and even gets hugged by Belle. At the time when Gaston leads the villagers into laying siege to the Beast's castle, Sultan takes part in the fight. When he is chased into the kitchen and cornered by LeFou and two of Gaston's four stooges, Chef Bouche and the knives help him by scaring Lefou, Tom, and Stanley away. After Belle broke the Enchantress' spell, Sultan was among those who were restored to normal.

In Beauty and the Beast: The Enchanted Christmas, Sultan is among those present when they hear Mrs. Potts' story about last Christmas.

In the live-action film, Sultan is renamed Frou-Frou and portrayed by Gizmo. He is apparently the Yorkshire Terrier of Madame de Garderobe and Maestro Cadenza.

=== The Wardrobe ===
Wardrobe
- First appearance: Beauty and the Beast (1991)
- Portrayed by: Audra McDonald (live-action film)
- Voiced by: Jo Anne Worley (animated film); Audra McDonald (live-action film)
- Aliases: Amoire; Grande Bouche; Garderobe
- Title: Madame
- Occupation: Lady-in-waiting

The Wardrobe is a former opera singer and lady-in-waiting who was turned into a wardrobe. The character of Wardrobe was introduced by visual development person Sue C. Nichols to the then entirely male cast of servants, and was originally a more integral character named "Madame Armoire". Her role was later expanded upon and ultimately taken over by Mrs. Potts. Wardrobe is known as "Madame de la Grande Bouche" in the stage adaptation of the film. Her stage name supposedly means "Mistress of the Big Mouth" in a semi-literal English translation. The Marvel Comics serial for the film, taking place during the film's events, referred to her status as an opera singer that performed even to the king.

She later appears in Kingdom Hearts II in her homeworld, Beast's Castle. In the game, she blocks Sora's way to the undercroft to free the servants from the dungeon, forcing Sora to push her out of the way while she is sleeping. As in the film, she is Belle's closest confidante in the castle after Lumiere.

In the 2017 live-action remake, the Wardrobe is portrayed by Audra McDonald and is known as Madame de Garderobe, a virtuosic opera singer, and wife of court composer Maestro Cadenza. The Enchantress' curse separated her from her husband, and as the rose withered, she was prone to dozing off more often as she became more inanimate. After the Enchantress lifts the curse and restores everyone to human form, Garderobe is reunited with her husband and sings at the celebratory ball at the end of the film while holding her dog Frou-Frou.

=== LeFou ===
LeFou
- First appearance: Beauty and the Beast (1991)
- Portrayed by: Josh Gad (live-action film)
- Voiced by: Jesse Corti

LeFou (occasionally also spelled as "Le Fou"; French for "The Madman", and also a phonetic pun on "The Fool") is a local villager who is Gaston's bumbling-but-loyal sidekick (and punching bag); he is often mistreated by Gaston, but he doesn't seem to mind. He seems unsure about Gaston marrying Belle (thinking that she and her father, Maurice, are "crazy"), but helps him anyway. During the attempted wedding, he acts as a conductor to signal the playing of a fast tempo version on "Here Comes the Bride". Later, when Gaston comes up with a plan to arrange for Maurice to be sent to the insane asylum to force Belle to marry him, they head to Belle's house, but both she and Maurice are gone. Gaston decides to have LeFou stay near the house and let him know when they return, much to LeFou's chagrin. After a while, when Belle brings Maurice home, LeFou alerts Gaston so he can put his plan into action. After learning that the Beast exists, he accompanies Gaston and the rest of the lynch mob to the castle to kill the Beast singing "The Mob Song" with everybody. He picks up Lumière upon entering the castle, and Lumiere's signal begins the battle. During the battle, LeFou attempts to murder Lumiere by waving a torch, perilously close to Lumiere's head, but unfortunately for Lefou, Cogsworth shows up to rescue Lumiere by jabbing his scissors hard in LeFou's rear end. He is last seen escaping with the rest of the villagers.

In the 2017 live-action adaptation, LeFou is portrayed by Josh Gad. In the version with Gad, the character is gay, becoming the first homosexual in a Disney film. This version is also portrayed in a sympathetic manner, becoming visibly uncomfortable with Gaston's behavior as the latter becomes more unhinged and villainous over the film's course. In one scene, LeFou helped Gaston to break up the headmaster leading the villagers into destroying Belle's laundry invention by shooting the gun in the air twice with the second time having a cow accidentally killed. Unlike in the original 1991 animated film during the fight at the Beast's castle, he saves Mrs. Potts when she falls from the chandelier and switches sides to helping the Beast's servants after Gaston abandons him while he takes a beating from the servants. One deleted scene had him given a bad encounter with Monsieur Toilette which causes him to run out of the room he was in. In another deleted scene following the spell being broken, LeFou runs into Monsieur Toilette's true form which identified from the bathroom smell. At the end of this version, he briefly dances with (the presumably gay) Stanley, who was also a friend and minion of Gaston's.

=== Monsieur D'Arque ===
Monsieur D'Arque
- First appearance: Beauty and the Beast (1991)
- Portrayed by: Adrian Schiller (live-action film)
- Voiced by: Tony Jay

In-universe information
- Occupation: Insane asylum proprietor

Monsieur D'Arque is the owner of the local insane asylum, the Maison de Lunes. Gaston bribes him to take part in a scheme to blackmail Belle into marrying him in which D'Arque will threaten to have Belle's rather eccentric father Maurice sent to the madhouse. He does get impressed with Gaston's scheme. After Belle returns from the Beast's castle, Monsieur D'Arque appears to collect Maurice as Gaston, Le Fou, and most of the villagers are present. However, Belle stops him when she proves her father's sanity by revealing the Beast's existence to the villagers with the magic mirror.

He also appears in the 2017 version. He only appears after Gaston demands that Maurice be put into the asylum and also tries to lock up both Maurice and Belle on Gaston's orders while being told to make sure they don't get out. Monsieur D'Arque is dumbfounded when he discovers that the two had managed to escape. As Belle rides off, Maurice asks a dumbfounded Monsieur D'Arque if he has children.

=== The Triplets ===
Claudette, Laurette, and Paulette
- First appearance: Beauty and the Beast (1991)
- Portrayed by: Sophie Reid (Eliana); Rafaëlle Cohen (Elise); Carla Nella (Eloïse)
- Voiced by: Kath Soucie (Paulette [1991 film]; all characters [subsequent appearances]); Mary Kay Bergman (Claudette and Laurette [1991 film])

The Triplets, also known as the "Bimbettes", are a trio of glamorous blonde women who fawn over Gaston. The real names of the girls are Claudette, who wears a red dress, Laurette, who wears yellow dress, and Paulette, who wears a green dress. They think Belle is crazy when they see her refusing Gaston's advances. They are also upset when Gaston decides to marry Belle, as they are seen crying when he is announcing that he will propose to Belle. They are later seen comforting and fawning over Gaston in the bar. The end of the Gaston song implies that they acted as waitresses in the tavern due to Paulette being seen with a silver platter.

The triplets also appear in the Marvel Comics serial for Beauty and the Beast, which was set during Belle's stay at the castle. They are generally within the B-stories, where they try to sabotage Gaston's plans to marry Belle, with varying success.

In the musical, their roles are the same, although they are named as "The Silly Girls" and are given more dialogue, and their role is expanded slightly.

They have made regular appearances on House of Mouse. They are now all voiced by Kath Soucie (who originally only voiced Paulette), due to the death of Mary Kay Bergman, who originally voiced Claudette and Laurette.

They also appear in the 2017 live-action remake. Although their overall roles were the same, the triplets were given a significantly different appearance, where they wore similarly colored pink dresses, and possessed heavy makeup, a beauty spot, and brunette hair, as well as explicitly disliking Belle (Bill Condon and Rafaëlle Cohen both indicated the triplets' dislike of Belle dealt with their own mom neglecting them and doting on the latter). They are also depicted as being more haughty and vain. Their occupations also changed, acting as seamstresses with their mother in the remake. The three of them are among the villagers that accompany Gaston to the Beast's castle to kill the Beast where they end up fighting the servants. A deleted scene had them chasing Frou-Frou into the kitchen where Cuisiner threw molasses on them.

=== Gaston's Buddies ===
Tom, Dick, Stanley, and Gramps
- First appearance: Beauty and the Beast (1991)
- Portrayed by: Jimmy Johnston (Tom); Dean Street (Dick); Alexis Loizon (Stanley)
- Voiced by: Jack Angel (Tom); Phil Proctor (Dick); Bill Farmer (Stanley); Patrick Pinney (Gramps)

Tom, Dick, Stanley, and Gramps, also known as Gaston's Buddies, are a quartet of local men who are close friends of Gaston and Le Fou. Along with Le Fou, they look up to Gaston the most out of the rest of the village as a leader and function as his gang. In the 1991 animated film, Tom is short, fat, and balding, Dick is middle-sized and thin, Stanley is large and husky, and Gramps is elderly with gray hair. During the fight at the castle, Gramps was dressed in girl clothes by the Wardrobe and two other servants while Tom, Dick, and Stanley chased Sultan into the kitchen where they were driven off by Chef Bouche and the knives.

In the 2017 live-action adaptation, Gramps is absent (though assumed to possibly be a background villager), and Tom, Dick, and Stanley all have similar physiques. During the fight at the castle, Madame de Garderobe dressed them in female clothes that left only Stanley impressed. After the spell was broken, Stanley was seen dancing with Le Fou.

=== The Baker ===
The Baker
- First appearance: Beauty and the Beast (1991)
- Portrayed by: Dale Branston
- Voiced by: Alec Murphy

In-universe information
- Occupation: Baker

The Baker is the head of a bakery in the village that Belle lived in. He says good morning to Belle and asks where Belle is off to. When Belle states that she is on her way to the bookstore to return a book about a beanstalk and an ogre, the Baker quotes "That's nice" and shouts into the bakery for Marie to hurry up with the baguettes. The Baker later provides the birthday cake for Gaston's wedding proposal for Belle which doesn't go well. After Belle returned from the Beast's castle, the Baker is among the villagers gathered by Gaston at the time when Gaston as Monsieur D'Arque comes to collect Maurice. After Belle uses the Beast's mirror to show that the Beast exists, the Baker is among the villagers that accompany Gaston and Le Fou to the Beast's Castle to kill the Beast only for the villagers to be fended off by the transformed servants.

In the Princess Adventure Stories: Belle and the Mysterious Monster, the Baker was named Monsieur Le Pain.

In the live-action film, Belle is seen during the first song buying one of the Baker's foods and his discussion to Belle was transferred to Jean Potts. The Baker was seen when the Headmaster had roused the villagers into destroying Belle's laundry invention after the Headmaster caught Belle teaching a girl how to read. Like the animated film, the Baker is among the villagers that accompany Gaston and Le Fou to the Beast's castle to kill the Beast only for the villagers to be fended off by the transformed servants.

=== The Bookseller ===
The Bookseller
- First appearance: Beauty and the Beast (1991)
- Portrayed by: Ray Fearon (live-action film)
- Voiced by: Alvin Epstein

In-universe information
- Occupation: Bookseller

The Bookseller is the owner of a small bookstore/library in the village that Belle lived in. He is one of a few villagers that are friendly to Belle. When Belle visits his place of work, the Bookseller states that he hasn't received any new books yet. He does allow Belle to keep the book that she has borrowed twice.

In the live-action film, the Bookseller is replaced with Père Robert who is Villeneuve's local chaplain. He encourages Belle to borrow the books in the chapel's meager library. He later helps Belle pick up some laundry when the headmaster and Clothilde had some villagers throw them on the street after they discovered her trying to teach a young girl how to read. When Gaston has Monsieur D'Arque take Maurice to the Asylum after being accused for leaving him for dead, Père Robert insists that Maurice isn't insane and suggests that he be brought to a hospital. As Gaston leads the villagers to the Beast's castle with an intention to kill the Beast, Père Robert watched in horror as villagers furiously marched toward their destination while he defiantly remains behind and shuns himself from participating. After the spell that was cast by the Enchantress was broken, Père Robert was among those seen attending the ball.

=== The Enchantress ===
The Enchantress
- First appearance: Beauty and the Beast (1991)
- Portrayed by: Hattie Morahan (live-action film)
- Voiced by: Kath Soucie (second film)

The Enchantress is an off-screen, unnamed minor character, but she is responsible for the events in the story, as revealed in the prologue that it is she who curses Prince Adam as the Beast. She pays a visit to the castle one cold winter night and poses as an ugly, old peddler woman, offering a single rose for shelter. After being turned away by the prince twice, she reveals her true self (young and beautiful) and punishes him by transforming him into the Beast, his servants into objects, and his castle into a horrific version of itself laden with ugly gargoyles and grotesque statues. The Enchantress left the Beast with only two items, a magic mirror as the only window to the outside world, and the rose she had tried to give him. It turns out the rose is enchanted, working as an hourglass: it will bloom until his 21st birthday, when its petals will begin to fall. When the last petal falls, the prince will remain a Beast forever. The spell can only be broken if he can learn to love and receives love in return. Her spell is broken at the last second by Belle's confession of love for the Beast.

In The Enchanted Christmas, it is revealed that the Enchantress' visit that resulted in the curse occurred on Christmas Day, which resulted in Adam's dislike for the holiday. The Enchantress is voiced by Kath Soucie in the flashback scene of the film.

In the live-action version, the Enchantress is played by Hattie Morahan, who also serves as the narrator of the prologue. She came to a debutante ball disguised as a beggar woman (portrayed by Rita Davies) and offered a rose as payment for shelter from the storm. The Prince turned her away twice, prompting her to reveal her true self. She not only transformed the prince, his servants, and the castle, but erased the villagers' memory of the prince. Years later, she reappeared disguised as a hermit named Agathe. A deleted scene during the "Belle" song had Belle giving bread and jam to Agathe. She later tended to Maurice when Gaston left him for dead for the latter's refusal to hand Belle in marriage. Later, she came to the Beast's chamber while the Beast lay near death and overheard Belle profess her love for him despite it already being too late, as the last petal on the rose had fallen. She turned the rose into enchanted dust which revived the Beast and transformed both him and his servants into humans once again. Throughout the film, it is implied by her actions that she was never intended to curse the Beast and his servants forever, but to manipulate events to bring Belle and the Beast together.

=== Phillipe ===
Phillipe
- First appearance: Beauty and the Beast (1991)
- Portrayed by: Rusty (live-action film)
- Voiced by: Hal Smith (original film); Frank Welker (sequel)

In-universe information
- Species: Belgian Draught

Phillipe is a Belgian Draught owned by Belle and Maurice. He is frightened of wolves and he emits a loud toot noise.

=== Chef Bouche ===
Chef Bouche
- First appearance: Beauty and the Beast (1991)
- Portrayed by: Clive Rowe (live-action film)
- Voiced by: Brian Cummings (first film); Jim Cummings (third film); Clive Rowe (live-action film)

In-universe information
- Occupation: Chef de cuisine

Chef Bouche is the Beast's Chef de cuisine who was transformed into a stove. He was disappointed that Beast cancelled dinner and he felt he had to throw away what he had made until Belle finally informed him, Lumière, Cogsworth and Mrs. Potts that she was hungry. When the villagers attacked the castle, he and the knives ended up scaring away the villagers that chased Sultan into the kitchen.

In the Belle's Magical World segment "Mrs. Potts' Party," Chef Bouche is instructed by Belle to bake a cake for Mrs. Potts. Even though he ran into difficulty, Chef Bouche succeeded in making the cake as he and the kitchen staff help Belle present it to Mrs. Potts.

In the live-action film, Chef Bouche was renamed Cuisiner. In addition to being changed into a stove, he also consists of various pots, pans, and other kitchen utensils as facial features and body parts. Cuisiner is shown preparing a dinner for Belle on Lumiere's orders without the Beast finding out. A deleted scene has Cuisiner taking part in the battle against the villagers where he throws molasses and feathers all over the Triplets that chased Frou-Frou into the kitchen. In the same deleted scene where Le Fou had finished talking with Monsieur Toilette, Cuisiner is shown hugging Chapeau as Monsieur Toilette passes them. When Chapeau reacts to the hotness as a side effect of Cuisiner having been a stove, Cuisiner apologizes to Chapeau who gives him a forgiveness gesture.

=== Coat Rack ===
Coat Rack
- First appearance: Beauty and the Beast (1991)
- Portrayed by: Thomas Padden (live-action film)

In-universe information
- Occupation: Valet (live-action film)

The Coat Rack is an unnamed servant of the Beast who was turned into a coat rack that sports a green hat.

He was first seen amongst the castle's inhabitants welcoming Maurice and giving him a blanket to help him warm up. The Coat Rack was seen helping Beast get ready for his dance with Belle. When Gaston leads the villagers into raiding the castle, the Coat Rack is among the servants seen fighting the villagers where he boxes with one of the villagers.

In the live-action film, the Coat Rack has a larger role and is named Chapeau. He served as the Prince's silent aide (the junior novelization listed him as a valet) who was turned into a coat rack. When Maurice first enters the castle, he hands his coat on him. After Belle was frightened out of the West Wing by Beast, Chapeau tries to prevent Belle from leaving the castle. Chapeau later takes part in the fight against the villagers where he punches Le Fou. As the last petal falls, Chapeau catches Chip before being rendered inanimate like everyone else. After the spell is broken, Chapeau is restored to normal as he pulls his foot away from Frou-Frou who was urinating on it. A deleted scene involving Le Fou encountering Monsieur Toilette a second time has Chapeau hugging Cuisiner as he quotes "Hot Hot Hot" as a side effect of Cuisiner being a stove. Cuisiner apologizes and Chapeau gives him a forgiveness gesture.

=== Palanquin ===
Palanquin
- First appearance: Beauty and the Beast (1991)

Palanquin is an unidentified servant transformed into a palanquin that resides at the Beast's castle. His name comes from the comics.

After Belle agreed to take Maurice's place, Beast had Maurice loaded into Palanquin, while telling him that Belle is no longer his concern. Beast then orders Palanquin to drop Maurice back at the village. Palanquin did so after ripping its bindings off.

In The New Adventures of Disney's Beauty and the Beast comics, Mrs. Potts and Sultan enlist Palanquin to help rescue Beast and Chip when they fell off the castle into the ravine.

=== Wolves ===
Wolves
- First appearance: Beauty and the Beast (1991)
- Voiced by: Frank Welker

In-universe information
- Species: Eurasian wolves

A pack of wolves live in the forests near Beast's castle. They were first seen chasing after Maurice after he goes down its path and evades them when he goes through the gates of the castle. The wolf pack later encounters Belle and Phillippe when they flee Beast's chase and chase after them. When Phillipe gets his reigns caught on a branch and Belle tries to use a stick to fight them, Beast shows up and fights the wolves getting injured in the process. After Beast throws one of the wolves that might be their leader against a tree, the wolves flee.

One of the planned endings of the film would have the wolves make one more appearance where Gaston survives the fall from Beast's castle where he gets a broken leg and encounters the wolves. This was scrapped because of how gruesome it would be.

In Beauty and the Beast: The Enchanted Christmas, the wolf pack was seen again watching Belle and some of Beast's servants get a Christmas tree. They do not attack them and just acted like real-life wolves.

In the live-action film, the wolves roles remain intact. Unlike the animated films, they have the appearances of arctic wolves and their vocal effects were pulled off by mixing the sounds of leopards, lions, and tigers. One wolf has a scar over its right eye which implied that they have encountered the Beast before.

== Introduced in Beauty and the Beast: The Enchanted Christmas ==
=== Forte ===
Forte
- First appearance: Beauty and the Beast: The Enchanted Christmas (1997)
- Voiced by: Tim Curry
- Occupation: Court composer

Forte is the court composer of the castle and serves as the main antagonist of The Enchanted Christmas. During a Christmas party, Forte plays his latest song to the Prince which is criticized. When the Enchantress curses the Beast, he is transformed into a pipe organ that is contained in one of the rooms that is near the room where the Enchanted Rose is located. Unlike the other cursed servants, he enjoys his new form because of the power it grants him, as he feels that he's more useful to the Beast in this form than he was in his human form. As such, he intends to sabotage the Beast and Belle's relationship to ensure that the spell is never broken. He also uses Fife the Piccolo to carry out his plan, promising him his own musical solo when he succeeds (though he never actually intends to give the solo to him). He tries to lure Belle away from the castle to get a Christmas tree in an area beyond a frozen lake and get her killed. While she's away, Forte tells the Beast that Belle has abandoned him, thus increasing Beast's anger. He then proceeds to tell the Beast to destroy the Enchanted Rose, but the Beast ultimately decides not to when a rose petal lands on the storybook from Belle, thus allowing the Beast to regain his senses.

Enraged at this failure and refusing to "fade away", he decides to destroy the entire castle with his music, as the Beast and Belle can't fall in love if they are both dead. He ultimately meets his end when the Beast rips out his keyboard and wrecks it, causing Forte to try to kill the Beast by lunging at him. He ends up being dislodged from the wall causing Forte to crash to the ground.

=== Fife ===
Fife
- First appearance: Beauty and the Beast: The Enchanted Christmas (1997)
- Voiced by: Paul Reubens
- Occupation: Court composer

Fife is a resident of the castle. When the Enchantress curses the Beast, he is transformed into a piccolo. He is tricked by Forte into trying to sabotage the relationship under the promise of his own solo. Fife meets Belle after Forte lured her to his room to tell Belle where a suitable Christmas tree is located. However, shortly after she leaves, Forte tells Fife to follow her to the tree (presumably so he can cause the ice to break with his sound). Fife later regrets this action and decides to help Belle and Beast mend their relationship. Forte decides to destroy the castle and Fife tries to stop him. Forte reveals that he never intended to give him a musical solo (via expelling blank note sheets). No longer loyal to Forte, Fife tells the Beast that Forte's power comes from the keyboard and Beast uses this knowledge to depower him. In the ending of the film (taking place in the present), Fife seems to have taken over Forte's job as the court composer as he plays his piccolo.

=== Angelique ===
Angelique
- First appearance: Beauty and the Beast: The Enchanted Christmas (1997)
- Voiced by: Bernadette Peters
- Occupation: Castle decorator

Angelique is the castle decorator and Lumiere's old girlfriend. When the Enchantress curses the Beast, she transforms into a Christmas angel ornament. She initially opposes the idea of Christmas, but then reconsiders after Belle tells her the joys of Christmas. She later comforts Belle in the dungeon.

=== Axe ===
Axe
- First appearance: Beauty and the Beast: The Enchanted Christmas (1997)
- Voiced by: Jeff Bennett

The Axe is an unnamed servant who was transformed into an axe. He works in the boiler room, taking care of the wood that is thrown into the fire. He helps Belle when she searches for a Christmas tree, using him to cut it down. After Chip falls into the water and Belle works to rescue him, the Axe cuts open a hole in the ice.

== Introduced in Belle's Magical World ==
=== Webster ===
Webster
- First appearance: Belle's Magical World (1998)
- Voiced by: Jim Cummings
- Occupation: Scribe

Webster is the castle's scribe who was transformed into a dictionary by the Enchantress' spell. While he means well, he has a rather long tongue, often speaking out of the right moment. This leads to the other servants, particularly Lumiere and Cogsworth, to dislike him greatly. During the first segment of Belle's Magical World, he infuriates the Beast by giving unwanted synonyms to Belle's insults during a row leading the Beast to strike him. Wracked with guilt after Belle and the Beast stop speaking to each other, he forges a letter of apology from Belle with his two best friends Crane and LePlume. He is exiled from the castle when the Beast finds out, but amends are made after Belle brings him back.

=== Crane ===
Crane
- First appearance: Belle's Magical World (1998)
- Voiced by: Jeff Bennett

Crane is a set of paper sheets that is one of Webster's friends.

=== LePlume ===
LePlume
- First appearance: Belle's Magical World (1998)
- Voiced by: Rob Paulsen

LePlume is a quill that is one of Webster's friends.

=== Chandeleria ===
Chandeleria
- First appearance: Belle's Magical World (1998)
- Voiced by: April Winchell

Chandeleria is a chandelier that resides in the Beast's castle.

=== Concertina ===
Concertina
- First appearance: Belle's Magical World (1998)
- Voiced by: April Winchell
- Occupation: Accordion player

Concertina is an accordion player who was turned into an accordion as a side effect of the Enchantress' curse.

=== Egg Beater ===
Egg Beater
- First appearance: Belle's Magical World (1998)
- Voiced by: Rob Paulsen
- Occupation: Kitchen staff member

An unnamed egg beater resides in the Beast's castle and was transformed from an unnamed kitchen staff member.

=== Frappe ===
Frappe
- First appearance: Belle's Magical World (1998)
- Voiced by: Jeff Bennett

Frappe is a tea cart that resides in the Beast's castle.

=== Punch Bowl ===
Punch Bowl
- First appearance: Belle's Magical World (1998)
- Voiced by: Jim Cummings

An unnamed punch bowl resides in the Beast's castle. While noting that he is supposed to hold punch, he does get annoyed when Lumiere and Fifi plan to ride him which ended with him slipping off a balcony edge.

=== Trese and Chaud ===
Tres and Chaud
- First appearance: Belle's Magical World (1998)
- Voiced by: Tres: Rob Paulsen; Chaude: April Winchell
- Occupation: Kitchen staff members

Tres and Chaude are a husband and wife members of the kitchen staff who were transformed into oven mitts as a side effect of the Enchantress' curse. Tres is a right blue oven mitt and Chaud is a left red oven mitt. They did get on Chef Bouche's nerves when they argued over what cake Mrs. Potts liked.

=== Tubaloo ===
Tubaloo
- First appearance: Belle's Magical World (1998)
- Voiced by: Jim Cummings
- Occupation: Tuba player

Tubaloo is a tuba player that resides in the Beast's castle and was turned into a tuba as a side effect of the Enchantress' curse. He is often paired up with Concertina.

=== Witherspoon ===
Witherspoon
- First appearance: Belle's Magical World (1998)
- Voiced by: none

Witherspoon is the only one of Beast's servants who is not a household object. In contrast, he is an intelligent pigeon in charge of delivering the Beast's messages to the village for placing orders or anything similar.

== Introduced in the live-action film ==
=== Maestro Cadenza ===
Maestro Cadenza
- First appearance: Beauty and the Beast (2017)
- Portrayed by: Stanley Tucci (live-action film)
- Voiced by: Stanley Tucci

In-universe information
- Occupation: Court composer

Maestro Cadenza is the husband to the opera singer Madame de Garderobe and is the castle's court composer. At the time of his servitude to the Prince, Cadenza was suffering from dental problems. Cadenza is turned into a harpsichord by the Enchantress' spell on the castle while his wife is turned into a wardrobe. As a result, when he tries to play, he makes the occasional sour note due to the cavities in his teeth, but struggles through the pain in hopes of returning to his human form and reuniting with his wife.

When the villagers raid the castle, Cadenza takes part in the fight where he bodyslams LeFou and fires his remaining keys as a form of hailing bullets at the villagers but not long before Lumière scares the villagers off by lighting one of the gunpowder puddles on the castle floor causing it to spark and forcing the villagers to retreat in humiliation. When the spell is broken, Cadenza is finally reunited with Garderobe and gets his lost teeth replaced. He performs his music at the ball at the end of the film.

=== Jean Potts ===
Jean Potts
- First appearance: Beauty and the Beast (2017)
- Portrayed by: Gerard Horan

In-universe information
- Occupation: Potter

Jean Potts is an absent-minded potter who resides in the village of Villeneuve and is one of a few villagers that are friendly to Belle. He is depicted as Mrs. Potts' husband and Chip's father where he lost the memory of it when the Enchantress' spell is cast. Jean is first seen greeting Belle and comments the book she described as boring. His donkey was used for Belle's laundry invention. When the headmaster roused some villagers into destroying it, Jean walks his donkey away. Jean Potts is later seen in the tavern where Le Fou is trying to cheer up Gaston and when Maurice later came in accusing Gaston of leaving him for dead. Jean is among the villagers who assist Gaston in the attack on the Beast's castle. During the fight between the servants and the villagers, Mrs. Potts recognized her husband. When the spell is broken, Jean is reunited with his wife and son and later dances with his wife at the ball.

=== Clothilde ===
Clothilde
- First appearance: Beauty and the Beast (2017)
- Portrayed by: Haydn Gwynne

In-universe information
- Occupation: Fishmonger

Clothilde is a fishmonger who is married to Cogsworth. When the Enchantress casts her spell, she loses the memory of her husband.

During the opening song, Clothilde was shown selling some fish while trying to buy some eggs. Clothilde is among the villagers that assist the Headmaster into destroying her laundry machine and throwing Belle's laundry on the street after she and the Headmaster caught Belle trying to teach a young girl how to read.

She is among the villagers that join Gaston in the attack on Beast's castle. When the spell is broken, Clothilde is overjoyed to be reunited with her husband even though Cogsworth is quite horrified when Clothilde recognizes him. Later at the ball, she is seen dancing with a visibly annoyed Cogsworth.

=== Headmaster ===
Headmaster
- First appearance: Beauty and the Beast (2017)
- Portrayed by: Chris Andrew Mellon

In-universe information
- Occupation: Headmaster

The unnamed Headmaster runs an all-boys school in Villeneuve and has a strict personality. When he and Clothilde witness Belle teaching a girl helping the laundresses how to read, they decide something must be done about it. They roused some villagers into destroying Belle's invention and tossing her laundry onto the ground. As Pére Robert helps Belle pick up her laundry, Gaston shows up and breaks up the activity. While unaware on what the Headmaster and Clothilde started, he scolds the villagers present for behaving like this and to go home immediately. At one point, Gaston mentioned to Belle that the Headmaster never liked him at first.

=== Monsieur Toilette ===
Monsieur Toilette
- First appearance: Beauty and the Beast (2017; deleted scene)
- Portrayed by: Stephen Merchant

Monsieur Toilette is a servant of the Beast who was turned into a toilet. His scene was cut from the film, but is featured in the deleted scenes.

In the first deleted scene, Le Fou tries to take refuge in a room during the villagers' fight with the servants only to have a frightful encounter with Monsieur Toilette. In another deleted scene after the spell is broken, Le Fou encounters Monsieur Toilette in his human form who he identifies from the bathroom smell and was shown in a traumatized/relieved stated. When Le Fou asks him what he is going to do now, Monsieur Toilette states that he's going to go brush his teeth. He walks away pleased that he is human again as he passes by Cuisiner and Chapeau.
