= Gilles Caussade =

French film financier and producer

Gilles Caussade (born February 26, 1947, in France) is a French film financier and producer. His credits include the films "The City of Lost Children", "Arizona Dream", and "Amélie". Caussade worked with Emmanuel Benbihy to create "Paris, je t'aime" and served as executive producer for the film. He is now part of the Cities of Love global film project and along with Svetlana Novak is leading the production team for the Marseille, je t'aime edition of the film.

Caussade created the Herbier de Provence cosmetic brand and built it into an international franchise with more than 100 stores.

== Cities of Love ==
Cities of Love is a series of motion pictures illustrating the universality of love in major cities around the world. Each episode is a collective feature film comprising no fewer than 10 segments created by separate directors. Three such pictures have already been completed: Paris, je t'aime in 2006, New York, I Love You in 2009, and "Rio, Eu Te Amo" "Rio, I Love You" in 2014. Episodes are planned for Shanghai, Jerusalem, Venice, Delhi, Marseille, Berlin and New Orleans.
