= Paris, je t'aime =

2006 anthology film

- Theatrical release poster
- Directed by: see below
- Written by: Emmanuel Benbihy (transitions) see below
- Produced by: Claudie Ossard; Emmanuel Benbihy
- Starring: see below
- Cinematography: Various
- Edited by: Various
- Music by: Pierre Adenot
- Production companies: Victoires International; Pirol Film Production; Canal+
- Distributed by: La Fabrique de Films (France); Ascot Elite Entertainment Group (Switzerland); Senator Film (Germany)
- Release dates: 18 May 2006 (Cannes); 21 June 2006 (France); 13 September 2006 (Switzerland); 25 January 2007 (Germany)
- Running time: 120 minutes
- Countries: France; Germany; Switzerland; Liechtenstein
- Languages: French; English; Spanish; Mandarin; Arabic
- Budget: $13 million
- Box office: $17.5 million

Paris, je t'aime (French pronunciation: [paʁi ʒə tɛm]; lit. 'Paris, I Love You') is a 2006 anthology film starring an ensemble cast of actors of various nationalities. The two-hour film consists of eighteen short films set in different arrondissements (districts). The 22 directors include Gurinder Chadha, Sylvain Chomet, Joel and Ethan Coen, Isabel Coixet, Gérard Depardieu, Wes Craven, Alfonso Cuarón, Nobuhiro Suwa, Alexander Payne, Tom Tykwer, Walter Salles, Yolande Moreau and Gus Van Sant. It was the first film in the Cities of Love franchise.

== Production ==
Film director Julio Medem was attached to the project for a long time. He was supposed to direct one of the segments starring Javier Bardem and Maria Valverde, but this finally fell through because of scheduling conflicts with the filming of Caótica Ana (2007).

Paris, je t'aime is the first feature film to be fully scanned in 6K and mastered in 4K in Europe (as opposed to the normal 2K). Encoding the image took about 24 hours per reel (at Laboratoires Éclair).

Both Claudie Ossard and Emmanuel Benbihy served as producers on the project, while Gilles Caussade acted as an executive producer. As the film is a collection of shorter segments, there were also producers attached to each episode of the project.

== Arrondissements ==
Initially, 20 short films representing the 20 arrondissements of Paris were planned, but two of them (the 15th arrondissement, directed by Christoffer Boe, and the 11th arrondissement, by Raphaël Nadjari) were not included in the final film because they could not be properly integrated into it. Each arrondissement is followed by a few images of Paris; these transition sequences were written by Emmanuel Benbihy and directed by Benbihy with Frédéric Auburtin. Including Benbihy, there were 22 directors involved in the finished film.

Segment	Arrondissement	Director	Writer	Description	Actors
Montmartre	18th	Bruno Podalydès		A man parks his car on a Montmartre street and muses about how the women passing by his car all seem to be "taken". A woman passerby then faints near his car, and he comes to her aid.	Bruno Podalydès, Florence Muller
Quais de Seine	5th	Gurinder Chadha	Chadha and Paul Mayeda Berges	A young man, hanging out with two friends who catcall women who walk by, strikes up a friendship with a young Muslim woman.	Cyril Descours, Leïla Bekhti
Le Marais	4th	Gus Van Sant		A young male customer finds himself attracted to a young printshop worker and tries to explain that he believes the man to be his soulmate, not realising that he speaks little French.	Gaspard Ulliel, Elias McConnell, Marianne Faithfull
Tuileries	1st	Joel and Ethan Coen		A comedy in which an American tourist waiting at the Tuileries station becomes involved in the conflict between a young couple after he breaks the cardinal rule of avoiding eye contact with people on the Paris Métro.	Steve Buscemi, Axel Kiener, Julie Bataille
Loin du 16e	16th	Walter Salles and Daniela Thomas		A young immigrant woman sings a Spanish lullaby ("Que Linda Manita") to her baby before leaving it in a daycare. She then takes an extremely long commute to the home of her wealthy employer (whose face is not seen), where she sings the same lullaby to her employer's baby.	Catalina Sandino Moreno
Porte de Choisy	13th	Christopher Doyle	Doyle, Gabrielle Keng Peralta and Rain Kathy Li	A comedy in which a sales representative for a line of hair products makes a call on a Chinatown salon run by a woman who proves to be a tough customer.	Barbet Schroeder, Li Xin
Bastille	12th	Isabel Coixet		Prepared to leave his marriage for a much younger lover, a man named Sergio instead decides to stay with his wife after she reveals a terminal illness—and he rediscovers the love he once felt for her.	Sergio Castellitto, Miranda Richardson, Javier Cámara, Leonor Watling
Place des Victoires	2nd	Nobuhiro Suwa		A mother, grieving over the death of her little son, is comforted by a magical cowboy.	Juliette Binoche, Willem Dafoe, Martin Combes
Tour Eiffel	7th	Sylvain Chomet		A boy recounts how his parents, both mime artists, meet in prison and fall in love.	Paul Putner, Yolande Moreau
Parc Monceau	17th	Alfonso Cuarón		An older man and younger woman meet for an arrangement that a third person (Gaspard), who is close to the woman, may not be happy about. It is eventually revealed that the young woman is his daughter, and Gaspard is her baby. The segment was shot in a single continuous shot, almost five minutes long. When the characters walk by a video store, several posters of films by the other directors of Paris, je t'aime are visible in the window.	Nick Nolte, Ludivine Sagnier
Quartier des Enfants Rouges	3rd	Olivier Assayas		An American actress procures some exceptionally strong hashish from a dealer whom she develops a crush on.	Maggie Gyllenhaal, Lionel Dray
Place des fêtes	19th	Oliver Schmitz		A Nigerian man dying from a stab wound in the Place des fêtes asks a female paramedic for a cup of coffee. It is then revealed that he had fallen in love at first sight with her some time previously. By the time she remembers him, and has received the coffee, he has been taken away in an ambulance.	Seydou Boro, Aïssa Maïga
Pigalle	9th	Richard LaGravenese		An aging couple act out a fantasy argument in front of a stripper in order to keep the spark in their relationship.	Bob Hoskins, Fanny Ardant
Quartier de la Madeleine	8th	Vincenzo Natali		In this dialogueless segment, a young backpacker travelling late at night stumbles across a vampire feeding on a dead man. Though initially frightened, he soon falls in love with her, and cuts his wrist to attract her with his blood. The wound causes the backpacker to fall down a flight of stairs and strike his head against the pavement in a potentially fatal injury, but the vampire reappears and feeds him some of her own blood, turning him into a vampire and allowing the two to begin a relationship.	Elijah Wood, Olga Kurylenko
Père-Lachaise	20th	Wes Craven		While visiting Père Lachaise Cemetery, a young woman breaks up with her fiancé, who then redeems himself with the aid of advice from the ghost of Oscar Wilde.	Emily Mortimer, Rufus Sewell, Alexander Payne
Faubourg Saint-Denis (True)	10th	Tom Tykwer		After mistakenly believing that his girlfriend, a struggling American actress, has broken up with him, a young blind man reflects on the growth and seeming decline of their relationship.	Melchior Beslon, Natalie Portman
Quartier Latin	6th	Frédéric Auburtin and Gérard Depardieu	Gena Rowlands	A separated couple meet at a bistro for one last drink before they officially divorce.	Gena Rowlands, Ben Gazzara, Gérard Depardieu
14e arrondissement	14th	Alexander Payne	Payne and Nadine Eïd	Carol, a letter carrier from Denver on her first European holiday, recites in amateur French what she loves about Paris.	Margo Martindale

== Release ==
The film premiered at the 2006 Cannes Film Festival on 18 May, opening the Un Certain Regard selection. It had its Canadian premiere at the 2006 Toronto International Film Festival on 10 September and its US premiere in Pittsburgh, Pennsylvania, on 9 April 2007. Paris, je t'aime was released theatrically in France on 21 June 2006 by La Fabrique de Films, in Switzerland on 13 September 2006 by Ascot Elite Entertainment Group and in Germany on 25 January 2007 by Senator Film. First Look Pictures acquired the North American rights in September 2006, and the film opened in New York City on 4 May 2007, before expanding to other American cities including Los Angeles on 18 May.

== Reception ==
Paris, je t'aime received generally positive reviews. On the review aggregator website Rotten Tomatoes, the film holds an approval rating of 86% based on 112 reviews, with an average rating of 7.1/10. The website's critics consensus reads, "Paris Je T'aime is uneven, but there are more than enough delightful moments in this omnibus tribute to the City of Light to tip the scale in its favor." Metacritic, which uses a weighted average, assigned the film a score of 66 out of 100, based on 27 critics, indicating "generally favorable" reviews.

== Influence ==
Following the success of Paris, je t'aime, a similarly structured film, New York, I Love You, focusing on life in that city, premiered at the 2008 Toronto International Film Festival and received a limited theatrical release in 2009. The third and fourth entries in the series, Tbilisi, I Love You and Rio, I Love You, were released in 2014. Berlin, I Love You followed in 2019.

The film was the first part of the film almanac series "...I love you". The action of each takes place in one of the cities of the globe:

- New York, I Love You (2009) — New York, United States
- Moscow, I love you! (2010) — Moscow, Russia
- Revolution, I love you (2010) — Mexico; takes place after the Mexican Revolution in 1910
- Shanghai, I Love You (2011) — Shanghai, China
- Lovers in Kyiv (2011) — Kyiv, Ukraine
- Bishkek, I Love You (2011) — Bishkek, Kyrgyzstan
- Sapsan, I Love You (2012) — Sapsan train between Moscow and Saint Petersburg, Russia
- 7 Days in Havana (2012) — Havana, Cuba
- My heart is Astana (2012) — Astana, Kazakhstan
- Rio, I Love You (2013) — Rio de Janeiro, Brazil
- Made in Cleveland (2013) — Cleveland, United States
- Jerusalem, I Love You (2014) — Jerusalem, Israel
- Tbilisi, I Love You (2014) — Tbilisi, Georgia
- Baku, I Love You (2015) — Baku, Azerbaijan
- St. Petersburg. Only for Love (2016) — Saint Petersburg, Russia
- Ulan-Ude, I Love You (2018) — Ulan-Ude, Russia
- Berlin, I Love You (2019) — Berlin, Germany
- Almaty, I Love You! (2023) — Almaty, Kazakhstan
