= A Green Story =

- Directed by: Nika Agiashvili
- Written by: Nika Agiashvili
- Produced by: Nika Agiashvili
- Starring: Ed O'Ross; Billy Zane; Malcolm McDowell; Shannon Elizabeth; Annabella Sciorra; George Finn
- Distributed by: Indican Pictures
- Release date: May 31, 2012 (Los Angeles Greek Film Festival)
- Countries: United States; Greece
- Languages: English; Greek

A Green Story is a 2012 biographical drama film written and directed by Nika Agiashvili.

== Plot ==
An American businessman, diagnosed with cancer and given a few months to live, reflects on his early life as a Greek immigrant in the 1950s. Determined to secure his legacy, he decides to close one final business deal that will immortalize his company's success.
