= Daughter of the Wolf =

2019 Canadian action film

- Theatrical release poster
- Directed by: David Hackl
- Written by: Nika Agiashvili
- Produced by: Benjamin DeWalt; Kevin DeWalt; Douglas Falconer; Danielle Masters
- Starring: Gina Carano; Richard Dreyfuss; Brendan Fehr
- Cinematography: Mark Dobrescu
- Edited by: Jackie Dzuba
- Music by: Jeff Toyne
- Production companies: Minds Eye Entertainment; Falconer Pictures; VMI Worldwide
- Distributed by: QME Entertainment; Minds Eye International; Vertical Entertainment
- Release dates: June 14, 2019 (United States); August 2, 2019 (Canada)
- Running time: 88 minutes
- Country: Canada
- Language: English

Daughter of the Wolf is a 2019 Canadian action film directed by David Hackl and written by Nika Agiashvili. The film stars Gina Carano and Richard Dreyfuss.

== Plot ==
Clair Hamilton is a military veteran whose son Charlie has been kidnapped. She brings a bag of money as ransom for Charlie but at the exchange she is double-crossed by the kidnappers, leading to a shootout. Clair shoots two of the kidnappers but one of the men, Larsen, escapes. Clair falls into a frozen lake while chasing him but Larsen pulls her out because he was not planning to kill anyone and did not know about the plans to double-cross her. Clair has a peaceful encounter with a black wolf while recovering, then catches up with Larsen and forces him at gunpoint to take her to where her son is being held.The leader of the kidnappers, Father, is angry at Clair's father for closing a mill and leaving with the money owed to him. As they near the hideout in the snowy forest they are fired upon, but the rifleman is attacked and killed by three wolves.

They reach the hideout, but the kidnappers have moved on to a lodge on the other side of the mountain to await a hand-off to sell off the boy. Larsen reveals that Father killed his father and abducted Larsen and his mother when he was a boy. At the lodge Clair attempts to exchange the money and Larsen for Charlie. Father pulls out a concealed gun and shoots at Charlie but Larsen jumps in front of the bullet and is shot in the back. Clair shoots Father and the other kidnappers, then flees on a snowmobile pursued by the uninjured kidnapper Hobbs whose metal knife stopped the bullet Clair shot at her. Clair crashes her snowmobile and gets into a knife fight with Hobbs but is pushed over the edge of a waterfall and Charlie is captured again.

Clair climbs out of the river and is guided into the forest by three wolves. She returns to the lodge, kills the injured kidnapper with a hatchet, and confronts Father, who is inside torturing Larsen with a red hot fireplace poker while confessing that he killed Larsen's mother after she left him. Charlie returns with Hobbs and Clair throws a knife into her throat. Larsen attacks Father but Father shoots him then turns the gun on Charlie as Clair leaps at Father and pushes him out a window. Clair thanks Larsen before he dies, then she climbs on a snowmobile and exchanges glances with the black wolf as it approaches before she escapes with Charlie. Father rises out of the snow as a pack of wolves descends on him and tears him apart. Three months later, in the spring, Clair and Charlie are hiking a path on the mountain when she sees the black wolf again and smiles.

== Cast ==
- Gina Carano as Clair Hamilton
- Richard Dreyfuss as Father
- Brendan Fehr as Larsen
- Sydelle Noel as Hobbs
- Anton Gillis-Adelman as Charlie Hamilton
- Chad Riley as Nolan
- Brock Morgan as Virgil
- Stew McLean as Seth
- Joshua Murdoch as Phillip

== Production ==
Filming took place from March 18 to April 13, 2019 at 4205 Gellatly Road, West Kelowna, British Columbia, Canada. There is also a scene near the end featuring Helmcken Falls which is north of Clearwater, BC, in Wells Grey Provincial Park.

== Release ==
The film was released in the United States on June 14, 2019 and in Canada on August 2, 2019. It was later screened in the Center Stage Competition at Taormina Film Fest in Sicily on June 30, 2019.

== Response ==
=== Critical reception ===
On review aggregator Rotten Tomatoes, the film holds an approval rating of 22%, based on nine reviews, with an average rating of 4/10. On Metacritic, the film has a weighted average score of 36 out of 100, based on 6 critics, indicating "generally unfavorable reviews".

Frank Scheck of The Hollywood Reporter called the film "a subpar vehicle for an action star who deserves better" and wondered if Richard Dreyfuss "ever imagined he would be reduced to this sort of B-level material when winning an Academy Award for The Goodbye Girl and working for directors like George Lucas, Steven Spielberg, Paul Mazursky and Barry Levinson."

Courtney Howard of Variety.com called it a "female-led, capably-crafted actioner", writing that "the filmmakers adeptly blur the lines between the heroes and anti-heroes, constructing a dynamic, character-driven portrait of rage and redemption." She concluded, "In an era of the 'Strong Female Character,' Hackl and Agiashvili’s iteration blessedly doesn’t rely on lazy screenwriting shorthand, nor does it pander to feminism with a simple gender-swap in its female-centered feature. These filmmakers are eager to explore the delicate facets of a forceful, fully-formed woman, and they do so with imagery that’s both stunning and subtle."

Bilge Ebiri of The New York Times found that "the lack of depth or dimension becomes fatal" and concluded that "this kidnapping thriller will leave you cold in more ways than one."

The film received three Canadian Screen Award nominations at the 8th Canadian Screen Awards in 2020, for Best TV Movie, Best Supporting Actor in a Television Drama Series or Program (Fehr) and Best Direction in a Television Drama Series or Program (Hackl).

It later became very popular on Amazon Prime in December 2021 due to renewed interest in Carano reaching number 3 on the charts for the Christmas period. It also enjoyed continued popularity on Freeview shooting up to number 7 on the charts in 2025.
