= Tbilisi, I Love You =

- Theatrical release poster
- Directed by: Nika Agiashvili; Irakli Chkhikvadze; Levan Glonti; Alexander Kviria; Tako Shavgulidze; Kote Takaishvili; Levan Tutberidze.
- Written by: Nika Agiashvili; Emmanuel Benbihy; Tristan Carné; Levan Glonti; Sandro Kakulia; Archil Kikodze; Alexander Kviria; Tako Shavgulidze; Kote Takaishvili; Levan Tutberidze
- Produced by: David Agiashvili; Nika Agiashvili; Emmanuel Benbihy; Jason Speer
- Edited by: Irakli Chkhikvadze; Levan Kukhashvili; Nodar Nozadze; Rusudan Pirveli
- Music by: Niaz Diasamidze
- Production company: Storyman Pictures
- Release dates: 12 February 2014 (Tbilisi premiere); 20 February 2014 (United States)
- Running time: 93 minutes
- Country: Georgia
- Languages: Georgian, English

Tbilisi, I Love You (Georgian: თბილისი, მიყვარხარ Tbilisi, miq'varkhar) is a 2014 anthology film produced by Nika Agiashvili and David Agiashvili, starring an ensemble cast of actors of various nationalities and part of Emmanuel Benbihy's Cities of Love franchise that started with Paris, je t'aime and New York, I Love You.

The film's Tbilisi premiere took place on February 12, 2014, the same day producer David Agiashvili died in Los Angeles; the screening was dedicated to his memory. The film went on to a wider release on February 20, 2014.

The film consists of a series of 10 short films written and directed by natives of Georgia, and take on a personal narrative about the republic's capital city. Malcolm McDowell and Ron Perlman both feature. McDowell's vignette centers on an actor who reluctantly agrees to a one-month shoot in Tbilisi and develops a love affair with the city. Perlman's short features him as a nameless American motorcyclist who rides through Tbilisi's remote areas with a woman named Freedom.

== Cast ==
- Malcolm McDowell as Mr. M
- Ron Perlman as nameless rider
- George Finn as Sandro
- Sarah Dumont as Freedom
- Nutsa Kukhianidze as Nana
- Ia Sukhitashvili as actress
- Tinatin Dalakishvili as actress
