= George Finn =

Georgian-American actor

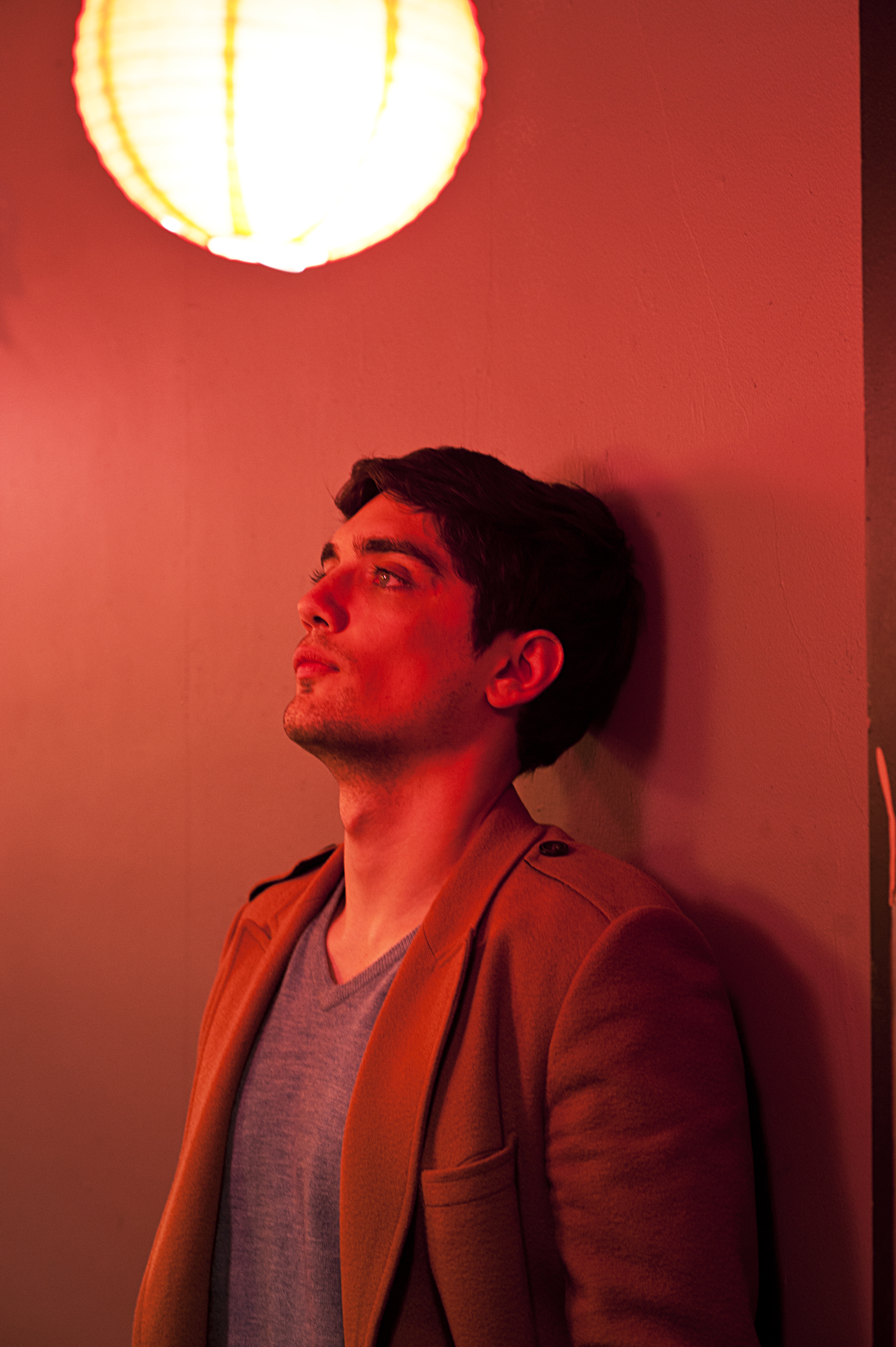
- Finn in 2014
- Born: George Agiashvili; January 21, 1990 (age 36); Tbilisi, Georgia
- Occupations: Actor; Producer
- Years active: 2004–present

George Finn (Georgian: გიორგი აგიაშვილი; born January 21, 1990) is a Georgian-American actor and producer. He is best known for his roles in the films LOL, Time Lapse (2014) and Tbilisi, I Love You (2014) and the 2026 action thriller Atlas King.

== Early life ==
Finn was born George Agiashvili in Tbilisi, Georgia, and later moved to Los Angeles, California.

== Career ==
Finn first appeared in a recurring role, as Julian, on Unfabulous from 2004 until 2007. He has subsequently had many guest starring roles since then, appearing on Lincoln Heights (2009), 90210 (2009), How I Met Your Mother (2009–10), Cold Case (2010), and The Mentalist (2014). Finn has had lead roles in several films directed by his brother, Nika Agiashvili, including The Harsh Life of Veronica Lambert (2009), A Green Story (2012) and Tbilisi, I Love You (2014).

He starred as Chad in LOL (2012) alongside Demi Moore and Miley Cyrus, and was one of the lead roles, portraying Jasper, in Time Lapse (2014) alongside Danielle Panabaker and Matt O'Leary. He starred as Matt in the horror film Feral (2017). Finn also starred as the lead in Agiashvili's film The Short Happy Life of Butch Livingston, shot in Los Angeles and produced by Agiashvili's Storyman Pictures alongside John Edward Lee and Deanna Plascencia. In 2021 George starred opposite Rainey Qualley in a short film Delilah.

In 2026, Finn starred as Tommy in Atlas King, an action thriller written and directed by Nika Agiashvili, and served as one of the film's producers. The film was produced under Punch It Films, a production company Finn co-founded with Agiashvili, Michael Bisping, and John Edward Lee.

== Filmography ==
=== Film ===
Year	Title	Role	Notes
2009	The Harsh Life of Veronica Lambert	Luke	
2012	A Green Story	Younger Van	
2012	LOL	Chad	
2013	Love's Routine	Ben	Short film
2014	Just Before I Go	Wyatt	
2014	Time Lapse	Jasper	
2014	Tbilisi, I Love You	Sandro	
2017	Feral	Matt	
2018	The Short Happy Life of Butch Livingston	Butch Livingston	Pre-production
2021	Delilah	Gecko	Short film
2026	Atlas King	Tommy	Also producer

=== Television ===
Year	Title	Role	Notes
2004–07	Unfabulous	Julian	3 episodes
2009	Paparazzi	Forensic 1	Television short
2009	Lincoln Heights	Derek	Episode: "Home Again"
2009	90210	Michael	3 episodes
2009–10	How I Met Your Mother	Jamie Ademic	2 episodes
2010	Cold Case	Barry Jensen	2 episodes
2014	The Mentalist	Wes Baxter	Episode: "Blue Bird"

=== Web ===
Year	Title	Role	Notes
2009	Sex Ed	Billy Henry	Unknown episodes
2009	Rockville CA	Adam	Episode: "Shoegazed"
