= New York, I Love You =

2009 anthology film directed by Fatih Akın and 10 others

- Theatrical release poster
- Directed by: Fatih Akin; Yvan Attal; Randall Balsmeyer; Allen Hughes; Shunji Iwai; Jiang Wen; Shekhar Kapur; Joshua Marston; Mira Nair; Natalie Portman; Brett Ratner
- Written by: See below
- Produced by: Emmanuel Benbihy; Marina Grasic
- Starring: See below
- Cinematography: Jean-Louis Bompoint; Benoît Debie; Paweł Edelman; Mark Lee Ping Bin; Michael McDonough; Andrij Parekh; Declan Quinn; Mauricio Rubinstein
- Edited by: Jennifer Augé; Tricia Cooke; Jacob Craycroft; Affonso Gonçalves; Mark Helfrich; Shunji Iwai; Allyson C. Johnson; Melody London; Cindy Mollo; Craig McKay
- Music by: Tonino Baliardo; Nicholas Britell; Paul Cantelon; Mychael Danna; Ilhan Ersahin; Jack Livesey; Shoji Mitsui; Mark Mothersbaugh; Peter Nashel; Atticus Ross; Leopold Ross; Claudia Sarne; Marcelo Zarvos
- Production companies: Grosvenor Park Media; Palm Pictures; Plum Pictures
- Distributed by: Vivendi Entertainment
- Release dates: September 2008 (TIFF); October 16, 2009 (United States)
- Running time: 103 minutes
- Country: United States
- Language: English
- Box office: $9.7 million

New York, I Love You is a 2008 American romantic comedy-drama anthology film consisting of eleven short films, each by a different director. The shorts all relate in some way to the subject of love and are set among the five boroughs of New York City. The film is a sequel of sorts to the 2006 film Paris, je t'aime, which had the same structure, and is the second installment in the Cities of Love franchise, created and produced by Emmanuel Benbihy.

The film stars an ensemble cast, among them Bradley Cooper, Shia LaBeouf, Natalie Portman, Anton Yelchin, Hayden Christensen, Orlando Bloom, Irrfan Khan, Rachel Bilson, Chris Cooper, Andy García, Christina Ricci, John Hurt, Cloris Leachman, Robin Wright, Julie Christie, Maggie Q, Ethan Hawke, James Caan, Shu Qi, and Eli Wallach.

New York, I Love You premiered at the 2008 Toronto International Film Festival in September 2008, and was released in the United States on October 16, 2009. The film grossed $9.7 million at the box office, and received mixed reviews.

== Segments ==
The shorts of New York, I Love You have a unifying thread, of a videographer who films the other characters, which differentiates it from the film Paris, je t'aime.

While the TIFF premiere of the film featured 14 shorts, distributors later decided to cut two of them: Scarlett Johansson's directorial debut These Vagabond Shoes and Andrei Zvyagintsev's Apocrypha. The decision was taken after a focus group was held in New York, where these two shorts met with disfavor.

Segment	Director	Writer	Description	Actors
1	Jiang Wen	Hu Hong & Meng Yao; Adaptation: Israel Horovitz	Ben, a pickpocket, steals Garry's wallet and follows a stranger, Molly, to a bar in Tribeca, charming her into buying him a drink. Garry arrives and is revealed to be having an affair with Molly, and toys with the thief in a game of one-upmanship. Ben departs but is stopped by Molly.	Hayden Christensen as Ben; Andy García as Garry; Rachel Bilson as Molly
2	Mira Nair	Suketu Mehta	In the Diamond District, Mansuhkhbai, a Jain diamond merchant, completes a friendly deal with Rifka, a Hasidic broker. Mansuhkhbai's wife has returned to India to live as a nun, and Rifka removes her wig to reveal her newly shaven head, in preparation for her wedding. They share a tender embrace, and each later imagines being married to the other.	Natalie Portman as Rifka; Irrfan Khan as Mansuhkhbai
3	Shunji Iwai	Adaptation: Israel Horovitz	David, an anime composer working out of his apartment, is tasked by a director to read the works of Fyodor Dostoevsky for inspiration. He bonds with Camille, the director's assistant, over their regular phone conversations, but is daunted by the sheer amount of reading. Camille offers to help, much like Dostoevsky's stenographer-turned-wife Anna, and she and David finally meet face to face.	Orlando Bloom as David; Christina Ricci as Camille
4	Yvan Attal	Olivier	In SoHo, a writer flirts with a stranger after lighting her cigarette, but is speechless when she reveals she is a call girl, leaving him her business card. A similar encounter unfolds between Anna, who feels unnoticed by her husband, and Alex, a businessman she tempts with the idea of sex with a stranger. Anna's husband is revealed to be Alex himself, and they reignite their relationship.	Maggie Q as Call Girl; Ethan Hawke as Writer; Chris Cooper as Alex; Robin Wright Penn as Anna
5	Brett Ratner	Jeff Nathanson	At a drugstore on the Upper West Side, a teenage boy reluctantly agrees to take the owner's daughter, who uses a wheelchair, to his prom at Tavern on the Green. They return home through Central Park, where she uses his belt to suspend herself from a tree to have sex. In the morning, he discovers she is a method actress and the wheelchair is merely research for a role. He returns to the tree, where many other belts have been left before.	Anton Yelchin as Boy; James Caan as Mr. Riccoli; Olivia Thirlby as Actress; Blake Lively as Ex-Girlfriend
6	Allen Hughes	Xan Cassavetes & Stephen Winter	After a one-night stand, Gus and Lydia have second thoughts about meeting again for a drink in Greenwich Village. Gus nearly leaves just as Lydia arrives, and they wordlessly share a taxi for another passionate night together.	Bradley Cooper as Gus; Drea de Matteo as Lydia
7	Shekhar Kapur	Anthony Minghella	At a Fifth Avenue hotel, Isabelle, a once-famous opera singer, is assisted by Jacob, a young bellhop. He finds violets for her room, and they share conversation and a gift of champagne from his father, the hotel manager. Offering to close the window, Jacob appears to fall to his death, but Isabelle is revealed to have been speaking with another bellhop instead. Sharing the same conversation, the older bellhop closes the window.	Julie Christie as Isabelle; John Hurt as Bellhop; Shia LaBeouf as Jacob
8	Natalie Portman	Natalie Portman	Dante is a ballet dancer and loving father to his young daughter, Teya. He brings her to the Bethesda Terrace and Fountain, where other parents assume he is her nanny, before returning her to his ex-wife, whom he urges to spend more time with their daughter. Later, Teya cheers on her father at a performance.	Taylor Geare as Teya; Carlos Acosta as Dante; Jacinda Barrett as Maggie
9	Fatih Akın	Fatih Akın	An artist who never paints eyes is inspired by a herbalist he meets in Chinatown, but she declines to let him paint her. Changing her mind, she arrives at his apartment to learn he has died, and takes a sketch he made of her, cutting her own eyes out of a photograph to complete the portrait.	Uğur Yücel as Painter; Shu Qi as Chinese Herbalist; Burt Young as Landlord
10	Joshua Marston	Joshua Marston	On their 63rd anniversary, Abe and Mitzie bicker, reminisce, and lean on each other as they make their annual journey to the Coney Island boardwalk.	Eli Wallach as Abe; Cloris Leachman as Mitzie
Transitions	Randy Balsmeyer	Hall Powell, Israel Horovitz & James Strouse	Zoe, a videographer who records people around her, captures the various strangers and lovers who cross paths throughout the film.	Emilie Ohana as Zoe, the Video Artist; Eva Amurri as Sarah; Justin Bartha as Justin

== Release ==
The film grossed $1,588,087 in the United States, and $8,136,973 in other territories, for a worldwide total of $9,725,060.

== Reception ==
On Rotten Tomatoes, the film holds a 37% approval rating based on 100 reviews, with an average rating of 5.10/10. The site's critics' consensus reads: "Like many anthologies, New York, I Love You has problems of consistency, but it isn't without its moments". On Metacritic it holds a score of 49 out of 100, based on reviews from 26 critics, indicating "mixed or average reviews".

Lisa Schwarzbaum of Entertainment Weekly gave the film a B regarding the film "takes the wrinkle-free, easy-travel concept first executed in the 2007 Gallic compilation Paris, je t'aime to a new city and styles itself..." Roger Ebert of the Chicago Sun-Times gave the film 3 stars saying in his review, "By its nature, "New York, I Love You" can't add up. It remains the sum of its parts." A. O. Scott of The New York Times gave the film a mixed review claiming "Not that the 11 shorts in New York, I Love You are all that bad. It's a nice-looking city, after all, even if the interstitial skyline and traffic montages assembled by Randy Balsmeyer are about as fresh as the postcards on sale in Times Square."

Erica Abeel of The Hollywood Reporter writes:

New York, I Love You continues the Cities of Love series that began with Paris, je t'aime far surpassing it... The vignettes are tied together into a single feature through a recurrent character, a videographer who interacts with the other characters. And transitional elements—choreographed by 11th director Randy Balsmeyer—move the viewer from one world to another, uniting all these intimate stories into a single shimmering fabric.

Heidi Patalano of Metro New York gives the film a 4 grade out of 5.

With younger, less-tested directing talent, the film plays down the delineation between one director's work and another, opting to blend them through loosely interconnected characters here and there. As opposed to its directing roster, however, the cast boasts quite a few big names, all of which lend a surprising amount of authenticity to these funny, imaginative little stories.

Claudia Puig of USA Today explains that anthologies are by their very nature an uneven entity and adds:

The multicultural emphasis—both in characters and in the unusual selection and collaboration of filmmakers and artists—is one of New York, I Love You's main assets. And there's no question that Manhattan looks ever-vibrant and beautiful.

== In popular culture ==
An episode of the Netflix series Master of None is named and structured after New York, I Love You. Like the film, the episode follows the intersecting lives of various New Yorkers, although the stories are not exclusively about romance.
