= Zelda Tinska =

Serbian actress

- Born: Milica Zelda Tinska; 21 February 1979 (age 47); Belgrade, SR Serbia, SFR Yugoslavia (now Serbia)
- Occupation: Actress
- Years active: 1999–present
- Parent(s): Jelena Tinska; Dragoslav Lutovac

Milica Zelda Tinska (Serbian Cyrillic: Милица Зелда Тинска; born 1979) is a Serbian actress.

== Career ==
Zelda trained as a ballerina in the renowned École supérieure de danse de Cannes Rosella Hightower, France, and later at the London Studio Centre, a college for performing arts in London, UK.

She was a professional jazz, ballet and neoclassical dancer prior to becoming an actress, after being cast as Sonja in The Beach opposite Leonardo DiCaprio. As an actress, she appeared in the Waking The Dead, The Bill, The Beach, The Mother, Mathilde and many other productions, and has performed in English, French, Serbian, Croatian, Bosnian, Russian and Albanian.

Tinska was part of the visual effects team of the film Ex Machina who received an Oscar for Best Achievement in Visual Effects. When not acting, Zelda works as a VFX Producer. She is a full voting member of BAFTA.

== Early life ==
Tinska is the daughter of Jelena Tinska, a renowned Serbian actress, talk show host, and writer, and Dragoslav Lutovac, a film and television director. Her maternal grandfather Aleksandar Petrovic was a distinguished writer and acclaimed Shakespearean translator. In addition to translating nearly the entire works of William Shakespeare he also translated books by authors such as Salman Rushdi, John Updike and Hubert Selby among many others. Petrovic was also a prolific author, with works like ("Sladak zivot na srpski nacin") . Zelda's maternal great-grandfather, Woislav M. Petrovitch was the late Attaché to the Serbian Royal Legation to the Court of St. James. Zelda's sister, Ljubica Jentl Tinska, is a successful translator and artist.

Tinska lives and works in London, England.

== Filmography ==
Title	Year	Role	Notes
The Bill	1999	Mia	(TV series) Episode "Under Duress"
The Beach	2000	Sonja	
Holby City	2000	Talia Dachovia	(TV series) Episode "Dispossessed"
Balti Kings Video	2001	Mariam	(Short film)
Auf Wiedersehen, Pet	2002	Irina	(TV series) 3 episodes
Hard Labour	2003	Elena	(Short film)
The Break In	2003	Joe	(Short film)
The Mother	2003	Barmaid	Uncredited
Midnight Feast	2003	Mariam	(Short film)
First Time Magic	2004	Joe	(Short film)
Mathilde	2004	Dr Simić	
Beneath the Skin	2005	Lena	(TV film)
The Bill	2005	Rumali	(TV series) Episode "342"
EastEnders	2007	Hostess	(TV series) 1 episode
Taximan	2008	Voice	(Short film)
Waking the Dead	2009	Olena Kuzmich	(TV series) 2 episodes
Capture Anthologies: Love, Lust and Tragedy	2010	Yelena	
Coronation Street	2010	Anka / Cleaner	(TV series) 3 episodes
Sirens	2011	Ana	(TV series) 2 episodes
