= A Trip to Karabakh =

A trip to Karabakh
- Directed by: Levan Tutberidze
- Written by: Aka Morchiladze; Irakli Solomonashvili, based on the Journey to Karabakh
- Produced by: Levan Korinteli; George Kharabadze
- Starring: Levan Doborjginidze; Mikheil Meskhi; Dato Iashvili; Nutsa Kukhianidze
- Cinematography: Goran Pavicevic
- Edited by: Boris Machytka; Niko Tarielashvili
- Music by: Nukri Abashidze
- Distributed by: Film Studio Remka
- Release date: 2005
- Running time: 105 minutes
- Country: Georgia
- Language: Georgian

A Trip to Karabakh (Gaseirneba Karabaghshi in Georgian) is a 2005 Georgian film directed by Levan Tutberidze and based on the 1992 novel Journey to Karabakh by Aka Morchiladze.

== Plot ==
A group of teenage boys from Tbilisi take a trip to Azerbaijan to buy drugs, and end up fighting in the first Nagorno-Karabakh War, when they are captured by Azerbaijani militants, with one subsequently being captured by the Armenians. During the course of events, the main character has flashbacks to his relationship with his father, as well as a depressive prostitute.

== Cast ==
- Levan Doborjginidze - Gio
- Mikheil Meskhi - Gogliko
- Dato Iashvili
- Nutsa Kukhianidze - Jana
- Gia Gachechiladze - Utsnobi
- Gogi Kharabadze - Tengizi
- Nino Kasradze - Nana
- Robert Sturua
- Dasha Drozdovskaja - Journalist
- Giorgi Gurgulia
- Sandro Kakulia
- Sandro Qutidze - Irakli

== Awards ==
- Grand Prize, Kinoshok - Open CIS and Baltic Film Festival
- FIPRESCI Prize, Tbilisi International Film Festival
