= Journey to Karabakh =

1992 novel by Aka Morchiladze

- Author: Aka Morchiladze
- Original title: მოგზაურობა ყარაბახში
- Translator: Elizabeth Heighway
- Language: Georgian
- Series: Georgian Literature Series
- Genre: Adventure fiction Novel
- Publisher: Dalkey Archive Press
- Publication date: 1992
- Publication place: Georgia
- Media type: Print (Hardback)
- Pages: 222 pages
- ISBN: 978-1564789273

Journey to Karabakh is a 1992 novel by Georgian writer Aka Morchiladze, his first. Set in the First Nagorno-Karabakh War (1988 – 1994), the novel depicts the misadventures of a Georgian youth who is accidentally caught up in the conflict.

In 2005 film director Levan Tutberidze made a film based on this novel.

== Plot ==
Gio, a young Georgian, falls in love with a prostitute and experiences with her two of the happiest months of his life. When his father forces him to break off the relationship, he becomes deeply depressed. He accompanies a friend, who wants to buy drugs in Azerbaijan, on his journey over the border.

In the darkness, the duo stray onto a remote country track and are arrested by an Azerbaijani patrol. They are in Karabakh, in the middle of the war. The supposedly "cool" young men from Tbilisi have no idea what is going on. Their car and their money are seized and they are thrown into a cell already occupied by an Armenian prisoner.

Events then unfold with lightning speed. Armenian fighters free their friend and the Georgians with him. Gio finds himself in an Armenian village where he is not mistreated but his every move is watched. When Russian journalists visit the village, Gio – along with two Azerbaijani prisoners and a Russian hostage – manages to flee and he makes his way safely back to the Azerbaijani base, where he is hailed a hero. His friend is still there and his purple Lada is still parked on the same spot. Only the money is gone. His friend is given a packet of drugs and a gun as compensation. Then they return to their old lives in Tbilisi.

== Translations ==
The novel has been translated into several languages, including English, German, Italian, Russian and Ukrainian.
