= Yevgeny Sidikhin =

Russian actor

- Евгений Сидихин
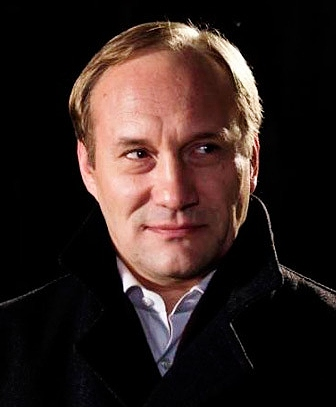
- Born: Yevgeny Vladimirovich Sidikhin; Leningrad, Russian SFSR, Soviet Union (now Saint Petersburg, Russia)
- Occupation: Film actor
- Years active: 1989–present
- Spouse: Tatyana Borkovskaya
- Children: 3
- Awards: State Prize of the Russian Federation
- Website: sidikhin.narod.ru

Yevgeny Vladimirovich Sidikhin (Russian: Евге́ний Влади́мирович Сиди́хин) is a Russian film and theater actor and television presenter.

== Early life and education ==
Sidikhin was born in Leningrad, Russian SFSR, Soviet Union (now Saint Petersburg, Russia). He studied martial arts and boxing from the 4th grade and was a five-time champion in the City of Leningrad.

After high school he was accepted into the Leningrad State Institute of Theater, Music, and Cinematography (LGITMiK). However, in his freshman year, he was drafted into the army. He served in Turkmenistan and in the military intelligence in Afghanistan. After completing his service, he returned to LGITMiK and graduated in 1989.

== Career ==
He worked at the Lensovet Theater and the Tovstonogov Bolshoi Drama Theater and had a brief career of a talk show host at the Russian television channel NTV. He starred in his first film in 1991. Many of his roles take advantage of his martial arts skills and good looks; however, he always plays the emotional and human side of the character.

== Awards ==
- 2000 – State Prize of Russia (for the film The Barracks)
- 2002 – Best Actor in a Foreign Film at the film festival Constellation for 27 Missing Kisses
- 2003 – Best Male Role in The Ark at the film festival Faces of Love in Moscow
- 2003 – Diploma for Performing Excellence at the film festival of Slavic and Eastern Orthodox Peoples Golden Knight (Zolotoy Vityaz) for the film Between Life and Death
- 2004 – Golden Eagle (Zolotoi Oryol) for the best male role in the TV series The Cab Driver

== Personal life ==
Yevgeny Sidikhin is married to actress Tatyana Borkovskaya and they have three daughters. His hobby is sailing yachts.

== Selected filmography ==
| Year | Title | Role | Notes |
|---|---|---|---|
| 1991 | Behind the Last Line | Victor Dremov | |
| 1991 | The Countess | Nikita Shuvalov | |
| 1992 | The Executioner | Yuri Kirsanov | |
| 1992 | Moscow Parade | Gosha | |
| 1993 | Children of Iron Gods | Ignat Morozov | |
| 1993 | Operation Lucifer | Detective Zabelin | |
| 1993 | The Last Saturday | Oleg | |
| 1994 | Two Brothers, One Sister | Brother | |
| 1994 | Russian Transit | Alexander | |
| 1995 | Wolf Blood | Rodion Dobrykh | |
| 1995 | Vaska Easoff | Vanka | Nominated for Best Foreign Language Film Oscar |
| 1996 | Gisele's Mania | Boris Kaplun | |
| 1997 | Burnt by the Frost | Lasov | |
| 1998 (2005) | Mama Don't Cry | Zubek | |
| 1998 | Threesome | Kostya | |
| 1999 | The Barracks | Precinct police lieutenant | |
| 2000–2006 | Bandit Petersburg 1-10 | Kudasov | |
| 2000 | 27 Missing Kisses | Alexander | |
| 2000 | House for the Rich | Alexei Serebriakov | |
| 2001 | Achilles' Heel | Maxim | |
| 2001 | Russian Beauty | Yuri | |
| 2001 | Salomeya | Fyodor Yalikov | |
| 2001 | The Cricket on the Hearth | John | |
| 2002 | Antikiller | Barkass | |
| 2002 | Backstage | Anatoly Ivanovich Kuskov | |
| 2002 | The Ark | Skipper | |
| 2002 | Falling Up | Mason | |
| 2002 | Spetsnaz | Bezrukov (episode 7) | |
| 2003 | White Gold | Lomov | |
| 2003 | Private Lives of Official Persons | Anatoly | |
| 2003 | Between Life and Death | Ian | |
| 2003 | The Cab Driver | Ilya Orlov | |
| 2004 | Women in the Game Without Rules | Pavel Vesnin | |
| 2004 | Big Girls' Games | Vitalik | |
| 2004–2005 | MUR is MUR | Alexander Ivanovich Smirnov, a detective | |
| 2005 | Tale about Happiness | Victor Deryabin | |
| 2006 | Family Dinner | Victorov | |
| 2007 | Kisses of Fallen Angels | Roman | |
| 2007 | After Life | Artem | |
| 2008 | A Woman in Berlin, a.k.a. Anonyma - Eine Frau in Berlin, with Nina Hoss, directed by Max Färberböck | Andrei Rybkin, a Soviet officer | Received The Best International Film Award at the Santa Barbara International Film Festival, February 2009 |
| 2008 | Bes, a.k.a. Demon | Nikita | |
| 2008 | The North Wind | Vasily Klintsov | |
| 2008 | Ice Kiss | Shevchenko, a KGB officer | |
| 2008 | Dead Souls | General Shalamov | |
| 2009 | Attack on Leningrad | Korneyev | |
| 2009 | The Inhabited Island | Father-in-Law | |
| 2013 | Pyotr Leschenko. Everything That Was... | Colonel | |
| 2016 | In the Forests of Siberia | Aleksei | |
| 2018 | Never Look Away | | |
| 2020 | Passengers | Anatoly | TV series |
| 2026 | Angels of War | Smetanin | |
