= Of Old Hearts and Swords =

2007 novel by Aka Morchiladze

- Author: Aka Morchiladze
- Original title: ძველი გულებისა და ხმლისა
- Translator: Elizabeth Heighway
- Language: Georgian
- Series: Georgian Literature Series
- Genre: Historical fiction Novel
- Publisher: Dalkey Archive Press
- Publication date: 2007 (December 8, 2015 in English)
- Publication place: Georgia
- Media type: Print (Hardback)
- Pages: 112 pages
- ISBN: 978-1628971255

Of Old Hearts and Swords is a 2007 novel by Georgian writer Aka Morchiladze. In 2013 it was published in Sweden and in 2015 in England.

== Translations ==
The novel has been translated into several languages, including English as Of Old Hearts and Swords and Swedish as Spegelriket.
