= The Good Thief (film) =

2002 film by Neil Jordan

- Original movie poster
- Directed by: Neil Jordan
- Written by: Neil Jordan
- Based on: Bob le flambeur by Jean-Pierre Melville; Auguste Le Breton
- Produced by: Seaton McLean; John Wells; Stephen Woolley; Neil Jordan
- Starring: Nick Nolte; Emir Kusturica; Nutsa Kukhianidze
- Cinematography: Chris Menges
- Edited by: Tony Lawson
- Music by: Elliot Goldenthal
- Production company: Alliance Atlantis
- Distributed by: Momentum Pictures (United Kingdom and Ireland); TFM Distribution (France)
- Release dates: 6 September 2002 (Toronto); 28 February 2003 (Ireland); 7 March 2003 (United Kingdom); 4 April 2003 (United States); 11 April 2003 (Canada); 13 August 2003 (France)
- Running time: 108 minutes
- Countries: United Kingdom; France; Ireland
- Language: English
- Budget: $30 million
- Box office: $5,756,945

The Good Thief is a 2002 crime thriller heist film written and directed by Neil Jordan. It is a remake of the French film Bob le flambeur (1955) by Jean-Pierre Melville. The film, shot in both Monaco and Nice, France, follows a heroin-addicted retired thief through the setup and completion of one last job.

== Cast ==
- Nick Nolte as Bob Montagnet
- Emir Kusturica as Vladimir
- Nutsa Kukhianidze as Anne
- Tchéky Karyo as Roger
- Saïd Taghmaoui as Paulo
- Patricia Kell as Yvonne
- Gérard Darmon as Raoul
- Julien Maurel as Philippe
- Sarah Bridges as Philipa
- Ralph Fiennes as Tony Angel (uncredited)

== Reception ==
The film received mostly positive reviews. Critic Roger Ebert notes of Nolte: "it is clear, that he was born to play Bob. It is one of those performances that flows unhindered from an actor's deepest instincts."

Reviewer Pam Grady, writing for Reel.com, also praised the film: "The Good Thief has many virtues, beginning with the sheer wit of Jordan's screenplay and Chris Menges's neon-saturated cinematography that renders Nice both beautiful and sinister, trapping the characters in the glare of its lights. The heist itself is a complicated affair – Jordan took Melville's original idea and added a distinctly 21st-century twist – and all the more satisfying for it."

The film holds a 77% 'fresh' rating on Rotten Tomatoes, based on 146 reviews, and an average rating of 6.9/10. The website's critical consensus reads, "Bolstered by Nolte's strong performance, The Good Thief brims with seductive style." On Metacritic, the film has a weighted average score of 68 out of 100, based on 37 critics, indicating "generally favorable reviews".

== Soundtrack ==
The film's score was composed by Elliot Goldenthal.
