= The Bill series 15 =

The Bill
- Series 15
- No. of episodes: 87

Release
- Original network: ITV
- Original release: 7 January – 31 December 1999

Series chronology
- ← Previous; Series 14 Next → Series 16

The fifteenth series of The Bill, a British television drama, consists of 87 episodes, broadcast between 7 January and 31 December 1999. The series saw a notable change, as female officers were no longer introduced by the "W" prefix in ranking, with the last mention of this when Liz Rawton was introduced as a WDC in "Follow Through". By the following episode, "Walking on Water", female characters were simply introduced as PC/DC etc.

On 5 June 2013, The Bill Series 15 Part 1 and 2 and The Bill Series 15 Part 3 and 4 DVD sets were released in Australia.

== Storylines ==
The series was primarily dominated by individual, stand-alone episodes, but serialised plots were also included after being introduced by Richard Handford when he arrived in the previous series; while some of those were multi-part plots that ran over 2–4 episodes, the serialised element of series 15 saw some plots last a majority of the year. They included a brutal stabbing attack on PC Dave Quinnan in the spring, which led to the introduction of Nurse Jenny Delaney, whose love triangle with Quinnan and PC George Garfield led to the exit of Garfield after Huw Higginson's 10-year stint in the role; Quinnan's stabbing was also revisited almost a year after his stabbing in series 16. Also carrying into the following year was the arrest of PC Eddie Santini, which in turn was a continuation of his plot involving actor Michael Higgs' off-screen partner Caroline Catz from the previous year, PC Rosie Fox returning as a DS several months after being bullied out of Sun Hill following a campaign by Santini; this plot ended in the spring but was revisited a year later for Santini's trial.

However, the most notable long-term plot saw DC Jim Carver moved back to uniform as a PC owing to the real-life Metropolitan Police's controversial tenure system, which moved officers out of CID after ten years if they were not considered for promotion or a transfer. Actor Mark Wingett revealed in 2018 during an interview on The Bill Podcast that he and executive producer Richard Handford wanted to highlight the effect it caused on officers who were victims of tenure, and with the tragic death of Wingett's close friend and colleague Kevin Lloyd a year earlier, Wingett and Handford made the decision to make Jim an alcoholic. The plot culminated in Jim being arrested for a murder that occurred while he had blacked out during a binge, providing the catalyst for his recovery; the plot remained relevant to Jim's character right up to his exit in 2005 to highlight the "one day at a time" methodology used by recovering alcoholics.

== Cast changes ==
=== Arrivals ===
- PC Di Worrell (Episode 18–)
- DC Danny Glaze (Episode 30–)
- Chief Supt Guy Mannion (Episode 31-)
- PC Cass Rickman (Episode 38–)
- PC Dale Smith (Episode 44–)
- PC Nick Klein (Episode 56–)
- DS Claire Stanton (Episode 59–)

=== Departures ===
- PC Jamila Blake – Unexplained
- PC Eddie Santini – Jailed for the murder of lover Jess Orton
- AC Trevor Hicks – Retires
- PC Luke Ashton – Resigns after witnessing a murder-suicide (temporary departure)
- PC George Garfield – Resigns after Dave Quinnan and Jenny Delaney's affair
- DC Liz Rawton – Goes from series regular to recurring character after taking role at Hendon in the wake of abduction

== Episodes ==
#	Title	Episode notes	Directed by	Written by	Original air date
1	"Long Term Investment"	Brett Fancy and Nick Wilton guest star	Jonathan Campbell	David G. McDonagh	7 January 1999
Deakin's surveillance on convicted robber Frank Tully's release from custody is immediately blown out when Tully spots them, revealing that his already released partner in crime had told him he was also under surveillance. Deakin then confronts his partner, Richard Hackett, demanding information on a missing ransom payment from a kidnapping 8 years earlier. Deakin sends Holmes undercover as Hackett's girlfriend, but when they set up an observation, Tully pulls a gun on Hackett and Holmes after discovering there is no money in their safety deposit box. Tully is arrested when Hackett reveals the gun is empty, and suspicion turns to bank manager Roger Carlson, who decided to go on holiday the day of the raid. However, when all he is found with is a small bag of heroin in customs, they discover he may have been framed for someone else to steal the money without Hackett or Tully's knowledge.
2	"Chasing Shadows"	Final episode regularly to use "W" designate for female officers; Omid Djalili guest stars	Herbert Wise	Alan Pollock	14 January 1999
Boyden recruits an SO10 officer to go undercover in order to expose an illegal poker ring running out of a local Turkish café. However, when the raid fails, the officer goes missing. As Meadows takes over the investigation, he identifies a Turkish national he failed to arrest during his days at AMIP, and discovers he has been flagged by the Drugs Squad for an importation operation. However, Meadows leads a raid on a warehouse and blows the Drugs Squad's surveillance operation. Joining forces, they discover a scam in which a deliberate crash was caused in Germany so an apparent good Samaritan could have "a mate fix the car" in order to hide drugs in the chassis and smuggle it into the UK undetected. Realising the scam has been rumbled by the SO10 officer, the team fights to track him down before he's silenced.
3	"Follow Through"	Stephen Churchett, Suzanna Hamilton and Abigail Thaw guest star	Tom Cotter	Steve Handley	21 January 1999
Daly and Rawton are seconded to a women's prison run by a friend of Brownlow's after an inmate is savagely assaulted, and things soon escalate when doctors reveal she isn't expected to survive the attack. Suspecting a drug smuggling operation inside the prison is at the centre of it all, Holmes is sent undercover to get on side with the prime suspects, Rita Davis and Jo Merton. Holmes uncovers a scam by Davis to steal phone cards from inmates to sell them back. Holmes identifies a prison officer she thinks might be responsible, but further investigation reveals she has been blackmailed by Davis to smuggle phone cards in. Holmes has Davis transferred to another wing, allowing her to get initiated with Merton, who brings her on board with the drug scam. As she prepares CID for a raid to catch the next shipment, she identifies the real prison officer involved, who is immediately suspicious of Holmes getting initiated so quickly. Will she be exposed before her colleagues can intervene?
4	"Walking on Water"	Ralph Arliss and Rupert Farley guest star	Chris Lovett	Graham Mitchell	26 January 1999
Meadows is furious when a joint operation with Area Drugs to arrest local dealer Danny Rickman is blown out. Stamp and Quinnan attend a library where the attendant has discovered an emailed suicide note. When the IP address identifies the informant for the failed drug raid, Meadows investigates it as a potential murder. The man's wife is quick to mention his terminal cancer diagnosis, but his daughter claims her stepmother was talking to him about euthanasia. Daly is suspicious when he spots Beech with Rickman, but while Beech and Meadows explain it was an authorised visit, Daly can't shake his suspicions that his colleague is up to no good. As Daly pursues Beech to a meeting with Rickman, his cover is blown, and despite Beech revealing Rickman's driver is having an affair with the informant's wife, they end up coming to blows, and Daly ends up in a riverside accident. As Daly tries to prove that Beech is corrupt, his nemesis tries to track down the informant's true killer.
5	"The Wrong Horse"	Final appearance of PC Jamila Blake; Michael Cochrane guest stars	Brian Farnham	Stephen Plaice	28 January 1999
Garfield and Hagen volunteer to protect a jockey due to give evidence against a crooked bookmaker. On offer is a weekend away at the races and a stay in a posh country hotel. While Garfield decides to eye up some of the local totty, Hagen finds herself as the unwilling victim of the jockey's romantic attentions. During the race, the rank outsider manages to come from the back and secure victory, much to Garfield's delight, as it nets him £400. However, Hagen is suspicious, and that night at the hotel, she finds the jockey in the company of the man he is trying to prosecute, with a large amount of money changing hands. While Garfield seduces a friend of the local trainer, Hagen confronts the jockey.
6	"No Love Lost"	Barbara Durkin guest stars	Peter Lydon	Katherine Way	2 February 1999
Boyden, Ashton, and Santini head out for a night in a club, and Boyden bets his PCs that he can pull any girl in the club. Approaching an attractive young blonde, he ends up taking her home. The following morning, Boyden attends an assault on the girl's stepfather and discovers she is only 15. The case soon escalates when the girl's younger sister claims she has been abused by her stepfather's friend, and when Boyden's conquest runs away, she tracks him down and demands he provide her with an alibi for the assault. When Boyden refuses, the girl is arrested for trashing a pub and uses the interview to mention her night of illegal passion with the Sun Hill lothario. As CIB interviews Boyden, Hagen is tasked with taking the girl to a children's home, but she cons her way out of the car and runs off. An off-duty Boyden then goes after the girl, but is unprepared for a discovery during his search.
7	"Pond Life"	Tom Hickey and Morag Siller guest star	Tim Holloway	Matthew Leys	4 February 1999
Meadows recruits Quinnan and Rawton to receive a notorious sex offender, Ray Ballantyne, from another division. However, the DCI's hopes of keeping the Ballantyne's identity a secret are quickly blown by a press leak. As a protest takes place outside the safehouse, Hagen receives a call in CAD that a local boy, Andy O'Donnell, has gone missing. TSG are drafted in to take Ballantyne out of the house and back to Sun Hill, as the protest escalates into a low-scale riot. Meanwhile, Page and McCann interview O'Donnell's friend, who gives a vague description of a man seen with the missing boy that matches Ballantyne. As the protest shifts to Sun Hill, Ballantyne is interviewed about his involvement, and he confesses to seeing O'Donnell and comforting him. As the boy is tracked down after hiding in an abandoned train, he makes a shocking confession about his home life. Back at the station, as Rawton struggles to find a hostel for Ballantyne, a dramatic twist brings a final resolution to the case.
8	"Murder, What Murder?"	Tamzin Malleson and Dido Miles guest star	Derek Lister	Terry Hodgkinson	9 February 1999
Garfield assists the River Police when a decapitated body is pulled out of the Thames. As he clears the scene, he recognises a member of the local press as Carrie Winkler, the journalist he worked with the previous year (in the episode "Deep Secret"). While he doesn't divulge info on the body, Winkler shows him a suspicious camera in her paper's archive block. When Garfield declines to remove the camera, Winkler does, leaving a furious DC with the National Crime Squad confronting Deakin about an intricate surveillance operation to catch a notorious armed robber meeting with his banker to access £15 million of unrecovered cash from a series of robberies. Garfield is surprised when he identifies the body of the man through a pacemaker found post-mortem, but his next of kin are left delighted by the news, as the man was an abusive drunk. When Winkler resumes the NCS surveillance without permission, she reveals the robber's money man is registered to Garfield's body. Suspecting the money man has committed murder and stolen the deceased's identity, Deakin liaises with the NCS to nail a robber and a murderer in one fell swoop. Garfield contemplates a holiday to France with Winkler.
9	"Age of Chivalry"	Ben Walden and Clare Wilkie guest star	Steve Shill	Simon Moss	11 February 1999
Burnside is seconded to Sun Hill to catch a pair of serial rapists operating in the area. As Burnside tracks down a known sex offender, he grills him for his whereabouts, but a call soon comes in that there has been another attack. Consulting the victim, who got a good view of the suspect, Burnside leads to an undercover team to a restaurant and the victim identifies a waiter. As the man continues to shut down questions in interview, Rawton consults the man's parents, and they identify a colleague who they feel is a bad influence on their son. Discovering that the man's car matches the description identified by a victim, a claim is made that blows the case wide open. When the pair is bailed, they slip surveillance, and one of them is found seriously assaulted. This episode was broadcast out of production order - using the newer closing titles and fonts not officially introduced until later in the series
10	"Slinging Mud"	JoAnne Good and Kenneth Colley guest star	Harry Bradbeer	David Hoskins	18 February 1999
Deakin is approached by a station cleaner who claims to have found £5000 in used notes under Proctor's desk. Proctor refutes knowledge of it, but timing couldn't be worse, as he is due to testify in a court case later in the day. The case is run by Meadows, but first their witness is subject to intimidation, then Meadows is stunned by late evidence of a bank account in his name containing £86,000 in laundered cash. Knowing another CIB enquiry could be detrimental to his career, bringing back memories of his demotion 7 years earlier, he enlists the help of his department to blow open the allegations and save his career. When a link is made to their prime witness, they enlist her help to identify the man at the centre of the conspiracy to frame Meadows and get the suspect cleared of charges.
11	"Under Duress"	Zelda Tinska and Connor McIntyre guest star	David Moore	Dale Overton	23 February 1999
Boulton and Rawton attend the scene of a house fire, and not only does the chief identify the building as a brothel, but also he points at evidence that the girls were held hostage by the building owner. Hollis and Page attend when a girl is apprehended by shop security for stealing a jacket, and she admits to being a Turkish refugee who has been held against her will to work in the brothel. However, when Boulton identifies needle marks on her arms, he plays the brute to identify a friend of the girl's Maya, who he suspects started the fire to rescue the girls. Identifying a yellow sports car with black writing at the scene, suspected of being Maya's getaway car, and he soon calls around local brothels to identify a rival pimp who took Maya in. He identifies a pair of Turkish brothers, and when Rawton visits a potential witness, she finds herself in unexpected danger. Unaware of her peril, they discover the location of their suspects, unaware they are in a race against time to save their colleague.
12	"Sleeping With the Enemy"	New titles font with grey back-shadow effect and new end titles visuals including black female radio operator added; Glynis Barber, Lorraine Chase, Lloyd McGuire and Brian Regan guest star	Jo Johnson	A. Valentine	25 February 1999
Skase and Lennox enlist the help of Burnside as they investigate a series of robberies at local business conventions. Burnside is reluctant to admit why but he identifies their suspect through a tattoo described by a victim of theft, a former prostitute using the alias Victoria Smith. He later admits to Holmes that she tied him up and left him in nothing but a raincoat while she robbed him during an undercover op when Burnside was a newly-promoted DC. Lennox and Skase go undercover at the latest convention, and while Skase pulls, he is forced to abandon his attractive companion at the revelation that she is an innocent who was actually attracted to him. Lennox has better luck, but when he and his companion go back to the hotel room, she drugs him and steals his laptop. When the woman is found in hospital, having been attacked by one of her victims, Burnside launches a raid to arrest her and Smith. As the raid goes down, Burnside reacquaints with an unsuspecting Smith as he seeks revenge for his humiliation.
13	"Responsibility"	First appearance of Nurse Jenny Delaney; Peter Copley, Freda Dowie, Roland Manookian and Ian Puleston-Davies guest star	Nick Laughland, Ian White and Delyth Thomas	Scott Cherry, Neil Clarke and Len Collin	2 March 1999
14	"Responsibility"	First appearance of Nurse Jenny Delaney; Peter Copley, Freda Dowie, Roland Manookian and Ian Puleston-Davies guest star	Nick Laughland, Ian White and Delyth Thomas	Scott Cherry, Neil Clarke and Len Collin	4 March 1999
15	"Responsibility"	First appearance of Nurse Jenny Delaney; Peter Copley, Freda Dowie, Roland Manookian and Ian Puleston-Davies guest star	Nick Laughland, Ian White and Delyth Thomas	Scott Cherry, Neil Clarke and Len Collin	18 March 1999
Badlands: CID are fuming when Boulton cancels his leave to investigate the latest in a long line of vicious robberies on the Jasmine Allen Estate in which elderly people have been doused in petrol and threatened with lighters, the most recent involving an elderly lady and her blind sister. Rawton identifies the prime suspect as Mick Glover, who is under surveillance by Daly, Quinnan, and Garfield. Boulton's heavy-handed tactics lead to Quinnan and Garfield's informant being threatened by Glover's son Ben, suspected of being Mick's partner on the robberies. Boulton leads a disastrous raid and arrests Mick Glover, but another attack leaves Boulton under further pressure. When Quinnan chases a suspect who has attacked their informant's home, he finds himself led into an ambush, putting his life in danger. Eyes Everywhere: The relief remains in a state of shock following Quinnan's stabbing. As medical staff try their utmost to stop Dave bleeding to death on the operating table, Brownlow calls uniform in to quell anger and stop them unleashing their fury on the suspects. However, it soon becomes apparent to management that the relief lay the blame firmly at the feet of Boulton for his ill-fated raid on Mick Glover. When Boulton makes a comment on Quinnan not wearing his stab vest, Garfield attacks the rogue DS. The relief launches a major raid on the estate but fails to find Ben Glover; however, he later stuns Boulton by calling him, offering his own father in exchange for a lesser sentence. News comes through from hospital with an update on Quinnan's condition that stuns the relief. Yesterday's Hero: Quinnan recovers in hospital after his attack. He bonds with his nurse, Jenny, but finds himself harangued by media outlets for interviews, and ends up snapping at Garfield when he mentions Boulton. After feeling he is subject to preferential treatment, he goes onto a public ward and befriends a stabbing victim with a grudge against the police, but while he claims the police haven't worked hard enough to find his assailant, Quinnan soon finds out there's more to the story. Meadows warns Boulton to build bridges in the wake of Quinnan's attack, with Hollis and Garfield seconded to a CID operation to catch a drug dealer. However, tensions boil over once more, and Garfield ends up assaulting Boulton again. With the operation needing a second day, Boulton is forced to eat humble pie and get Garfield back on side, while Hollis tries to get Garfield to admit his helplessness over Quinnan's attack.
16	"On Air"	Tommy Boyd, Amanda Abbington and David Ross guest star	Brian Farnham	Len Collin	23 March 1999
Hagen and Santini find a shaken woman at her home after an abandoned 999 call. Holmes spearheads the investigation when the victim reports a violent prowler tormented her about committing rape before fleeing without touching her, leaving Holmes at loggerheads with Carver when she reopens a prowler case investigated two years earlier, with Holmes suspecting their suspect is getting bolder. Meanwhile, Conway is preparing for a radio talk show Q&A, but when Holmes requests that he make an appeal about the prowler attack, Conway is stunned by a call from a man who identifies himself as the suspect. As Deakin, Holmes, and Carver hunt for their suspect, a victim comes forward and joins Conway on air. As she talks to her tormentor, Conway tries to rile the man, causing the victim to storm out. However, the discovery that he has broken into another home and is holding a woman hostage leaves his previous victim determined to help, and the team goes all out to find their suspect and stop his next victim coming to harm.
17	"To Catch a Cobra"	Nadim Sawalha guest stars	Tom Cotter	Manjit Singh	25 March 1999
Burnside's failure to inform Sun Hill of a Crime OCU stakeout on a local museum leads to Page and Harker blowing their cover. The group arrest three of the four robbers, but one is admitted to hospital for trying to swallow stolen gemstones. Meanwhile, Meadows sends Boulton on the trail of stolen war medals, but the robbery at the museum puts Boulton back on the trail of known villain, Atul Roy, whom he had hunted for a kidnapping two years earlier (Shades of Gray S13). To spite Boulton and Burnside, Roy's brother Amit leads a second raid on the museum. Forced to admit he has been running a 15-year-old informant, the boy tells them where to find the ringleader for the raid. As Amit is arrested in possession of the museum artefacts, Henderson tells them their informant has gone missing, forcing them to cut a deal for the boy's safety.
18	"Weekends are for Wimps"	First appearance of PC Di Worrell; George Sewell guest stars	Jo Shoop	Nigel Baldwin	30 March 1999
Conway is furious when Meadows asks him to cover for Brownlow due to a bout of flu. Determined to make it to Stamford Bridge for a game between Chelsea and West Ham, he is fuming when he is called in to take a sample for a rape case. To make matters worse, the victim drops the allegation before he arrives. Meanwhile, Hagen and Santini arrest a drunk driver for assaulting Hagen during a pursuit. As they prepare to bail him, Lennox recognises him as a suspect for a series of armed robberies. Conway tries to get on the case but Lennox calls in Meadows, who turns up sick but determined to sit in on the interview. Cryer and Harker investigate claims that an ex-con has been kidnapped by a retired Chief Superintendent, an old friend of Conway's. Enlisting Conway's help, Cryer confronts the ex-cop to get to the truth of the matter. With something clearly missing, it's the retired officer's daughter who supplies the link between Meadows and Conway's cases.
19	"Piggy in the Middle"	Final appearance of DC Scott Henderson; Teresa Gallagher and Philip McGough guest star	Brian Parker	Clive Dawson	1 April 1999
Ashton intervenes as a pair of masked men try to set fire to a house. Burnside is seconded from Crime OCU to investigate, due to another arson with the same MO occurring on Stafford Row's patch. Meanwhile, Holmes is approached by a witness in the case of a vicious stabbing attack who has suddenly decided not to testify. It is soon revealed that the attempted arson attack victim is the brother-in-law of the witness, and that the other witness is the boyfriend of the woman hospitalised in the Stafford Row. With two out of three witnesses attacked, it's not long before Holmes is assaulted in a pub car park after a night out. An informant of Holmes reveals that stabbing suspect's brother, Kevin Butcher, has sparked a dealing war on the local estate, and Meadows is livid with Burnside's behaviour as Kerry becomes subject to a series of attacks by Butcher's gang. Holmes, despite repeated warnings to steer clear of the case, makes a major breakthrough that could explain why they are struggling to solve the intimidation and dealing cases.
20	"Sex, Lies and Videotape"	Ruth Gemmell, Beverly Hills and Michael Elwyn guest star	Paul Murton	Tony Mulholland	6 April 1999
Brownlow has agreed for a fly-on-the-wall documentary crew to film in the station. Boulton and Carver soon become the subject of their attentions, as they film a raid on a drug dealer that Boulton has been eyeing up for some time. Meanwhile, Boyden and Worrell investigate when a prostitute is attacked and her hair is cut off. When Boulton's raid goes pear-shaped, he stops his prime target just as he is about to reach for his gun. The prostitute that Boyden and Worrell have been helping surfaces in the back room, and manages to escape, taking the prime target's gun with her. The film crew then accuses Boulton of attacking a suspect for no reason when the director says that she didn't see a gun.
21	"Out and About"	Final appearance of SRO Marion Layland; Adele Silva guest stars	Pip Broughton	Richard Stoneman	8 April 1999
Quinnan returns to work after his stabbing. Questions are raised about his capabilities, and when he manhandles a suspect, Stamp thinks he's losing it. However, he goes from overboard to lax when he attends a death notice, opting against returning to duty by talking to the man whose wife has been killed. Realising the man is a former soldier who is being bullied by his upstairs neighbour, Quinnan bottles a noise complaint call, and the neighbour is later found beaten and sprayed with CS gas. Hollis clashes with Garfield over his handling of Quinnan's attack, and out of spite, Hollis mentions Quinnan disappearing on shift to Brownlow. As the relief tries to track Quinnan down, he shows up at Sun Hill, and while they try to clear his name with the assault victim, Boyden gives Quinnan a chance to prove himself to the relief once and for all.
22	"Kiss Chase"	—	Dominic Lees	Maxwell Young	13 April 1999
Ashton is left moody ahead of an impending domestic violence court case as the victim's daughter begins stalking him. Just as he is due to give evidence, she confronts him and claims she is pregnant. The girl proceeds to fall apart in the witness box, causing the case to collapse. As Cryer tries to get to the bottom of the claims, he warns her that Ashton has launched a counterclaim for harassment. When the girl's mother goes back to her abusive husband, he shows up at the station intent on making complaints against Ashton and Cryer. Conway is livid when Ashton admits he did sleep with the girl, but as Ashton talks to the girl and decides not to pursue a harassment charge, she attempts suicide after he implores her to have an abortion, landing him in deeper waters. This episode was broadcast out of production order - using the older closing titles and fonts last used earlier in the series
23	"On the Road"	Ronald Pickup and David Spinx guest star	Audrey Cooke	Chris Ould	15 April 1999
Lennox and Rawton go to Salisbury to bring in a con-man, George Riordian, for questioning, but he proves to be a slippery customer when he first gives them the slip at a service station, and then later on absconds altogether when the car they are travelling in breaks down and Lennox has to pull over to repair it. The pair manage to find a missing £50,000, which Riordian supposedly stole from one of his victims, Stella Kauffman, but then Riordian appears at the station the following day to hand himself in. When Kauffman then announces she is withdrawing the charges against Riordian, Lennox realises that the whole incident has been a con from the start and that he and Rawton have been had. This episode was broadcast out of production order - using the older closing titles and fonts last used earlier in the series
24	"Pressure Point"	Ged Simmons, Adele Silva and John Barrard guest star	Brian Parker	Rod Beacham	20 April 1999
Proctor and Lennox find themselves at the cutting edge of forensic science when they try to solve a burglary case, where the burglar has left an 'earprint' at the scene. Meanwhile, Proctor receives a call from a woman who reports having information about a serious crime. She reports that she was a witness to an assault that Carver and Skase have been investigating, where they are unable to prove their prime suspect is responsible. Proctor tries to convince her to testify, but she does a disappearing act. Proctor then discovers she is having an affair, which is making her scared to testify. When her boyfriend is found beaten up, Proctor heads straight for his prime suspect and discovers the weapon used. This episode was broadcast out of production order - using the older closing titles and fonts last used earlier in the series
25	"Look Away Now"	Adele Silva guest stars	James Cellan Jones	Michael Jenner	22 April 1999
Monroe notifies uniform of a private investigation group conducting surveillance on a local criminal family, the Drakes, who have already received a flurry of complaints from their new neighbours. Harker deals with their direct neighbour when he reports he has been victimised and subject to a robbery of his bank card. Harker ends up at odds with Beech when the rogue DS manipulates Harker's words to launch a drugs raid on the home, and winds the PC up further by spreading a rumour that he and Holmes are an item. With the drugs raid failing, Harker employs the father to give up his oldest son, Eamonn, before he can manipulate his two brothers any further, when Eamonn savagely attacks another neighbour for talking to the police. As they stage a second obbo on the Drake household, the PI van is attacked, but events take a sinister turn that sees the Drakes get a reality check.
26	"A Question of Trust"	Dean Harris guest stars	Audrey Cooke	Julian Spilsbury	27 April 1999
27	"A Question of Trust"	Dean Harris guest stars	Audrey Cooke	Julian Spilsbury	29 April 1999
Part One: Boulton and Skase get a major lead from an informant on local armed robber Anthony Payne, who has been off the radar for a number of years. Boulton is determined to nail him, but the rest of CID think he's being excessive in his approach due to Daly being named Acting DI ahead of him in Deakin's absence. The raid nearly goes perfectly, but Payne escapes and attacks Boulton while he's in pursuit. Skase ends up split up from his DS, and when he catches up to him, Boulton is pulling Payne's lifeless body out of a creek. After CPR fails, CIB is called in to investigate the death in custody. Rumours and speculation are rife, and Boulton's approach with CIB leads to a reprimand about his attitude ahead of an inquest. His day gets only worse when his informant turns against him after being bought by Payne's brother. Can the rogue DS survive with his career intact? Part Two: Boulton prepares to face an inquest for the death in custody of notorious armed robber Anthony Payne. Payne's brother Stephen continues to rile the media as he vows to end Boulton's career, but while Boulton isn't doing himself any favours, his colleagues investigate Payne's brother over claims by a woman identifying his voice from radio and TV, stating Stephen Payne savagely assaulted her now-deceased husband and fatally shot their dog during a burglary two years earlier. While Boulton is sceptical that it will do any good at the inquest, the involvement in the burglaries of informant Terry Riley gives them hope that the leverage will make him change his mind about his so-called recollection of Payne's death.
28	"True Lies"	Rachel Davies and Ian Redford guest star	Jeremy Silberston	Jaden Clarke	4 May 1999
Boyden tasks Garfield and Ashton with setting up an observation on a parade of shops where a gang of young dealers have been operating. When they catch a youngster taking a package left behind by a dealer, a search of his home uncovers a log of transactions. The pair hope they've found their ringleader, until Cryer identifies the boy and his mother of the family of a Barton Street sergeant who died of a heart attack during a raid a few months earlier. Admitting he has been tailing the ringleaders to supply Barton Street with information, the boy agrees to help Garfield and Ashton bring down the gang responsible. Meanwhile, an old flame of Boyden's approaches Harker with info on an armed robbery involving her husband. Boyden is sceptical, but Harker is convinced of her story when she says her son is involved and she wants him to avoid punishment. However, when the raid goes ahead and the boy dies after being hit by a car during his attempts to escape the scene, Harker discovers all is not as it seems.
29	"Back to Basics"	Connie Hyde and Gordon Warnecke guest star	Albert Barber	Simon Sharkey	6 May 1999
Carver is devastated when his final transfer appeal is turned down, ending his hopes of remaining a DC and avoiding tenure. The news that the system is due to be scrapped is even more of an annoyance to Carver, who faces leaving Sun Hill after 14 years. Determined not to lose his local knowledge and experience, Ackland implores him to seek a voluntary transfer to Sun Hill's uniform and exit CID early. His final day in CID sees him pressed by Daly to investigate two cases at once, assisting a bank security manager over disappearing money and a gang of shoplifters running amok. Carver is furious that Skase is insistent on pursuing the case at the bank as a priority, telling him he's interested only because he fancies the security manager, and events escalate when the gang hospitalise a shop owner. However, Skase continues pursuing the bank case with Rawton, and they end up uncovering a major fraud, while Carver teams up with McCann to track down the shoplifting gang.
30	"Makeover"	First appearance of DC Danny Glaze; DC Jim Carver returns to PC; Nitin Ganatra and Jamie Sives guest star	Derek Lister	Nicholas McInerny	11 May 1999
Carver returns to uniform amidst mocking from his colleagues, but he is determined to prove he is up to the job. He is paired with Ashton and attends an assault on a pub, investigating a link to the Baker brothers, who have committed a series of assaults in the area. He is disappointed to see Skase continuing the investigation with the new DC, Danny Glaze. Having failed to nail them during his time in CID, he fights to prove their guilt and get one over on Skase by putting pressure on an associate of the Baker brothers. However, his distraction puts Ashton at risk when he is left alone to tackle a gang of shoplifters. Meanwhile, Garfield and Worrell investigate claims by a landlord he is being victimised by his tenants, but Carver and Ashton later find the man locking a suspect in a closet.
31	"Tinderbox"	First appearance of Ch Supt Guy Mannion, first episode broadcast in widescreen	Tom Cotter	Stephen Plaice	18 May 1999
Tension, drama and comical mishaps abound as Brownlow, Meadows and Conway head to the Yorkshire Moors for an orientation course alongside the top brass from Barton Street. The tension builds as Conway backs out of the rock climbing due to his fear of heights, and Meadows is reprimanded by the instructor for both abandoning Conway to complete the test alone and his continual attempts to contact Daly as he tries to keep abreast of the investigation into an armed robber, who has stunned CID by suddenly handing himself into custody. Meanwhile, Brownlow clashes with his Barton Street counterpart Guy Mannion, a fast-track young go-getter who is prime candidate to rival Brownlow for the Borough Commander post. As the teams are tasked with crossing the Moors, Meadows plots an escape, but they unite in their determination to beat the Barton Street contingent after discovering they have used the Stafford Row team's knowledge of the course to give them an edge.
32	"Set-Up"	Lee Turnbull guest stars	Brian Parker	Hugh Ellis	25 May 1999
Holmes is subject to scepticism when she investigates an attack on the daughter of a gypsy. Boulton is forced to work the case despite his mind being on an interview panel as he seeks a transfer. As he tries to dissuade Holmes for pursuing the case, she goes on an unauthorised OBBO at the family's caravan and is proven right, as an arson attack destroys the caravan and kills the family's dog. As CID toy with Boulton as he rushes to get to his interview, Holmes touches base with a friend who is a DI on the panel for Boulton, and he agrees to grill Boulton and provide a copy of the video taping the review. When the interview goes horrendously wrong, Boulton storms out, and Holmes revels in showing the tape to rest of CID. Despite being the victim of a cruel practical joke, Deakin has no sympathy for the rogue DS as he lays down the law, while Meadows reprimands Holmes. He then forces Boulton and Holmes to pair up to solve the arson attack on the gypsy family, as the fire forensics officer reveals it was a deliberate attempt to kill them, but the pursuit of the culprits leaves the warring colleagues in danger.
33	"The Downfall of Eddie Santini"	Final regular appearance of PC Eddie Santini; guest appearance of now-DS Rosie Fox; first appearance of DS Paul Timpney; Frederick Treves, Jason O'Mara and Frank Jarvis guest star	Steve Shill, Phillipa Langdale, Robert Del Maestro and Ian White	Rod Lewis and Elizabeth Anne-Wheal	1 June 1999
34	"The Downfall of Eddie Santini"	Final regular appearance of PC Eddie Santini; guest appearance of now-DS Rosie Fox; first appearance of DS Paul Timpney; Frederick Treves, Jason O'Mara and Frank Jarvis guest star	Steve Shill, Phillipa Langdale, Robert Del Maestro and Ian White	Rod Lewis and Elizabeth Anne-Wheal	8 June 1999
35	"The Downfall of Eddie Santini"	Final regular appearance of PC Eddie Santini; guest appearance of now-DS Rosie Fox; first appearance of DS Paul Timpney; Frederick Treves, Jason O'Mara and Frank Jarvis guest star	Steve Shill, Phillipa Langdale, Robert Del Maestro and Ian White	Rod Lewis and Elizabeth Anne-Wheal	15 June 1999
36	"The Downfall of Eddie Santini"	Final regular appearance of PC Eddie Santini; guest appearance of now-DS Rosie Fox; first appearance of DS Paul Timpney; Frederick Treves, Jason O'Mara and Frank Jarvis guest star	Steve Shill, Phillipa Langdale, Robert Del Maestro and Ian White	Rod Lewis and Elizabeth Anne-Wheal	22 June 1999
Lone Ranger: Santini goes out of his way to secure a transfer to the Drugs Squad, liaising with DS Timpney as he seduces a local club owner, Jess Orton. When she offers him a major lead on a dealer called Ferguson, they arrange a meeting with Santini posing undercover as her husband, Steve. However, his determination to investigate the drugs leads him to neglect a burglary crackdown, and he is reprimanded by Cryer when a retired Army major has his medals stolen by the burglary gang. Santini gets a lead on the robberies, but he passes it on to Carver, info that the Meals-on-Wheels vans are being tailed by the burglars. However, Santini discovers all is not as it seems with the major's burglary; can he solve that case and get himself out of hot water with Cryer? Old Flame: Santini is furious when he spies Jess Orton meeting with the drugs kingpin, Ferguson, behind his back, but after confronting her over her involvement outside her club, she runs back inside, and it explodes. With 3 bodies pulled from the wreckage, Santini identifies Orton's husband, Steve, as one of the deceased. However, that shock pales in comparison to the discovery that the AMIP team investigating the fire includes his nemesis, former Sun Hill PC Rosie Fox, who is now a DS. Fox is immediately suspicious of Santini, especially when she discovers his involvement with Orton, who has vanished in the wake of the blaze. Ferguson rumbles Santini's cover and admits the firebombing, so he gives Santini an ultimatum: tell Orton to confess to the firebombing, or he will go down for it. Push It: Santini is determined to track down Jess Orton after Ferguson's ultimatum, while he is arranged to do a drugs pickup in Amsterdam in her place. He tracks her down at her daughter's home and tells her what Ferguson has demanded. Eventually swayed, Orton is arrested and confesses to firebombing her club. However, Fox is unconvinced and thinks she's being coached by Santini in interview, so she bails her in the absence of DCI Pallister. However, Fox sticks the knife in with her nemesis and implies Orton has told her about Santini's unauthorised undercover op with DS Timpney, causing Santini to confront Orton and demand answers. As a struggle ensues, disaster strikes. Kiss Off: Santini is left reeling after his accidental killing of Jess Orton. As he briefs Ferguson, he demands an exit out of the country, but Ferguson wants him to meet his boss, Sherman, first. Hagen finds Santini's ticket to Amsterdam, and growing ever suspicious after finding what she is yet to discover are Orton's keys under Santini's mattress, goes to see DS Timpney for more info. Meanwhile, Pallister warns Fox that if they can prove Orton was murdered, she will face criminal charges for releasing her from custody and into the clutches of the drug kingpins, unaware that Santini is actually responsible for her death. After being told she has been pulled from the Orton case, Fox goes off on her own bat and follows Ferguson, only to be abducted by him and Sherman's henchmen. Blowing Santini's cover, it's up to Timpney and Pallister to rescue Santini, with the pair unaware Fox has been drawn into the events.
37	"Foreign Body"	90-minute special	Chris Lovett	Tom Needham	24 June 1999
Responding to an armed robbery at a hotel, Hagen, Carver, Harker, and Worrell are held at gunpoint by a French man who speaks no English, and as he flees the scene, he narrowly misses Stamp and Page before swerving into a parked car. Dying on impact, the group checks his car, finding a dead woman in the boot. CID trawls through the Mis-Pers, while Holmes attends the post-mortem. The victim is identified as Carole Archer, and after their robber is cleared of murder by the post-mortem, her husband Peter Archer is identified as their prime suspect due to claims he was off to France to find Carole. Deakin is keen to take the investigation to France, but when Meadows usurps him, Deakin tells him to take Skase after witnessing his appalling attempt at the French language. Deakin is thrilled when he discovers Archer has booked the ferry back, but his hopes are quashed when not only does Archer not board the ferry, but also they discover he has previously been suspected of killing his first wife.
38	"Borderline"	First appearance of PC Cass Rickman; Richard Mylan guest stars	Christopher Hodson	Stephen Plaice	29 June 1999
Meadows leads an ill-fated drugs raid but uncovers a gun, convinced it is linked to the drive-by shooting of a rival dealer. New PC Cass Rickman volunteers to take the gun to the yard for forensic examination, but a robbery leaves her panda unattended for a teenager to steal the gun. Brownlow usurps Meadows as he plans to head up the op, but Mannion comes over from Barton Street to investigate due to it being on his patch, and Mannion reminds Brownlow that he is almost certainly due to beat him to the role of Borough Commander, and that the case is "an opportunity to get the lay of the land". Brownlow is resentful of his involvement and enlists the help of Beech, who suggests sending Rickman undercover as a buyer to get the gun back without Mannion's knowledge. When she blows the cover of Glaze during negotiations with two rival buyers, she impresses seller Leroy Jones, who offers the gun behind the back of the other buyers for a higher fee, only for Rickman to discover she has been double-crossed; has her cover been blown, or is Jones pulling a fast one?
39	"Confessions of a Zookeeper"	Benedick Bates and Bryan Marshall guest star	Tania Diez	Ray Brooking	1 July 1999
Conway leads a charity night in the cells in aid of a young girl with cancer, Sophie Lake. The night is destined to be a disaster from the off as Monroe calls in sick, so Brownlow takes his place, and the cell in which Conway had hidden some creature comforts for the night. Despite orders not to let female prisoners into the cells, a busload arrives after the occupant of an amateur rugby team throws a case of booze at Carver and Hagen's panda, causing them to crash. Events get only worse when an old enemy of Boyden's tells him the celebrity repping the event, local boxer Dion Barrie, is suspected of a deliberate hit and run. When Boyden confronts Barrie, his manager smacks Garfield in the face. While all the drama unfolds, Brownlow bonds with Sophie's father, Paul, who is starting to reconsider the experimental treatment that has only a minute chance of extending Sophie's life, leaving Brownlow torn over what is the right thing to do for the Lake family.
40	"Pillow Talk"	Steve Speirs guest stars	Peter Cregeen	Barry Simner	6 July 1999
Worrell and Harker attend a deliberate hit and run. Quinnan and Garfield are tasked with tracking down the driver, Oliver Beaumann, who has allegedly run over his wife. When they transfer Beaumann to the nick, he passes out in the van. At the hospital, a doctor asks one of them to stay, and while Garfield is happy at the idea of staying with Jenny for the night, Cryer demands that Quinnan stay. Garfield is suspicious as Jenny is distant with him, and she later mentions to Quinnan she's doubtful about what Garfield wants long term. As they are distracted, Beaumann tries to escape, but Quinnan drags him back in. Beaumann then claims the husband of his wife's best friend is having an affair with his wife, and that he is armed with a gun, intent on getting Beaumann out of the way. Quinnan is sceptical, but is quickly drawn into an armed siege.
41	"Heavy Plant Crossing"	Lee Boardman guest stars	Ged Maguire	Wendy Lee	8 July 1999
Boyden's raid on a gang planning to highjack a digger goes pear-shaped when a second gang shows up and shoots two of their rivals, kidnapping one of them. He confronts his informant about not receiving the full information, and when he turns up at the station with more info, Beech hijacks the informant and ends up at odds with Boyden. However, Boyden is delighted to discover all is not as it seems when his informant provides on another raid, letting Beech continue his doomed raid. Meanwhile, Garfield plans to propose to Jenny before she heads off to Colombia on an earthquake clean up crew, but she is delayed when Page and Quinnan are tipped off about a mystery gunshot victim at a private hospital she has been seconded to. She then deliberately continues to delay, as her feelings for Quinnan are making her question her relationship with Garfield, while one of her colleagues encourages Quinnan to act. Will he really betray his oldest friend by going over the side with Jenny?
42	"Good Relations"	Final appearance of AC Trevor Hicks	Laura Sims	Andy Armitage	13 July 1999
The relief is put head to head with an overzealous group of security guards patrolling the Copthorne Estate. Brownlow resents their involvement, but AC Hicks warns him he has no choice but to cooperate. Hollis finally gets his caravan "mobile police office" up and running, despite constant joking from the relief. With the security guards going above their quota, the youths on the estate turn against them, and Hollis receives blowback when he finds a youth trying to torch his caravan. Soaked with petrol, Hollis determines to make the boy see sense. When Hollis discovers the lad has been placed on a special unit at school, he establishes a bond by admitting he was once placed in a "sin bin". As the pair talk, Hollis implores him to give evidence against the gang of youths who ordered him to torch the caravan, and in particular, local villain Danny McCormack. Can Hollis secure a major result to show up his sneering colleagues?
43	"Big Fish"	Zienia Merton guest stars	Albert Barber	Len Collin	15 July 1999
Skase is sceptical when an informant tells him a small-time dealer is in cahoots with a South American dealer. However, when his informant mentions a major contact, Skase gets his hopes up and pushes Deakin to conduct a raid. When the raid goes down, Skase is concerned when the cash briefcase is a dud, but he uncovers multiple kilograms of cocaine in the seller's briefcase. Skase and Deakin are paraded as heroes in the wake of the raid, but their glory is about to be taken from them by the National Crime Squad after they identify the seller as Ben Carter, who is wanted in several countries around the world. Events take a sinister turn when Skase's informant turns up dead, and things get only worse when it appears the two NCS officers who took Carter to their station for questioning were actually impostors. With Deakin's rep in particular taking a major blow and the real NCS officers keen to make someone pay, the team is left scrambling to find their target and save the DI's career.
44	"Cowardice"	First appearance of PC Dale Smith, departure of PC Luke Ashton; Nikki Amuka-Bird, Philip Martin Brown and Roger Daltrey guest star	Gwennan Sage and Justin Hardy	Maxwell Young	20 July 1999
45	"Cowardice"	First appearance of PC Dale Smith, departure of PC Luke Ashton; Nikki Amuka-Bird, Philip Martin Brown and Roger Daltrey guest star	Gwennan Sage and Justin Hardy	Maxwell Young	22 July 1999
Taxed: New PC Dale "Smithy" Smith arrives at Sun Hill for his first day, pairing with Ashton. They are left chasing two youths attacking a black man, but Ashton cracks up when confronted by an armed suspect, and Smithy suspects Ashton is a coward. Back at the station, they suspect the assault was a usual case of tit for tat racial prejudice, until Cryer identifies the victim as Mark West, the husband of a prosecution witness due to testify against a local thug, Rob Cord. When Ashton and Smithy attend an incident at the Cord home, his wife is arrested for threatening Doreen West. She later decides to drop her witness statement, but a comment made by Cord's wife brings Cryer back to an earlier incident. However, the case escalates when Mark West says Doreen has been abducted, and that Cord is working on behalf of a corrupt council official. Uniform launches a raid to locate the Doreen West, but Smithy ends up ambushed chasing the suspects, with Ashton nowhere to be seen. Cracked Up: Ashton reels after being accused of cowardice by new boy Smithy. The team attends a group counselling session over Smithy's attack, but tensions only rise further between the uniform officers. After Ashton leaves the meeting, Rickman speaks up for him, but Ashton is convinced his colleagues have turned against him. Paired with Quinnan, Ashton investigates claims by a reformed dealer, Larry Moore, that a bag of drugs has been planted at his home. When a local youth accuses Moore of dealing again, Beech arrests him and comes down hard, but his methods leave Moore unhinged. After discovering his wife was responsible for the drugs, he abducts his young daughter. When Moore feels he has been backed into a corner, he snaps and takes horrific action, with a shell-shocked Ashton questioning his capability for the job in the wake of the day's shocking events.
46	"Wedded Bliss"	June Page, Gabrielle Reidy, Velibor Topić and Bill Thomas guest star	Neil Adams	Chris Jury	27 July 1999
Rickman and Smith are at loggerheads after being paired together, with Rickman feeling Smith played a part in Ashton's resignation. However, after attending a scam wedding at a register office, they are united in their anger at CID after Holmes and Proctor mock them as they hand the case over to them. They then shift their focus to an irate man who has received a false speeding ticket. When both the address for the wedding scammer and the parking tickets match, they find a third-party receiver for the mail in the scams. Smith and Rickman set up a sting, but lose the teenage suspect after she assaults Smithy during a pursuit. They are then drafted onto the wedding scams, and immigration is brought on board after identifying prime suspect Ion Goga, a Romanian national wanted for a series of crimes across Europe. As Smith escorts the fake bride in the wedding scam back to the station, he makes a breakthrough in the parking ticket scam.
47	"Lucky Jim"	Silas Carson guest stars	Richard Holthouse	Nick Crittenden	29 July 1999
Worrell and Garfield fail to catch a stolen 4x4 in pursuit, the latest in a long line of such vehicles being stolen, but luckily the vehicle is abandoned for them to analyse. Meanwhile, Carver and Harker intervene at a domestic where a man is being refused access to his daughter by his ex-wife. After talking to Carver, the woman invites him to a drink with her father, local car dealer Gerry Metcalfe. Carver meets Metcalfe's associate Samantha as they have a drink, and after having a meal, they go back to a hotel. The following morning, he discovers that Metcalfe's daughter has reported that her ex-husband has abducted their child because Carver failed to arrange a meeting between the warring parents. Worse still, he discovers a £500 deposit in his account from Metcalfe, and that his associate Samantha is an escort who has skimmed Carver's cards. Using a rival car dealer for leverage, Carver sets out to nail Metcalfe without his "bribe" being exposed.
48	"Screwdriver"	Kris Marshall and Neil Maskell guest star	Barbara Rennie	Sheila Duncan	3 August 1999
Holmes and Proctor investigate the rape of a woman inside a mental health facility. After discovering a separate attack occurred at another facility six months earlier, DS Acton from Park Rise Station is seconded to Sun Hill to help investigate both cases. A staff member from the other facility claims Acton had a relationship with a nurse, Ken Forbes, who moved from the facility where the first attack occurred to the second. After Forbes uncovers a condom in the victim's room, Proctor is infuriated that he has corrupted the evidence. As Forbes is implicated by a security guard who spotted his car at the time of the attack, Proctor and Acton arrest him, and a besotted Proctor ignores Forbes protesting that Acton planted a screwdriver with paint at the scene. As the guard reveals he saw Acton at the scene scraping something off a window, Proctor realises the plant allegations may be true. Forensics match tape found on Forbes and in the victim's room, but Proctor goes to an allotment owned by Forbes and finds the real screwdriver, but Acton throws it in a nearby river to maintain her credibility. Knowing she has now gone too far, Proctor feels he should call in CIB, but he does not want to be labelled as a whistle-blower.
49	"Inside Out"	Philip Wright and Ken Hutchison guest star	N. G. Bristow	Steve Handley	5 August 1999
Beech and Glaze are sent to Shadwell Prison to investigate allegations that three prison officers are responsible for the assaults of two prisoners. With the prison on lockdown, they try to get through to the angry victims, but they soon face outrage from the prison officers when one of the suspended officers is burgled and another is assaulted. Glaze tries to talk to a lifer but ends up being held hostage; however, he provides info after the incident about a death in custody five years earlier. One of the victims is identified as a family member of the prisoner who died five years ago, and his brother is suspected to be the man behind the burglary and assault, but they are forced to turn to one of the accused for evidence. Will he turn on his colleagues to help them solve the case?
50	"Critical Mass"	Nicholas Day guest stars	Laurence Moody	Chris Ould	10 August 1999
A rainy night looks like being a long shift for the officers out on the beat, with ongoing construction on the station causing a power outage in half of the custody. However, it pales in significance to the chaos that lies ahead; McCann is sceptical about a caller saying there is a bomb inside Sun Hill, but as soon as Ackland and Stamp interview the caller, they realise it is something to worry about. As the bomb squad is called in and the station is evacuated, Meadows waits for their prime suspect, Ben Wallace, one of the decorators working on the station, who has a history of mental health issues and a grudge against the police. Stamp and Holmes interview his parents, and they realise a recent frosty encounter with their estranged son may have tipped him over the edge. While the bomb squad dismantles the device, the technician reveals there may be another device, but where?
51	"Ring-a-Ring O'Roses"	90-minute special; James Thornton guest stars	Pip Broughton	Tom Needham	12 August 1999
While investigating a series of threatening phone calls, Ackland and Rickman find their suspect assaulted with "Join the Club" written on their back in marker pen, matching a series of assaults on prostitutes who have had the same message written on their backs. When Ackland, Rickman, Quinnan, and Worrell stop a woman committing suicide on a train track, they discover she is the latest victim, and that the message alludes to a man who is infecting the prostitutes with HIV. The local working girls are asked to be on the lookout for a man matching the suspect's description, and after catching them inflicting vigilante action on the suspect, they arrest him. The man is identified as Andy Marshall, and Rawton is horrified to recognise him in custody, and she admits to Ackland that he is her ex-boyfriend. Ackland is forced to admit what Marshall has been arrested for, and she implores Rawton to get tested, but Rawton is more focused on getting onto the case.
52	"The Only Way Is Up"	Simon Kunz guest stars	Brian Farnham	Candy Denman	17 August 1999
Meadows is approached by DCI Calder of Barton Street, who was a DC of Meadows at AMIP. Calder admits that while he is on the verge of promotion to Superintendent, an armed robbery that went wrong has left him under the kosh. With a suspect vanishing right before the job, Calder claims CIB are investigating a theory that one of the Barton Street CID team tipped the gang off, but Meadows is sceptical and leaves Calder to it. Coincidentally, Calder's elusive suspect is found as the victim of a beating attended by Garfield and Stamp, with a member of the public attempting to help savagely assaulted as a result. Beech identifies one of the men fleeing the scene as DC Bonford of Barton Street, proving they have found their inside man. However, the discovery may come too late as Calder is found atop of a high-rise tower block intent on committing suicide. Can Meadows and Conway talk him down?
53	"Rock Bottom"	Joe Swash guest stars	Dominic Lees	Chris McWatters	24 August 1999
Harker is disappointed when he fails to save the life of an overdosing man, so when Conway offers him the role of Youth Diversions Officer, he takes it. Meanwhile, Boyden is tasked with giving a view of custody to new drugs referral worker Dexter King, a reformed addict with a history with the Sun Hill team. Daly is fuming to discover King is working in the area, no less with Harker as part of the Youth Diversions scheme, and his vendetta against King leads him to raid King's flat while Harker is there. Brownlow is left furious as a result, and despite Meadows warning Daly off the case, he jumps back into it after a local addict is assaulted by major dealer Barry Lomas. King gives info on where Lomas keeps his drugs, but he turns the tables on King, and Daly jumps at the chance to arrest him again. However, Daly is then left to eat humble pie with King once more when the assault victim dies, in order to nail Lomas for murder.
54	"Sun Hill Boulevard"	Daniel Ainsleigh, Kevin Bishop and Keeley Forsyth guest star	Chris Lovett	Stephen Plaice	31 August 1999
Harker and Stamp are first on scene when a body is found floating in the local lido. While guarding the cordon, a woman approaches Hollis and lodges a complaint about a man taking photos of the patrons of the lido. Monroe tasks Harker with working undercover, giving him a day in the pool, and he is surprised to see Rickman there after she calls in sick. To keep him sweet, Rickman helps Harker with his case, and they soon identify their Peeping Tom. However, events take a drastic turn for Rickman when the lockers are raided and her warrant card is stolen. After spotting the deceased girl in photos taken by the peeping tom, including with the thief, Harker is sent back to the lido to investigate a group of partying youths to investigate their links to both the death and thefts. After hours, Harker and Rickman team up again and go undercover in an attempt to ensnare the gang.
55	"Lola"	Shirley Stelfox, Raquel Cassidy and Chris Simmons guest star	Ian White	Terry Hodgkinson	1 September 1999
Deakin prepares a raid alongside the DSS fraud investigators. Page is disappointed to be left out in order to issue a court summons, but it proves to be no great loss as the raids all go wrong and two wrong households are raided as a result. Feeling she has been given yet another boring case when she is tasked with assisting an RSPCA officer with rescuing a dog trapped in an abandoned house's cellar. However, she is stunned when it appears the noise was made by a woman locked inside the cellar. She is identified as a Venezuelan illegal immigrant, Lola Chavez, who has been abducted by the house owner, Ricky Lee. Lee denies all the allegations and claims Lola's claims are all bogus, and it appears there could be something to it when Lola runs away from her safehouse. However, as Holmes tries to get her to accept what's going on, Page can't escape the suspicion that Lee is guilty of what Lola alleged. Notes: Chris Simmons would joins the cast as DC Mickey Webb in 2000.
56	"Integrity"	First appearance of PC Nick Klein; Joseph Kpobie guest stars	Jim Shields and Robert Del Maestro	Elizabeth-Anne Wheal	16 September 1999
57	"Integrity"	First appearance of PC Nick Klein; Joseph Kpobie guest stars	Jim Shields and Robert Del Maestro	Elizabeth-Anne Wheal	19 September 1999
Part One: Brownlow tasks uniform with escorting a local musician, Anil Indrani, who has been subject to racial discrimination, in a joint operation with Barton Street's DS Vickers. When his vehicle is ambushed, McCann is put at odds with new PC Nick Klein, whose girlfriend was on board the vehicle when it was ambushed. Klein's first shift at Sun Hill sees him paired with Smith, who is subject to an integrity test while out on patrol. He is furious about it and opens up to his friend Vickers, who raids Indrani's club as a way of getting back at Brownlow. Klein spots Vickers planting drugs on one of Indrani's men, so he asks Brownlow to help him expose Vickers, along with McCann. Part Two: With DS Vickers blackmailing him over his use of cannabis, Klein is more determined than ever to bring the corrupt officer down. Brownlow asks Worrell to join the case, but she accuses him of going after her skin colour, rather than her ability to do the job, and turns it down; instead, the role goes to Rickman. She is tasked with going undercover as Sally Holland, with her cover being an ex-girlfriend of Anil Indrani, in order to lure Vickers into planting drugs on Indrani. Vickers calls on Smith to help him with an unauthorised OBBO, and when he recognises Rickman, he blows her cover. Klein confronts Vickers as a last resort, but he is devastated to discover that Vickers has arranged for Area Drugs to bust Indrani, and he is arrested along with Klein's girlfriend Pam. Klein is furious to discover that it was Smith who blew their undercover op, and presents him with all the evidence he has on Vickers in an attempt to open his eyes to what his friend is really like, while he makes a last ditch act to save Pam, but he knows it will cost him his career as a result.
58	"Cold Calling"	Charles De'Ath, Charlie Brooks, Steve Toussaint and Ian Burfield guest star	N. G. Bristow	Carolyn Sally Jones	21 September 1999
Rawton is furious when Meadows pulls her OBBO on convicted rapist David Trigg, due to budgetary reasons. She is quickly put on a series of robberies, then onto the case of a missing teenager. She is determined to prove that Trigg could be involved due to the proximity of his home to the missing girl. However, Trigg comes forward as a witness and gives a description of a man that the missing girl's friend identifies as Paul Myers, who is brought in due to a suspicious bruise on his knuckles. The girl is later found as the victim of a serious assault, but Trigg's relationship with a local suddenly returns him to the top of the list of suspects, but the biggest shock is that he has abducted a woman he wrote to while in prison. As the ramifications of Trigg's actions come to light in the fallout, Rawton clashes with Meadows about financial planning taking priority over people's safety.
59	"Millennium"	First appearance of DS Claire Stanton	Brian Parker	Steve Griffiths	23 September 1999
New DS Claire Stanton joins CID and investigate a case of eco-terrorism with Proctor and Lennox, when a local supermarket reports a batch of oranges have been injected with mercury, with a threatening letter claiming if the shop does not take genetically modified products off their shelves they will use strychnine instead. Proctor identifies a local market seller, but while their opinions on the matter are strong, they admit they were stealing the fruit not poisoning it. Proctor then follows a lead from a CCTV trail after a second attack, but when he uncovers an unlikely suspect, he is subject to an attack and taken hostage. Meanwhile, Page and Stamp arrest a man fighting with a travel agent, who claims his deal was cancelled then sold on at a higher rate. However, they soon discover his anger was triggered by domestic troubles, and CID are later called to a serious incident at the man's home after he is bailed.
60	"The Three Sergeants"	Haluk Bilginer, Jennifer Calvert and Julia Deakin guest star	Rob Bailey	Rod Lewis	28 September 1999
Boyden endures a nightmare during a busy night in custody; Garfield is called away for a prisoner's medication and pizza for another who is refusing to stop banging on his cell door, Ackland brings in a drunk who keeps passing out, duty officer Cryer demands he take in two people due for deportation and Hollis doesn't warn him about a lay visitor, who discovers that Ackland's drunk has died. The sergeants are all under fire as a result, as CIB swoop in to investigate. The sergeants end up at odds, none more so than Boyden, who feels he has the most to lose as the prisoner died in his custody. Ackland investigates the dead man's past, but has to risk her career in order to save by interviewing a prisoner on bail to identify the man.
61	"Trade-Off"	Renu Setna and Joanna Scanlan guest star	Steve Shill	Peter Lloyd	30 September 1999
Beech arranges a sting on an arms dealer. Meanwhile, Glaze and Lennox investigate the stabbing of a recently released con, Martin Tudor. Suspicion turns to the family of a man Tudor killed driving drunk, furious about Tudor serving only four months of a nine-month sentence. However, suspicion then turns to a local pub bouncer, Jason Danziger, after he is found with a knife while assaulting a punter, then Glaze when he tries to intervene. Beech is horrified when he identifies Danziger as his informant for the arms deal. As a way of apology and thanks to Glaze for letting him off the knife charge with a caution, Danziger offers to put Glaze undercover as a hitman for Tudor's long-suffering wife. However, when she backs out of the deal, Glaze ends at odds with Beech by accusing him of creating a false operation to get Danziger off his charge. When Tudor is found dead, Glaze ends up trying to convince Beech to drop his case and arrest Danziger for murder.
62	"Treading Water"	Suzanne Packer guest stars	Susan Tully	David Hoskins	5 October 1999
Deakin is furious when Carver and Rickman blow an OBBO to arrest a major dealer. Furious at constant put-downs by his former CID colleagues, Carver decides enough is enough and accepts an offer from an old friend to manage security at his nightclub. In the meantime, Deakin demands that Carver track a former informant linked to their target, and after being arrested in possession of heroin by Rickman, tells her about an armed robbery. However, Deakin is further infuriated when the robbery goes down at the wrong bank, so Rickman and Carver arrest their informant once again in possession of heroin. Offering him rehab so he can reunite with his wife, Carver makes a breakthrough, but he gets a personal blow when he misses out on the security manager job. Slipping into a depression, Carver turns to drink to deal with his problems.
63	"Look Again"	Annette Badland and Nigel Planer guest star	Carol Wiseman	Scott Cherry	7 October 1999
Hollis turns up late to shift, and a furious Boyden assigns him to an eviction notice and traffic duty. Hollis and Page arrest the man being evicted, and as she takes the man into custody, Hollis is asked by a bailiff to look into a stolen passport found in the house. Visiting the owner, Boyden pulls Hollis off the case to take him onto traffic duty, but they are quickly called back to the home of the man who had his passport stolen, and find him the victim of a serious assault. Hollis was shocked to later discover Boyden received a complaint from the victim and did not follow up on it, and the victim's cousin files an official complaint with Conway. When the suspect goes to St. Hugh's for revenge, the victim runs away, and events take a tragic turn.
64	"Love and War"	Final regular appearance of George Garfield as PC; Ryan Gage guest star	Ian White	Neil Clarke	12 October 1999
65	"Love and War"	Final regular appearance of George Garfield as PC; Ryan Gage guest star	Ian White	Neil Clarke	14 October 1999
Part One: Garfield is determined to see Jenny upon her return from Colombia, unaware Quinnan is also desperate to see her. They are paired alongside Rickman, Klein, and Hollis to catch a disqualified driver seen driving his car. During their OBBO, Rickman clashes with Quinnan as he rushes off to try to find a phone box to call Jenny from. Once their target is in custody, Quinnan and Garfield attend a shoplifting call. Quinnan deviously goes to Klein and offers him overtime to stay on the case with Garfield, who is furious to discover Quinnan has sneaked off. Meanwhile, CID has an OBBO of their own at St. Hugh's to catch a wanted murder suspect whose terminally ill father is in the hospital. Proctor and Lennox spy Quinnan visiting Jenny, but when Garfield shows up, they have to act fast to avoid him. Jenny decides to end her relationship with Garfield, and arranges a meeting, unaware he has managed to get out of work early to go and see her. Part Two: Garfield is left furious when he spots Quinnan and Jenny in a passionate clinch outside St. Hugh's. After hearing Quinnan return to the section house, Garfield confronts him in front of the rest of the relief, where Quinnan admits his betrayal. After trying to attack his now former best friend, Garfield goes on a bender and ends up at Jenny's, where he attacks a member of the night relief trying to intervene. While his colleague agrees not to press charges, the relief is divided the following morning as news of Quinnan's betrayal spreads, while management are concerned whether the pair can work together again. When most of uniform are seconded to CID's OBBO at St. Hugh's, Quinnan ends up in the van with Garfield and the pair come to blows in front of a furious Monroe. As Monroe blasts the pair, Quinnan asks for a transfer, while Garfield begins to question what is left for him at Sun Hill.
66	"Hot Money"	Ian Reddington, Sean Gilder and Trevor Laird guest star	Bruce MacDonald	Don Webb	19 October 1999
Hollis and Hagen are laughed off by CID when they provide a tipoff on an upcoming armed robbery at a casino, provided by former getaway driver Jerry Mulligan, after he is arrested for stealing a milk float. However, it comes back to haunt them when a casino is robbed overnight, with Hollis wasting no time in mentioning CID's indiscretion to a furious Burnside. He tasks Lennox and McCann, on attachment to CID, with tracking Mulligan down. He provides info on another raid, so Burnside leads an undercover team there to catch the gang in the act, but Mulligan is attacked and the gang makes a breakaway, leaving Burnside to pick up the pieces.
67	"Crash Landing"	Sally Dexter, Arthur White and Pip Torrens guest star	Jo Shoop	Nicholas McInerny	21 October 1999
Daly makes a daring rescue as he and Holmes witness a light aircraft crash outside a local stadium. He identifies the passenger as ex-DS Janet Campion, his boss at Child Protection seven years earlier. Coming in the following morning, Daly is shocked to discover Campion is under investigation by OCG. Daly's link to both Campion and his investigation into a local villain leads him to be brought onto the case, and he goes to dig deeper when she invites him to dinner. He goes above and beyond to save her when she is implicated in a scam, offering her a deal to sell out her boyfriend to OCG.
68	"Father's Day"	Jon Morrison guest stars	Paul Murton	Barry Simner	28 October 1999
Boyden is surprised when his estranged daughter Amy shows up at the station, offering third-hand info that her boyfriend, Phillip Cooper, witnessed two drug dealers killing a man. While there are no reports and he demands Amy leaves, he later discovers the story is true. After Amy is arrested for shoplifting, Boyden discovers she has recently had a baby, his granddaughter Sophie. Boyden then confronts Cooper, dragging him down to Sun Hill to make a statement. Beech and Glaze arrange a safehouse as AMIP continues their investigation, but Cooper sneaks out overnight to buy drugs. Unaware he has blown the security of the safehouse, Sophie is abducted as Amy has a walk with her father, leaving Boyden determined to find the murder suspects and rescue Sophie, but he struggles to impress on Amy that she needs to get away from Cooper for her own good.
69	"Sweet Sixteen"	Lara Cazalet, Kate Magowan and Adam Astill guest star	Christopher Hodson	Marc Pye	2 November 1999
Deakin mounts an OBBO to catch a girl gang who have been robbing punters in nightclubs and casinos. Sending Skase undercover to pick up one of the girls, he finds himself ambushed and humiliated, but Deakin is furious about his decision to go to the girl's car instead of his own, where the OBBO team was situated. The following morning, Skase and Lennox get another case in which a car dealer was robbed of his car and a quantity of cash at a local casino. Meanwhile, Boulton is left heading up a drugs investigation when Proctor has to conduct CPR during the raid, and another girl comes in reporting her sister had fatally overdosed, with both users told the drugs are called "flat-liners". Elsewhere, Harker and Rickman attend a disturbance where two local girls have vandalised the house of a neighbourhood watch coordinator, whose camera has recorded an apparent drug deal. As the dots connect, it appears all three cases are down to the same girl gang.
70	"Denial"	Paul Angelis and Angela Bruce guest star	Albert Barber	Gregory Evans	4 November 1999
Carver's decline into alcoholism continues, but he gets a boost when he receives a job offer from an ex-DS in a private investigation firm. However, his working career is yet again in the gutter as his investigation into an armed robbery at a petrol station goes nowhere, while he is reprimanded by Ackland for disappearing from a sting at a local school as a young boy becomes the latest victim of a series of robberies. Things get only worse when he is tasked with investigating an alleged fraudster as a test for the PI job, discovering she is actually his contact's ex-wife, and he is trying to break an injunction to track her down. As his career goes up in smoke and the hopes of getting out of Sun Hill fade, he ends up lashing out as uniform continues to mock him about his alcoholism.
71	"Walking the Line"	George Harris guest stars	Laurence Moody	Julian Spilsbury	9 November 1999
Page and Smith attend the vicious attack of a Polish shopkeeper. Lennox and Proctor spearhead a raid on a local pub frequented by known villain Davy Rawlings, and events only escalate when the victim has a heart attack and ends up on the critical list. However, Rawlings ends up lodging a complaint against Lennox for racial abuse during the arrest, with no witnesses able to back him up. One of the suspects, Errol Price, denies any link to Rawlings, but his father confirms they are aware of one another. Knowing Brownlow is determined to weed out racism within the department, Lennox fears he will be made a scapegoat to avoid press allegations. Risking a career he feels he might lose anyway, Lennox goes against PACE by consulting Price, and his father, while he is on bail in a bid to save himself.
72	"Cover Stories"	Ben Miles guest stars	Don Leaver	Elizabeth-Anne Wheal	16 November 1999
Burnside recruits a team of Sun Hill officers as he goes undercover with Stanton, posing as his wife, to track down a group of property scammers. Carver is assigned to the team, but shows up late and is immediately reprimanded when Ackland reports the night shift found a bottle of whisky under the passenger seat of the Area Car after his shift. Burnside is furious when he works out Carver has become an alcoholic, and tries to make his old friend face his problem, but he gets another shock when his prime suspect's partner in crime is a face from his past, and when Ackland discovers this she suspects Burnside's personal motives may jeopardise the case.
73	"Security"	Ross Boatman and Trevor Byfield guest star	Justin Chadwick	Dale Overton	18 November 1999
Stamp and Page attend a break at the home of Barton Street PC Steve Bennett, who returns after a night out with Quinnan to find his daughter's bedroom has been vandalised. He enlists the help of Stanton to investigate what Bennett's wife claims has been an ongoing campaign of harassment. Bennett points Quinnan in the direction of an ex-lover, but it proves to be a non-starter. Attention then turns to local villain Dougie Davis, who has a history of a similar campaign of harassment against another Barton Street PC; however, he is incarcerated. Attention then turns to an unlikely source, but events take a dramatic turn when Bennett is injured in a hit-and-run. Meanwhile, Jenny has a frosty encounter with uniform at Stamp's birthday party, dampening her relationship with Quinnan.
74	"Up in Smoke"	Sean Blowers guest stars	Baz Taylor	Simon Sharkey	23 November 1999
75	"Up in Smoke"	Sean Blowers guest stars	Baz Taylor	Simon Sharkey	25 November 1999
Part One: A highly hungover Carver is late to court, with he and Skase due to testify against a sexual assault suspect. However, he forgets his evidence and the case is thrown out in front of a furious Meadows and Ackland. Meanwhile, Quinnan and Stamp are assigned to a high-security convoy to transport seized drugs to an incinerator in Kent. With Quinnan called away on the second day, Monroe assigns Carver in the hopes he will stay out of trouble and off the beat. However, after drunkenly bonding with a porter at the Met factory, he goes out on the convoy highly hungover. With his drinking getting worse and worse, he gets a reality check when disaster strikes. Part Two: DCI Scanlon from Kent Constabulary arrives to investigate the attack on the Home Office convoy. Carver reels from the fact that he may have leaked the location of the convoy to factory porter Vernon Liggett. As his alcoholism becomes apparent, Carver is read the riot act by both Meadows and Monroe. When he shows up at the station drunk, Hagen and Hollis do their utmost to hide him from management. Meanwhile, Lennox investigates Liggett's involvement, but he later turns up dead. However, they get a lead, which sees Lennox go undercover as a cabbie to ensnare the ambush squad.
76	"Homework"	—	Bob Blagden	Carolyn Sally Jones	30 November 1999
On a romantic night with her new boyfriend Steve, Ackland's neighbour interrupts after revealing she has found a gun in her tenant's room. Beech is determined to set up an OBBO at her flat, but Deakin warns him off. Ackland is determined to avoid it, not just because of her past, but because she wants another night in with Steve. However, when no suitable OP is found, Ackland reluctantly agrees to let Beech and Lennox have the OBBO in her flat. The situation gets compromised when Ackland clashes with her neighbour after finding a spliff in her house, but they get back on track and arrest their suspect. When he is alibied, Beech and Lennox realise they've been looking at the wrong person.
77	"Knowing You"	—	Rob Evans	Steve Handley	2 December 1999
Daly leads a raid on the home of a violent pimp who has been recruiting teenage girls. However, the prime suspect vanishes after attacking Proctor during the raid, with Holmes distracted by a car driven by Rita Davis, a prison inmate she met when she went undercover at a women's jail (in the episode "Follow Through"), almost hits her. Davis tracks Holmes and asks for help; the pimp has been trying to recruit her 14-year-old daughter, but the info she provides for two potential leads go nowhere. Events take a sinister turn when one of the girls rescued from the brothel is subjected to an acid attack, while Daly's informant turns up dead. When Davis and her pimp report that their suspect has abducted Davis' daughter, Holmes gets personally involved; however, Proctor threatens to undermine her efforts.
78	"Rock Bottom"	Sheila Reid, Stephen Graham, Eamon Boland and Steven Wickham guest star	Gwennan Sage and Chris Lovett	Len Collin	7 December 1999
79	"Rock Bottom"	Sheila Reid, Stephen Graham, Eamon Boland and Steven Wickham guest star	Gwennan Sage and Chris Lovett	Len Collin	9 December 1999
Consumers: Carver is assaulted and mugged before his shift, and as he wanders the streets dazed and confused, he befriends a group of homeless drunks. When they point Carver in the direction of a local pub that sells out of hours, Carver bribes his way in to get free drinks. At the pub, he begins talking to a petty thief, who, after robbing a local off-licence for booze, takes him back to his home to meet his wife. Realising the man prostitutes his wife, she discovers Carver is a copper, but rather than tell her husband, they bond and she tells Carver he needs to get his life sorted out before it's too late. However, as he tries to come to terms with his problem, he gets a horrendous shock that threatens to sidetrack any hopes of getting his life back on track. Lock In: Carver is mortified as he wakes up in bed next to the dead body of the woman he befriended the day before. He decides to flee as he fears he has committed murder, and as Hagen and Hollis try to retrace Carver's steps as they fear for his safety, they come across the woman's body. The search for Carver over his safety turns into a manhunt so he can be questioned as a murder suspect, with Burnside seconded from Crime OCU, with AMIP short-staffed. Carver is found at a local homeless shelter and arrested on suspicion of murder, and things get only worse when the victim's husband is also found dead in Carver's stolen suit. Burnside is determined to save his former protégé from spending the rest of his life in jail, but can Carver clear his name, and will he finally get help for his alcoholism?
80	"Money For Nothing"	Noel Fitzpatrick, Stephen Churchett and Eric Mason guest star	Steve Shill	Chris Jury	14 December 1999
Boyden leads a dog racing syndicate with Klein, Stamp, Rickman, and Quinnan. He is keen to keep it secret from fiancée Jenny; however, she ends up finding out and joins in to help boost the wedding fund. Things get only worse when he falls victim to an ATM scam that drains his account, leaving Boulton liaising with OCG to track down the gang of scammers responsible. The first race fails, but they soon uncover an elaborate scam that gets them a windfall on the second race. However, it's inevitable that they'll be found out, leaving them in hot water with Brownlow. When they track down the ATM scammers off duty, they jump at the chance to earn some brownie points.
81	"The Big Day"	Guest appearance of ex-PCs Steve Loxton and George Garfield, and temporary departure of PC Jim Carver; Jessie Wallace, Gary Beadle and Tam Dean Burn guest star	Rob Bailey and Jo Johnson	Richard Stoneman	15 December 1999
82	"The Big Day"	Guest appearance of ex-PCs Steve Loxton and George Garfield, and temporary departure of PC Jim Carver; Jessie Wallace, Gary Beadle and Tam Dean Burn guest star	Rob Bailey and Jo Johnson	Richard Stoneman	16 December 1999
A Night to Forget: Quinnan prepares for his wedding, but the event looks set to be a disaster early on when the van carrying his wedding cake crashes and the masterpiece is ruined. Hollis arranges a pub crawl for the men, while Jenny prepares for her hen party at a strip club, although Page is unhappy to be attending. As Monroe is held back with the night shift Inspector delayed, he tries to help a man with amnesia retrace his steps, but Proctor identifies him as a suspect for armed robbery. Quinnan has a guest of honour at his party when former Sun Hill PC Steve Loxton shows up, while Carver attends as he continues his rehab, but the presence of his sponsor leads to a confrontation with Stamp, who arrested the man several years earlier. Loxton ends up supporting Carver, but when his car is broken into and is flagged by a CAD check from a night duty PC, Carver tries to get him to open up. Meanwhile, Page has a crime of her own to deal with when a woman at the strip club accuses one of the performers of groping her, so Hagen goes undercover to teach him a lesson he won't forget. A Day to Remember: Quinnan's wedding day with Jenny arrives, but the affair does not look like being straightforward, while he dwells on Page's confession the night before. Lennox furiously confronts Hollis for borrowing the CID camcorder for the event after discovering he has recorded over a CID OBBO, much to the dismay of Meadows. Another error by Hollis sees the wedding group unable to arrange enough transport to reach the reception, and Quinnan is infuriated further when poor organisation by Hollis leaves the reception with no food and minimal drinks. The ceremony ends up with further disasters as Page has to talk down a suicidal woman, Loxton and a group of partygoers end up missing on the way, Carver jumps to the rescue of a partygoer who falls off the reception boat and Quinnan's best friend and Delaney's ex Garfield makes a surprise appearance.
83	"Judgement Day"	Final regular appearance of DC Liz Rawton; Stephen Yardley and Fine Time Fontayne guest star	Michael Owen Morris	Patrick Melanaphy	21 December 1999
Rawton is horrified when she receives a threatening letter that matches the MO of a villain she jailed in her SO10 days. In the interim, she investigates a series of lorry hijacks, but a raid proves to be unsuccessful. She spends the night at Lennox's for her own safety, but the following morning, she is abducted by her prime suspect for the hijacks, Joseph Anderson. Due to Rawton being secretive about the man who may have sent the package, Meadows is forced to call in Rawton's former DS from SO10 to get info on their man. Identifying him as Brian Hill, the team discovers he has been recently released from jail and was working with Anderson to exact revenge against Rawton, and the Sun Hill team are left fearful when they realise just how much danger Rawton is in.
84	"Haunted"	Hannah Yelland, James Cosmo and Andrew Scarborough guest star	Chris Lovett	Tony Mulholland	23 December 1999
Proctor, Stanton, and Lennox are assigned to a surveillance op at an abandoned warehouse, but Proctor is reluctant as legend states the building is haunted. Lennox and Stanton are more than happy to poke fun, but they still discuss how relevant they think ghosts are. Proctor tells a story of an experience he had while in uniform, when he was on guard duty at a convicted murderer's home where it was believed he had buried as many as four bodies. Stanton counters their claims with a story about a series of burglaries to prove that men will believe more if a woman is involved. To wrap up the flashbacks, Lennox tells the story of when he interviewed a dying convict while still stationed in Glasgow, whose girlfriend mysteriously died at the same time as him.
85	"When the Snow Lay Round About"	Brian Murphy guest stars	Albert Barber	Chris Ould	24 December 1999
Christmas Eve sees Canley caked in snow, so the night shift is grounded unless a call comes in. Hollis and Page arrange a whip-round to fund a Christmas tree, but Hollis has to go back out when he forgets the lights and star. While he's out, he chases a snowball bandit who is setting off shop alarms. Meanwhile, Boyden is tasked with looking after a young boy who has run away from his foster home. McCann takes him to the rec room to help with the tree, but when McCann falsely accuses him of stealing a necklace he got for his girlfriend, the boy storms off. As Stamp deals with a drunk in another cell claiming to be one of Santa's elves, Boyden bonds with the boy, whose foster parents have decided they don't want to deal with him anymore. Elsewhere, Monroe and Ackland try to make sense of a Russian barbershop quintet who claim one of their members has stolen their van in revenge.
86	"Blowing It All Away"	JJ Feild guest stars	Susan Tully	Candy Denman	30 December 1999
Boulton is livid when he is asked to steer clear of a known drugs supplier, and is further infuriated when he is asked to avoid a dealer that the man supplies whom Boulton also has under surveillance. However, he goes ahead with a morning raid, unaware that the dealer was partying with Rickman the night before. After seeing her in custody, he tries to shift the blame onto her, and CIB are called in. Boulton is furious, but tries to think clearly and help Rickman track down the dealer's partner in crime, a young man called Jamie who took a shine to Rickman the night before. Proctor identifies him as Jamie Wells, a man who fled the scene of the raid. As Beech tries going off on his own back to clear Rickman's name, Boulton tries to track Wells and nail his target.
87	"All Change"	William Beck and Pippa Hinchley guest star	Michael Cocker	Mark Holloway	31 December 1999
New Year's Eve; with the dawn of the millennium ahead for the night shift, Brownlow decides the entire CID team should get into uniform and assist on the beat. Meadows, in particular, is peeved, especially because Brownlow is not sticking around to join the troops on patrol, so he and Conway end up on an elusive trail of a midnight drink, but it ends up being a series of mishaps. Boulton ignores orders to try to nail a long-term target, while Lennox and Stamp bet over who can make the first arrest, but Boyden wants custody empty until after midnight as he has a visitor. Meanwhile, Quinnan returns from his honeymoon and is awkwardly paired with Page, and they end up trapped in a lift when an irate neighbour starts a fire in his tower block.
