= 27 Missing Kisses =

2000 Georgian film

- 27 Missing Kisses DVD cover
- Directed by: Nana Jorjadze
- Written by: Nana Jorjadze; Irakli Kvirikadze
- Produced by: Oliver Damian, Jens Meurer, Egoli Films
- Starring: Nutsa Kukhianidze; Yevgeni Sidikhin; Shalva Iashvili; Pierre Richard; Amaliya Mordvinova
- Cinematography: Phedon Papamichael Jr.
- Edited by: Vessela Martschewski
- Music by: Goran Bregović
- Release dates: 11 May 2000 (Cannes Film Festival); 15 January 2001 (Palm Springs International Film Festival)
- Running time: 98 minutes
- Countries: Germany, Georgia, United Kingdom, France
- Languages: Georgian, Russian, French, English
- Budget: DEM 4,300,000 (approx. € 2,200,000)

27 Missing Kisses (Georgian: 27 დაკარგული კოცნა, otsdashvidi dakarguli kotsna), also known as Summer. is a 2000 Georgian film directed by Nana Jorjadze that contains elements of fantasy or magical realism. It was featured during the Directors' Fortnight at the 2000 Cannes Film Festival. The film was also Georgia's submission to the 73rd Academy Awards for the Academy Award for Best Foreign Language Film, but was not accepted as a nominee.

== Production ==
Produced by Egoli Films (now Egoli Tossell Productions), along with British Screen Productions, Canal+, and others.

Filming took place from August–November, 1999 in Georgia, Greece, and Los Angeles, California. Shots of the moon and a solar eclipse were filmed in Munich, Germany. The film also includes footage from the 1974 erotic French film Emmanuelle.

== Plot ==
Fourteen-year old Sybilla (Nutsa Kukhianidze) comes to a small village in Georgia for a summer visit to her grandmother. (The specific year is not given in the film.) At the beginning, Mickey (Shalva Iashvili), a young teen, is heard in a voice-over, stating that Sybilla that summer had promised him 100 kisses, but that he only received 73 (leaving the 27 missing kisses of the title). The film's plot is episodic, with Sybilla running freely about the village and countryside, observing different people, and sometimes entering their homes uninvited. Although she is often accompanied by Mickey, who is close to her own age, she develops a strong crush on his 41-year-old father, Alexander (Yevgeni Sidikhin), who is an astronomer.

During the course of her stay, Sybilla witnesses the relationships and infidelities of different characters, which become even more erotic after most of the town has attended a screening of the 1974 French erotic film Emmanuelle. Mickey and Sybilla also see the film, hidden behind the theater screen. Some of the villagers' affairs are comic, especially an encounter between an engineer and another man's wife when his penis is stuck in a ball-bearing ring. Other affairs have even less pleasant outcomes.

Sybilla becomes friends with a French ship's captain (Pierre Richard), who has towed his ship to the outskirts of the village looking for his "lost sea." Sybilla also spies on and sometimes surreptitiously interferes with Alexander's seductions of other women, but she goes too far when she sneaks into his bed at night, asking Alexander to marry her and promising that she will be a better wife than any of the other women. Alexander, startled out of his sleep, immediately orders her to leave, but when Mickey sees Sybilla and his father, both half-naked, outside the house, he assumes that they have consummated an affair and grabs his father's rifle. As Sybilla runs away, she hears a shot and joins the captain on his ship, which he is towing toward a river. As the ship enters the river and finally reaches open water, Mickey's voice-over repeats, stating that he received only 73 of the promised kisses.

== Awards ==
- 2000 Phedon Papamichael won the Prix Vision at the Avignon Film Festival
- 2000 Nana Jorjadze won the Prix Tournage at the Avignon Film Festival
- 2000 Nana Jorjadze won the Golden Aphrodite at the Love is Folly International Film Festival, Bulgaria
- 2001 Nana Jorjadze won the Special Prize of the Jury at the Brussels European Film Festival

== Reception ==
The film did not receive widespread distribution in the United States, and the few English-language reviews tended to be negative, citing the episodic nature of the plot, what seemed to be confusing fantasy elements, unclear cultural references in the film, and lack of clear character motivation.

Todd McCarthy, reviewing the film for Variety, complained about "the cloying, overdone sense of whimsy that dominates the picture." Although he praised Kuchanidze's portrayal of Sybilla as a character who "has a confidence and physical assertiveness well beyond her years," he still found her actions "tiresome after a while" and that the director and her screenwriter husband "allow their film to be defined by the randomness of the “crazy” episodes rather than exercising discipline over them to bring cohesion and meaning to the picture."

== See also ==
- Cinema of Georgia
- List of submissions to the 73rd Academy Awards for Best Foreign Language Film
