= Nutsa Kukhianidze =

Georgian actress

- Born: 8 August 1983 (age 42); Tbilisi, Georgian SSR
- Occupation: Actress
- Years active: 1998–present

Nutsa Kukhianidze (Georgian: ნუცა კუხიანიძე; born 8 August 1983) is a Georgian actress. She appeared in more than twelve films since 1998.

== Selected filmography ==
Year	Title	Role	Notes
2000	27 Missing Kisses	Sibylla	
2002	The Good Thief	Anne	
2004	Mathilde	Mathilde	
2005	A Trip to Karabakh	Iana	
2014	Tbilisi, I Love You	Nana	
2015	The Summer of Frozen Fountains	Annie	
