= Jelena Tinska =

Serbian actor-journalist

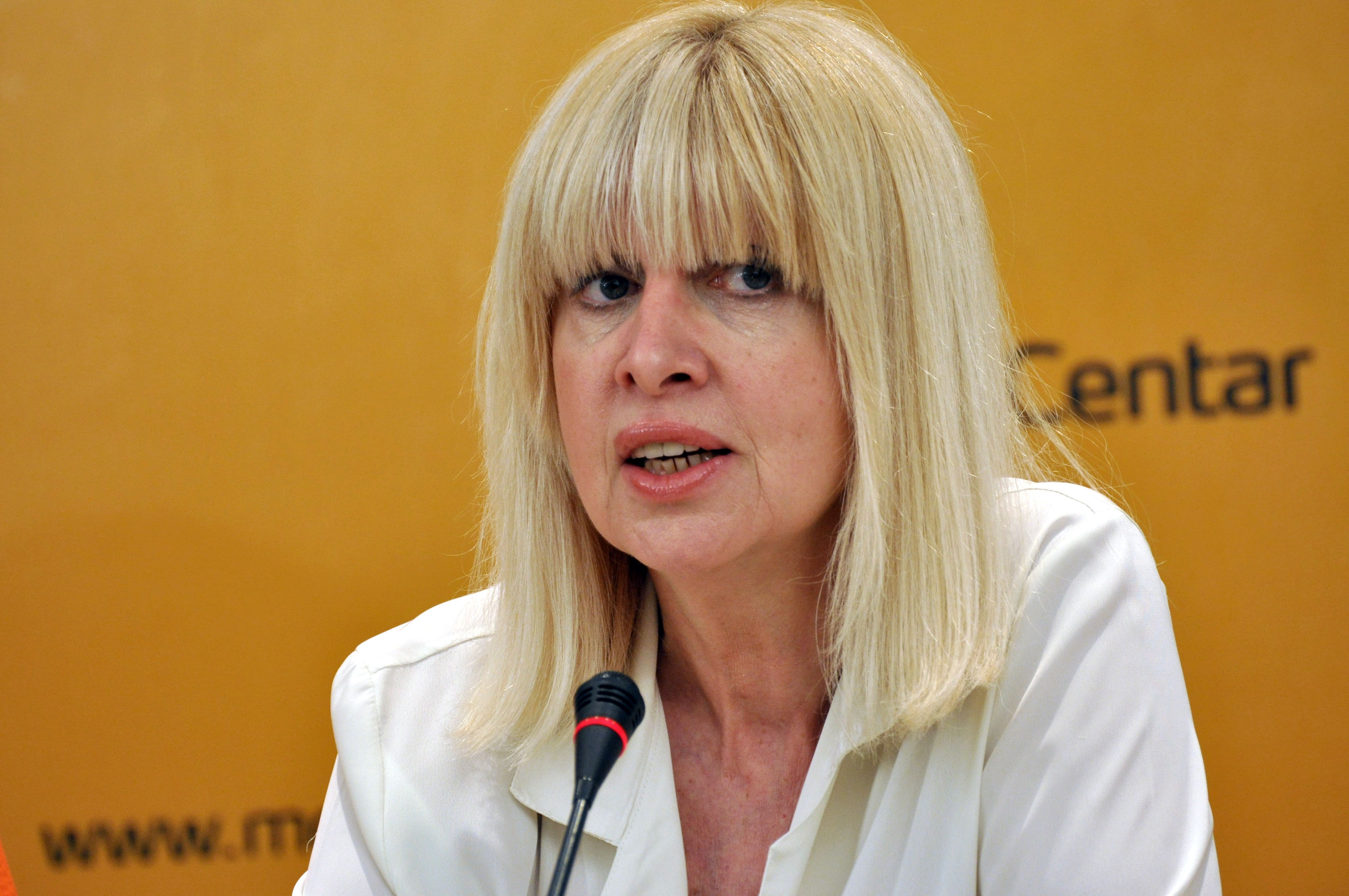
- Jelena Tinska (2009)
- Born: Jelena Petrović; 25 April 1950 (age 75); Zemun, Belgrade, Yugoslavia
- Occupations: Actress, ballerina, dancer, columnist, novelist, writer, television presenter
- Years active: 1956–present
- Spouse(s): First (1972–76); Second (1980); Third (1998)
- Children: Milica Zelda Tinska (daughter); 1 other

Jelena Tinska (Serbian Cyrillic: Јелена Тинска; born Jelena Petrović (Serbian Cyrillic: Јелена Петровић); 25 April 1953) is a Serbian actress, ballerina, dancer, writer, columnist and television presenter. She is also the president of Fond "Orion" and "Nojeva Barka", an association for animal protection and well being.

== Background ==
Tinska's father was Aleksandar Petrović, writer ("Sladak zivot na srpski nacin") and a translator of Shakespeare.

She studied classical ballet from the age of 5 for 12 years, and graduated from the ballet school "Lujo Davico". Following graduation, she worked as a professional ballet, jazz and contemporary dancer in Yugoslavia in various famous ballet groups under Ivanka Lukateli, Boris Radak, Petar Slaj, and "Lokice", later studying drama at The Academy of Dramatic Arts in Belgrade. From 1979, she worked in Belgrade in Theatre Dusko Radovic, as an actress. She is fluent in English, French and Serbian languages.

In 2003 Tinska moved from Belgrade to Novi Sad to work for the private television station Pannonia.

== Filmography ==
Television

- Sedmorica mladih (1970)
- Maksimetar (1970)
- Dva drugara (1976)
- Profesionalci (1978)
- Sedam plus sedam (1978)
- Nedeljom po podne (1978)
- Bilo, pa proslo (1980)
- Podijum (1980) (TV)
- Ne tako davno (1984)
- Formula 1 (1984)
- Smesne i druge price (1986)
- Frka (1986)
- Bolji zivot (1987)
- I to se zove sreca (2 episodes, 1987)
- Bolji zivot 2 (1990)
- 7+7 (1994)
- Sesto culo (1 episode, 2010

Film

- Cipelice na asfaltu (1956)
- Ima ljubavi, nema ljubavi (1968)
- Pjevam danju, pjevam nocu (1979)
- Snovi, zivot, smrt Filipa Filipovica (1980
- Sok od sljiva (1981)
- Smrt gospodina Goluze (1982)
- Nesto izmedju (1983)
- The Misfit Brigade (1987)
- Svedski aranzman (1989)
