= Santa Esperanza =

2006 novel by Aka Morchiladze

- Author: Aka Morchiladze
- Original title: Santa Esperanza
- Language: Georgian
- Genre: Detective fiction Absurdist fiction
- Publisher: Pendo Verlag
- Publication date: 2006
- Publication place: Georgia
- Media type: Print (Hardback
- Pages: 850 pages
- ISBN: 978-3866120945

Santa Esperanza is a 2004 non-linear novel by Georgian writer Aka Morchiladze. Santa Esperanza can be read in any order, an unusual format for a novel.

== Non-linear format ==
As the entire story is narrated in a particular way, there are certain rules for the reader to follow. Santa Esperanza has neither a cover, nor an ordinary binding. This is a coarse traveler’s bag full of booklets and a map. Each of 36 booklets has its own number and color (faded brown, yellow, green and blue). They remind of playing cards and invite the reader to play the literary game: read the booklets in different order and you will get either 4 different novels, 9 large stories, 36 short stories or one huge novel.

== Plot ==
Santa Esperanza is a multi-cultural country stretched on three small islands lost somewhere in the middle of the Black Sea. The islands are inhabited by the Georgians, the Genoese (descendants of the Black Sea settlers), the Turks and the British. The islands are often visited by tourists, who essentially view the place as an earthly Paradise. However, there are occasional tourists who take a closer look at the distinct and singular culture, as well as the traditions turned into taboos.

Since the Crimean War, the Island has been under British rule. Apparently, at that time they leased the three islands for 150 years from the last governor Sarri-Beg, a Turk of Georgian origin. The main story of the novel unfolds in 2002, when the British leave the islands and Santa Esperanza gains independence. The rivalry between the local powerful clans grows into a civil war, which has no clear political coloring, it rather is a clash of spiritual monsters reared during the lull of several centuries. For this reason, the war has no obvious cause, and the only tangible conflict is the primacy of the clan to receive the state insignia from the British Governor. The hostilities are instigated by the Visramianis, the wealthiest Georgian clan, owners of one of the islands. The family traditions and internal regulations comprise a sophisticated system of numerous prohibitions and complicated, opinionated restrictions, which eventually causes dramatic developments in the personal lives of the younger generation.

One of the central stories is a love relation between Salome Visramiani and Sandro da Costa, the heir of an eminent Genoese family. For nearly twenty years the Visramianis have been fighting the relationship of their girl with the lad brought up on completely different principles and traditions. The Visramianis call themselves ‘the Preserved’ while looking down on the Genoese, considering them foreigners, and opposing the marriage of the loving couple.

The love between Salome and Sandro, which began in school, finishes tragically: in the ensuing chaos, Salome, turned into a drug addict in the turmoil, becomes the head of her family, which eventually brings Sandro, the young poet stranded in the other part of the city torn by the hostilities, to commit suicide. The novel abounds in extracts from his diary and unsent letters, telling their adventures from childhood to the war onset.

Another narrative line of the novel describes the life of Data, the prodigal son of the Visramiani clan. He is obsessed with playing cards, an ungainly and unacceptable pastime for the millionaire’s family. Data’s appearance on the pages uncovers yet another layer in the traditions and cultural life of Santa Esperanza, related to a popular local card game Intee (‘run’). The 36 booklets of the novel are designed following the Intee structure and their titles represent individual cards. The game is absolutely dissimilar to any other known card game, as it presupposes its own rules combined with no less complicated regulations reflecting life itself. The other local tradition that Data is tightly linked to is the singing: a unique kind of folk song, the Blue Song, only performed by women. Due to their proverbial passion, they were prescribed to hide their faces behind veils. Even nowadays, as a result of the ancient custom, the women remain faceless and nameless singing in clubs with restricted access. The emergence of the Blue Songs was rather strange too: a woman would sit at the waterfront, accompanying the waves with her wordless, but deeply emotional singing. Data is infatuated by Kesane, one of the singers. She also falls victim to the civil war: captured by the guardsmen, she jumps from the Citadel keep. Data, together with Panteleimon, an Orthodox monk, his only and the most loyal friend, flee the turmoil in a boat, not knowing whether they are going to ever reach any coast. The Eastern Orthodox Monastery is the oldest stone building of the island. It was here that the monks used to write the local history, preserving and unveiling the past in their chronicles. One of the main metaphors of the novel is a pair of windows. One is in the Monastery, through which a monk first observed a strangely grieving woman singing her Blue Song on the beach many years ago. The other is in the Citadel (which housed the museum during the British rule) from which Kesane, the bluemarina, jumped. These two windows have been facing each other for centuries over the old Slave Market Square, used for exactly that purpose in the Middle Ages. One can get an absolutely stunning view of Santa City from these windows.

It is through the Monastery window that an old-fashioned arrow finds its prey, Nick, a mobster seeking refuge on Santa Esperanza. He fled Georgia only to find himself involved in the islanders’ entangled relationships. The Visramianis force him to marry Salome, but a mysterious intrigue and a constant necessity to hide, make him an irreconcilable opponent of his new family. There are 25 active characters in the novel. Among them are three British intelligence agents trying to ensure a peaceful transition of power. The British political priority is a formal hand-over of the island to the direct descendant of Sarri-Beg, the last governor. This happens to be an old woman known as Queen Agatha, who lives alone in considerable poverty in her small cottage. Nick, the Georgian mobster, and Parna the Standard Bearer, a professional gambler and Data’s friend, are among her courtiers, who share a tragic end with their Sovereign.

Another line of the plot is the story of the Sungalis, who make up the fighting force of the opposing sides. This ethnic group, inhabiting one of the three islands, has its own century-old insular traditions and customs, demonstrating unwillingness to mingle and inter-marry the multi-cultural population of the main island.

Seven or eight centuries ago, having decided to safeguard them, one of the Georgian kings asked the then governor of Santa Esperanza to take these people under his protection. (It was not uncommon for the Georgian rulers of the olden days to hide entire villages from the Mongol tax-collectors.)

The Sungalis are illiterate peasants with a militant spirit, who strictly follow their archaic traditions and live in small communities on their island, where everyone is everyone else’s relative. In the tourist attraction areas they work as guards in cafes, restaurants, clubs and hotels. These people are extremely open-hearted and ingenuous, though fighting and warfare is in their blood. With the Esperanza clans it is an old tradition to take them as servants, guards and bailiffs. As a result, every clan has a formidable host of the Sungalis at its disposal.

The Sungalis have their own hereditary priests, but they don’t liaise with any official church. These people stranded in the history have two leaders: a retired bailiff Khetia, who keeps a country guest-house, and Martia, the head of the Visramiani security. The friendship and enmity of the two men with complex characters determine much in the narrative. Sly and crafty Khetia leads the rebellion. He is the one behind the entire intrigue, which eventually threw the country into the civil war. Resisting the whole idea of the war with all his heart, Martia nevertheless finds himself deeply involved in it, which finally leads to his death.

Martia is hopelessly in love with Salome, also adored by a former sailor Luka, who is the author of a once best-seller. Luka’s character seems to have travelled from an old-fashioned novel. Despite numerous hardships, he radiates kindness and cheerfulness, his unbelievable stories and adventures entertain everyone around him. Luka’s line is entwined with that of his ex-wife, Jessica de Rider, the author of popular romances.

One of the characters is Lamour the Walker, the representative of an old local trade: in the pre-newspaper times, his ancestors used to make a living by passing the news across and between the islands. But he manages to combine his hereditary trade with the job of a private eye, which enables him to sell gossip in a most cynical manner. Another character is Monica Uso di Mare, a journalist desperately in love with Sandro da Costa. She is the reason of unhappiness of an English writer Edmond Clever, who is famous for his several books featuring Santa Esperanza. One of his books is In Search of the Lost Pipe dedicated to yet another local myth: governor Ali-Bey had a pipe of such length that its end rested on the other island and seagulls were perched on it. Several pieces of the legendary pipe are truly sacred for a lot of islanders. One of them is Morad-Bey, a coffee-shop owner, trying to collect all the pieces in order to put them together. Rummaging through Queen Agatha’s possessions, Alfredo da Costa, the Museum Director, comes across a sack full of the pipe pieces. Three British agents assemble them only to find that Ali-Bey’s pipe was actually much shorter than it was believed. Alfredo da Costa, Sandro’s uncle and the sole survivor of the family, sets to work on the family history in the post-war Santa City.

Just before the hostilities began, austere and mighty patriarch Constantine Visramiani died of haemorrhage. On his deathbed he clearly realised where his ambition had brought the entire country, but was unable to say anything due to serious brain damage. However, he managed to scribble the word ‘run’ on the blanket for his grandson Data to see. Data and Salome’s mother Kaya becomes a hostage of her own clan. Salome succeeds in putting an end to the hostilities, but the flourishing Santa Esperanza of the British period is razed to the ground. The main characters are dead. The culture and traditions reigning the small country throughout the centuries lie waste. The book finishes with the dramatic events unfolding on the Sungali Island, as it is attacked by the peace-keeping forces from three sides.
