= The Barracks (film) =

- Russian: Барак
- Directed by: Valeriy Ogorodnikov
- Written by: Valeriy Ogorodnikov; Viktor Petrov
- Produced by: Stanislav Arkhipov; Viktor Izvekov; Rolf Jaster; Valeriy Ogorodnikov; Leonid Yarmolnik
- Starring: Irina Senotova; Yuliya Svezhakova; Evgeniy Sidikhin; Nina Usatova; Sergey Kachanov
- Cinematography: Yuriy Klimenko; Anatoly Lapshov
- Edited by: Valeriy Ogorodnikov; Galina Tanayeva
- Release date: 1999
- Countries: Russia; Germany
- Language: Russian

The Barracks (Russian: Барак) is a 1999 Russian drama film directed by Valeriy Ogorodnikov.

== Plot ==
People of different nationalities and character settled in one hut. And suddenly the blockade Olga comes to them...

== Cast ==
- Irina Senotova
- Yuliya Svezhakova
- Evgeniy Sidikhin as Bolotin
- Nina Usatova
- Sergey Kachanov
- Natalya Egorova
- Leonid Yarmolnik
- Artyom Gusev
- Dmitri Bulba
- Aleksey Devotchenko
