= The Summer of Frozen Fountains =

- Film poster
- Directed by: Vano Burduli
- Written by: David Chubinishvili; Vano Burduli
- Produced by: Vano Burduli; Tinatin Kajrishvili; Lasha Khalvashi; Sergey Selyanov
- Starring: Nutsa Kukhianidze; Ia Sukhitashvili; Andrius Paulavicius; Giorgi Nakashidze
- Edited by: Vano Burduli; Boris Mnukhin
- Music by: Levan Yosebidze
- Release date: 16 November 2015 (Tallinn)
- Running time: 103 minutes
- Countries: Georgia, Russia
- Language: Georgian

The Summer of Frozen Fountains (Georgian: სხვისი სახლი) is a 2015 Georgian comedy-drama film directed by Vano Burduli.

== Cast ==
- Ia Sukhitashvili - Lika
- Nutsa Kukhianidze - Annie
- Salome Demuria - Marie
- Anamaria Burduli - Girl at the gift shop
- Dato Darchia - Zura
- Sandro Gabilaia - Gio
- Anri Jokharidze - Sandro
- Tornike Kasrashvili - Mikho
- Darejan Khachidze - Mikho's mother
- Dati Khrikadze - Nick
- Shota Kristesashvili -Annie's father
- Nato Murvanidze - Diana
- Giorgi Nakashidze - Merab
- Eka Nijaradze - Sally's mother
- Andrius Paulavicius - Brian
- Lika Sturua - Sally
- Levan Yosebidze - Zaza
