= Mathilde (film) =

2004 drama film

Mathilde is a 2004 drama film written and directed by Nina Mimica and starring Jeremy Irons, Nutsa Kukhianidze and Sinéad Cusack. It was a co-production between several countries. The screenplay concerns a young girl who attempts to kill a UN peacekeeper after the war in Croatia.

== Plot summary ==
A young girl attempts to kill a UN peacekeeper after the war in Croatia, leading to an investigation into the circumstances of their first meeting.

== Cast ==
- Jeremy Irons - Col. De Petris
- Nutsa Kukhianidze - Mathilde
- Dejan Aćimović - Croat corporal
- Radko Polič - Unemployed major
- Ksenija Marinković - Croat captain
- Lea Gramsdorff - Bella
- Richard Harrington - Babyface
- Miki Manojlović - Journalist
- Sinéad Cusack - Wife of Col. De Petris
- Svetozar Cvetković - Paragic
- Marko Petrović - Soldier
