= Aka Morchiladze =

Georgian writer and literary historian

Giorgi Akhvlediani
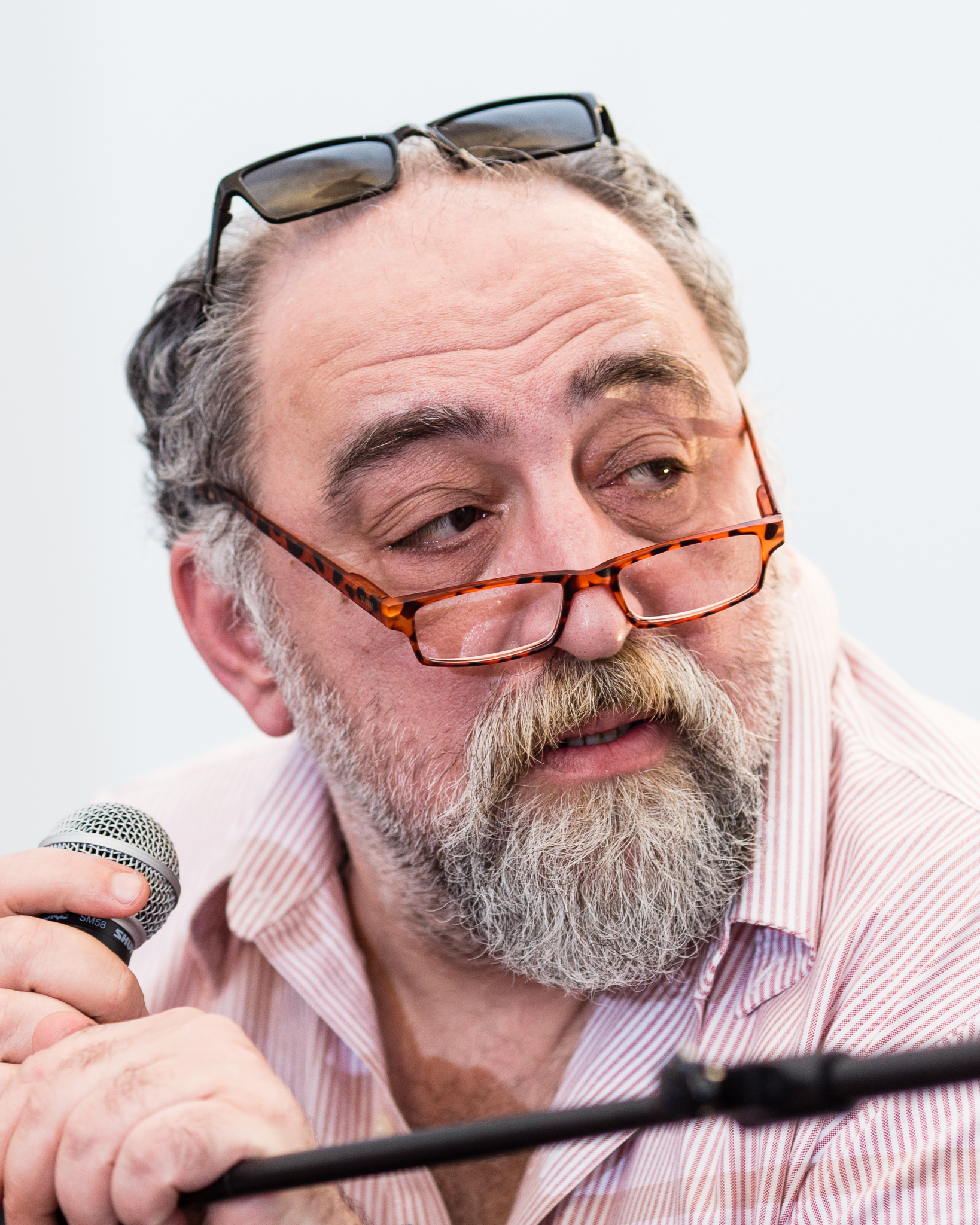
- Morchiladze in 2017
- Born: 10 November 1966 (age 59); Tbilisi, Georgia
- Occupation: Novelist,
- Writing career
- Pen name: Aka Morchiladze
- Notable work: Santa Esperanza (2004)
- Literary movement: Postmodernism

Aka Morchiladze (Georgian: აკა მორჩილაძე) is the pen name of Giorgi Akhvlediani (გიორგი ახვლედიანი) (born 10 November 1966), a Georgian writer and literary historian who authored some of the best-selling prose of post-Soviet Georgian literary fiction. Morchiladze's work shows reorientation of the early 21st-century Georgian literature towards the Western influences.

== Biography ==
Born in Tbilisi, Morchiladze graduated in 1988 from the Department of History, Tbilisi State University, where he later taught. In the 1990s, he worked as a sports journalist and literary columnist for Tbilisi's press, notably for the leading sports daily Sarbieli, writing under the pseudonym Gio Akhvlediani. His extensive collection of sports essays and letters published in the newspaper was later compiled into a two-volume book titled In Sarbieli ("სარბიელში"), covering his work from 1995 to 2005. 1998, Morchiladze's twenty novels and three collections of short stories have been published by the Sulakauri Publishing. Several of his works have been filmed and staged.

== Bibliography ==
- Journey to Karabakh, Bakur Sulakauri Publishing, 1992
- Dogs of Paliashvili Street, Bakur Sulakauri Publishing, 1995, 2002, 2011
- Flight Over Madatov Island and Back, Bakur Sulakauri Publishing, 1998, 2004, 2011
- Disappearance on Madatov Island, Bakur Sulakauri Publishing, 2001
- Your Adventure, Bakur Sulakauri Publishing, 2002
- The Other, Bakur Sulakauri Publishing, 2002, 2011
- The Book, Bakur Sulakauri Publishing, 2003, 2011
- The Wretched of the Desert, Bakur Sulakauri Publishing, 2003
- Down With the Corn Republic, Bakur Sulakauri Publishing, 2003, 2011
- A Whale on Madatov Island, Bakur Sulakauri Publishing, 2004
- Santa Esperanza, Bakur Sulakauri Publishing, 2004, 2008
- Mr. Deaxley’s Silent Box, Bakur Sulakauri Publishing, 2005
- Venera’s Dream, Bakur Sulakauri Publishing, 2005
- The Paper Bullet, Bakur Sulakauri Publishing, 2006, 2011
- Maid in Tiflis, Bakur Sulakauri Publishing, 2007
- Of Old Hearts and Swords, Bakur Sulakauri Publishing, 2007
- Once in Georgia, Saga Publishing House, 2008
- The Secret Keeper’s Belt, Bakur Sulakauri Publishing, 2008
- Mameluk, Bakur Sulakauri Publishing, 2009
- Obolé, Bakur Sulakauri Publishing, 2011
- Georgian Notebooks, Bakur Sulakauri Publishing, 2013
- The Shy Emerald, Bakur Sulakauri Publishing, 2013
- Shadow on the Road, Bakur Sulakauri Publishing, 2014
- One Hundred Million Pounds Away, Artanuji Publishing House, 2015
