= Migrant domestic workers in Lebanon =

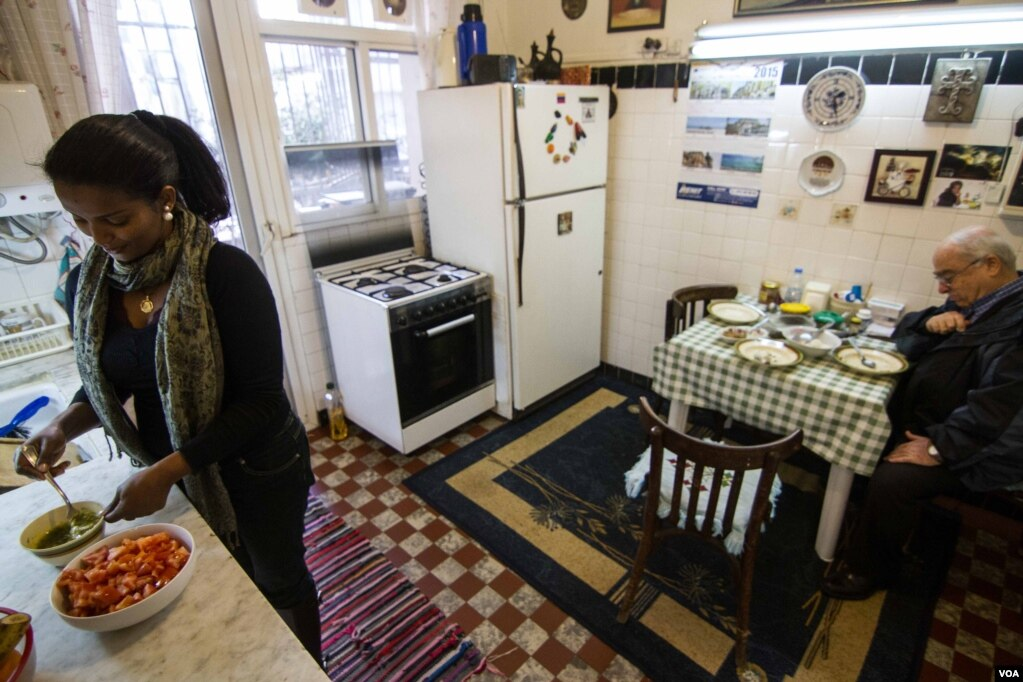
Migrant worker under the Kafala system serves lunch to her employer

Lebanon has gone through many stages in its absorption of migrant workers, both before and after the Lebanese Civil War. This development has led to multiple problems regarding integration in Lebanese society. The ambiguity of the Kafala system in Lebanon has resulted in migrant domestic workers facing many legal issues and violations to their basic human rights. The government has largely been inactive and ineffective in implementing laws to protect migrant domestic workers.

== Historical background ==
Until the 20th-century, slaves worked in the private households before slavery in Lebanon was prohibited. Before the start of the Lebanese Civil War young girls, aged ten and upwards, who came from poor Lebanese families or from other countries such as Syria, Palestine and Egypt were employed in Lebanese households. The girl's parents collected their salary annually though the girls remained with their employers until they got married. Following the beginning of the Lebanese Civil War, many Arab domestic workers decided to leave due to a general economic decline and a crisis in security. That in turn left a gap in the country's domestic workforce. A change in situation came about with the arrival of African and Asian migrant workers. The first migrants arrived in the late 1970s. Initially, the highest percentage of migrant workers were male until the 1980s and early 1990s when an increasing feminization of the migrant labour force became evident.

The migrants, mostly from Sri Lanka and The Philippines, arrived together in large groups through both illegal and semi-legal channels. The migrant labour was supported by the sending countries because of the foreign exchange remittances which helped to reduce the country's debt.

In 1998 it was estimated that there were 100,000 Sri Lankans, 30,000 Indians and 20,000 Filipinos living in Lebanon. There were also an estimated 40,000 Egyptians and 250,000 Syrians.

The sending countries have been in pursuance of effectual policies concerning overseas employment. After 1987, the Lebanese government failed to answer the requests of the sending countries to establish an inclusion of certain conditions in the employment contract. The requests were due to the failure of private recruitment agencies in following licensing procedures, in addition to reports of physical abuse.

== Recruitment process ==
The recruitment process of a migrant domestic worker into Lebanon is conducted by sponsorship. The worker has to receive an invitation before being granted a working permit to enter the country. The invitation comes through a recruiting agency either by use of the services of their counterparts in the worker's country of origin or directly from the agency itself and sometimes at the request of an individual employer. First, the Ministry of Labour issues preliminary work authorization to migrant domestic workers. In 2010, the Ministry of Labour issued an approximate 118,000 work permits to migrant domestic Workers. Next, the Ministry of Interior issues entry visas through the General Directorate for General Security. Then the General Directorate of General Security authorizes the legal entry of migrant domestic workers and arranges work permission and residence when they arrived in the country. Lastly, the sponsor's name is located on the migrant domestic worker's entry visa, residence and work permit. The visa is for a three-month period and the name of the sponsor is included in the passport. When the migrant domestic worker arrives at the airport they are subjected to an immigration routine which includes the handing over of their passports to the Lebanese General Security in order to process the papers, while the migrant domestic worker waits to be collected by their sponsor. After this, the sponsor brings the migrant domestic worker to a local agency for a basic medical checkup.

There are no clear criteria set by the government in terms of the requirements needed to issue an agency licence. In order to open an agency, an agent must place a $33,500 non-interest-bearing guarantee in Bank de l'Habitat which is the government's Housing Bank. There are an estimated 310 licensed agents in Lebanon. Out of this number, 44 are operating as genuine agents with office and staff while the remaining agents hold licenses, they do not focus on the obtaining and placing Migrant Domestic Workers in positions but sell their quotas to active agencies.

In order to recruit migrant domestic workers, Lebanese recruitment agencies collaborate with agencies in the migrant sending countries. Migrant domestic workers are required to pay a fee to the local agent in their home country, usually a large sum of money which causes them to incur a large debt. Once the fee transaction is complete the agency arranges the transportation. The employer is obliged to meet the migrant worker at the airport gate where a general security guard who holds the employee's passport will hand it over directly to the employer. A medical examination and the resulting report must be fulfilled before the work permit is issued and the insurance for the worker must be paid by the employer within three months. A standard unified contract is drawn up which is more in favour of the employer than the migrant worker.

=== Legal aspect ===
Article 7 of the Lebanese Labour Law explicitly excludes domestic workers from the standard labor protections given to the other classes of employees. The domestic workers have been denied the right to freedom of association and banned from union membership under Article 92 of the Labour Law, added to which they have almost no legal safeguards which leaves them subject to abuse and exploitation. The decision made by the Lebanese forbidding the domestic workers forming their own union or being a member of one would be considered a violation of the International Covenant on Civil and Political Rights (ICCPR) which Lebanon ratified in 1972 and entered into force in 1976. Article 22 of ICCPR stipulates that "Everyone shall have the right to freedom of association with others, including the right to form and join trade unions for the protection of his interests."

The Standard Unified Contract is a contract between the Employer and the migrant domestic worker. It was drawn up by The Ministry of Labour and it is the main source of the worker's rights. The right for a clean and private place in which to relax in their free time. Also, clean and appropriate clothes, and sufficient food (Article 8). The right to medical care when needed, including dental and eye care, the costs of which should be met by the employer. The workers are covered by health insurance in the case of emergency (Article 9). The right to work for ten non-consecutive hours every day with frequent short breaks, and at least eight continuous hours of rest at night (Article 11). The right for a weekly rest period of 24 hours, and deciding which day in the week is to be discussed between the worker and the employer (Article 12). The right for annual leave consists of 6 days also the dates should be discussed between the employer and the worker (Article 12). The right for a return ticket at the end of the contract (Article 13). The right for one phone call every month on the charge of the employer (Article 14). The right for sick leave when there is a medical report, half a month with pay and half a month with half pay (Article 15). There is no stipulation in the contract for any free legal assistance for the domestic workers.

In spite of the rights mentioned in an official contract, in practice the rights were ineffective. In the case of conflicts matters were often settled out of court, not only in the case of nonpayment of salary but also in the case of physical abuses. Under the Kafala system a domestic worker might be administratively detained in the event of fleeing the household of the employer. That in turn places the employer in a better position when negotiating the rights of the worker. As a result, the domestic workers often drop the charges against the employer or even refrain from filing a case before the court.

=== The Kafala system ===
The Kafala system involves a sponsor who has the legal responsibility for a migrant domestic worker during a contract period, making the worker dependent upon the sponsor. The Kafala system is not legally binding in Lebanon because recruiters cannot act as a sponsor. Instead the system is made up of a number for administrative regulations, customary practices and legal requirements which bind the worker to the recruiter temporarily.. Once in Lebanon, the migrant domestic worker is assigned an employer. A worker may not change employer or break the terms of the contract unless the employer signs a release waiver. This must be done before a notary public and Lebanese authorities give an official release. A worker becomes illegal if they leave without the consent of their sponsor and the official release from the authorities. Human Rights Watch has said that the Kafala system in Lebanon puts workers at risk of exploitation and abuse, while Anti-Slavery International has said that the system is one of the major causes of vulnerability of migrant workers. The Kafala system means that the sponsor of the migrant domestic worker is legally responsible for the migrant and the state's responsibility for 'alien surveillance' is then passed on to the employer.

The Kafala system has a notable impact on the predominately female migrant workers who often face exploitation and abuse within private households. Female migrant workers are excluded from protections under family violence laws while the law may apply to their families, when they are considered Lebanese, it does not cover their workspace. Yet, they are also excluded from the Lebanese Labor Code leaving them with a lack of resources against abuse by their employers but also in their families. Scholars such as Maya Mikdashi highlighted these differences as crucial to understanding the role of Sex in Lebanon's sectarian system. According to her, these differences contribute to a better understanding of how Sex in a sectarian state reproduces political society across an intersectional grid including modular and multiple articulations of the categories of sexes, sects, citizens and noncitizens.

In April 2019, Amnesty International urged Lebanon government to end the Kafala system which has led to the abuse of thousands of domestic workers in the Mediterranean country.

By suspending the implementation of a new standard unified contract, Lebanon's State Shura Council caused a sharp blow to the migrant domestic worker rights. The new contract allowed workers to terminate their contract without the consent of their employer, dismantling a key abusive aspect of the kafala system.

== Agencies ==
Employment agencies play three roles in the process: recruiter, immigration consultant and mediator. A labour recruiter can be either public or private and offers labour recruitment services. These businesses profit from the recruitment of migrants workers from one country and their allocation in jobs in another. Agents charge fees and commission for their services to migrant domestic workers. Sri Lankan migrant domestic worker pay an estimated $1,300–1,600 to a Lebanese agent while potential workers in the Philippines and Ethiopia pay $2,400–3,500 and $1,700–2,100 respectively. The Lebanese agent will also earn $300–600 in commissions. This money covers travel costs, Lebanese government visa fees, and the agency fee. In some cases, the first three months' salary is signed away as payment. The agency fees cover the cost of airfare, government charges for issue of visas and agency commissions. The residency, work permit, notary fee and annual insurance are not included in the initial sum and are the responsibility of the employer sum which is calculated to $500. There is a difference in the amount the agency receives for each group of workers depending on their country of origin. One example is the migrant workers from the Philippines who demand higher costs and monthly salaries because they have a good command of English, both spoken and written. They are deemed better educated and therefore are given a higher respect as maids than those from other countries. Some employment agencies contract migrant domestic worker out on short-term contracts at a cost of up to $450 per month. The high prices involved in recruiting a migrant domestic worker means that employers take precautions to make sure the worker does not leave their position before their contract is up. The migrant domestic worker is also required to make a deposit of $1,000 in a Lebanese bank in order to cover a return ticket home, which is never available to the worker. Because of the conditions present in Lebanon, legal and illegal agencies flourish and due to the Kafala system a migrant has to rely on agencies to find a Lebanese sponsor and employer.

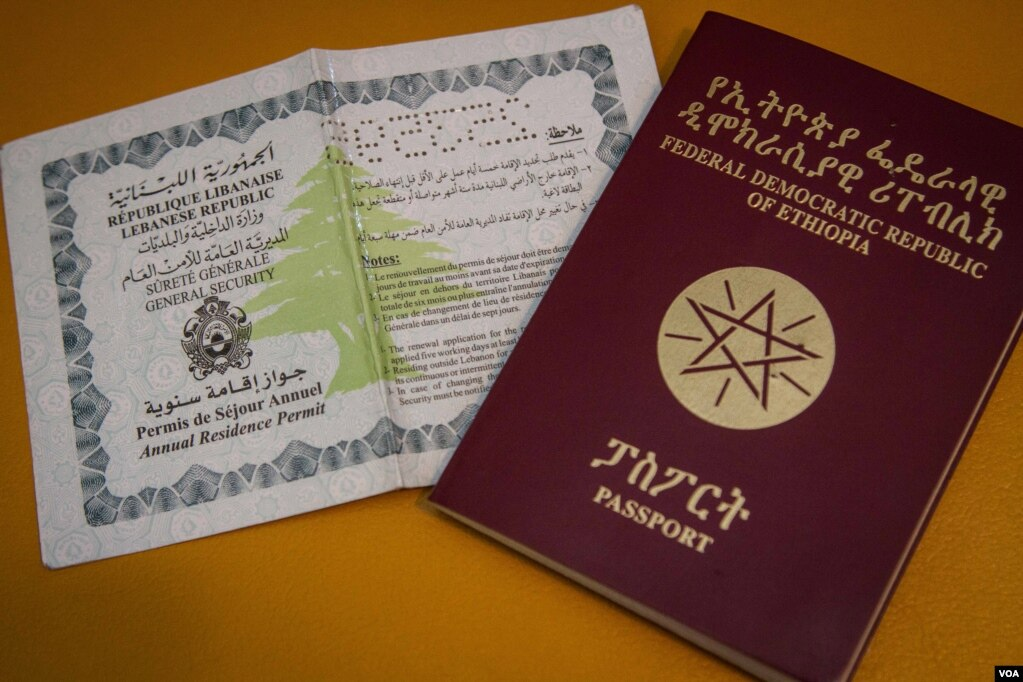
Under the Kafala system, it is common for an employer to have possession of their domestic worker's vital documents.

Under the Lebanese employment system, recruitment agencies are liable to provide a replacement within the first three months after a migrant domestic worker decides to discontinue work. These first three months are a preliminary "trial period". In order to minimize having to do this, agencies advise employers to take measures to limit the freedom of the migrant domestic workers through the confiscation of their passport and restrict their communication with the outside world. Recruitment agencies have been known to encourage employers to place restrictions on migrant domestic workers, which include the confiscation of their passport and confinement to the residence. Recruitment agencies in Lebanon receive very little state supervision. A Human Rights Watch report found that workers are often made false promises about the country they are moving to, as well as the work they will do, and the conditions expected in the workplace. They are also misled about the salaries they can expect to receive.

=== Involvement of home country ===
Many women migrating for domestic work pay fees to agencies in their home countries, which sometimes means entering into debt or selling assets to cover the cost. Agency fees in Sri Lanka are around $200, but this varies between countries. Migrant domestic workers from Sri Lanka and the Philippines are often offered training by the recruitment agency in their home country. The training involves lessons on using electrical appliances and cooking Lebanese food.

The government of the Philippines established an Overseas Employment Administration in order to protect emigrant workers from exploitation. In Lebanon, agencies wishing to hire Filipinas for work are required to obtain "Master Employment Contract for Domestic Helpers" from the Embassy of the Philippines in Beirut. The Filipina Worker Resource Center in Beirut provides training seminars to assist in skills upgrading and cultural activities.

=== Recruitment agencies' code of conduct ===
A code of conduct was launched in June 2013, to provide guidance for recruitment agencies on promoting and protecting the rights of migrant domestic workers in Lebanon. The code was developed in consultation with the International Organization for Migration, the Middle East Office of the High Commissioner for Human Rights and put together by the Lebanese Ministry of Labour, the Syndicate of Owners of Recruitment Agencies (SORA) in Lebanon and Caritas Lebanon. The Code of Conduct aims to uphold transparency in business operations; the disclosure of full information about the conditions of employment in Lebanon to the worker; no placements of underage workers; and verification of a worker's qualifications. A workshop was organized by the International Labour Organization in 2013 in order to review the code of conduct and improve mechanisms to protect migrant domestic workers from forms of exploitation. A number of Syndicate of Recruitment Agencies in Lebanon (SORAL) were present to assess the code of conduct and part of a bigger project called "Promoting Rights for Women Domestic Workers in Lebanon" (PROWD).

== Category of Migrant Domestic Workers ==
Migrant Domestic Workers can be classified into three types: live-ins, freelancers and runaways. Live-in migrant domestic workers live in the household of the sponsor for a number of years. During the time, the sponsor is responsible for all financial costs and has a lot of control of the worker.

A freelancer is less controlled and lives on their own terms and works on an hourly basis for different employers. Some freelance workers may have originally entered Lebanon through the Kafala system and decided to remain when their contract finished. Freelancers are required by law to have a sponsor and some business men take this as an opportunity to earn money, sometimes charging up to $1,200.

Runaway migrant domestic workers are former-live in workers who have left their sponsor for a variety of reasons. As soon as the migrant domestic worker leaves their place of residence they are automatically seen as an illegal alien. The migrant domestic worker must then either return to their home country or find a new sponsor.

== Statistical figures ==
As of 2012, the number of migrant workers is estimated to be around 158,000 workers; however, these numbers may be inaccurate due to the fact that many workers come in unofficially. In the process of registering with an agency in their indigenous countries, 63% of the workers end up paying fees for the agency they apply through. When they do end up in Lebanon, the situation turns out different to what they had initially expected. 6% of the workers were misled to believe that they would have other jobs than housework; jobs like security guards or hotel employees. The numbers get higher when it comes to matters of working hours and salaries, 53% of the employees received the salary they were promised. More figures are representing their very working status, 84% were not informed of their working hours, 78% did not receive any information on weekly days off, 64% were not aware of the household composition and 61% did not know whether they would be able to contact their families or not. Considering the figures presented above and the full scope of the Kafala system in Lebanon, as much as 83% of the surveyed said that they would not have traveled to Lebanon had they known of the situation beforehand.

In a report conducted by the Insan Association in 2014, Insan went out to from one household to another; massing to a total of 250 respondents. 80% of the respondents were employers, one of the first questions directed towards these employers is if the employees are in possession of their passports, to which 77.9% of the employers answered "no". The report further clarifies the status of the workers and their rights by explaining that two thirds of the workers had to sign the Standard Unified Contract (SUC) which is their working contract in Arabic, a contract they would simply sign without having their rights explained. On the other hand, 40.6% of the employers themselves explain that they did not understand that SUC document was a working contract and they were less aware of the terms and conditions of the contract themselves. A portion of the employers expressed their view on migrant residency in different ways, 26% believed that the worker should not live outside their working place as that would have negative influence on the worker, moreover 13% expressed that the workers are not capable of living independently. When the employers were asked about the kafala system, 55.8% wanted the system to change. The reason for this is that the employers felt that the burden was too high on them. In fact the figure increased to 65% when the employers were informed of the obligation to reimburse the recruitment fees in case of an early termination of contract by the migrant workers. A large number of the employers even felt that the migrant workers should not be included in the Lebanese labour code, out of fear of the expansion of these rights to other foreigners like the Syrian or Palestinian refugees.

=== Remittances ===
An average domestic worker can earn as much as $250 for ethiopians and $400 for filipina a month, despite the little income; the workers send back the money to their countries. This they do in order to help their families whom are in need of the money, but another direct result of this remittance process is the contribution these workers provide to their country of origin and their economy. In 2008, the Philippines had 13% of its GDP a direct result of foreign remittances sweeping in the country. Sri Lanka, another major workforce contributing state received in 2007 $3.4 billion in remittance and people from the Southeastern, Central & Western African regions has received $7 billion from workers returning money they have earned.

== Government response ==
A contributing factor to the mistreatment and in some cases the death of the domestic workers is the government response or lack thereof. In Lebanon, when a domestic worker has been abused or killed a police report usually never leads to persecution. The Lebanese government; aware of the problem, has signed treaties, yet it has failed to implement any real policies that can protect the workers in their domestic working environment. Looking at Lebanon's own law on Labour rights, Article 7 Paragraph 1 mentions that domestic workers are exempted from the law, therefore any form of domestic worker is not included in the Labour Law and what it has regulated as rights and duties for workers

The government took action into regulating the migrant service business by imposing a law in 2009 aiming for more control on "Migrant Workers Offices", the law simply demands that such an office would register in the ministry of labour; the law emphasizes on the business owner to be a Lebanese citizen with no previous criminal record. It mentions as well the need to provide a location for the workers to stay in, moreover it is not allowed for the business or its clients to abuse the workers and should there be any disputes, they should be reported to the ministry or the appropriate legal entities. Finally, the law identifies the rights of the worker to days off and the responsibility of the office to return the worker within three months of arrival in Lebanon in case the workers refuse to work, escaped from their working place or in case of pregnancy; the law gives more specifics on the duties of the office with regards to the working states of the workers in Lebanon. Other measurements taken by the government of Lebanon includes adding more regulations to the process of bringing foreign workers into the country. The measurements apply on workers from the state of Madagascar, where no office is allowed to bring workers from Madagascar without the approval of the consulate of Madagascar in Lebanon. The offices then are obliged to present the approval document and the application paper to the ministry of labour.

The government put new requirements on the employers, demanding that they deposit a sum of 1,500,000 LBP (1000 $) in the housing bank as a prerequisite to get authorization of employment. The housing bank is a government bank and the deposit is to ensure that the employer pays taxes and covers the airline tickers; should the domestic worker go home. The problem with these requirements is that the money is not used to fulfill its purpose of covering airline tickets when it is needed. The Lebanese government has as well been ineffective with implementing the migration workers ban from entering into Lebanon from the country of Nepal, the Lebanese government simply kept issuing pre-approved work permits and visas.

In 2001 Lebanon's Ministry of Labour closed ten employments agencies that violate labour regulations. The General Security Directorate has improved its enforcement of regulations and the Ministry of Labour regularly meets with embassies of migrant's country of origin in order to insure Migrant Domestic Workers are aware of employment agency regulations and avenues for reporting violations. The Government has produced a pamphlet to raise awareness of migrant trafficking, describe the process to fail a complaint and provides contact details for law enforcement, government agencies and non-governmental organizations.

=== Violations ===
The situation for migrant domestic workers in Lebanon is grim, as the circumstances for them are not improving; the migrant domestic workers have been subjected to violations of their freedom of movement and their right to residency. In early 2014, the general security began deporting children of migrant workers with one or both of their parents. The justification for this move was that the migrants were in Lebanon to work and not create families, it is worthy to note that the implementation of these deportations had been put on hold after pressure from civil society organisations like Insan. By the summer of 2015, the decision to expel migrant domestic workers and their children had been overturned. However, things did not get better for the migrant domestic workers; they now had to deal with tighter control over residency permits. The general security which is the body legally mandated to deal with foreign workers has refused to re-grant some workers their permits on the grounds of refusing to reside with their employees. Despite the fact that the general security exercises force on migrant domestic workers and their presence in the country, this is in fact in violation with the Lebanese legal international commitment, constitution and national laws. One significant problem the migrant domestic workers are subjected to is physical abuse, the problem mainly lies in that there are no repercussions from the behalf of the government. There have been many cases of migrant domestic workers' deaths even and despite that the police does not properly investigate the cases and no employee gets prosecuted for the death. The ministry of labour did take some initiative in creating a hotline for a dispute resolution system, but it is not working effectively because there is a lack of trust in the system and as well a lack of knowledge on the process to state a complaint.

Human Rights observers stated that more than 50% of Lebanon's private beach club owners have barred migrant workers from swimming in their pools and in some cases have physically stopped them from entering. Lebanon also has a mile-long public beach free to all called Ramlat al Baida, where the segregated groups including the migrant workers, were the targets of discrimination. They were moved on to the northern end of the beach where people do not usually go because sewage is poured into the Mediterranean from the high-rise apartments nearby in that area.

Voice of America's report on employers abandoning foreign workers

According to a footage recorded and reported by BBC News on 21 June 2020, Ethiopian maids were being abandoned by their Lebanese employers outside the Ethiopian embassy without any money or food when they could no longer afford them due to severe economic crisis in Lebanon. The embassy would not let them in, compelling them to sleep on the streets. According to The Telegraph, the first group of 35 women were taken into a shelter run by an NGO, and within days, more household maids were left on the streets. There is no official statement issued by the Ethiopian embassy.

During the September 2024 Israeli attacks against Lebanon, reports emerged that migrant domestic workers were being left behind in southern Lebanon to watch over the family homes of their Lebanese employers who had fled north and away from areas under heavy fire. In July 2024, the International Organization for Migration reported that some 28,000 migrants were working in regions like south Lebanon and the eastern Beqaa Valley, that are an active war zone being bombed by Israel. Many of the migrant workers of African origin that were in these heavily targeted regions have since escaped to Beirut and are now homeless due to being turned away from shelters that are housing displaced Lebanese.

=== Government responses by labour-sending countries ===
Several labour-sending countries have issued travel bans or restrictions for Lebanon in recent years, among them Ethiopia, Nepal and the Philippines. However, the Lebanese government has been ineffective with implementing the migration workers ban from entering into Lebanon from the country of Nepal simply kept issuing pre-approved work permits and visas. Madagascar issued its Lebanon ban as a direct consequence of the death of 17 Madagascan domestic migrant workers in 2010 which in 2011 also led the Madagascar Government to fly out 86 domestic migrant worker. Ethiopian women have reportedly tried to bypass restrictions imposed by their government to work as domestic workers in Lebanon by first embarking on journeys to Sudan or Yemen. A figure presented by Anti-Slavery International explains the lack of proper implementation of the travel bans on migrant workers coming to Lebanon, as irregular channels of bringing the workers still operate. The figure in 2010 is 65%, this represents the number of workers who received their work permits despite the fact that they come from countries which are in the travel ban.

== Lebanese civil society response ==
=== Awareness campaigns, Community Building and Lessons ===
In 2010 a grassroots volunteer organization by the name of Migrant Workers Task Force (MWTF) was established which provided language training in English and French for domestic workers. MWTF also took part in advocacy on behalf of domestic migrant workers and initiated an online campaign under the hashtag of #StopKafala in 2014. In 2015 MWTF merged with the Migrant Community Center, an initiative by the Anti-Racism Movement that set up three centers in Beirut in 2011 as well as in Saida and Jounieh in 2016. Apart from language training and other practical courses each centers offers community activities and networking.

=== Trade union movement ===
In a joint effort, ILO and The National Federation of Worker and Employee Trade Unions in Lebanon (FENASOL) have been working towards the establishment of a trade union for domestic workers in Lebanon. FENASOL which aims at the democratization and establishment of an independent trade union movement in Lebanon had already in the past expended their support of workers against legal odds who are neglected or not allowed to formally organize according to the Lebanese Labour Law, including agricultural workers and those operating within the large informal sector. In 2015 The founding congress of the Domestic Worker's Union in Lebanon took place. However, their attempt to be registered with the Lebanese officials was rejected and therefore their legal status remains unsolved due to the missing legal options it operates in:

Until today Lebanon did not sign ILO convention No. 87, the Freedom of Association and Protection of the right to Organize, which states in Article 2 that no prior registration with government officials is needed to form a labour union. Article 86 of the Lebanese Labour Code however specifically states the need for authorization prior to trade union formation. Since there is no deadline for Ministry of Labour to either approve or disapprove the formation of a trade union the authorization process has been criticized to be depended on the political affiliation of the ministers of labour in charge. Article 4 of the Labour Law, and Decree No. 7993 of 1952 list domestic workers as one group of workers who are barred from forming trade unions. Even though article 7 and article 92 allows foreigners to join a union, they are denied to vote for trade union representatives and being elected into such a position.

In the case of the Domestic Worker's Union in Lebanon these legislations were tried to overcome by appointing Lebanese citizen Mariam al-Masri as its first president. In December 2016 founding member of the Domestic Worker's Union and Nepalese activist Sujana Rana was deported from Lebanon in December 2016 without being able to contact a lawyer. Her fellow activist Roja Limbu had been arrested and remains in detention.

=== Emergency hotlines ===
A 24/7 telephone hotline (03 018 019) provided by the Lebanese secular feminist organization KAFA offers legal, emotional and medical advice as well as referral to temporary shelters. KAFA's hotline does not only reach out to female migrant domestic workers but to women and children in general who are facing abuse and violence. Another hotline (1740) has been installed by the Ministry of Labour in cooperation with Caritas Lebanon and through funding from the ILO in 2015.

== Intergovernmental responses ==
=== International Conventions ===
Lebanon has ratified a number of international conventions which can be invoked and applied for Migrant Domestic Workers. The Universal Declaration of Human Rights is enshrined in the Lebanese Constitution which states that all international conventions of which Lebanon is a signatory and supersede domestic law in case of conflict. The Articles which are particularly relevant in the case of Migrant Domestic Workers: Article 5 on torture or cruel, inhuman or degrading treatment or punishment, Article 13 on the right to freedom of movement and the right to employment, Article 23 on free choice of employment and to just, favourable conditions of work and protection against unemployment, and Article 24 on the right to rest and leisure, including reasonable limitation of working hours and holidays with pay.

=== United Nations Conventions ===
A number of United Nations Conventions are relevant including the International Convention on Economic, Social and Cultural Rights, The International Convention on Civil and Political Rights, The Convention on the Elimination of all Forms of Discrimination against Women were all ratified by Lebanon in 1972.

=== International Labour Organization Conventions ===
The International Labour Organization have established a number of conventions which can aid Migrant Domestic Workers. The Migration for Employment Convention 1949, the Migration for Employment Recommendation 1949, and The Migrant Workers Convention of 1975. However, these conventions have not been ratified by Lebanon. The relevant ILO articles which may be used to help migrant domestic workers in Lebanon include: the Convention on Private Employment Agencies 1997. In regards to International Labour Standards, Lebanon has ratified 14 ILO conventions but not all of which can be used to protect migrant domestic workers. Those which can be include: the Abolition of Forced Labour Convention, 1957 and the Discrimination (Employment and Occupation) Convention of 1958.

As part of the International Organization for Migration's awareness raising campaign, in 2005 Maid in Lebanon was released and dealt with issues of torture, exploitation, rape and suicide of Migrant Domestic Workers in Lebanon. A sequel was released in 2009, named Maid in Lebanon II: Voices From Home, which was filmed in Sri Lanka and Lebanon and detailed Lebanese employers and the working conditions of their housekeepers and addresses some of legal aspects of the issue under Lebanese law.

In 2012 the Lebanese Ministry of Labour produced an information guide direct at migrant domestic workers in Lebanon funded by the European Union and under the guidance of the which gives information on how to travel to Lebanon as a migrant domestic worker, the rights and responsibilities owed to you, what to do when in trouble and how to adapt to Lebanese culture including an Arabic language guide.

== Legal Framework on Preventing Exploitation ==
=== National Level ===
The Lebanese Parliament passed on the Punishment for the Crime of Trafficking in Persons and provides a definition of trafficking and of victims of trafficking. The penalty for traffickers is up to 15 years imprisonment and a payment of a fine. In 2015 the International Organization for Migration PAVE Project held a workshop on "Creating a National Protection Framework and Strong Referral Mechanism in Lebanon for Trafficked Victims and Exploited Migrants" which stated that victims need an "enabling environment" and be properly assisted.

=== International Level ===
In 2005, Lebanon ratified the United Nations Trafficking Protocol which obliges the government to prevent and combat human trafficking and provide assistance to victims. The Protocol identifies three constituent elements of human trafficking: an action, a means and a purpose. The Lebanese Government has tried to address the exploitation of migrant workers through raising awareness. Booklets aimed at migrant workers have been produced by the government which focus on legislation, rights and practical information on assistance available to Migrant Domestic Workers.

== Popular culture and artistic adaption ==
=== Literature ===
No Lipstick in Lebanon is written by Paul Timblick and Fasika Sorssa, an Ethiopian former domestic worker who worked in Lebanon. The book is based on her experiences as a migrant domestic worker and violations she faced in her work and the challenging relationship between her and her employer.

=== Television ===
Al Mouaallima Wal Oustaz (The teacher and the professor) a Lebanese television series from the 1980s, featured the silent role of a migrant worker in a classroom for new migrants to the country.

=== Films and Documentaries ===
Beirut is a film by Rahel Zegeye, an Ethiopian domestic worker, which focuses on the situation for Ethiopian women working as domestic workers in Lebanon. The film is loosely based on Zegeye's encounters during her ten years in the country. The story begins when Hiwot, a former domestic worker who has left her employer's home to earn a living as a prostitute, searches for another woman who could work with her. Saba, another domestic worker, runs away from her employers and joins Hiwat. The film follows the story of how these women come into conflict with their friends who decide to stay with their employers despite the violations they face.

Makhdoumin (A Maid for Each) is a 2016 documentary film directed by Maher Abi Samra which explores the business of recruiting migrant domestic workers for Lebanese employers in Beirut. The documentary follows Zein, an agency owner who recruits and supplies domestic workers of Asian and African descent to work in Lebanese households. The documentary film won Best Muhr Non-Fiction Feature at the Muhr Awards 2016. The documentary also won the Peace Film Price at Berlinale 2016 and Best Film at Buenos Aires International Festival (BAFICI) as well as the Peace Prize by the German Heinrich Böll Foundation.

This is not paradise is an Italian documentary film directed by Lisa Tormena and Gaia Vianello, focusing on the Kafala system in Lebanon and the work of Lebanese NGO such as Kafa, Anti-racism Movement, Caritas Lebanon, Insan and Migrant Workers Task Force. Official selection at Al Jazeera International Documentary Film Festival 2015.

Maid in Lebanon is a documentary directed by Carol Mansour exploring the struggle of the domestic workers in Lebanon. In their own voices, the migrant workers tell their stories of rape, torture, physical and mental abuse. The documentary addresses the questions of why the workers migrate in the first place and why they return to the Middle East despite the suffering.

Maid for Sale is a documentary directed by Dima Al-Joundi highlighting the employment and living conditions of domestic workers in Lebanon.

=== Theater ===
Shebaik Lebaik is a play written by migrant workers and migrant domestic workers in Lebanon and performed.

Shouting Without A Listener is a play written, directed and produced by the creator of the film Beirut, Rahel Zegeye. In this play she investigates the lives of migrant workers in Lebanon exploring encounters with discrimination and exploitation but also love and life decisions.

=== Visual art ===
Beirut based multimedia journalist and filmmaker, Matthew Cassel produced a photography project named Unseen Lives: Migrant domestic workers in Lebanon in partnership with the KAFA (enough) Violence and Exploitation. The photographs depict the lives of women of Ethiopian, Filipino, Nigerian, Nepalese, Madagascan, and other nationalities who are working in Lebanon and domestic workers. As part of his photo project documenting the lives of foreign domestic workers, Cassel has also produced a selection of photographs of Miss Ethiopia in Lebanon, a beauty pageant organized by the Ethiopian community in Lebanon.

The comic strip Zina, created by Zina Mufarrij, attempts to offer a humorous critique of Lebanese society and includes the character of a migrant domestic worker named Coussouma. Coussouma A La Plage depicts a domestic work we are unable to see beneath the luggage they are carrying. The character of Coussouma is described as a diligent employee, who has lived in Lebanon for three years and takes care of the household daily chores for her 'Madame'.

Lebanese artist Tagreed Darghouth produced a piece entitled Fair & Lovely in 2010, a series of oil portraits of domestic maids.

== See also ==
- Migrant worker
- Economic migrant
- Migrant domestic workers
- Kafala system
- Migrant workers in the Gulf region
- Migrant workers in the United Arab Emirates
