= Pierre Jamjian =

Lebanese-Armenian actor (1949–2021)

- Փիեռ Չամիչեան
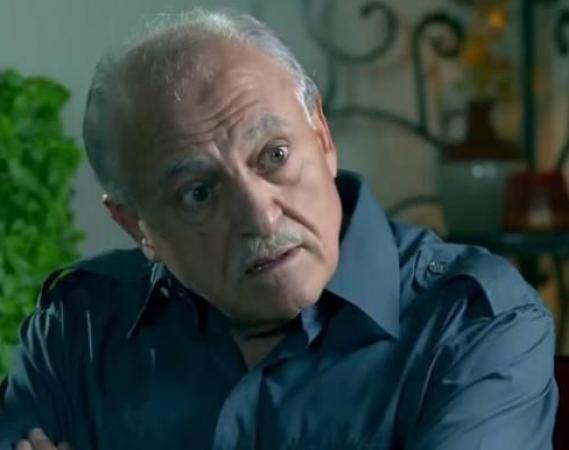
- Born: 1949; Jal el Dib
- Died: 21 October 2021 (aged 72); St. George Hospital, Beirut, Lebanon
- Citizenship: Lebanon
- Occupation: Actor
- Years active: 1973–2021

Pierre Jamjian (Armenian: Փիեռ Չամիչեան; 1949 – 21 October 2021) was a Lebanese-Armenian actor, who began his artistic career on stage during the early 70s, and then moved to television, where he became famous in Lebanon after participating with the artists Ibrahim Maraachli and Hend Abi Al-Lama in the comedy series The Teacher and the Professor in which he played the character “Piaro”.

== Early life ==
Jamjian was born in Jal El Dib, Metn in 1949, and studied at Al-Jawdah High School, where his acting talent appeared. He drew the attention of the artist Assi Rahbani, who saw him in one of the plays of the Social League in Jal El Dib, which gathered the talents of the school theater in the region, so he summoned him to represent with his band and in front of the singer Fairuz at the Piccadilly Theatre located on Hamra Street in Beirut. Jamjian continued his artistic career with Al-Rahbani and participated in the most prominent plays of that period with Ziad Al-Rahbani, such as: Nazl Al-Surour (1974), An American Long Film (1980) and Shi Fashil (1983).

== Career ==
Jamjian turned to acting on Lebanon TV (Télé Liban), appeared in episodes of the series Yasad Masaken with Adeeb Haddad (known as "Abu Melhem"). He also played the most prominent role in the comedy series The Teacher and the Professor, playing the role of Piaro. Later, Jamjian performed some plays, such as Piaro His Luck Zero (1987), and then Piaro Or No One in the 1990s. He also participated in series such as The Story of Hope, The Way, A Woman of Loss, If the Electricity Was Not Cut off and The Prestige as “Abu Issa”.

== Death ==
Jamjian died on 21 October 2021 in St. George Hospital in Beirut, after he was transferred there the previous night, when it was found that his lungs were full of fluid. He died at the age of 72.

== Television roles ==
=== Series ===
- Piaro in The teacher and the professor
- Abu Melhem in Yasad Masaken
- Abu Issa in Al-Hiba"00

== Theatrical works ==
- Nazl Al-Sourour (Happiness Hotel – 1974)
- An American Long Film (1980)
- Shi Fashel (Failure – 1983)
- Mays al Reem (1975)
- Petra (1977)
