= FDW (disambiguation) =

FDW may refer to:

- Fairfield County Airport (South Carolina), the FAA LID code FDW
- 342nd Fighter-Day Wing, an inactive United States Air Force wing
- Foreign domestic workers, engaged in a work relationship performing in or for a household or households
