= Leïla Karam =

Leila Karam (1928 – 2 December 2008) was a Lebanese actress. Her major contributions were in the 1970s and 1980s in many Lebanese and Egyptian movies, plays and TV series of Tele Liban.

== Career ==
Karam began her career in broadcast media in 1956, at Near East Radio. Soon after television came to Lebanon in 1959, she starred as the mother in the series Abou Melhem.

Her last role was as Carine Rizkallah's mother in Marte W Ana in 2000

== Personal life ==
Karam was married, and had one son. Her elder sister Nabila Karam was also actress. She died on 2 December 2008 in a hospital in Beirut after a long illness.

== Filmography ==
Film / Series Name	Year	Genre	Role	
Abou Melhem show		TV series	Um Melhem	Starring with Adeeb Haddad
Al akhrass		TV series		
Beirut bil Layl (Beirut by Night)		TV series		Hassan el Miliji
Al Nahr (The River)		TV series		
Ibrahim Afandi		TV series		
Captain Bob		TV series	Zarifeh	With Ibrahim Meraachli, Hind Abi-Llama
Al Mouaallima Wal Oustaz (The teacher and the professor)		TV series	Zarifeh	With Ibrahim Meraachli, Hind Abi-Llama
Al Bou'asa' (Les Misérables)		TV series		
Abou 'lmarajel		TV series		
Al Chareed		TV series		With Akram Al Ahmar
Fares w Njoud		TV series		
Hawl Ghourfati (Around my bedroom)		TV series		With Hind Abi-Llama
Allo, Hayete (Allo, My Love)		TV series		With Hind Abi-Llama and Abdel Majeed Majzoob
As Sarab		TV series		
Ghouroub		TV series		
Al Asira (The prisonier)	1980	TV series		
Eddouniya Heik (Life is like that)	1980	TV series	Wardeh	Mouhammad Chamel
Al Amir al Ahmar (The Red Prince)	1973	Play		
Mayss el Rim	1975	Play	Talji (Nehmen's Aunt)	Rahbani brothers
Al Mouamara moustamirra	1980	Play		Rahbani brothers
Bint al Haress (The Guardian's Daughter)	1967	Film		Rahbani brothers, Fairuz
Safar Barlik (The Exile)	1967	Film	Zahia	Rahbani brothers, Fairuz
Safrat El Ahlam (Dreams Journey)		Play		Elias Rahbani, Madonna Arnita
Nagham fi hayati (Melody in my life)	1975	Film		
Houbbi lazi la yamout (My never dying Love)	1983	Film		
Hamsat al shaytan (devils whisper)		Film		
West Beirut	1998	Film	Oum Walid, Brothel Madam	Ziad Doueiri

== Quotes ==
"They don't remember us except when we are dead, that is if they do, so why should we remember them or show our admiration."
