= Zahra Marwa =

- Born: Zahra Marwa
- Citizenship: Lebanese
- Occupations: Writer and poet
- Notable work: Paradise ready residence in life boot in batches

Zahra Marwa is a Lebanese poet and journalist. She has published three poetry collections: A Ready Paradise, Residence in Prelude, and Life in Installments. Marwa is a member of the Shahriad Cultural Group, a literary salon that hosts Lebanese and Arab poets on Hamra Street every Tuesday. Some of her poems have been translated into German.

The Lebanese poet and critic Michal Saade wrote a book about her work titled Zahra Marwa in Her Works "A Ready Paradise" and "Residence in Prelude": A Critical Constructive Study. Marwa also occasionally translates the works of renowned poets from French into Arabic.

== Early life and education ==
Zahra Marwa attended a convent school for girls, where she began writing journals at an early age. Over time, her writings developed into poetic texts. She later pursued a degree in business administration.

== Career ==
Zahra Marwa wrote her first poem following the death of one of her relatives, composing a poetic text expressing her grief over her father's death. At the time, she was eighteen years old. In a later press interview, she stated that writing helped her cope with her grief. The poem was later published in a cultural magazine.

Marwa published Life in Installments through the Iraqi Rawsem Press. The book is a collection of free verse and condensed poems that explore themes of absence, loss, and loneliness. It also raises philosophical reflections that encourage readers to contemplate simple aspects of life.

In 2012, the Arabic Press for Science published her poetry collection Residence in Prelude, consisting of around 80 pages. The collection features love poems that employ rich imagery to convey emotional depth. Marwa later stated that the book includes 67 prose and poetic texts, such as "Those Who Cross Over Have the Right to Reflection," "The Hour of Poem," "To the Road," "Taking His Glory," "Becoming Beautiful," "We Met," and "Limitless."

That same year, Marwa released A Ready Paradise through Al-Ghawoon Press. The 48-page work, often described as a hybrid between a short novel and a poetry collection, brings together a series of short poems connected through a unified narrative. The collection includes 37 pieces in prose and verse, such as "The Upside-Down Tree," "The Nullity and the Gold," "A Moon in My Hand," "A Hanging Leap," "A Little Man," "Labor," "The Nightmares of One Evening," and "A Safe."

One of Marwa's more recent works is Napoleon's Letters to Josephine, published by Rafedeen Press in 2021 as part of its "Letters Literature" series. The 312-page book explores love letters in world literature, focusing on the correspondence between Napoleon Bonaparte and Josephine de Beauharnais. Marwa translated these letters into Arabic and introduced Josephine—whose real name was Rose Tascher—to Arab readers. Josephine, a widow of a general executed during the French Revolution, escaped the guillotine with the help of influential friends and later married Napoleon. Marwa described the book as an exploration of a rare and profound literary form of correspondence that captures an exceptional human experience.

== Reviews ==
Marwa has stated that a great poet masters the manipulation of words and meanings and understands the art of weaving a poem—what she refers to as "entering the kitchen." She believes that a poet should accompany the poem through all its stages of creation and remain engaged with the poetic experiments of their time. She has also emphasized that poets should be sincere, passionate, and well-read, engaging with both poetry and contemporary criticism, as doing so can naturally develop their critical sensibility.

Marwa has expressed support for the role of e-books in promoting poets and their work. However, she has also cautioned against the risks of digital piracy, advising writers to research and take precautions to protect their intellectual property.

== Works ==
The following is a list of the main works by Lebanese poet and writer Zahra Marwa:

- A Ready Paradise
- Residence in Prelude
- Life in Installments
