= Migrant domestic workers =

Migrant domestic workers are (according to the International Labour Organization’s Convention No. 189 and the International Organization for Migration) any persons "moving to another country or region to better their material or social conditions and improve the prospect for themselves or their family," engaged in a work relationship performing "in or for a household or households."

Domestic work itself encompasses an array of tasks and services that vary depending on country, age, gender, ethnic background and migration status of the workers involved.

Prominent discussions on the topic include the status of workers, reasons behind the pursue in this labour, recruitment and employment practices in the field, and various measures being undertaken to change the conditions of domestic work among migrants.

== Migrant domestic workers in the world ==
The status of migrant domestic workers is unique in the field of labor, due to the site of their employment: the home. The domestic sphere, by definition, "is imagined as a place for private individuals, not political or indeed market actors." Due to their embeddedness in what can be considered the "private sphere", some analysts have gone so far as to equate domestic laborers with members of the employers’ families, a dynamic made all the more complex by these workers' status as migrants. Historically, they have not been regarded as the same form of labor as manufacturers or doctors. From the end of the Second World War until the mid-1980s, for instance, "most ILO Conventions explicitly excluded domestic workers from the protections afforded by most employment Conventions."

The lack of knowledge concerning the composition of this workforce has been attributed to this historical lack of attention and advocacy. Current estimates place the number of domestics anywhere between 53 and 100 million. The ILO, in 2010, projected the following distribution of domestic workers throughout the world:

Region	Domestic Workers	Percentage of women
Developed Countries	3 555 000	73%
Eastern Europe/CIS	595 000	67%
Asia/Pacific	21 467 000	81%
Latin America/Caribbean	19 593 000	92%
Africa	5 236 000	74%
Middle East	2 107 000	63%

Source: Domestic workers across the world: Global and regional statistics and the extent of legal protection, International Labour Organization. Geneva. 2013

Domestic work is a highly gendered profession. Globally, 83% of domestic workers are women, of whom a majority are women migrant workers. However, due, to "the heterogeneity, irregularity and invisibility of domestic and care work," statistics can never be comprehensive.

== Relationship with international migration ==
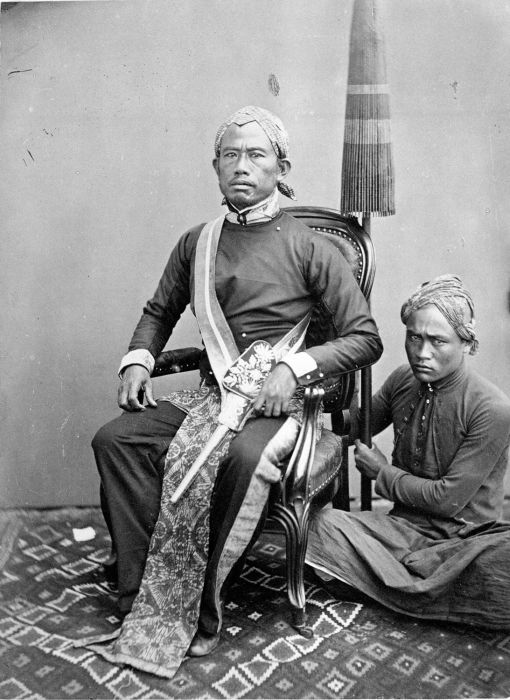
Aristocrat from Bandoeng with a servant sitting on the floor, Dutch East Indies, 1870s

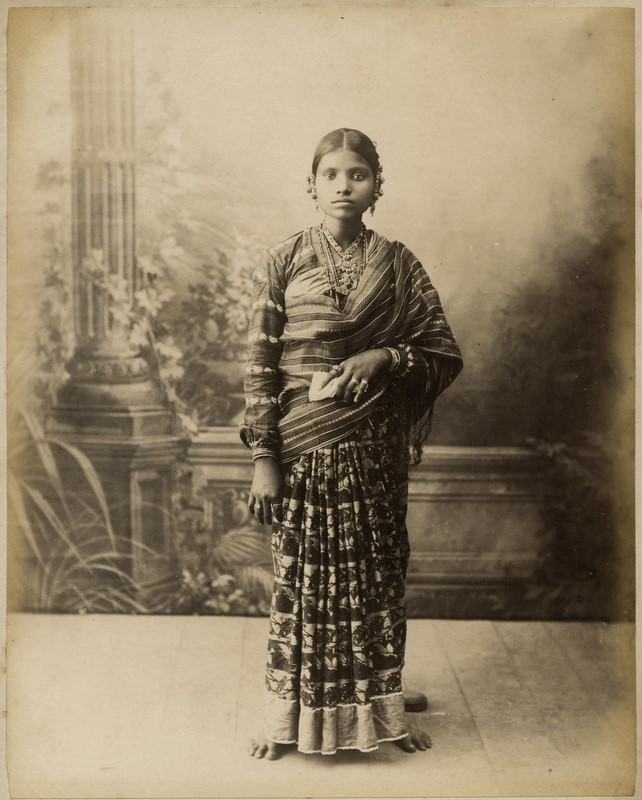
Goanese serving maid, c. 1880

The migration of domestic workers can lead to several different effects both on the countries that are sending workers abroad and countries that are receiving domestic workers from abroad. One particular relationship between countries sending workers and countries receiving workers is that the sending country can be filling gaps in labor shortages of the receiving country.

This relationship can be potentially beneficial for both countries involved because the demand for labor is being met and fulfilled by workers' demand for jobs. This relationship however can prove to be quite complicated and not always beneficial. When unemployment in a receiving country rises migrant domestic workers are not only no longer needed but their presence can be detrimental to domestic workers of that country.

When international migration began to flourish the assumed migrant worker was typically considered to be a man. What studies are now starting to show is that women are dominating large numbers of the international migration patterns by taking up large percentages of domestic workers that leave their home country in search for work as a domestic laborer in another country.

Women who migrate to take up work as domestic workers are motivated by different reasons and migrate to a variety of different outcomes. While for many women, domestic work abroad is the only opportunity to find work and provide an income for their families, domestic labor is a market they are forced to enter due to blocked mobility in their homelands.

Additionally, migrant domestic workers often have to face the stress of leaving family members behind in their home countries while they take up work abroad. Upward mobility is particularly difficult for migrant domestic workers because their opportunities are often limited by their illegal status putting a very definite limitation on the work that is available to them as well as their power to negotiate with employers

== Advocacy for migrant workers ==
Some argue that personal sacrifices of domestic workers has helped to underpin economic and social development globally. Ariel Salleh's article "Ecological Debt: Embodied Debt", defines embodied debt as "debt owed by the Global North and Global South to the 'reproductive workers' who produce and maintain the new labour force." According to the International Labour Organization (ILO), women constitute 80% of domestic workers.

The substantially high percentage of women in domestic work some argue results from this sector's association with motherhood, leading to an assumption that domestic work is by nature the work of females. In support, some argue that because domestic work occurs within the private sphere, which is seen as inherently feminine. This argument goes that the constructed link between domestic work and femininity carries the implication that it is often referred to as 'domestic help,' and that domestic workers are referred to as 'nannies' or 'maids.' At least one author has argued that use of language compounded with the association with domestic work with femininities contributes to the exclusion of domestic work from the majority of national labour laws.

Due to a lack of economic opportunity in the Global South, many women with families leave their countries of origin and their own families to pursue work in the Global North. When they arrive in their country of destination, their work often entails caring for another family (including children and the elderly). Domestic workers often migrate to financially support their immediate family, extended family, and even other members of their community. While enduring dangerous and demeaning working and living conditions in the North, the majority of their wages are remitted to their countries of origin.

An additional argument has been made that because their work takes place within the private sphere, they are often rendered invisible and employers are able to withhold their travel documents, confining them to their employers' home and inhibiting their access to legal redress. Those making this argument assert that the result of what they refer to as a power dynamic and an asserted lack of labour rights, is that domestic workers are often forbidden to contact their families and often go months, years, and even decades without seeing their families, whose lives their remittances are supporting.

Further, it has been argued that their ability to fill labour shortages and accept positions within the reproductive labour force that citizens of their host countries would reject underpins the development of the global capitalist system, Simultaneously, and that they are enabling the beneficiaries of their remittances in the South to ascend the social ladder. To some, these arguments lead to a conclusion that both circumstances in the North and South constitute embodied debt through the improvement of one's life at the expense of another's hardship, and that the labour of such workers is too often not seen as work, due to the association of their gendered bodies with reproductive labour.

However, on June 17, 2011, after 70 years of lobbying by civil society groups, the ILO adopted a convention with the aim of protecting and empowering domestic workers. Much of lobbying that contributed toward the ratification of ILO C189 was done by domestic workers groups, demonstrating that they are not merely victims but agents of change. That only two labour receiving countries have ratified the convention has been argued by some to demonstrates the reluctance of governments to acknowledge what such advocates see as a debt owed by society to such workers and to repay that perceived debt.

Such advocates assert that the ratification and enforcement of ILO C189 would mean that migrant domestic workers would enjoy the same labour rights as other more 'masculine' fields as well as the citizens of their destination countries. An incomplete list of basic rights guaranteed by ILO C189 under Article 7 includes: maximum working hours; fixed minimum wages; paid leave; provision of food and accommodation; and weekly rest periods. Guaranteeing these rights to migrant domestic workers would not constitute repayment the embodied debt owed to them, but they are entitled to these rights as they are both workers and human beings.

== Regulations and conventions ==
The fact that domestic work is often relegated to the private sphere, coupled with the sometimes-illegal status of these migrants, has created a sparse regulatory environment. As cited above, for example, the ILO had purposefully excluded domestic workers from their labor regulations. However, increasing advocacy, coupled with the increasingly transnational element of domestic work prompted the drafting of Convention 189, "Domestic Workers Convention, 2011," which mandated rest hours, a minimum wage, some freedom of movement, a clearly worded working contract before migrating, and a right to live outside of their workplace.

Though this convention passed with a majority of votes, it has thus far only been ratified by Uruguay and the Philippines, both net sending countries. The ILO is not the only international organization attempting to regulate this field, however. The European Parliament drafted a resolution, submitted to the European Commission, calling for domestics’ inclusion in future labour legislation, to take into account their unique work environment, and give training, social security, and set work hours to domestic workers. This has yet to be adopted or change international regulation, though. As such, the regulation of migrant domestic labor is left to individual states, which, as will be examined, has led to abuses.

== Drivers for demand and supply for migrant domestic workers ==
=== Supply ===
Starting in the mid-19th century, the employment of a domestic worker became a status symbol for bourgeois households and a civilizing mission to young female servants coming from the countryside in search for education, lodging and income. The character of this migration changed around the start of the 20th century, when maids were recruited to work overseas as part of racial purity policies, which involved providing suitable brides for the male settlers.

Changes in roles and social aspirations of middle-class women are perceived to have intensified the admission of women into waged work. From an economic perspective, freeing these middle and upper-class women from household chores allowed them to engage in more productive activities; families’ real income thus increases along with their general welfare.

==== Escaping hardship ====
Women migrating into private households thousands of miles away from their country of origin are motivated to do so by the search for better salaries and also that their prospects will improve in the destination countries. These women are frequently escaping violence, war, corruption, natural disasters and long-term economic instabilities or poverty in general.

==== Remittances ====
Because these workers' remittances are a source of revenues for their countries of origin, some countries actively encourage their female workers to migrate abroad for domestic work as a key development strategy, offsetting unemployment problems, while growing the economy through accumulating foreign-exchange reserves. Migrant domestic workers tend to replace the native peers of the host country, and displace them towards other (usually more productive) activities.

==== Brain waste ====
Migrant domestic workers are, on average, better educated than their domestically sourced counterparts. Undocumented migrants can become domestic workers, not only due to demand but also to a lack of access to the formal labor market, language barriers, a lack of social capital (networks), or technical barriers that impede their labor market integration. Some of these workers even hold advanced degrees, but, as their educational credentials are not accepted in the host country, or they are not legally qualified to work in their field, they are not able to find work that would comply with their level of education. The status afforded to highly educated migrants, however, is often more sought after, especially in the field of child care, as both an asset and a symbol of status for the employer.

Nevertheless, the insufficiency of state-supported care facilities under the auspices of the welfare state and an increasingly aging population created a demand for domestic work, particularly in OECD countries. This so-called ‘care crisis’ has been one of the motors of the feminization of migration, as it has opened up labor opportunities for women in the area of care work.

=== Demand ===
==== Cost and flexibility ====
Institutional arrangements contribute to making migrant domestic workers cost less to employers than their native counterparts. Due to the largely undocumented or informal nature of their employment, migrants are not automatically entitled to social benefits(health care, etc.), reproductive, and family rights (e.g., family unification). In countries such as Malaysia, even through formal employment arrangements, employers are not required to pay minimum wages to migrant workers. This legal vulnerability found in the case of undocumented immigrants is also often cited as a reason for non-payment for services provided.

In terms of working conditions, research on the perception of employers in the UK found that migrants were seen to be more likely to live in and perceived as more ‘flexible’ both in terms of tasks performed and of working hours, another motive for hiring this type of worker. Additionally, in case of formal, legal arrangements, some immigration law gives the employers control over workers’ mobility during the period of the contract; this is seen as an offset to the fact that domestic workers in that labor market typically experience high turnover.

==== Discipline and "loyalty" ====
Migrant domestic workers tend to shy away from authorities and social services, due in some part to their status as undocumented and mostly women. Additionally, research has shown that the perception exists on the part of the workers that they are being afforded some form of protection by their employers, which, thus, demands a projection of gratitude and courtesy in their attitude. This is exemplified by the fact that, in some cases, domestic work may be considered a viable alternative to sex work for a female illegal immigrant.

The pressure to send remittances from abroad to the source country is felt more strongly by these women, who tend to remit a greater proportion of their income than their male counterparts. Their wages are also used to pay back recruitment agencies and cover basic costs of family members in their home communities, including their health care and education. This, in a way, binds them to their jobs and is a disincentive to repatriate or quit. When they are required to be officially sponsored, such as in the Kafala system of some Middle Eastern countries, the migrant domestic worker becomes legally and economically bound to their sponsor, creating an environment in which these particular workers are encouraged to be more loyal and more under the control of their employer.

==== Racial stereotypes of "ideal" domestic workers ====
Many individual employers reportedly express a preference for domestic workers with (assumed or real) behavioural, cultural, linguistic or religious traits thought to influence the quality of service provided. Research of the perceptions of employers have shown that racial stereotypes identify certain nationalities as ideal domestic workers. In the United States, for instance, Mexican maids and Peruvian nannies are seen as ‘submissive’ workers and ‘natural mothers’ respectively. These perceptions play out in the levels of compensation for these workers. In the United Arab Emirates, for instance, a college-educated domestic worker from the Philippines is seen as more of a status symbol and earns significantly more than her equally skilled counterpart from India; this disparity is attributed in the literature to racial and socioeconomic assumptions on the part of employers.

== Recruitment of migrant domestic workers ==
=== East ===
The high demand for foreign domestic workers in the Arab states has created a flourishing and profitable market for private employment agencies and informal brokers that supply labour from many countries, mainly Asian and African source countries. Statistics from the International Federation of Private Employment Agencies (CIETT) show that 34 per cent of the world’s 72,000 private employment agencies are based in the Asia-Pacific region and 8 percent in Africa, though most of these agencies are temporary staffing agencies that are not involved in cross-border migration. Local recruiters trawl through villages and portray pictures of promising working environment, success and profitable income in urban centers or rich countries abroad. They have been known to promise recruits income to help them build in their native countries or, for younger recruits, the opportunity to continue their education abroad. Labor recruiters and agencies undergo scant monitoring, and in most countries, few regulations exist to control the recruitment fees charged to workers. Private recruitment agencies orchestrate much of the migration process from pre-departure to the return. They provide information, financial and logistical support; however, migrant domestic workers’ dependence on private agencies for so many services create many opportunities for exploitation and abuse.

According to International Labour Organization, there exist frequent irregularities concerning these intermediaries (i.e., recruiters and agents in sending and receiving countries). Therefore, the inconsistencies, between regulations in source and destination countries, as well as loopholes in existing laws and regulations create opportunities for unscrupulous agencies to exploit the system. Intermediaries who provide services to facilitate the migration process have been indicated to be important perpetrators of exploitation of women migrant workers. Taking advantage of migrants’ desperation to find work, agents and employers have been accused of shifting the burden of recruitment fees, including airfare, visas, and administrative fees, on to the workers themselves, while employers pay a nominal fee. This creates a heavy debt burden on international migrant domestic workers. Many Indonesian domestic workers migrating to Persian Gulf countries take out loans from local moneylenders with interest rates as high as 100 percent to pay these fees, while those traveling to Asia typically use a "fly now, pay later" scheme. For example, in Singapore and Hong Kong, Indonesian migrant domestic workers often spend up to 10 months out of a two-year contract without a salary, since they must turn over these wages to repay their recruitment fees. The resulting financial pressure makes it difficult for workers to report abuse for fear of losing their jobs and having no way to pay off their debts. Experience has shown that bans on the recruitment and deployment of migrant workers, which often affect domestic workers disproportionally, are difficult to enforce and drive the recruitment process further underground. In addition, the extravagant fees charged by recruiting agencies and the weak legal system in the countries in question establish the path for non-registered recruiters and brokers to engage in trafficking of migrants for domestic work.

==== Kafala system ====
In the Arab countries, recruiters match domestic workers with their employers through the kafala system or sponsorship system. This system binds domestic workers’ visa and legal status directly to a kafl (or sponsor), who maintains control over her mobility for the duration of her stay in the host country. Consequently, migrant domestic workers cannot change their place of employment without obtaining prior approval from their employer-sponsor. The kafala system over the years has been credited with the "privatization of regional migration", creating unequal working conditions and violations of rights of migrant domestic workers. In some places, like the UAE, the government or the media does not show the full picture. For example, labour camps in Dubai, UAE do not have proper conditions for the workers and if they protest they can be deported if they are foreigners. In the 1990s, Sarah Balabagan a foreign domestic worker was sparred the death penalty, after it was established that she killed her abusive employer to protect herself.

=== West ===
In the Western world, the employment of migrant domestic workers differs from the predominant hiring and recruiting trends in the East. In Europe, migration has followed a pattern from East to West, that is from Eastern Europe to Western, Southern and Northern Europe and from South to North, from Latin America, Asia and Africa to the EU countries. The demand for migrant domestic workers has been credited to the welfare system of these countries. In order to enable female nationals to ‘reconcile’ care work and a working life, some European states have installed a quota system for the recruitment of domestic workers (Spain, Italy, Greece), which allows employers to recruit workers from abroad under specific criteria, or they have opened their borders to these workers (Britain and Ireland with the domestic worker visa). Others, such as Germany, the Nordic States, and the Netherlands, have hardly acknowledged the need for migrant domestic workers, let alone included this need in their managed migration policies. United States and Canada have adopted migrant programs such as Immigration Reform and Control Act of 1986 IRCA and Live-In Caregiver program, respectively, in order to facilitate the employment of migrant domestic workers.

==== Informal economy ====
The high demand for domestic care, along with different social welfare structures, together with restrictive migration policies, has led to an extensive informal domestic services market with a high percentage of undocumented foreign workers in Western countries. For this reason, despite the IRCA's intent to limit illegal migration, it has been accused of promoting the undocumented immigration of women. The employment of domestic migrant workers in these countries is known to be based on social capital. There are three entrance doors through which women enter the domestic sector. First, there is the "co-Optation modality" whereby women channel each other into each other into employment positions, by mainly relying from the moment of arrival on social networks made-up of family members, friends and/or acquaintances who connect them with potential employers in the country. Second, there is "freelance domestic worker" by building her own clientele through newspapers and magazines job offers, distributing cards offering services in residential areas. Finally, there is the "communitarian social network", which unlike co-Optation, is formed after migration. Religious networks (i.e., churches) are extremely important in network-building of many female immigrants. This entrance door is rarely used upon arrival as it requires the formation of new contacts amongst immigrants.

== Vulnerability to abuse ==
Although the working conditions of migrant domestic workers are also dependent on regional and country specific factors, several global commonalities render these workers vulnerable to abuse.

=== Risks of abuse during recruitment and travel ===
Recruitment agencies and other intermediaries often do not inform migrant domestic workers about their rights in their future employment and about the mechanisms available to them in order to report abuse. Advertising non-existent domestic jobs and forcing migrants to pay high fees are daily risks migrant domestic workers face. In transit to the country of employment, female workers are particularly vulnerable to physical and sexual harassment and abuse.

=== Social isolation ===
Regardless of their country of employment, migrant domestic workers experience social isolation from the local community, as well as from their home community, resulting from the move to a different country. Since they typically leave their families behind, migrant domestic workers are separated physically from their social network, including their children and close relatives, which contributes to their social isolation. The language and cultural barriers further complicate this transition and make it difficult for these workers to connect with the local population. Due to the language barrier, migrant domestic workers know little to nothing about the local laws to protect themselves from abuse in the work place. This prevents them from raising awareness about their working conditions and from forming collective action.

=== Negative perceptions of migrant domestic workers ===
In addition to their social isolation, the international community often negatively characterizes these workers and their profession as culturally inferior. In many countries, migrant domestic workers have a reputation for being "unskilled, low-end and expendable," which contributes to their vulnerability to abuse and exploitation. Gender stereotypes and bias also add to their negative perception, particularly in the case of female domestic migrant workers who experience "disadvantages arising from their gender and the low social status assigned to domestic work." Discrimination is not only limited to gender, but also extends to race, class and ethnicity.

=== Working conditions ===
Migrant domestic workers’ working conditions further exacerbate their exposure to abuse, which largely arises out of their informal status in the economy. Since their work primarily takes place in private households, they are invisible from the formal labor structures, hidden from the public. As a result, they cannot defend their rights and unions cannot represent them. The informal nature of domestic work, often results in exploitative and harsh forms of labor, exposing these workers to human rights abuses.

Due to poor – in many cases none – regulation, migrant domestic workers face "excessive hours, physical and sexual abuse, forced labor and confinement." In many countries, this also includes foregoing wages and paying debt bondage. Bonded labor occurs when the migrant domestic worker is required to pay off transportation and recruitment costs, as well as agent commission fees. According to the ILO, 20.9 million persons work as forced labor in the world, of which domestic work represents the biggest proportion, affecting migrant domestic workers around the world. In some countries, these migrants work under slavery-like conditions, trapping them in their employment, and they can be susceptible to food deprivation and, in extreme cases, even death.

Even when the workers are paid, it is not always sufficient to provide for themselves and their families. Confinement and restrictions on their freedom of movement because of their harsh working conditions also contribute to their social isolation and their further exposure to abuse. Since migrant domestic workers have little to no opportunity to demand better working conditions through unions and legal protection, they often receive few, if any, social benefits. This includes insufficient rest time and little to no opportunities to visit their relatives during medical emergencies, and no pension.

=== Dependency on the employer ===
Migrant domestic workers can become extremely dependent on their employers through all of the aforementioned risks. In many cases, employers will withhold their immigration papers and confiscate their passports, which adds to their dependency and helplessness. This makes it difficult for migrant domestic workers to contact law enforcement officials in order to report abusive working conditions. Additionally, "the absence of work contracts and the fact that in many countries domestic employment is not recognized in labor legislation allows employers to impose working conditions unilaterally." Employers frequently consider their migrant domestic workers as their property or do not treat them as "proper" employees. Sometimes their place of work is also their shelter, making migrant domestic workers dependent on their employers.

=== Lasting effects of abuse ===
Even when migrant domestic workers return to their native countries, abuse experienced during their domestic employment abroad can have lasting effects. Workers often do not have access to support mechanisms and do not have the possibility to seek legal counsel due to their informal status during their period of employment.

== Improving the conditions of migrant domestic workers ==
=== Challenges to collective action ===
Migrant domestic workers, due to the nature of their work and to their status as migrants, or irregular migrants, are subject to a number of challenges that prevent collective action and claims for rights. The same factors that make migrant domestic workers vulnerable to abuse also prevent them from developing social networks and coordinating action. Moreover, domestic workers more generally cannot employ tactics used by other workers in organizations, such as strike action, if they live in their employer’s home.

Beyond these structural issues, states are also partially responsible for preventing collective action, with some countries imposing limitations on movement and organization. In fact domestic migrant workers are prohibited from creating or joining trade unions in a number of countries around the world. (Note: Countries where migrant workers are prohibited from creating or joining trade unions include Malaysia, Singapore, Bangladesh, Thailand, and those in the Middle East) Non-governmental organization (NGO) activity has also been constrained by state action, with barriers to registration or prohibition of "political activity."

=== Efforts by intergovernmental and non-governmental organizations ===
International organizations have helped raise awareness about the plight of migrant domestic workers by issuing reports, launching programs and discussing issues surrounding migrant domestic work.

The International Labour Organization (ILO) has stressed the importance of legal standards for workers and migrants. It has more specifically addressed states’ lack of protection for migrant domestic workers during its June 2004 Congress and during a High-Level Panel Discussion in 2013. The ILO has also launched the Global Action Programme on Migrant Domestic Workers and their Families, undertaken studies in and guidelines for foreign domestic workers in specific countries (Note: Countries for which studies were undertaken and guidelines prepared by the ILO include Lebanon, Bahrain, Kuwait and the United Arab Emirates) and published a report making note that female migrant workers constituted the main demographics in the sector of domestic work.

Other United Nations agencies have addressed migrant domestic work, with the United Nations Development Fund for Women (UNIFEM) attempting to facilitate dialogue between countries (Note: UNIFEM has facilitated dialogue between countries such as Jordan with Indonesia and the Philippines) to establish agreements that recognize migrant workers’ rights protection, and the United Nations Population Fund (UNFPA) releasing a report highlighting the gendered aspects of migration.

In terms of efforts to address the problem of private recruitment, the International Confederation of Private Employment Agencies, or Ciett, has created standards for recruitment in its code of conduct that are consistent with the ILO's Convention 181. Ciett's code reaches 47 national federations of private employment agencies and 8 of the largest staffing companies worldwide.

Collaborative works have also been published, including a manual by the International Domestic Workers Network and the ILO, geared to both national and migration domestic workers in Asia and the Pacific, and a report by Human Rights Watch, along with the International Domestic Workers’ Network and The International Trade Union Confederation.

=== Strategies by civil society to address issues faced by migrant domestic workers ===
Advocacy efforts have evolved from fighting to "recognize the position of paid domestic workers" to addressing work conditions and forms of abuse. Through time, a number of strategies have been used by international and civil society organizations in the hopes of improving the conditions surrounding migrant domestic work. These have included conventional means of mobilizing, such as rallies, protests and public campaigns to raise awareness or improve migrant domestic workers’ conditions. Lobbying, at both the national and supranational levels to modify laws (Note: Lobbying at national and supranational levels was done by Waling Waling in the UK and Europe) or by trade unions attempting to change the irregular status of migrant domestic workers has been used as a tactic. Civil society has also played a role in negotiating international legislation such as the International Labour Organization’s Domestic Worker Convention.

Beyond these public mobilizations and lobbying efforts for change, awareness raising has also been used as a strategy, serving in some cases to transform the public view on migrant domestic workers with the hope of stigmatizing abuse against and encouraging respect toward migrant domestic workers at the national level. (Note: Transient Workers Count Too (TWC2) has notably encouraged respect toward migrant domestic workers in Singapore) Educational efforts have also been used to inform women of their rights in countries where laws outlining employers’ obligations do exist. Due to the difficulties in mobilizing domestic workers, initiatives to raise awareness and inform migrant workers of their rights has not always been undertaken in institutionalized manners, but rather through informal means, such as planned encounters in public spaces that migrant domestic workers are known to frequent.

Language and discourse represent another component in advocacy efforts for migrant domestic workers. Certain organizations and institutions, (Note: Organizations and institutions include the ILO, NGOs such as Waling Waling, and the European Parliament) have, for example, taken the approach of promoting social and economic benefits of domestic work by migrants to private household and society at large. Groups have also employed women’s rights, workers’ rights and human rights language in their discourse. Moreover, groups addressing migrant domestic workers have tied abuse against migrant domestic workers at the national level to campaigns against abuse at the global level, to wider issues of abuse against women more generally, (Note: The TWC2 tied abuse against migrant domestic workers at the national level to campaigns against abuse at that global level with its White Ribbon Campaign) to human trafficking and domestic slavery, and to neoliberal globalization. Migrant domestic groups have also created coalitions with other organizations such as feminist groups, labor groups, groups for immigrant rights, (Note: Migrant domestic groups in Canada created coalitions with such groups) religious, human rights organizations, and trade unions. (Note: Waling Waling established coalitions with religious and human rights organizations) In fact, given these domestic workers come from abroad, there were a number of "cross-border alliances" created. (Note: Transnational and international networks and movements include Kalyaan, Migrante International, the Asian Domestic Workers’ Union, RESPECT, Women in Informal Employment: Globalizing and Organizing)

While women’s rights has been alluded to in some advocacy initiatives and that "cross-border exchanges strengthened the momentum in the development of transnational advocacy of worker rights as a gender-based concern," the intersection between migrant domestic work and gender in advocacy has not been consistent. Some organizations may consider themselves "feminist" (Note: The Women's Aid Organization in Malaysia considers itself feminist) or emphasize the gender dimension of their work, while others may not wish to associate migrant domestic workers’ with feminist issues. (Note: The Association of Women for Action and Research (AWARE) in Singapore did not wish to explicitly associate its position with feminism)

Given that the nature of domestic work poses challenges in mobilizing large groups of migrant workers, other tactics have been used to cater to and improve the situation of these migrants. These strategies have included providing support and services to these workers, with groups offering shelter, food, clothing, legal advice and assistance, as well as counselling. (Note: Counselling could involve providing guidance on how to undertake negotiations with the employer) These groups have additionally been required to tailor their human resources and materials in order to ensure accessibility by communicating in a language understood by these foreign employees.

=== Resistance and agency by migrant domestic workers ===
Despite the challenges to collective action and advocacy, some works have shown that migrant domestic workers do communicate with and inform each other as well as engage in forms of resistance against their employers. During their time off work, migrant domestic workers "reclaim their identities" through their attire and can ridicule their employers in their absence. They also find ways to communicate with others and as such "attempt to build communities" or learn about ways to improve their own working conditions by making use of information and communication technology or by undertaking discussions from their balcony with passersby and domestic workers from neighbouring apartments. (Note: Balcony talks notably take place in Lebanon)

Some domestic workers invest efforts to improve their own welfare or further challenge their employers’ authority by using emotion to capitalize on their employers’ guilt and sympathy for monetary gain, refusing to participate in "extracurricular work" such as family dinners, emphasizing "status similarity" between themselves and their employers, or refusing to accept statements by their employer that could be offensive to migrant domestic workers. Resistance can be found in ordinary activities such as eating a croissant in front of her employer but also by attending and organising political rallies and engaging in activism.

=== Best practices ===
In addressing issues faced by migrant domestic workers, some countries have ratified the Domestic Workers Convention or have adapted their national legislations by implementing minimum rest requirements or wages. Country-specific initiatives have also been introduced. These have included a Code of Conduct in Lebanon for recruiting migrant domestic workers, subsidies for assistance offered to migrant workers in Taiwan, or mandating certain government agencies with the task of overseeing the treatment of their nationals working as domestic workers in other countries, as it was done in the Philippines. Finally, there are governments, notably in Europe, which allow for migrant domestic workers to join or start trade unions.

== See also ==
- Care work
- Convention on domestic workers
- Foreign domestic helpers in Hong Kong
- Domestic violence
- Domestic worker
- Migrant worker
- Modern Slavery Act 2015
- Women migrant workers from developing countries
- Violence against women
- International migration
- Immigration
- Emigration
- Illegal immigration
- Immigration policy
- Human trafficking
- Informal sector
- Labor rights
- Labour inspectorate
- Human rights
- Labour law
- Feminist economics
- Economic development
- Social development
- Remittance
- Migrant domestic workers in Lebanon
- Indonesian migrant worker
- Overseas Filipino Worker
