= Hamra Street =

Street in Beirut, Lebanon

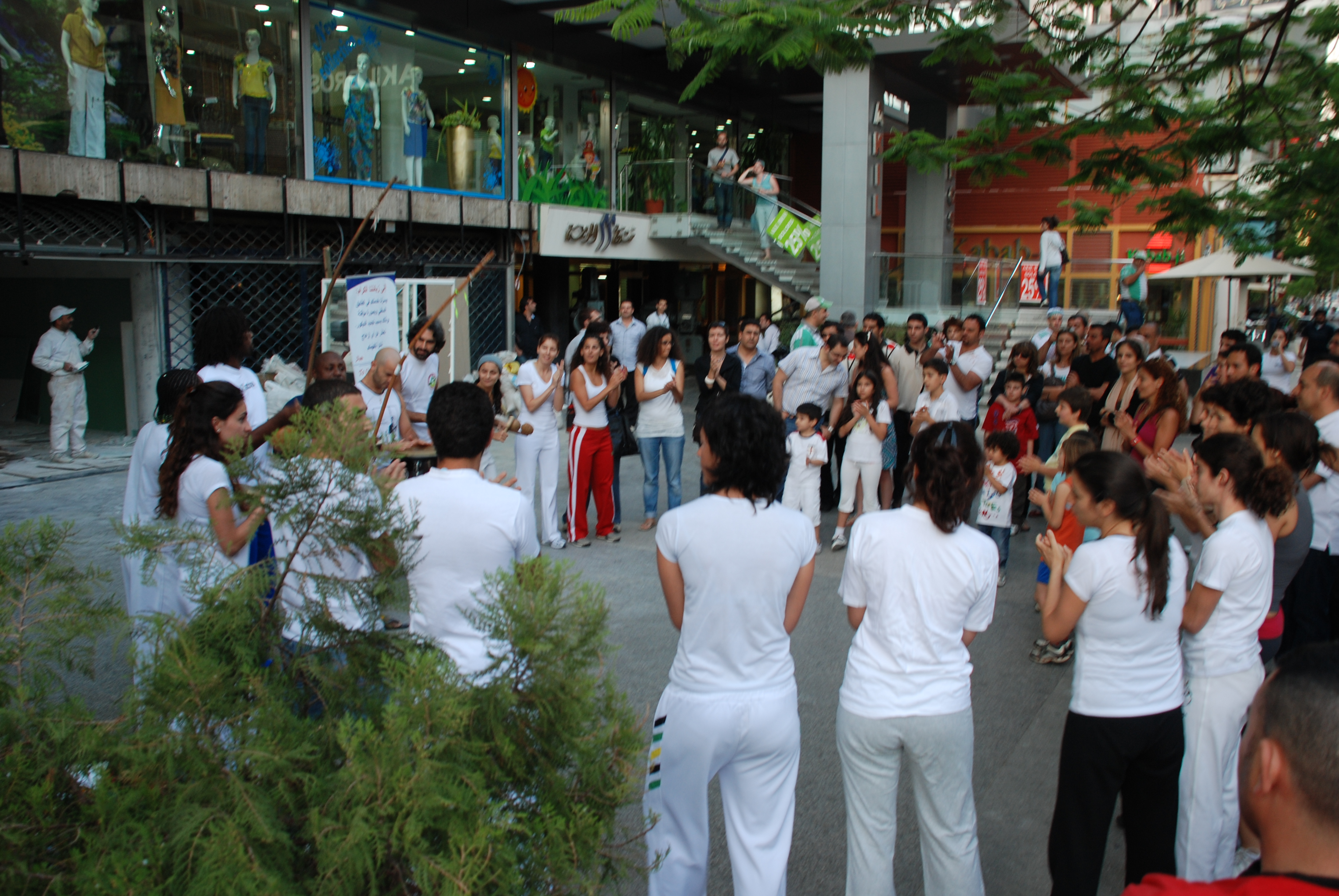
Streetlife in Hamra street, Beirut

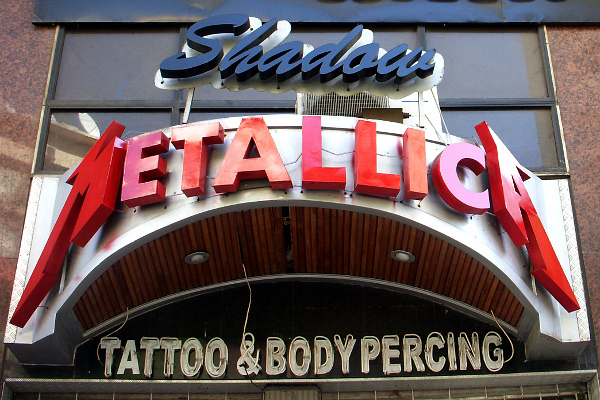
Tattoo and body piercing shop in Hamra

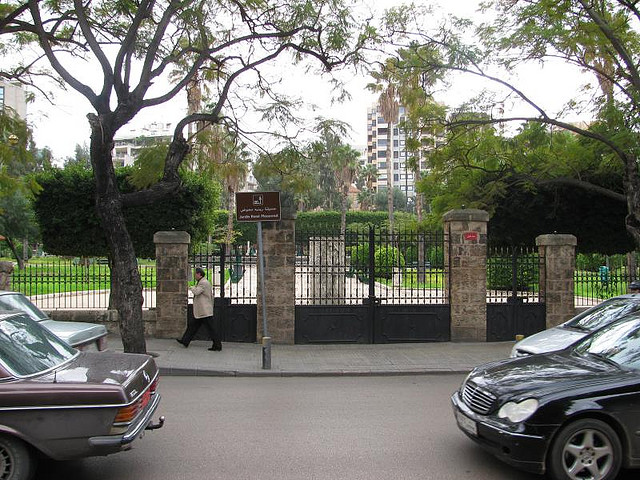
Entrance to René Moawad Garden on Rue Spears, walking distance from Hamra Street

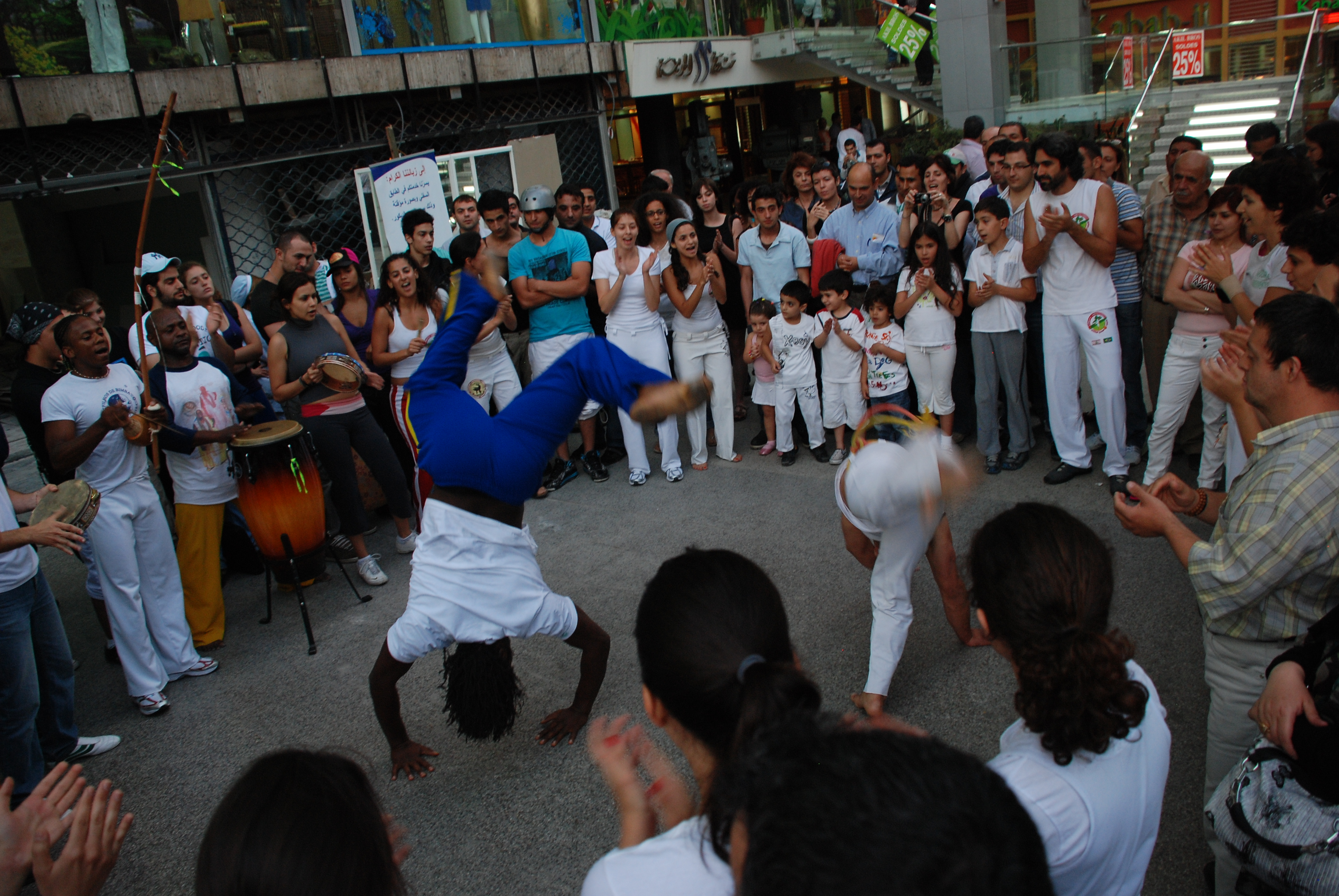
Street performers in the Hamra festival

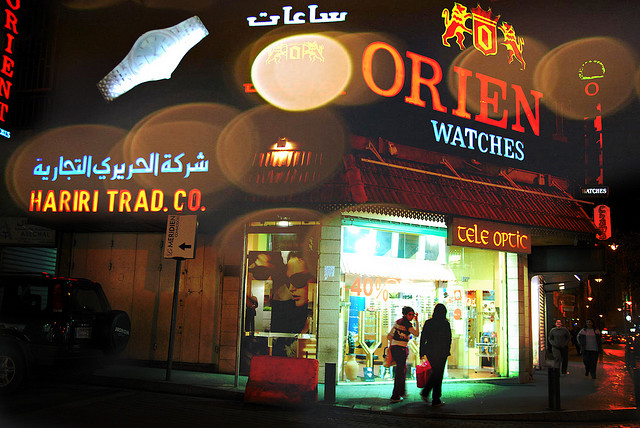
Neon lights decorate Hamra Street

Hamra Street or Rue Hamra (Arabic: شارع الحمراء) is one of the main streets of the city of Beirut, Lebanon, and one of the main economic and diplomatic hubs of Beirut. It is located in the neighborhood of the same name, Hamra. Its technical name is Rue 31. Due to the numerous sidewalk cafes and theatres, Hamra Street was the centre of intellectual activity in Beirut during the 1960s and 1970s. Hamra Street was known as Beirut's Champs Elysées, as it was frequented by tourists all year round. Before 1975, Hamra Street and the surrounding district was known as Beirut's trendiest.

Hamra no longer functions as the cosmopolitan bastion of sectarian Lebanon. The Lebanese Civil War and the ensuing government regulation that enforced rent control on all of the buildings removed the neighborhood's elite, pre-war cachet. In the post-war period it has arguably been eclipsed by Rue Monot in Ashrafieh, Rue Gouraud in Gemmayzeh, Rue Verdun, and downtown area. In the mid 1990s, the Municipality of Beirut gave a facelift to the street to reattract tourists all year round.

Today it is a commercial district with universities (such as: American University of Beirut, Lebanese American University, and Haigazian University), hotels, furnished apartments, libraries, restaurants and coffee shops, with "78 Street" (commonly known as "the Alleyway") being Hamra's main pubbing and clubbing hub.

== Geography ==
Hamra Street runs east-west, connecting Beirut Central District with the Ras Beirut neighborhoods. The street begins at the intersection of Rue de Rome and runs west until the intersection of Rue Sadat.

== Demographics ==
Los Angeles Times journalist and Pulitzer Prize winner Borzou Daragahi described the street as a bastion of liberalism [that] embraces multiple religions and political views; Hamra Street is an amalgam of all of Lebanon's religious groups, including Sunnis, Maronites, Melkites, Greek Orthodox Christians, Druze, and Shias.

Hamra, however, remains Lebanon's secular haven, melting pot for free thinkers and the least religiously affiliated area around Beirut as the area hosts a limited number of churches and mosques.

== Economy ==
It hosts a number of western chains (including Caribou Coffee, Costa Coffee and Starbucks), as well as local shops and restaurants. The appropriately named Cafe Hamra is a restaurant celebrating the historic street with an old street graffiti decor and international and Lebanese food as well as hookah smoking. Its main landmark is the Crowne Plaza.

Before the Lebanese civil war, Hamra Street was known as Beirut's "Champs Elysées" as it was frequented by tourists all year round. Beirut's Piccadilly Theatre was one of the major theaters in the Middle East.

Hamra no longer functions as the cosmopolitan bastion of sectarian Lebanon. The Lebanese civil war and the ensuing government regulation that enforced rent control on all of the buildings removed the neighborhood's elite, pre-war cachet. However, the neighborhood remains profitable because of:

1. the historical significance of the neighborhood;
2. the attraction of "authentic" Beirut;
3. the historic Hamra red light / supernightclub district, and the present acceptability of opening pubs, bars, and public cafes that serve alcohol in the district;
4. the locations of the Lebanese Central Bank (Banque Du Liban), private banks, major newspapers (As-Safir, the wartime and pre-war headquarters of An-Nahar, and the near neighbors Al-Akhbar and Al-Mustaqbal), and Lebanese government ministries (including the Ministries of Interior, Information, Tourism, and Economy and Trade), which have existed in Hamra since before the civil war;
5. the proximity and economic focal points of four of Lebanon's most significant universities: the American University of Beirut, the Lebanese American University, and Haigazian University.
6. the commercial scene in Hamra St.

Although it has yet to revive fully its pre-war legacy, Hamra Street has undergone many renovations. While it is no longer the nightlife and commercial center of Beirut, it has become one of many pocket areas and streets scattered throughout the city.

== Hamra Street Festival ==
Hamra Streets Festival is launched in the autumn of each year under the patronage of the Prime Minister. Its aim is to exhibit the cultural and artistic diversity of Lebanon in general and Hamra Street in particular. The festival has encompassed a number of activities. A variety of professional musicians perform after 8:30 p.m. each night while Amateurs reign the stages during the day. The Inauguration & Carnival Parade includes Carnival Float (Char de Carnaval), Dancing Groups, Zaffee loubnaniyya, Harley Davidson Owners HOG, The Beirut Orchestra, University Clubs Parade, Firemen, Croix Rouge Libanaise, Fuel Tankers. More Activities:

- Promotional offers from Hamra Streets Shops.
- Biggest concert in Lebanon on three stages; around 40 local professional groups were announced from Rock, Blues, RAP, Electro, Jazz, Fusion, Oriental.
- Arts and Crafts Stands: Artists and Amateurs will get a chance to show their works.
- NGO and Awareness Stands: Will be present.
- Photography and Paintings Exhibitions in all the streets.
- Short Films Screenings in zawareebs of Hamra: Short Movies, mainly produced by students of LAU, IESAV and other universities to be confirmed.

== Events ==
- Opening of American University of Beirut on Bliss Street at the end of the 19th century.
- Frequented by the Arab region's most prominent writers, intellectuals, and artists.
- Author Christopher Hitchens described Hamra Street in 2009 by saying: "As Arab thoroughfares go, Hamra Street in the center of Beirut is probably the most chic of them all. International in flavor, cosmopolitan in character, it boasts the sort of smart little café where a Lebanese sophisticate can pause between water-skiing in the Mediterranean in the morning and snow-skiing in the mountains just above the city in the afternoon. “The Paris of the Middle East” used to be the cliché about Beirut: by that exacting standard, I suppose, Hamra Street would be the Boulevard Saint-Germain."

== See also ==
- Theatre of Lebanon
