= Heinz Bongartz =

German conductor and composer

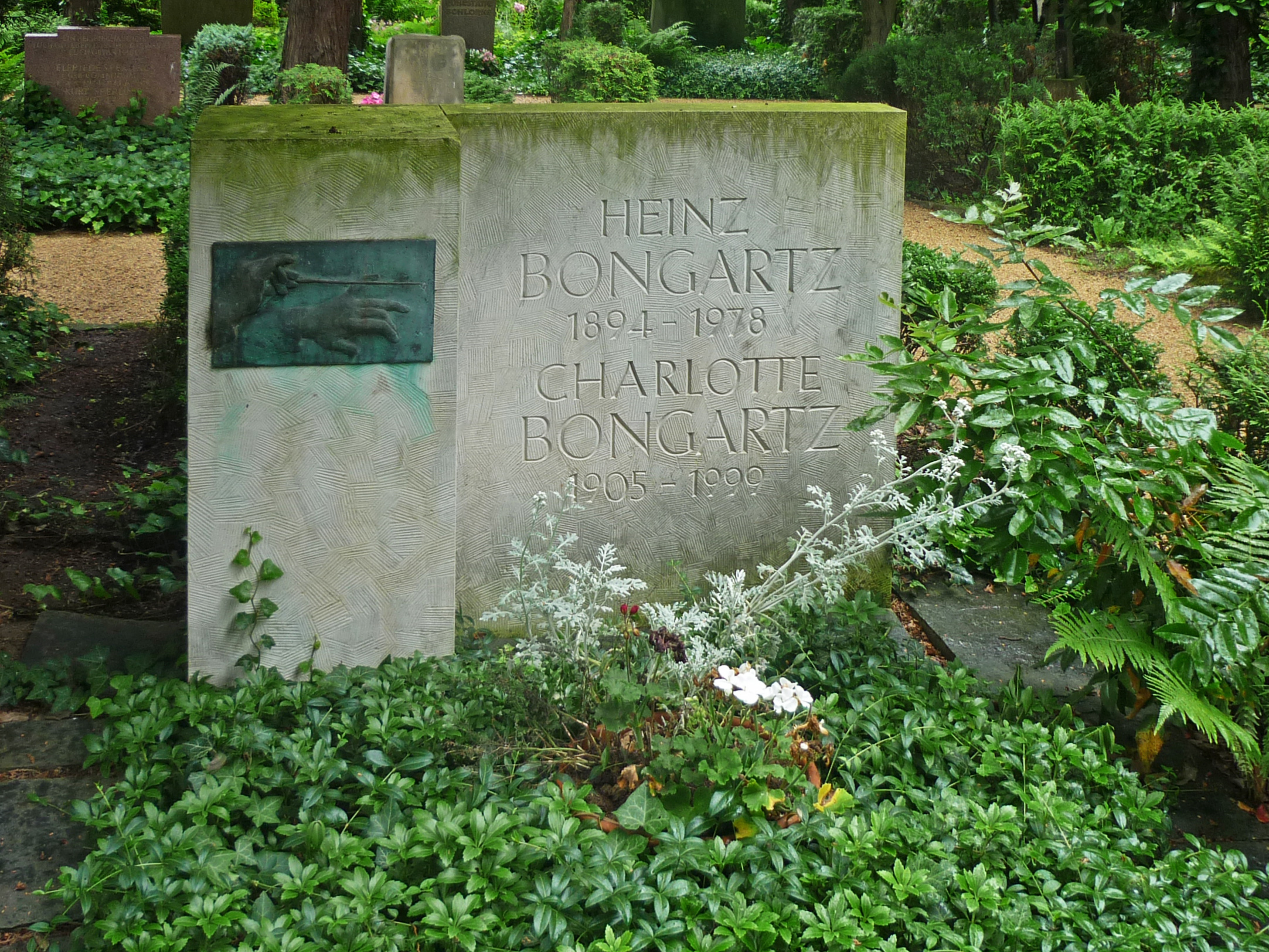

Heinz Bongartz (31 July 1894, Krefeld – 5 May 1978, Dresden) was a German conductor and composer. He had several conducting posts in Germany throughout the 20th century.

From 1924 to 1926, Bongartz was Kapellmeister of the Berlin Symphony Orchestra, then director of the Meiningen State Orchestra until 1930, and then chief musical director in Gotha until 1933. From 1933 to 1937, he held the office of First State Kapellmeister in Kassel. And from 1939 to 1944, he was general music director of the Saarland State Theatre in Saarbrücken. On March 6, 1941, he applied for membership in the Nazi Party and was admitted on April 1 of the same year (membership number 8,744,959).

Following the war, he was the first artistic manager of the Dresdner Philharmonie (Dresden Philharmonic Concert Halls) under the East German regime. He headed the orchestra's first tour to the Middle East in January 1967 which began in Beirut, Lebanon. After performing at Beirut's Piccadilly Theatre they performed the first of three concerts at the Cairo Opera House on 8 June. The tour also included performances in Alexandria, Egypt.
