= Al Mouaallima Wal Oustaz =

Lebanese drama-comedy television series

Al Mouaallima Wal Oustaz (Note: English: The Teacher and the Professor, Arabic: المعلّمة والأستاذ) is a Lebanese drama-comedy television series televised from 1980 to 1981, starring Ibrahim Maraachli, Hind Abi-Llama and Layla Karam. The series was broadcast on Télé Liban, the Lebanese national broadcaster, with a total of thirteen episodes.

== Summary ==
Al Mouaallima wal Oustaz takes place in a literacy school, named "Mahou L-Oummiya" (Arabic: محو الأُمّيّة, English: Erase Analphabetism), where two professors teach adults the Arabic language. The professor, Ibrahim, played by Ibrahim Meraachli, tries to marry the teacher, Hind, played by Hind Abi-Llama, and in the end, succeeds. The school's principal is named Sitt Zarifeh, ironically translating to Mrs. Sympathetic, played by Layla Karam.

== Cast and crew ==
=== Main characters ===
Character	Actor	Role
Ibrahim	Ibrahim Meraachli	Teacher
Hind	Hind Abi-Llama	Teacher
Zarife	Layla Karam	Principal

=== Minor characters ===
Character	Actor	Role
Abou L-Aabed	Ahmad Khalifeh	Student
Pierrot	Pierre Jamjian	Student
Yousef	Yousef Fakhri	Student
Amalia	Amalia Abi Saleh	Student
Shafiq	Shafiq Hassan	Student
Jean	Jean Khdayr	Student
'Afifé	Liliane Nemri	Hind's maid
Aalia'	Aalia' Nemri	Pierrot's mother

=== Crew ===
Role	Name
Producer	Antoine Remi
Director	Ghassan Ashkar
Scenario	Ibrahim Meraachli
Decor	Talal Neeman
Audio	Georges Feghali
Light	Elie Nassif
