= Nazl el sourour =

1974 musical by Ziad Rahbani

Nazl el-Sourour
- Original language: Arabic
- Written by: Ziad Rahbani
- Genre: comedy, political satire

Premiere
- Date: 1974

Nazl el-Sourour (also spelled Nazl es-Surur, Nazel el-Surour, etc.; Arabic: نزل السرور, literally "Happiness Hotel") is a musical play created by Lebanese playwright and composer Ziad Rahbani.

== Cast ==
- Ziad Rahbani
- Joseph Sakr
- Samy Hawat
- Carmen Lebbos
- Pierre Jamjian
- Jacqueline Becker

== Plot summary ==
Zakaria (Ziad) is an unemployed and penniless horse-racing betting addict. He is kicked out of his house by his wife Suraya and forced to choose a poor-man's motel called Nazl es-Surur.

Much to his dismay, the motel is raided by two laid-off factory workers during his first night's stay. The insurgents, Abbas and Fahed, armed with machine guns and dynamite take the residents hostage. Abbas and Fahed were fired from their work because they were stirring co-workers to go on strike and they chose to take a "revolutionary" approach. Things go downhill from there.

== Legacy ==
Nazl es-Surur was Ziad's second play after Sahriyya (An evening's celebration - 1973) but unlike the Rahbani movement conforming Sahriyya, Nazl es-Surur came to stand in contrast to the prevalent folklore orientation and theatricality of the works of his parents; it marked Ziad's ideological and artistic definitive break from the Rahbani school of thought.

The play was considered as an augury to the Lebanese Civil War which erupted in 1975, but Ziad himself rejected this view, affirming that it was based on a real-life incident - the taking of hostages at the Beirut branch of the Bank of America.

Although made in 1974, the play is still popular among Lebanese people and in the Arabic world - notably for its songs and script; in fact Ziad had introduced a new kind of language-based humor that was unprecedented in Lebanese theater. Fragments of dialogue from Nazl es-Surur and later Ziad plays continue to be used today and have become a part of the Lebanese pop-culture. The "Zakaria" character reappears with his wife "Souraya" in the 1978 play Bennesbe la bokra shou? (What do we need to do tomorrow?).

This play was Ziad's first real appearance, which was performed in Cinema Orly theater. Ziad's mother, Fairouz was so impressed by the song "Ba'atelak" (which reminds us of the period of the late Egyptian singer Mounira El Mahdeya), that she recorded the song herself after it was sung by a second class singer at the beginning of the seventies.
