= Migrant workers in the United Arab Emirates =

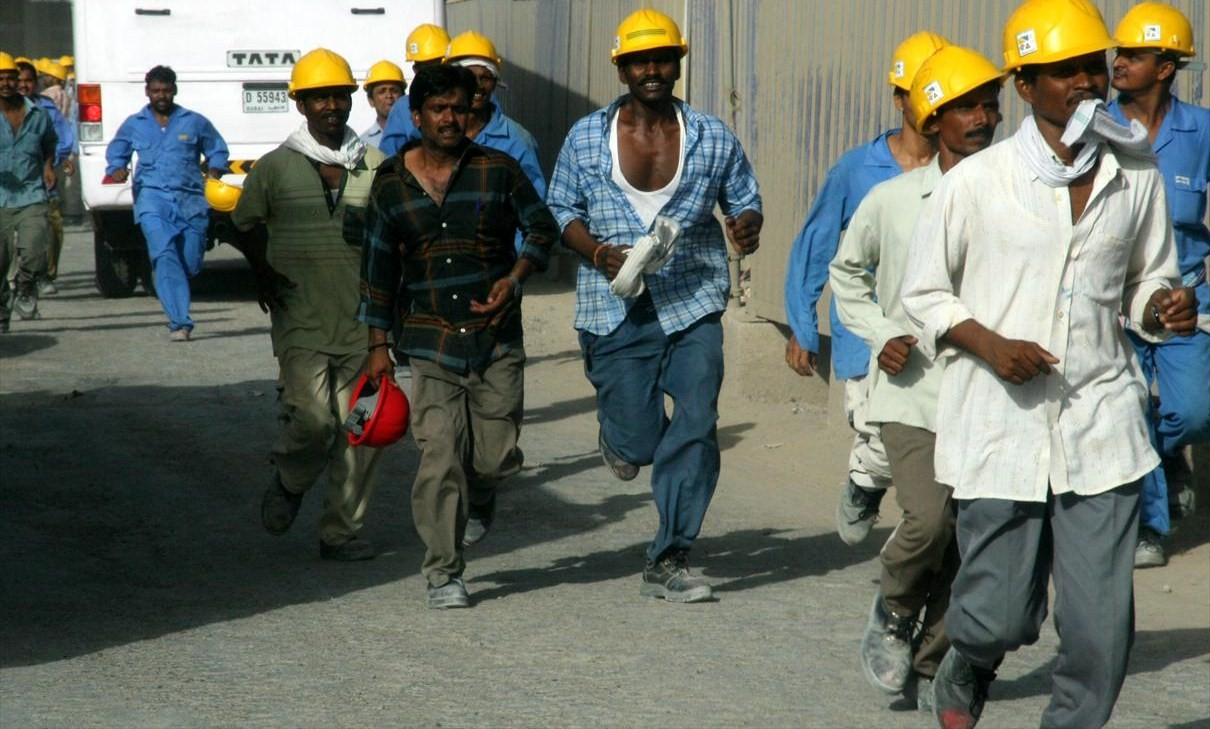
Migrant construction workers in Dubai

Migrant workers in the United Arab Emirates describe the foreign workers who have moved to the United Arab Emirates (UAE) for work. As a result of the proximity of the UAE to South Asia and a better economy and job opportunities, most of the migrant foreign workers are from India, Nepal, Sri Lanka, Bangladesh, Philippines and Pakistan.

In 2019, the UAE had the second-largest international migrant stock in the world at 87.9% with 8.6 million migrants (out of a total population of 9.8 million). Non-citizen, migrant workers, account for 90% of its workforce.

== Economy ==
The GCC area is the most popular destination for temporary labour migrants worldwide. The UAE's economy is one of the largest and fastest growing consumer market in the world. Its natural resources made it one of the world’s richest (high-average income) countries. The economy is supported by the oil and gas reserves that are among the largest worldwide. Immigration of labour, along with natural resources, fuel the UAE economy which is the largest consumer market in the Middle East.

== Emiratisation ==
Emiratis receive favorability in employment via the Emiratisation program forcing companies by law to limit the number of migrant workers in a company. This is done for the purposes of stabilizing the labour market and protecting the rights of this group as a minority in their own country. At the same time, however, due to the welfare benefits of the UAE government, many Emiratis are reluctant to take up low-paying jobs, especially those in the private sector, with citizens only representing 0.34% of the private sector workforce; private sector employers are also generally more inclined to hire overseas temporary workers as they are cheaper and can be retrenched for various reasons, for example, if they go on strike Most UAE locals also prefer government jobs and seek university degrees to gain higher positions.

== Alien work permit ==
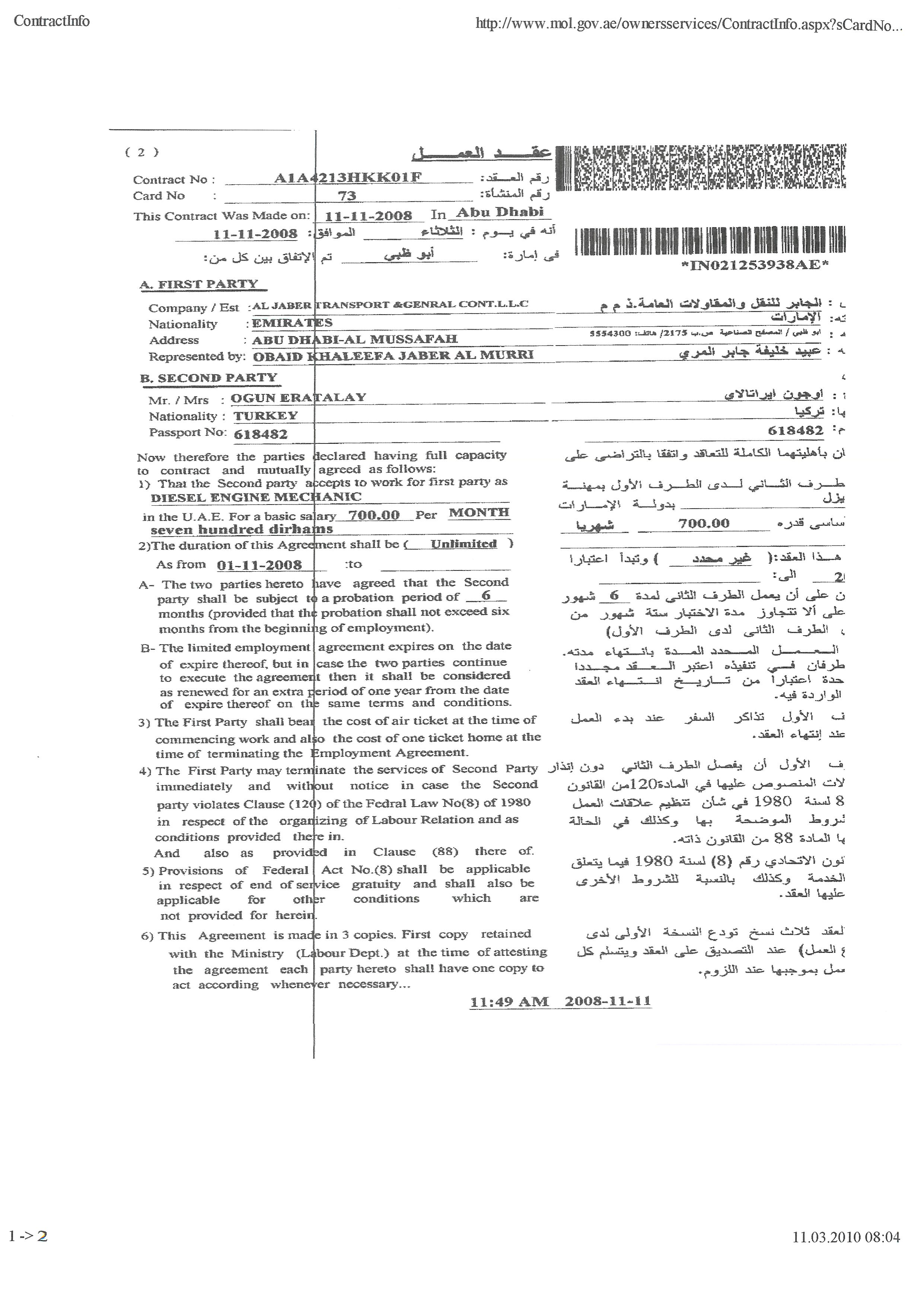
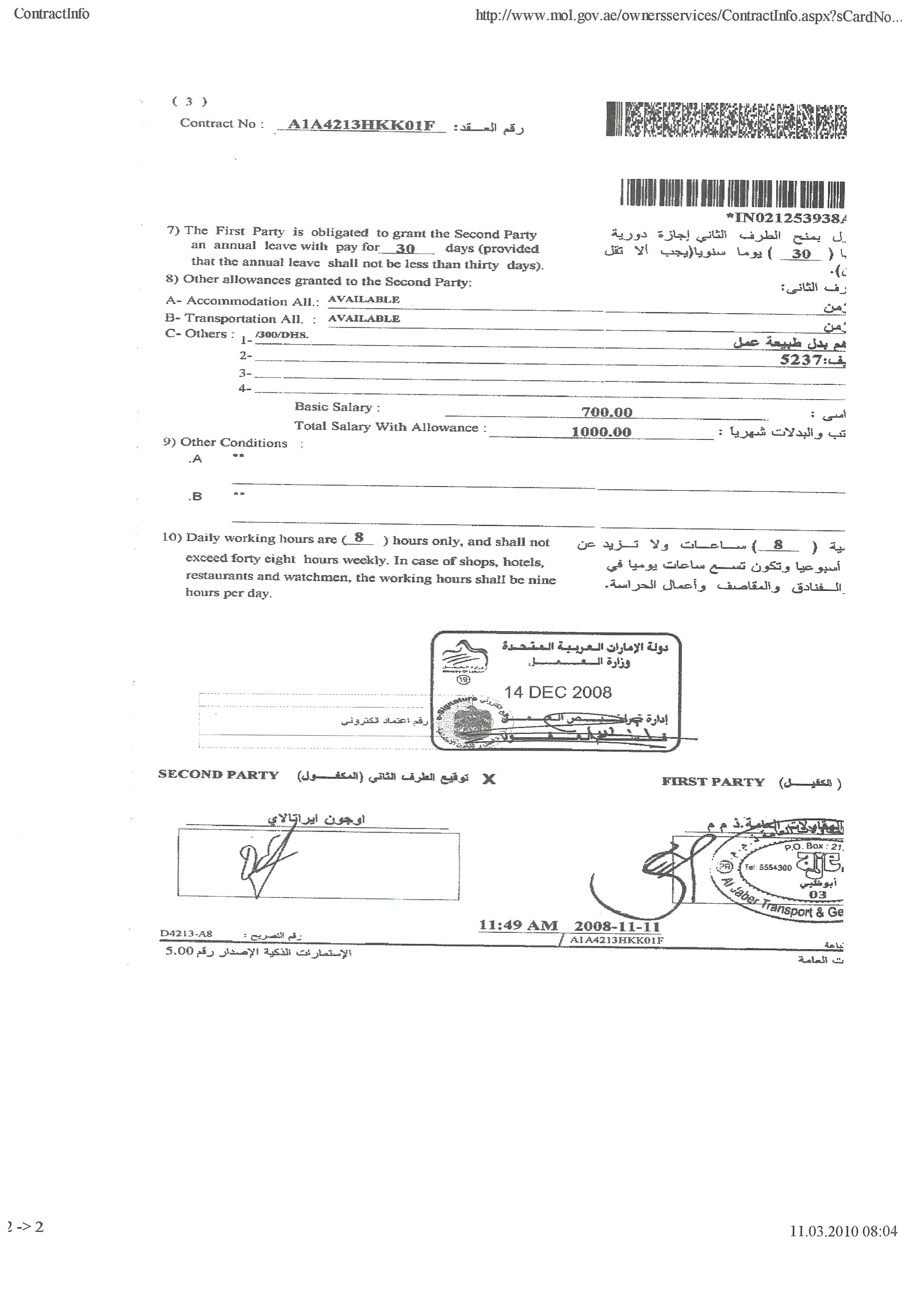
UAE alien worker contract

The United Arab Emirates has a work visa sponsorship system to issue work permits for foreign alien nationals who wish to migrate for work in the UAE. Most of the visas are sponsored by institutions and companies. A person looking to enter the UAE for work needs to first procure a work permit from the Ministry of Human Resources. The work permit allows the holder to enter the UAE for employment and it is valid for two months from the date of issue. After the employee enters the UAE on the basis of work, the sponsoring company or institution arranges to complete the requirements of medical testing, obtaining an Emirates ID card, and labour card and stamping the work residency permit on his passport. The work residency permit on the employee's passport denotes that his legal presence for work in the country is provided by the company he is employed. After this process, the employee can sponsor his family members and bring them into the country. Per Article 1 of Ministerial Decree No. 766 of 2015, an employee whose employment was terminated because of the expiry of his contract can get a new work permit when he wishes to join new employment. The employee may remain in the UAE on a 6-month job seeker visa to find a new job which will legalize his residency status to work in the country for a longer period. A new work permit is also issued if it is determined that the employer has failed to meet the legal and contractual obligations, including but not limited to failure to pay wages for more than 60 days. A worker may request his contract to be terminated after at least 6 months of employment. A worker whose employer terminated him unfairly is entitled to receive a new work permit without the need to complete six months.

The right of alien residence and work permit is protected by the UAE Federal Law No. 6 of 1973 on the Entry and Residence of aliens. Per UAE law, an employer may not deny an employee on a work visa right to annual leave, regularly paid wage, 45 days maternity leave, right to resign, resign gratuity, and a 30 day grace period to find a new job. An employer is also prohibited by law to confiscate an employee's passport, forcing the employee to pay for his residency visa fees or forcing the employee to work more than 8 hours a day or 45 hours a week without compensation. An employee who wishes to leave needs to complete their legal notice period, which is usually 30 days or less, before leaving their job or risk being banned to work in UAE for up to one year. Alien widows or divorced women whose legal presence in the country was sponsored by their husband's work status are given a 1 year visa to stay in the country without the need for a work permit or a sponsor. As of August 2019, the Federal Authority for Identity and Citizenship issued a new family sponsorship policy that permits UAE residents to sponsor dependents based on their income, not their job titles.

Employers in the UAE are required to initiate and complete a defined process to sponsor foreign workers, which includes applying for a work permit, securing medical fitness, and issuing a residence visa.

== Foreign labor ==
Skill is a measure of the worker's expertise and other related factors. The United Arab Emirates receive many labors from different nationalities and with different skill levels - from 1975 onwards, non-nationals have consistently outnumbered the number of nationals residing within the Emirates (see Table 1, below). Indian, Bangladeshi, Nepali, Sri Lankan, and Pakistani workers make up 90 percent of the workforce. Population growth in the United Arab Emirates is among the highest in world, mostly due to immigration. In low-skilled and semi-skilled jobs, workers from Asia and the MENA region are employed primarily. In high-skilled sectors are employed experts coming mainly from North America and Europe. As of the end of 2020, the most sought skilled labor are from Real Estate, Accounting and Engineering.

Total Population and Percentage of Nationals and Non-Nationals in the UAE
Year	Total Population	Nationals	Non-Nationals	% Nationals	% Non-Nationals
1975	557,887	201,544	356,343	36.13%	63.87%
1980	1,042,099	290,544	751,555	27.88%	72.12%
1985	1,379,303	396,114	983,189	28.72%	71.28%
1995	2,411,041	587,330	1,823,711	24.36%	75.64%
2005	4,106,427	825,495	3,280,932	20.10%	79.90%
2010	8,264,070	947,997	7,316,073	11.47%	88.53%
2016	9,121,176	1,153,576	7,967,600	12.66%	87.35%

== Labour reforms ==
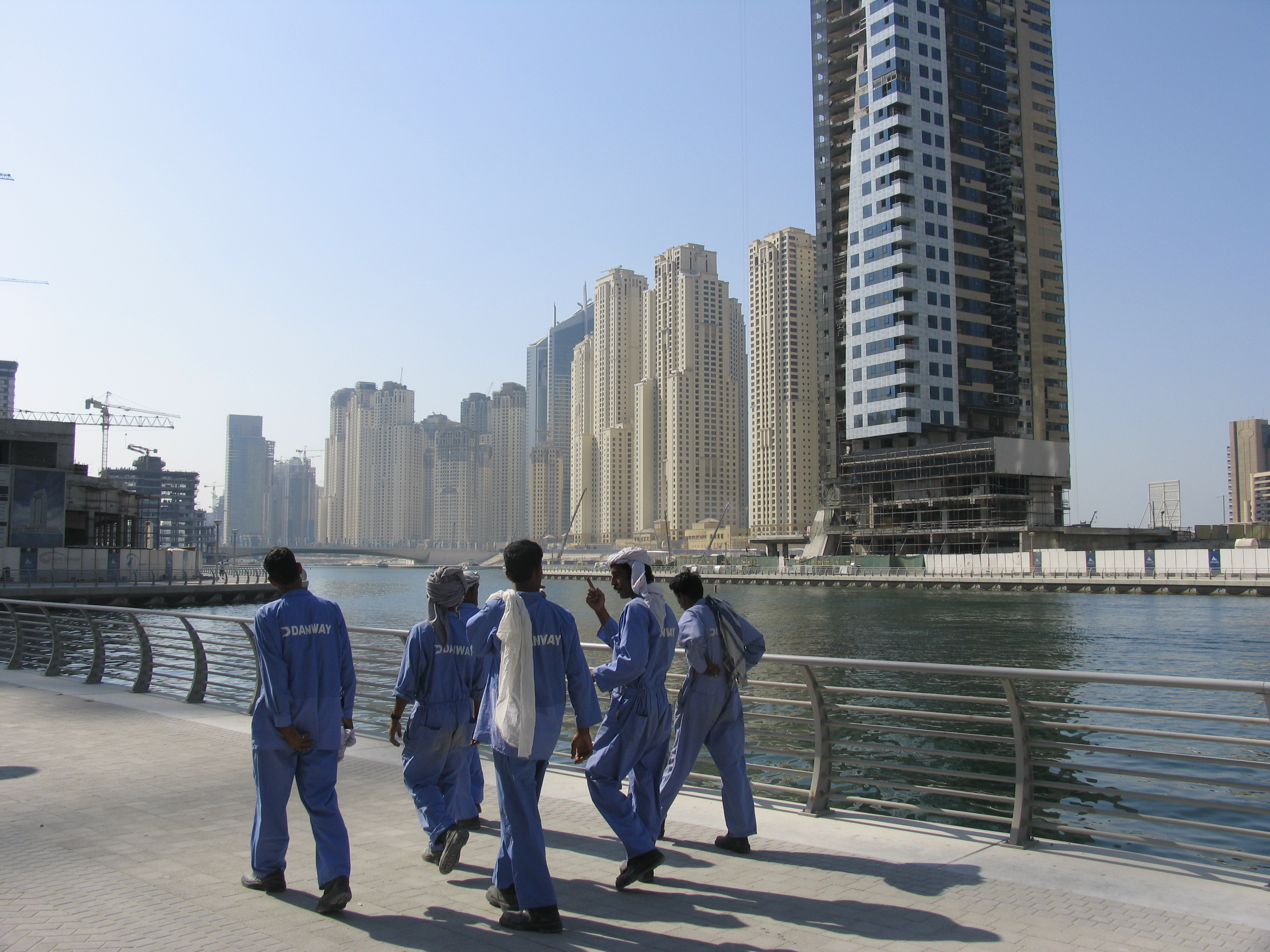

Reforms to abrogate the sponsorship system have been adopted in order to help prevent unfree labour that have emerged from the exploitation of the work visa sponsorship system. In January 2016, a ministerial decree, the first of its kind in Gulf Cooperation Council countries, was issued in order to protect low-paid migrant workers from becoming forced laborers. It has been criticized by the HRW for the lack of details and possibility of non-applicability to domestic workers.

The DCT or Democracy Centre for Transparency released a report in April 2021 citing the discrimination faced by foreign workers and expatriates living in the United Arab Emirates. The conclusion is drawn not only based on the conditions faced by the foreign workers but also drawn on the contrast between the treatment of expatriates and Emirati citizens. The report focuses on the fact that despite the easing of the Kafala system in 2020 as part of labor reforms, some substantial gaps remain in the implementation and enforcement of the legal efforts introduced in exchange by the government. The social hierarchy in combination with the Kafala system and the exclusionary citizenship law has led to the non-UAE nationals facing racialization, discrimination on the basis of gender, wages, and obtaining promotions.

Migrant workers in the UAE were seen working hard in the dangerous hot weather and humidity at the facilities that were being prepared for the COP28 climate conference, on two separate days in September 2023. FairSquare, human rights research and advocacy, obtained proof that more than a dozen migrant workers from Africa and Asia were working outside in temperatures hitting 42C in Dubai, despite a “midday ban”. Experts noted that the leaving migrant workers to work in extreme heat for climate negotiations in unjust.

=== UAE Domestic Workers Rights Bill ===
In June 2017, the UAE adopted a new bill to bring the country's labor law into consistency with the International Labour Organization's (ILO) Domestic Workers Convention, providing migrant domestic workers with the same labor protections as other workers in the UAE. The bill requires employers to provide domestic workers with accommodation and food and provides them with 30 days of annual paid leave and daily rest of at least 12 hours. It also guarantee 15 days of paid sick leave, 15 days of unpaid sick leave, and compensation for work-related injuries or illnesses. The bill sets out a weekly rest day but permits the employer to make the domestic worker forgo the rest day if paid.

=== UAE Pension Reform ===
In 2023, the UAE introduced a voluntary pension scheme as part of a broader effort to replace traditional end-of-service indemnities, aligning with the growing trend of pension reforms across GCC countries. This initiative aims to provide foreign workers with more sustainable retirement benefits. Unlike the previous end-of-service indemnity model, the new pension system is portable, allowing workers to transfer their funds if they change employers or leave the country. By encouraging long-term savings and offering a more secure financial future, the scheme helps the UAE attract and retain skilled foreign talent, while also aligning with international retirement standards. The system is optional for employers and is managed by private savings and investment funds, under the supervision of the Securities and Commodities Authority, in coordination with the Ministry of Human Resources and Emiratisation (MOHRE).

=== Labour Card ===
A labour card, or work permit, is a digital card issued by the Ministry of Human Resources and Emiratisation (MOHRE). It functions similarly to an ID card, containing personal information as well as professional details such as job title, employer, and work permit number. While not all workers in the UAE require a labour card, most private sector employees must obtain one within 60 days of their arrival in the country.

In June 2025, the Ministry of Human Resources and Emiratisation (MoHRE) launched digital services that enable users to easily check the status of their labour cards via the MOHRE website and app.

== Human rights ==
Migrants, mostly of South Asian origin, constitute the majority of the UAE’s workforce and have reportedly been subject to a range of human rights abuses. Workers have sometimes arrived in debt to recruitment agents from home countries and upon arrival were made to sign a new contract in English or Arabic that pays them less than had originally been agreed, although this is illegal under UAE law. Further to this, some categories of workers have had their passports withheld by their employer. This illegal practice is to stop workers leaving the country. Although racial discrimination is prohibited by UAE law, there are some incidents where individuals have been ill-treated on the basis of their nationality or race by employers.

- In September 2003 the government was criticised by Human Rights Watch for its inaction in addressing the discrimination against Asian workers in the Emirates.
- In 2004, the United States Department of State has cited widespread instances of blue collar labour abuse in the general context of the United Arab Emirates.
- The BBC reported in September 2004 that "local newspapers often carry stories of construction workers allegedly not being paid for months on end. They are not allowed to move jobs and if they leave the country to go home they will almost certainly lose the money they say they are owed. The names of the construction companies concerned are not published in the newspapers for fear of offending the often powerful individuals who own them.".
- In December 2005 the Indian consulate in Dubai submitted a report to the Government of India detailing labour problems faced by Indian expatriates in the emirate. The report highlighted delayed payment of wages, substitution of employment contracts, premature termination of services and excessive working hours as being some of the challenges faced by Indian workers in the city. The consulate also reported that 109 Indian blue collar workers committed suicide in the UAE in 2006.
- In March 2006, NPR reported that workers "typically live eight to a room, sending home a portion of their salary to their families, whom they don't see for years at a time." Others report that their salary has been withheld to pay back loans, making them little more than indentured servants.
- In 2007, the falling dollar meant workers were unable to service debts and the incidence of suicides among Indian workers had reportedly been on the increase.
- In January 2020, exploitative employers in UAE were reported to have been using tourists visas to hire Indian nationals, a scam that left several workers open to labor abuse. The visit visas were being preferred as they are quicker and cheaper than work permits.
- In May 2021, various rights group claimed that Transguard Group (which boasts of being UAE’s leading business solution’s provider) is involved in abusing migrant workers. As per Business and Human Rights Resource Centre, several reports claim that the firm had confiscated passports, offered employees’ salary below minimum wages, imposed forced contract changes and exercised other forms of abuse on migrant workers working on Expo 2020 project.
- In July 2024, an Emirati court’s verdict led to long prison terms for 57 Bangladeshis over protests in the UAE against their own country’s government due to the unrest. Three of the defendants received life imprisonment, 53 were jailed for 10 years and one for 11 years. The defendants were to be deported after serving their sentences. The protests had no criminal intent as per the court-appointed defense lawyer. Amnesty International criticized the Emirates’ harsh response to the protests, saying it indicated the country’s priority on suppressing any form of dissent in the country.

Neha Vora, Assistant Professor of Anthropology at Lafayette College, said the challenges faced by immigrants are not particular to the Gulf region but suggest "broader trends in contemporary global mobility and capitalism.”

=== Incident of domestic workers abuse ===
In October 2014, Human Rights Watch estimated that there were 146,000 female migrant domestic workers in the UAE whose work visa was sponsored by employers in the UAE. In an interview with 99 female domestic workers, HRW listed abuses claimed by their interviewees: most had their passports confiscated by their employers; in many cases, wages were not fully paid, overtime (up to 21 hours per day) was required, or food, living conditions or medical treatment was insufficient. 24 had been physically or sexually abused. HRW criticized the UAE government for failing to adequately protect domestic workers from exploitation and abuse and made many recommendations to the UAE, including repeal or amendment of Federal Law No. 6 of 1973 on the Entry and Residence of Foreigners, so that domestic workers can decide on their own to change between employers without losing their immigration status. The UAE introduced Ministerial Decree No. 766 of 2015, which allows a worker to terminate his contract without losing their immigration status if the employer has treated him or her unfairly and be issued a new work permit, or to request the contract to be terminated without losing immigration status and receive a new work permit after at least 6 months of employment provided they have found a new employer.

The act of confiscating passports is illegal and against UAE law.

The Guardian has shared interviews and documents describing the situation of women who search for job as domestic workers in the UAE. The report stated that these women are sold to household employers over online applications and social media platforms like Instagram, TikTok and Facebook. The women are marketed in an “exploitative” way, which experts say is similar to slavery. Women domestic workers in the UAE are detained and kept in poor accommodations by recruitment agencies, often facing abuse. It was also revealed that the domestic workers are paid monthly according to the race, where Black workers are paid less.

== COVID-19 pandemic ==
In 2020, migrant workers in Dubai were left jobless because of the COVID-19 pandemic. With visas expired and no salaries, many had to leave their accommodation and had no place of their own. Consequently, several migrant workers were forced to sleep outside. These workers were dismissed by their employers and also ran out of money to return home.

On 16 November 2020, reports claimed that visas of 80 per cent of Filipino artists in Dubai were cancelled by their employers.

== See also ==
- Economy of the United Arab Emirates
- Expatriates in the United Arab Emirates
- Indians in the United Arab Emirates
- Pakistanis in the United Arab Emirates
- Slavery in the United Arab Emirates
