= Foreign domestic worker protests =

Protests by immigrant domestic workers

As the number of foreign domestic workers (FDW, also known as migrant domestic workers) continues to increase around the world, social movements to protect them have begun. The increase in social movements can be attributed to the rise of globalization, increased flows of migratory workers, and issues arising from the neoliberal management of workers. Repeated complaints and demands by pro-labor movements typically revolving around issues such as minimum wage and insurance coverage can be seen. These demands usually move away from a narrative of labor disputes and begin to encompass a human-rights perspective.

How these social movements manifest depends on the level of restrictions and autonomy given workers by employers and foreign governments. Although Hong Kong allows demonstrations and NGOs, the Middle East continues to outlaw such practices. This has led some workers to alternative forms of resistance.

Protesting outside one's home country is a relatively new phenomenon, and scholars have noted that the potential to protest relies on a quasi-stateless nature. Although foreign domestic workers receive visas to live and work temporarily in their host country, they rarely become citizens or permanent residents of their country of employment.

== East Asia ==
=== Hong Kong ===
Hong Kong is a major East Asian metropolis with industry, trade, and economic freedoms fueling its development. Because of a local, highly-skilled labor force, there has been an influx of migrant domestic workers to the Chinese special administrative region since it left British control. These workers were initially mainly Filipino, but Indonesians currently make up about half; workers from Nepal, Thailand, and Malaysia are a small minority.

Because of the large number of foreign domestic workers and Hong Kong's democratic stances on freedom of speech and assembly, the region has become a center of protests. Hundreds of NGOs and labor unions have formed partnerships with international human-rights and labor organizations, such as Migrant International (in the Philippines) and the International Labour Organization (ILO).

=== Singapore ===
Although foreign domestic workers have been common in Singapore since before the state's independence, the number of protests is significantly less than in Hong Kong. Foreign construction workers (predominantly male) have mobilized and improved their situation in similar issues, such as unfair wages. Singapore has had a mixed history with its foreign domestic-worker policy. Migration was restricted during the early post-independence era, but was later promoted (and subsidized) by the government to influence Singaporean women to take skilled-labor jobs. Cases of mistreatment of foreign domestic workers exist, but they afford some benefits and protections (such as the 1997 Employment of Foreign Manpower Act, which requires employers to purchase a $10,000 accident-insurance policy).

== Middle East ==
The Middle East is an area of concern about the welfare of foreign domestic workers, who generally lack freedom of mobility and other rights. Under the Kafala system in many Middle Eastern countries, workers have been physically abused, overly controlled, and isolated.

=== Lebanon ===
Foreign domestic workers in Lebanon, which uses the Kafala system, are primarily from Africa, Sri Lanka, India, and the Philippines. Because of Lebanon's strict laws about freedom of assembly and the illegality of unions and NGOs, it is difficult for workers to protest publicly. Instead, they go against their employers' and the state's wishes to increase their autonomy. Nominal or non- Christians ask employers for Sunday off to attend church, where they socialize, disseminate information, and gain a better understanding of how to improve their situation.

Those with less freedom have balcony talks. Since Lebanon has many tall, residential buildings with small balconies, workers use the balconies as a refuge where they can talk with others about the same subjects as in a church setting. Some workers consider the balconies their own space, which is minimally monitored by employers.

== United States ==
The number of foreign domestic workers in the United States is relatively small compared to other regions; the country has about 200,000, half of Lebanon's total. About 7.5 percent are from Asia, most from the Philippines. Labor-rights movements and protests address the same complaints as those of foreign domestic workers elsewhere.

== Causes ==
Foreign domestic workers worldwide (including democratic or developed countries, such as the United States) note wage-and-hour violations, restrictions on freedom of movement, abuse, and isolation. Workers frequently receive an inadequate wage or less than minimum wage. Many consider themselves as working around the clock, since their workplace is also their residence. Since these workers are legally vulnerable, they may be physically or mentally abused by employers. Many workers report feelings of isolation, due to strict supervision and the inability to leave the household, and rely on their phones for entertainment, information and connection with loved ones. Foreign domestic workers see their treatment as similar to slavery; workers may go months without being paid, and cannot leave a position due to strict local laws, confiscation of their passport by employers, and lack of funds to return to their home country.

== Unconventional protests ==
=== Erwiana Sulistyaningish ===
On January 11, 2014, photos of severely-beaten Hong Kong-based domestic worker Erwiana Sulistyaningsih were posted on Facebook. The photos were quickly shared by an Indonesian journalist and, three days later, a Facebook group entitled Justice for Erwiana and All Migrant Domestic Workers Committee was formed. The group attracted national and international attention, and by January 16 it had organized a protest in conjunction with the Asian Migratory Coordinating Body (AMCB). The movement was reported by the South China Morning Post, NewsForAfrica, Daily Mail, The New York Times, and Australia's ABC News. Although Sulistyaningsih's case was not unprecedented, social media brought her broad support in the form of events, petitions, and protests from international organizations. She continues to advocate for domestic migrant-worker rights.

=== 2005 Hong Kong consulate-hopping ===
On December 15, 2005, foreign domestic workers participated in a consulate-hopping and Hall of Shame Awards protest. Many protesters were dressed as politicians and figures from their home country, such as Nepal's king Gyanendra who was crowned King of Tyrants. As the protesters visited consulates and presented awards for poor governance by their home countries, they were doing the same for the government of Hong Kong. A man representing Chief Executive Donald Tsang received an Edward Scissorhands Award for cutting wages and benefits and imposing a monthly tax on their employers. The protest ended in front of the U.S. consulate, with a Terror Award presented to a costumed George W. Bush and protesters calling the U.S. the number-one terrorist.
