= Blocked mobility =

Sociological concept of structural barriers to social mobility

Blocked mobility, sometimes called the blocked-mobility hypothesis, is a concept in sociology referring to structural barriers to upward social mobility experienced by particular groups within a society. The term originated in mid-twentieth century American community studies, in which researchers including W. Lloyd Warner and Robert and Helen Lynd argued that industrialization was constricting opportunities for occupational advancement in the United States. The concept has subsequently been taken up in the sociology of ethnic entrepreneurship, in studies of immigrant incorporation, in research on indigenous ethnic and religious minorities within dominant societies, and in political sociology of cultural nationalism.

The term is also used in other contexts for physical restrictions on movement, including cross-border fortifications studied in border research and architectural and environmental barriers affecting people with disabilities or limited mobility; these usages address distinct phenomena and are not covered in this article.

== Community Studies ==
Community studies of mid-twentieth century American sociology examined social structure in particular cities centered on intensive fieldwork.

In their studies of an industrial city they called Yankee City, W. Lloyd Warner and J. O. Low argued that mechanization and division of labor had broken the skill hierarchy that had previously offered factory workers paths to occupational advancement. Similar arguments appeared in Robert and Helen Lynd's Middletown studies and in related community research of the period.

A 1973 experimental simulation by sociologist Burton B. Silver, drawing on Ralf Dahrendorf's propositions concerning openness and conflict, found that conditions of mobility blockage produced increased intergroup antagonism toward scapegoated outgroups.

In a 1968 essay, historian Stephan Thernstrom argued on historical and empirical grounds that the community-studies version of the hypothesis overstated structural status degradation, citing his own quantitative studies of working class mobility in Newburyport and Boston and proposing instead a mobility cycle in which immigrants and rural migrants often experienced upward mobility relative to their prior circumstances.

== Ethnic entrepreneurship research ==
In the ethnic entrepreneurship literature, blocked mobility refers to structural disadvantages in the host society labor market that prevent immigrants and ethnic minorities from obtaining wage employment commensurate with their qualifications. These disadvantages may include discrimination, non-recognition of foreign educational and professional credentials, language barriers, and unfamiliarity with host society institutions. The thesis holds that immigrants facing such conditions often turn to self-employment as an alternative. The thesis was articulated in part as an alternative to cultural explanations that attribute immigrant business success to traits internal to the minority group, such as kinship organization, frugality, or a sojourning orientation toward the homeland. Historical examples include the concentration of Chinese immigrants in laundries and restaurants in late nineteenth and early twentieth century North America. Alongside blocked mobility, the literature distinguishes the class resources approach, emphasizing human and financial capital, and the ethnic resources approach, highlighting co-ethnic networks and community based forms of support.

Studies have tested the hypothesis in several national contexts. Roderic Beaujot, Paul S. Maxim, and John Z. Zhao, using 1986 Canadian census data, found the hypothesis most strongly supported among immigrants holding high educational credentials obtained outside Canada, identifying non-recognition of foreign credentials as a mechanism distinct from discrimination. Rebeca Raijman and Marta Tienda, in a study of immigrant business ownership in Chicago, found that the relative weight of labor market disadvantage, class based assets, and ethnic community resources varied by national origin, gender, and local context. Mohammad Alaslani and Jock Collins, in a 2017 survey of Muslim immigrant entrepreneurs in Sydney, identified Islamophobia in the post-September 11 Australian labor market as a religion-based mechanism producing blocked mobility for approximately one third of their sample. The resulting downward shift in occupational status has been termed occupational skidding in the migration literature.

In a 1993 reassessment of Chinese business and investment in Canada, sociologist Peter S. Li argued that the blocked-mobility thesis is inadequate to account for the postwar diversification of Chinese ethnic enterprise. While conceding that the thesis explained the prewar concentration in laundries and restaurants under conditions of legalized discrimination, Li identified contemporary forms including professional firms, corporate subsidiaries, and capital intensive ventures whose growth reflected the postwar opening of labor market opportunities and immigration policy changes rather than labor market disadvantage.

== Other Applications ==
Sociologist Alejandro Portes drew on blocked mobility in articulating his theory of segmented assimilation, arguing that the blocked mobility historically experienced by labor migrants in American inner cities produced an oppositional outlook that contemporary second-generation immigrants can adopt, contributing to what segmented assimilation theory terms downward assimilation. In a 2017 ethnographic study of Liberian refugees in the United States, sociologist Hana E. Brown identified bodily socialization, the physical habits and motor skills people learn through their cultural upbringing, as a mechanism of blocked mobility distinct from discrimination, language, and credentials, documenting how refugees from rural agrarian backgrounds struggled with the fine motor demands of mainstream institutional technologies such as automated teller machines and touchscreen interfaces.

A 2007 monograph by sociologist Blaine Kaltman applied the framework to the Uyghur of northwestern China, an indigenous ethnic minority, documenting how language requirements, educational disparities, employment discrimination, and religious restrictions constrained opportunities for advancement within Han-dominated Chinese society. The framework has also been used in political sociology to explain the rise of cultural nationalism, with proponents arguing that university-educated young people whose upward mobility is thwarted by overproduction of graduates and a contracting state structure may turn to nationalist movements as a means of opening career opportunities; sociologist Jeffrey J. Cormier, in a 2003 reassessment using archival data from early twentieth century Ireland and 1960s Canada, found that neither case exhibited the demographic preconditions the thesis required.

== Related concepts ==
- Ethnic entrepreneurship
- Ethnic enclave economy
- Middleman minority theory
- Mixed embeddedness
- Labor market segmentation
- Social mobility
- Status attainment
