= Piccadilly Theatre (Beirut) =

The Piccadilly Theatre in Rue Hamra, Beirut was a major venue for concerts, musicals and plays in Lebanon during the 1960s and the 1970s. The theatre was designed by Lebanese architect William Sednaoui in 1965 and was the first ever theatre on Rue Hamra. Though it had a small number of seats (nearly 700), the Piccadilly was considered one of the most significant theatres in Lebanon, and the Middle East. The theatre closed down in the mid 1980s, soon after the beginning of the Lebanese Civil War which lasted from 1975 until 1990. It was run by the Mamiche & Itani company. In July 2022, it was announced that Piccadilly Theatre would be restored after closing 40 years prior.

Among the important artists who performed there:

Lebanese diva Fairuz (where she performed 9 of her musicals from 1967 until 1978), and the French diva Dalida (where she performed 4 concerts in it from 1971 until 1975).

Dresdner Philharmonie (Dresden Philharmonic Concert Halls) led by Heinz Bongartz in January 1967
