= Rue Spears =

Street in Beirut, Lebanon

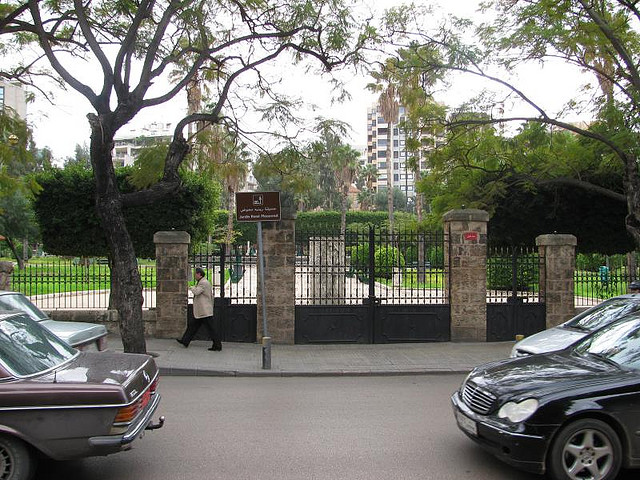
Entrance to the René Moawad Garden on Rue Spears

Rue Spears is a street in Beirut, Lebanon, that was named after British General Edward Spears, who in 1941 liaised with General Charles de Gaulle and his Free French movement to liberate the Levant. He was appointed the British minister in Beirut in 1942. Spears would later also urge the Lebanese and Syrians to claim independence from France after being converted to the Arab nationalist vision. Due to his initiatives, Great Britain recognized a de facto independent Lebanon in 1942.

Rue Spears is a one-way street that runs west-east, beginning at the intersection of Rue de Rome and ending at Rue Fakhreddine. René Moawad Garden is located on the street and so is the National Library, National Radio Station, Ministry of Interior, Chamber of Commerce, Future Television studios, and Helem Center, the Middle-East's first gay rights organization.

== See also ==
- Ras Beirut
- Beirut
