= René Moawad Garden =

Public open-air space in Beirut, Lebanon

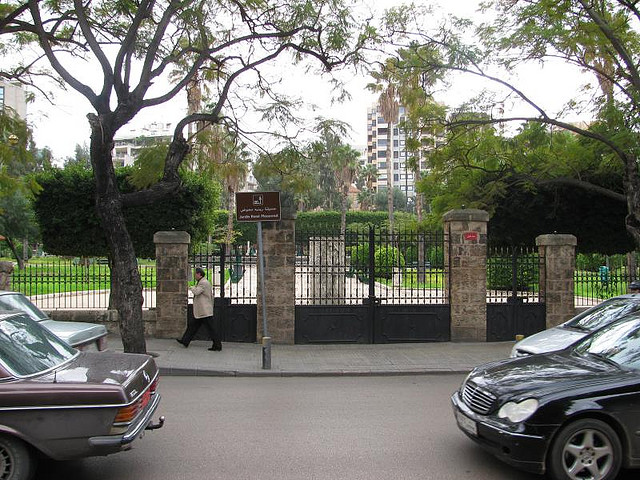
Entrance to the garden on Rue Spears in 2010

The Ottoman jamal pasha Garden (Turkish: cemal pasa) known by the public as the Sanayeh Garden is located in the Sanayeh district of Beirut, Lebanon. The garden is one of the oldest public open-air spaces in the capital. Khalil Pasha (1864–1923), commander of the Turkish Sixth Army during World War I ordered the creation of the garden in 1907.

== Name ==
The garden has changed names since its construction in the first decade of the 20th century. It was first called The Hamidi Public Garden, but the public for decades referred to it as the Sanayeh Garden. It was renamed in honor of President René Moawad who was assassinated on November 22, 1989, near to the garden.

== Location ==
The garden is bordered from the north by Rue Spears, from the south by Rue Alameddine, from the east by Rue Halawani and from the west by Rue Sanayeh. Facing the garden on Rue Spears is the complex of the National Library. Covering 22,000 square meters, the garden is a popular destination for walkers, joggers and children. The garden is also popular among the elderly who sit in the shade of the trees to play cards, backgammon or chess. The garden is also a place where artists exhibit their work.

== During the 2006 War ==
After the 2006 Lebanon War started, the garden and its surrounding became a meeting point for refugees and NGOs. The "Sanayeh Relief Center" was located in a house facing the garden.

== In literature and theater ==
- Day of Honey: A Memoir of Food, Love, and War by Annia Ciezadlo

"I went to a small public park called Sanayeh Garden with Jackson and our friend Abdulrahman, who was going around Ras Beirut buying food and medicine for refugees with his own money."

"The only people handling the refugee crisis in Sanayeh Garden were a handful of students in their teens and twenties, one of them wearing the splint and bandage of a recent nose job."

- Jnaynet Al-Sanaye' (Sanayeh Garden) a play by Roger Assaf (1997)
