= Ibrahim Maraachli =

Lebanese actor

- Born: January 27, 1937; Lebanon
- Died: September 15, 2004 (aged 67); Beirut, Lebanon
- Years active: 1967–2004

Ibrahim Maraachli or Meraachli (Arabic: إبراهيم مرعشلي) (27 January 1937 – 15 September 2004) was a Lebanese television, radio and stage actor and comedian of turkish origin from Kahramanmaraş. He took part in a great number of plays on Lebanese television and stage for three decades. He was best known for his roles in Lebanese TV series such as Al Mouaallima Wal Oustaz, "Ibrahim Afandi" and "Captain Bob".

== Career ==
He started his career in the 1960s with roles in Egyptian and Lebanese films. Then he worked with famous Lebanese comedian, actor and playwright Hassan Alaa Eddin popularly known as Chouchou or Shoushou when the latter established the National Theatre (known as Al Masrah al Watani المسرح الوطني) with roles in many Chouchou's plays. He worked in radio mainly in comedic sketches, and was greatly famous with his roles on Lebanese national television for a great number of popular television series and in voice over of a number of cartoons.

== Theatre ==
- Chouchou in Sofar (Master Chouchou in Sawfar) شوشو في صوفر
- Akh ya baladna آخ يا بلدنا
- Funduq al Sa'aada فندق السعادة
- Chouchou wal Malyoun (Chouchou and the Million) شوشو والمليون
- Adas wa Caviar (Beans and Caviar) عدس وكافيار
- Hait el Jiran (The Wall of the neighbours) حيط الجيران
- Weslet lal 99 - وصلت لل 99
- Stop Madrasat Bob (Stop Bob's School) ستوب مدرسة بوب
- El Cowboy Marra min Huna (The Cowboy Passed from Here) الكاوبوي مر من هنا

== Filmography ==
Cinema

- Antar Yaghzou al Sahraa' عنتر يغزو الصحراء
- Badawiyyah fi Paris بدوية في باريس
- Ajmal Ayyam Hayati أجمل أيام حياتي
- Al Ukhwa al Gurabaa' الأخوه الغرباء
- Paris wal Hobb باريس والحب
- Maw'ed maa'l Hayat موعد مع الحياة

Television

- Captain Bob كابتن بوب
- Ibrahim Efendi إبراهيم أفندي
- Al mouaallima wal oustaz (The teacher and the professor) المعلمة والأستاذ
- Burj el Hubb برج الحب
- Secreterat al Baba سكرتيرة البابا
- Al Layl al Tawil الليل الطويل
- Ayaam al Dirasa أيام الدراسة
- Ya Mudeer يا مدير
- Masrah al Fukahah مسرح القكاهة
- Al Aghani wal Ma'aani الأغاني والمعاني
- ... and others

Voice overs

- Kimba the White Lion - Al Layth al Abiad الليث الأبيض
- Astroganger - Ghuzat min al Fadaa' غزاة من الفضاء
- Treasure Island - Jazirat al Kanz - جزيرة الكنز
- Arabian Nights: Sinbad's Adventures - Mughaamaraat Sindibaad - مغامرات سندباد
- ..and others
