= 65th San Sebastián International Film Festival =

2017 film festival in San Sebastián, Spain

- Opening film: Submergence
- Closing film: The Wife
- Location: San Sebastián, Spain
- Founded: 1953
- Awards: Golden Shell: The Disaster Artist
- Festival date: 22–30 September 2017
- Website: www.sansebastianfestival.com

San Sebastián International Film Festival chronology
- 66th 64th

The 65th San Sebastián International Film Festival took place from 22 to 30 September 2017 in San Sebastián, Gipuzkoa, Spain. The festival opened with Wim Wenders' Submergence, which competed for the Golden Shell, and closed with Björn Runge's The Wife, screened out of competition.

The Official Selection jury was chaired by American actor and filmmaker John Malkovich. The Golden Shell was awarded to James Franco's The Disaster Artist, while Handia, directed by Aitor Arregi and Jon Garaño, received the Special Jury Prize.

The festival presented three Donostia Awards, honouring Argentine actor Ricardo Darín, Italian actress Monica Bellucci and French filmmaker Agnès Varda.

== Juries ==
=== Official Selection ===
The jury for the Official Selection was composed of:

- John Malkovich, American actor, director and producer – Jury President
- Dolores Fonzi, Argentine actress
- Jorge Guerricaechevarría, Spanish screenwriter
- William Oldroyd, British film director
- Emma Suárez, Spanish actress
- André Szankowski, Brazilian cinematographer
- Paula Vaccaro, Italian producer and screenwriter

=== New Directors ===
The New Directors jury was composed of:

- Rossitsa Valkanova – Jury President
- Carlos Muguiro
- Fionnuala Halligan
- Javier Porta Fouz
- Valérie Mréjen

=== Horizontes Latinos ===
The Horizontes Award jury was composed of:

- Ángela Molina – Jury President
- Gaël Nouaille
- Lina Paola Rodríguez Fernández

=== Zabaltegi-Tabakalera ===
The Zabaltegi-Tabakalera jury was composed of:

- Calmin Borel – Jury President
- Savina Neirotti
- Carla Simón

== Official Selection ==
The Official Selection consisted of 18 films competing for the Golden Shell, three productions screened out of competition and four special screenings.

=== In competition ===
The following films competed for the Golden Shell:

English title	Original title	Director(s)	Country
Alanis	Alanis	Anahí Berneri	Argentina
Beyond Words	Beyond Words	Urszula Antoniak	Poland / Netherlands
The Captain	Der Hauptmann	Robert Schwentke	Germany / France / Poland
The Motive	El autor	Manuel Martín Cuenca	Spain / Mexico
Handia	Handia	Aitor Arregi, Jon Garaño	Spain
Memoir of War	La douleur	Emmanuel Finkiel	France
The Lion Sleeps Tonight	Le lion est mort ce soir	Nobuhiro Suwa	France / Japan
C'est la vie!	Le sens de la fête	Olivier Nakache, Éric Toledano	France
Mademoiselle Paradis	Licht	Barbara Albert	Austria / Germany
Life and Nothing More	Life and Nothing More	Antonio Méndez Esparza	Spain / United States
Love Me Not	Love Me Not	Alexandros Avranas	Greece / France
So Help Me God	Ni juge, ni soumise	Jean Libon, Yves Hinant	Belgium / France
Pororoca	Pororoca	Constantin Popescu	Romania / France
Soldiers. Story from Ferentari	Soldații. Poveste din Ferentari	Ivana Mladenović	Romania / Serbia / Belgium
Sollers Point	Sollers Point	Matthew Porterfield	United States / France
Submergence	Submergence	Wim Wenders	Germany / France / Spain
The Disaster Artist	The Disaster Artist	James Franco	United States
A Sort of Family	Una especie de familia	Diego Lerman	Argentina / Brazil / Poland / France

=== Out of competition ===
The following productions were screened out of competition:

English title	Original title	Director	Country
The Wife	The Wife	Björn Runge	United Kingdom / Sweden / United States
Marrowbone	Marrowbone	Sergio G. Sánchez	Spain / United States
The Plague	La peste	Alberto Rodríguez	Spain

The Wife was the festival's closing film. La peste was a television series, of which the first two episodes were screened.

=== Special screenings ===
The following films were presented as special screenings:

English title	Original title	Director(s)	Country
Dying	Morir	Fernando Franco	Spain
See You Up There	Au revoir là-haut	Albert Dupontel	France
Fireworks	Uchiage hanabi, shita kara miruka? Yoko kara miruka?	Akiyuki Shinbo, Nobuyuki Takeuchi	Japan
Wonders of the Sea 3D	Wonders of the Sea 3D	Jean-Michel Cousteau, Jean-Jacques Mantello	United Kingdom / France

== New Directors ==
The following films were selected for the New Directors section:

English title	Original title	Director(s)	Country
The Charmer	Charmøren	Milad Alami	Denmark
A Fish Out of Water	A Fish Out of Water	Lai Kuo-An	Taiwan
Alberto García-Alix. The Shadow Line	Alberto García-Alix. La línea de sombra	Nicolás Combarro	Spain
Apostasy	Apostasy	Daniel Kokotajlo	United Kingdom
Blue My Mind	Blue My Mind	Lisa Brühlmann	Switzerland
Cargo	Cargo	Gilles Coulier	Belgium / Netherlands / France
From Where We've Fallen	He ri jun zai lai	Wang Feifei	China
Ravens	Korparna	Jens Assur	Sweden
The Price of Success	Le prix du succès	Teddy Lussi-Modeste	France
The Sower	Le Semeur	Marine Francen	France
Killing Jesus	Matar a Jesús	Laura Mora	Colombia / Argentina
Underground	Pailalim	Daniel Palacio	Philippines
The Seeds of Violence	Pok-ryuk-eui Ssi-at	Lim Tae-gue	South Korea
Princess	Princesita	Marialy Rivas	Chile / Spain / Argentina
Tigre	Tigre	Silvina Schnicer, Ulises Porra Guardiola	Argentina
Village Rockstars	Village Rockstars	Rima Das	India

The Charmer was the opening film of the section. The Sower, directed by Marine Francen, received the Kutxabank-New Directors Award, while Killing Jesus, directed by Laura Mora, received a special mention.

== Horizontes Latinos ==
Twelve films were selected for the Horizontes Latinos section.

English title	Original title	Director(s)	Country
The Desert Bride	La novia del desierto	Cecilia Atán, Valeria Pivato	Argentina / Chile
A Fantastic Woman	Una mujer fantástica	Sebastián Lelio	Chile / Germany / Spain / United States
To the Desert	Al desierto	Ulises Rosell	Argentina / Chile
Araby	Arábia	Affonso Uchôa, João Dumans	Brazil
Cocote	Cocote	Nelson Carlo de los Santos Arias	Dominican Republic / Argentina / Germany / Qatar
Rey's Education	La educación del Rey	Santiago Esteves	Argentina / Spain
La familia	La familia	Gustavo Rondón Córdova	Venezuela / Chile / Norway
April's Daughter	Las hijas de Abril	Michel Franco	Mexico
The Waves	Las olas	Adrián Biniez	Uruguay / Argentina
Los perros	Los perros	Marcela Said	Chile / France
Medea	Medea	Alexandra Latishev	Costa Rica / Argentina / Chile
Hunting Season	Temporada de caza	Natalia Garagiola	Argentina / Germany / France / United States / Qatar

A Fantastic Woman, directed by Sebastián Lelio, opened the section in competition. Los perros, directed by Marcela Said, received the Horizontes Award.

== Zabaltegi-Tabakalera ==
The following works were selected for the Zabaltegi-Tabakalera section:

English title	Original title	Director(s)	Country
The Square	The Square	Ruben Östlund	Sweden
12 Days	12 jours	Raymond Depardon	France
3/4	3/4	Ilian Metev	Germany / Bulgaria
Braguino	Braguino	Clément Cogitore	France
Calipatria	Calipatria	Gerhard Treml, Leo Calice	Austria
El sueño de Ana	El sueño de Ana	José Luis Torres Leiva	Chile
Ex Libris: The New York Public Library	Ex Libris: The New York Public Library	Frederick Wiseman	United States
Flores	Flores	Jorge Jácome	Portugal
The Day After	Geu-hu	Hong Sang-soo	South Korea
Gwendolyn Green	Gwendolyn Green	Tamyka Smith	United States
Lover for a Day	L'amant d'un jour	Philippe Garrel	France
The Night I Swam	La nuit où j'ai nagé / Oyogisugita Yoru	Damien Manivel, Kohei Igarashi	France / Japan
Lots of Kids, a Monkey and a Castle	Muchos hijos, un mono y un castillo	Gustavo Salmerón	Spain
In the Intense Now	No intenso agora	João Moreira Salles	Brazil
Plague	Plágan	Koldo Almandoz	Spain
Plus Ultra	Plus Ultra	Helena Girón, Samuel M. Delgado	Spain
Saura(s)	Saura(s)	Félix Viscarret	Spain
Soldier	Soldado	Manuel Abramovich	Argentina
Spell Reel	Spell Reel	Filipa César	France
Shame	Sram	Petar Krumov	Bulgaria
Closeness	Tesnota	Kantemir Balagov	Russia
Vergüenza	Vergüenza	Juan Cavestany, Álvaro Fernández Armero	Spain

The Square, directed by Ruben Östlund, opened the section. Braguino, directed by Clément Cogitore, received the Zabaltegi-Tabakalera Award. Special mentions were given to actress Darya Zhovner for Closeness and to Filipa César's Spell Reel.

== Perlak ==
The following films were selected for the Perlak section, referred to by the festival in English at the time as "Pearls":

English title	Original title	Director(s)	Country
Happy End	Happy End	Michael Haneke	France / Austria / Germany
Custody	Jusqu'à la garde	Xavier Legrand	France
The House by the Sea	La Villa	Robert Guédiguian	France
Loveless	Nelyubov	Andrey Zvyagintsev	Russia / France / Belgium / Germany
The Third Murder	Sandome no satsujin	Hirokazu Kore-eda	Japan
Call Me by Your Name	Call Me by Your Name	Luca Guadagnino	Italy / France
Loving Pablo	Loving Pablo	Fernando León de Aranoa	Spain / Bulgaria
120 Beats per Minute	120 battements par minute	Robin Campillo	France
Borg McEnroe	Borg/McEnroe	Janus Metz	Sweden / Denmark / Finland
Mother!	Mother!	Darren Aronofsky	United States
On Body and Soul	Teströl és lélekröl	Ildikó Enyedi	Hungary
The Big Sick	The Big Sick	Michael Showalter	United States
The Florida Project	The Florida Project	Sean Baker	United States
The Leisure Seeker	The Leisure Seeker	Paolo Virzì	Italy
Three Billboards Outside Ebbing, Missouri	Three Billboards Outside Ebbing, Missouri	Martin McDonagh	United Kingdom
Wonderstruck	Wonderstruck	Todd Haynes	United States
You Were Never Really Here	You Were Never Really Here	Lynne Ramsay	United States / France

Call Me by Your Name opened the section, while Loving Pablo was the closing film and screened out of competition. The City of Donostia / San Sebastian Audience Award went to Three Billboards Outside Ebbing, Missouri, while Custody received the award for Best European Film.

== Made in Spain ==
The Made in Spain section presented eleven recent Spanish productions.

English title	Original title	Director(s)	Country
Analysis of Blue Blood	Análisis de sangre azul	Blanca Torres, Gabriel Velázquez	Spain
Sister of Mine	Demonios tus ojos	Pedro Aguilera	Spain / Colombia
The Bar	El bar	Álex de la Iglesia	Spain / Argentina
Summer 1993	Estiu 1993	Carla Simón	Spain
Uncertain Glory	Incerta glòria	Agustí Villaronga	Spain
Júlia Ist	Júlia Ist	Elena Martín	Spain
The Invisible Hand	La mano invisible	David Macián	Spain
Can't Say Goodbye	No sé decir adiós	Lino Escalera	Spain
Skins	Pieles	Eduardo Casanova	Spain
Selfie	Selfie	Víctor García León	Spain
Verónica	Verónica	Paco Plaza	Spain

== Awards ==
=== Official awards ===
The following awards were presented by the Official Selection jury:

- Golden Shell: The Disaster Artist – James Franco
- Special Jury Prize: Handia – Aitor Arregi and Jon Garaño
- Silver Shell for Best Director: Anahí Berneri – Alanis
- Silver Shell for Best Actress: Sofía Gala Castiglione – Alanis
  - Special mention: Anne Gruwez – So Help Me God
- Silver Shell for Best Actor: Bogdan Dumitrache – Pororoca
- Jury Prize for Best Screenplay: Diego Lerman and María Meira – A Sort of Family
- Jury Prize for Best Cinematography: Florian Ballhaus – The Captain

=== Other official awards ===
- Kutxabank-New Directors Award: The Sower – Marine Francen
  - Special mention: Killing Jesus – Laura Mora
- Horizontes Award: Los perros – Marcela Said
- Zabaltegi-Tabakalera Award: Braguino – Clément Cogitore
  - Special mention: Darya Zhovner for Closeness
  - Special mention: Spell Reel – Filipa César
- Irizar Basque Film Award: Handia – Aitor Arregi and Jon Garaño

== Donostia Awards ==
The recipients of the Donostia Award were:

- Ricardo Darín
- Agnès Varda
- Monica Bellucci
