= Rice flower =

Rice flower is an ambiguous plant name which may refer to:

== Pimelea plants ==
- Pimelea spicata, rice flower
- Pimelea spinescens subsp. spinescens, plains rice-flower or spiny rice-flower
- Pimelea linifolia ssp. linifolia, slender rice-flower or flax-leafed riceflower

== Other plants ==
- Ozothamnus diosmifolius (syn. Helichrysum diosmifolium)
- Aglaia odorata, Chinese rice flower (China)
- Rice

== See also ==
- The Taste of Rice Flower, a 2017 Chinese drama
