= 74th Venice International Film Festival =

Italian film festival in 2017

- Festival poster
- Opening film: Downsizing
- Closing film: Outrage Coda
- Location: Venice, Italy
- Founded: 1932
- Awards: Golden Lion: The Shape of Water
- Hosted by: Alessandro Borghi
- Artistic director: Alberto Barbera
- Festival date: 30 August – 9 September 2017
- Website: Website

Venice Film Festival chronology
- 75th 73rd

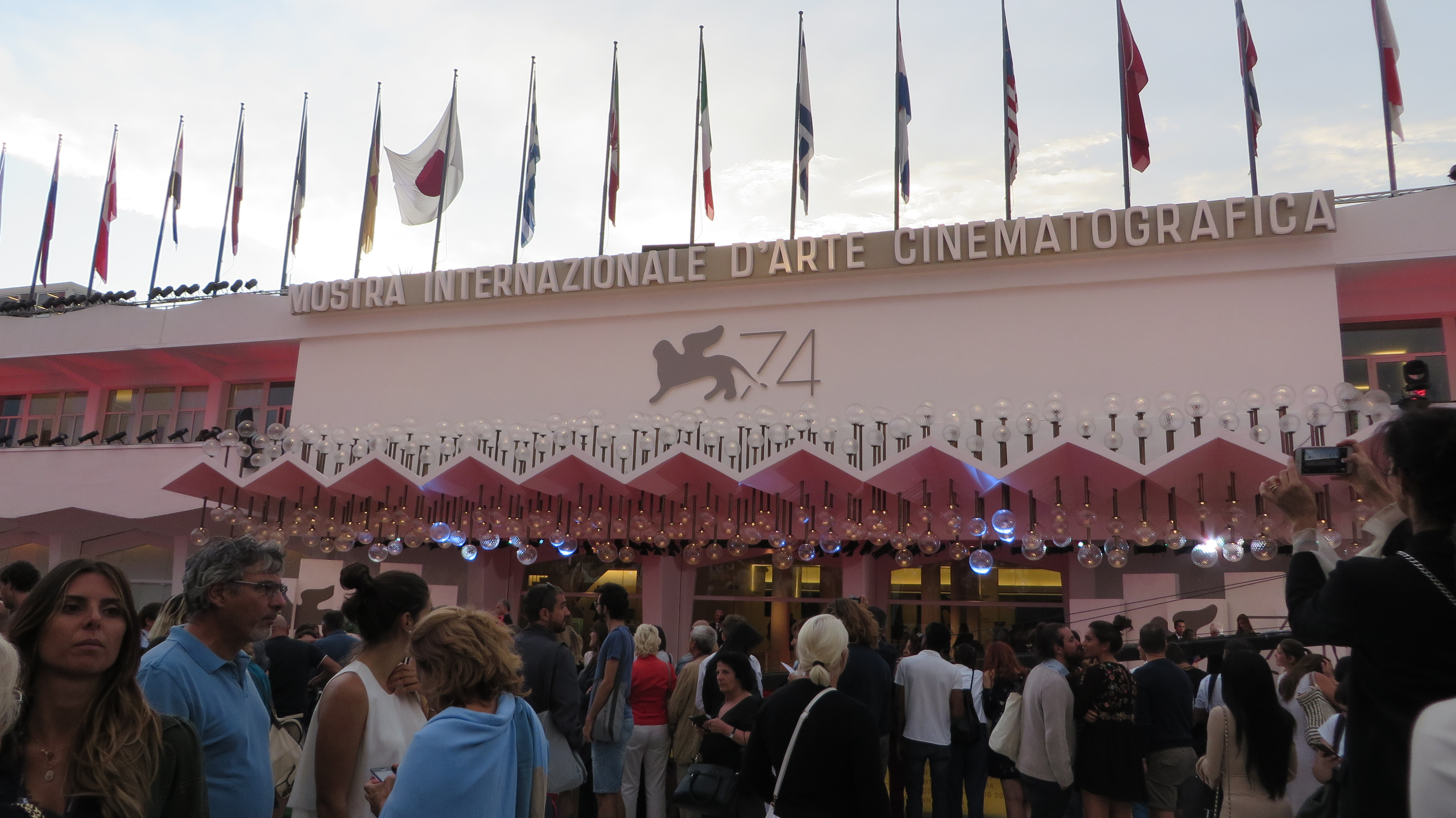
The main entrance of the Cinema Palace during the festival.

The 74th annual Venice International Film Festival was held from 30 August to 9 September 2017, at Venice Lido in Italy.

American actress Annette Bening was the jury president for the main competition. Italian actor Alessandro Borghi hosted the opening and closing nights of the festival. The Golden Lion was awarded to The Shape of Water by Guillermo del Toro.

A new section for virtual-reality (VR) films was introduced in this edition of the festival, as part of the Official Selection. 22 films were selected for the first-ever competition for films made in VR, while several more were presented in out-of-competition subsections.

The festival opened with Downsizing by Alexander Payne, and closed with Outrage Coda by Takeshi Kitano.

== Juries ==
=== Main Competition (Venezia 74) ===
- Annette Bening, American actress - Jury President
- Ildikó Enyedi, Hungarian filmmaker
- Michel Franco, Mexican filmmaker and producer
- Rebecca Hall, English actress
- Anna Mouglalis, French actress
- David Stratton, Anglo-Australian film critic
- Jasmine Trinca, Italian actress
- Edgar Wright, English filmmaker
- Yonfan, Taiwanese-Hong Kong filmmaker and producer

=== Orizzonti ===
- Gianni Amelio, Italian filmmaker - Jury President
- Rakhshān Banietemad, Iranian filmmaker
- Mark Cousins, Irish-Scottish filmmaker and curator
- Andrés Duprat, Argentinian screenwriter, architect and artistic curator
- Ami Canaan Mann, American filmmaker
- Fien Troch, Belgian filmmaker
- Rebecca Zlotowski, French filmmaker

=== Luigi De Laurentiis Award for a Debut Film ===
- Benoît Jacquot, French filmmaker - Jury President
- Geoff Andrew, British writer and lecturer on film
- Albert Lee, Hong Kong producer
- Greta Scarano, Italian television, stage and film actress
- Yorgos Zois, Greek director

=== Venice Classics ===
- Giuseppe Piccioni, Italian filmmaker - Jury President
- 26 students of Cinema History

=== Venice Virtual Reality ===
- John Landis, American filmmaker, actor and producer - Jury President
- Céline Sciamma, French filmmaker
- Ricky Tognazzi, Italian actor and filmmaker

== Official Sections ==
=== In Competition ===
The following films were selected for the main competition:

English title	Original title	Director(s)	Production country
Angels Wear White	嘉年华	Vivian Qu	China, France
Custody	Jusqu'à la garde	Xavier Legrand	France
Downsizing (opening film)		Alexander Payne	United States
Ex Libris: The New York Public Library		Frederick Wiseman	United States
A Family	Una famiglia	Sebastiano Riso	Italy
First Reformed		Paul Schrader	United States
Foxtrot	פוֹקְסטְרוֹט	Samuel Maoz	Israel, Germany, France, Switzerland
Hannah		Andrea Pallaoro	Italy, Belgium, France
The House by the Sea	La villa	Robert Guédiguian	France
Human Flow		Ai Weiwei	Germany
The Insult	قضية رقم ٢٣	Ziad Doueiri	France, Lebanon
Lean on Pete		Andrew Haigh	United Kingdom
The Leisure Seeker		Paolo Virzì	Italy, France
Love and Bullets	Ammore e malavita	Antonio Manetti and Marco Manetti	Italy
Mektoub, My Love: Canto Uno		Abdellatif Kechiche	France, Italy
Mother!		Darren Aronofsky	United States
The Shape of Water		Guillermo del Toro	United States
Suburbicon		George Clooney	United States
Sweet Country		Warwick Thornton	Australia
The Third Murder	三度目の殺人	Hirokazu Kore-eda	Japan
Three Billboards Outside Ebbing, Missouri		Martin McDonagh	United Kingdom

=== Out of Competition ===
The following films were selected to be screened out of competition:

English title	Original title	Director(s)	Production country
Fiction
Brawl in Cell Block 99		S. Craig Zahler	United States
Il colore nascosto delle cose		Silvio Soldini	Italy
Diva!		Francesco Patierno	Italy
Loving Pablo		Fernando León de Aranoa	Spain, Bulgaria
Manhunt	追捕	John Woo	Hong Kong, China
Orchestra Class	La mélodie	Rachid Hami	France
Mr Rotpeter	Il signor Rotpeter	Antonietta De Lillo	Italy
Our Souls at Night		Ritesh Batra	United States
Outrage Coda (closing film)	アウトレイジ 最終章	Takeshi Kitano	Japan
An Imperfect Murder	The Private Life of a Modern Woman	James Toback	United States
Racer and the Jailbird	Le Fidèle	Michaël R. Roskam	Belgium, France, Netherlands
Victoria & Abdul		Stephen Frears	United Kingdom
Wormwood (miniseries)		Errol Morris	United States
Zama		Lucrecia Martel	Argentina, Brazil
Non Fiction
Cuba and the Cameraman		Jon Alpert	United States
The Devil and Father Amorth		William Friedkin	United States
Happy Winter	Buon inverno	Giovanni Totaro	Italy
Jim & Andy: The Great Beyond		Chris Smith	United States, Canada
My Generation		David Batty	United Kingdom
Piazza Vittorio		Abel Ferrara	Italy
Ryuichi Sakamoto: Coda		Stephen Nomura Schible	United States, Japan
This Is Congo		Daniel McCabe	Democratic Republic of the Congo
Special Events
Casa d’altri		Gianni Amelio	Italy
Michael Jackson’s Thriller 3D		John Landis	United States
Making of Michael Jackson’s Thriller		Jerry Kramer	United States

=== Orizzonti ===
The following films were selected for the Horizons (Orizzonti) section:

English title	Original title	Director(s)	Production country
In Competition
The Blessed	Les Bienheureux	Sofia Djama	France, Belgium
Caniba		Véréna Paravel and Lucien Castaing-Taylor	France
Cinderella the Cat	Gatta Cenerentola	Alessandro Rak, Ivan Cappiello, Marino Guarnieri and Dario Sansone	Italy
The Cousin	הבן דוד	Tzahi Grad	Israel
Disappearance	ناپدید شدن	Ali Asgari	Iran, Qatar
Endangered Species	Espèces menacées	Gilles Bourdos	France, Belgium
Invisible		Pablo Giorgelli	Argentina, Brazil, Uruguay, Germany, France
Krieg		Rick Ostermann	Germany
Nico, 1988		Susanna Nicchiarelli	Italy, Belgium
The Night I Swam	泳ぎすぎた夜	Damien Manivel and Igarashi Kohei	France, Japan
No Date, No Signature	بدون تاریخ، بدون امضاء	Vahid Jalilvand	Iran
Oblivion Verses	Los Versos del Olvido	Alireza Khatami	France, Germany, Netherlands, Chile
The Rape of Recy Taylor		Nancy Buirski	United States
Reinventing Marvin	Marvin ou la belle éducation	Anne Fontaine	France
The Testament	העדות	Amichai Greenberg	Israel, Austria
Ugly Nasty People	Brutti e cattivi	Cosimo Gomez	Italy, France
Under the Tree	Undir trénu	Hafsteinn Gunnar Sigurðsson	Iceland, Denmark, Poland, Germany
La Vita in Comune		Edoardo Winspeare	Italy
West of Sunshine		Jason Raftopoulos	Australia
Short Films Competition
Aria		Myrsini Aristidou	Cyprus, France
Astrometal		Efthimis Kosemund Sanidis	Greece
By the Pool		Laurynas Bareiša	Lithuania
Death Of The Sound Man	Awasarn Sound Man	Sorayos Prapapan	Thailand, Myanmar
Gros Chagrin		Céline Devaux	France
Himinn Opinn		Gabriel Sanson, Clyde Gates	Belgium
It’s Easier to Raise Cattle	Lagi senang jaga sekandang lembu	Amanda Nell Eu	Malaysia
The Knife Salesman		Michael Leonard and Jamie Helmer	Australia
Meninas Formicida		João Paulo Miranda María	France, Brazil
Mon Amour, Mon Ami		Adriano Valerio	Italy
The Shadow of the Bride	L’ombra della sposa	Alessandra Pescetta	Italy
Tierra Mojada		Juan Sebastián Mesa Bedoya	Colombia
Short films - Out of Competition
8th Continent		Yorgos Zois	Greece
Futuro prossimo		Salvatore Mereu	Italy

=== Venice Classics ===
The following films were selected to be screened in the Venice Classics section:

English title	Original title	Director(s)	Production country
Restored films
1900 (1976)	Novecento	Bernardo Bertolucci	Italy
The Ape Woman (1964)	La donna scimmia	Marco Ferreri	Italy, France
Batch '81 (1982)	Alpha Kappa Omega Batch '81	Mike De Leon	Philippines
Black Peter (1963)	Černý Petr	Miloš Forman	Czechoslovakia
Close Encounters of the Third Kind (1977)		Steven Spielberg	United States
Come and See (1985)	Иди и смотри	Elem Klimov	Soviet Union
Cousin, Cousine (1987)		Jean Rouch	France
The Crucified Lovers (1954)	近松物語	Kenji Mizoguchi	Japan
Daïnah la métisse (1931)		Jean Grémillon	France
The Flavor of Green Tea Over Rice (1952)	お茶漬けの味	Yasujirō Ozu	Japan
El Haimoune (1984)	الهائمون	Nacer Khemir	Tunisia, France
Into the Night (1985)		John Landis	United States
The Old Dark House (1932)		James Whale	United States
Red Desert (1964)	Il deserto rosso	Michelangelo Antonioni	Italy
The Revolt of Mamie Stover (1956)		Raoul Walsh	United States
Rosita (1923)		Ernst Lubitsch	United States
Sansho the Bailiff (1954)	山椒大夫	Kenji Mizoguchi	Japan
The Third Lover (1962)	L'Œil du malin	Claude Chabrol	France
Two or Three Things I Know About Her (1967)	Deux ou trois choses que je sais d’elle	Jean-Luc Godard	France
Under the Olive Tree (1950)	Non c’è pace tra gli ulivi	Giuseppe De Santis	Italy
Zero for Conduct (1933)	Zéro de conduite	Jean Vigo	France
Documentaries on cinema
Dangerous But Necessary	La Lucida Follia Di Marco Ferreri	Anselma Dell’Olio	Italy, France
Evviva Giuseppe		Stefano Consiglio	Switzerland, Italy
Light Years	Años Luz	Manuel Abramovich	Argentina, Brazil, Spain
L’enigma di Jean Rouch a Torino - Cronaca di un film raté		Marco Di Castri, Paolo Favaro, Daniele Pianciola	Italy, France
The Russian Revolution Through Its Films	L’utopie des images de la Révolution Russe	Emmanuel Hamon	France
The Prince and the Dybbuk		Elwira Niewiera, Piotr Rosołowski	Poland, Germany
This Is The War Room!		Boris Hars-Tschachotin	Germany
La Voce Di Fantozzi		Mario Sesti	Italy

=== Biennale College - Cinema ===
The following films were selected for the Biennale College - Cinema section.

Title	Director(s)	Production Country
Beautiful Things	Giorgio Ferrero	Italy
Martyr	Mazen Khaled	Lebanon
Strange Colours	Alena Lodkina	Australia

=== Il Cinema nel Giardino ===
The following films were selected for the Il Cinema nel Giardino section:

English title	Original title	Director(s)	Production country
Controfigura		Rä di Martino	Italy, France, Switzerland, Morocco
Manuel		Dario Albertini	Italy
Nato a Casal di Principe		Bruno Oliviero	Italy, Spain
Suburra: Blood on Rome	Suburra - La serie	Michele Placido, Andrea Molaioli and Giuseppe Capotondi	Italy
Above the Law	Tueurs	François Troukens and Jean-François Hensgens	Belgium, France
Woodshock		Kate and Laura Mulleavy	United States

=== Special Screenings ===
The following films were presented as Special screening of the Official Selection:

English title	Original title	Director(s)	Production country
Barbiana '65: La lezione di Don Milani		Alessandro G.A. D’Alessandro	Italy
The Electric Horseman (1979)		Sydney Pollack	United States
Lievito madre: Le ragazze del secolo scorso		Concita De Gregorio, Esmeralda Calabria	Italy
La lunga strada del ritorno (1962)		Alessandro Blasetti	Italy
The Order of Things	L’ordine delle cose	Andrea Segre	Italy, France

== Independent Sections ==
=== Venice International Critics' Week ===
The following films were selected for the 32nd Venice International Critics' Week:

English title	Original title	Director(s)	Production country
In competition
Crater	Il Cratere	Luca Bellino and Silvia Luzi	Italy
Drift		Helena Wittmann	Germany
The Gulf	Körfez	Emre Yeksan	Turkey, Germany, Greece
Hunting Season	Temporada de caza	Natalia Garagiola	Argentina, United States, Germany, France, Qatar
Sarah Plays a Werewolf	Sarah joue un loup garou	Katharina Wyss	Switzerland, Germany
Team Hurricane		Annika Berg	Denmark
The Wild Boys	Les garçons sauvages	Bertrand Mandico	France
Special Events - Out of competition
Pin Cushion (Opening film)		Deborah Haywood	United Kingdom
Poison (Closing film)	Veleno	Diego Olivares	Italy
SIC@SIC 2017 (Short Italian Cinema @ Settimana Internazionale della Critica)
Adavede		Alain Parroni	Italy
Two	Due	Riccardo Giacconi	Italy
Ghosts of Yesterday	Les fantômes de la veille	Manuel Billi	Italy
The Legionnaire	Il legionario	Hleb Papou	Italy
MeanMinds	MalaMènti	Francesco Di Leva	Italy
Little Italian Girls	Piccole italiane	Letizia Lamartire	Italy
Visiting Day	Le visite	Elio Di Pace	Italy
SIC@SIC 2017 (Short Italian Cinema @ Settimana Internazionale della Critica) - Special Events
Nausicaa - The Other Odyssey (Opening Short Film)	Nausicaa L'altra odissea	Bepi Vigna	Italy
The Last Miracle (Closing Short Film)	L’ultimo miracolo'	Enrico Pau	Italy

=== Giornate degli Autori ===
The following films were selected for the 14th edition of the Giornate degli Autori section:

English title	Original title	Director(s)	Production country
In Competition
Candelaria		Jhonny Hendrix Hinestroza	Colombia, Germany, Norway, Argentina, Cuba
Equilibrium	L'equilibrio	Vincenzo Marra	Italy
Eye on Juliet		Kim Nguyen	Canada
Life Guidance		Ruth Mader	Austria
Longing	געגוע	Savi Gabizon	Israel
Looking for Oum Kulthum		Shirin Neshat	Germany, Austria, Italy, Lebanon, Qatar
M		Sara Forestier	France
Samui Song	ไม่มีสมุยสำหรับเธอ	Pen-ek Ratanaruang	Thailand, Germany, Norway
Tainted Souls	Il contagio	Matteo Botrugno and Daniele Coluccini	Italy
The Taste of Rice Flower	米花之味	Pengfei	China
Volubilis		Faouzi Bensaïdi	Morocco, France, Qatar
Where the Shadows Fall	Dove cadono le ombre	Valentina Pedicini	Italy
Special events
Agnelli		Nick Hooker	United States
Getting Naked: A Burlesque Story		James Lester	United States
La legge del numero uno		Alessandro D'Alatri	Italy
The Resolute	Il risoluto	Giovanni Donfrancesco	Italy, France
Il tentato suicidio nell'adolescenza (T.S. Giovanile)		Ermanno Olmi	Italy
Thirst Street		Nathan Silver	France, United States
Miu Miu Women's Tales
Carmen		Chloë Sevigny	United States
(The [end) of history illusion]		Celia Rowlson-Hall	United States
Special Screenings
Aquagranda in crescendo		Giovanni Pellegrini	Italy
Buried Seeds		Andrei Severny	United States
I'm (Endless Like the Space)		Anne-Riitta Ciccone	Italy
The Millionairs		Claudio Santamaria	Italy
Raccontare Venezia		Wilma Labate	Italy, France
Lux Award
BPM (Beats per Minute)	120 battements par minute	Robin Campillo	France
Sami Blood	Sameblod	Amanda Kernell	Sweden
Western		Valeska Grisebach	Germany, Austria, Bulgaria

== Official Awards ==
=== In Competition (Venezia 74) ===
- Golden Lion: The Shape of Water by Guillermo del Toro
- Grand Jury Prize: Foxtrot by Samuel Maoz
- Silver Lion: Custody by Xavier Legrand
- Volpi Cup for Best Actress: Charlotte Rampling for Hannah
- Volpi Cup for Best Actor: Kamel El Basha for The Insult
- Best Screenplay: Three Billboards Outside Ebbing, Missouri by Martin McDonagh
- Special Jury Prize: Sweet Country by Warwick Thornton
- Marcello Mastroianni Award: Charlie Plummer for Lean on Pete

=== Horizons (Orizzonti) ===
- Best Film: Nico, 1988 by Susanna Nicchiarelli
- Best Director: No Date, No Signature by Vahid Jalilvand
- Special Jury Prize: Caniba by Verena Paravel and Lucien Castaing-Taylor
- Best Actress: Lyna Khoudri for The Blessed
- Best Actor: Navid Mohammadzadeh for No Date, No Signature
- Best Screenplay: Oblivion Verses by Alireza Khatami
- Horizons Prize for Best Short: Gros Chagrin by Céline Devaux

=== Luigi De Laurentis Award for a Debut Film (Lion of the Future) ===
- Custody by Xavier Legrand

=== Venice Classics (Venezia Classici) ===
- Best Documentary on Cinema: The Prince and the Dybbuk by Elwira Niewiera and Piotr Rosolowski
- Best Restored Film: Come and See by Elem Klimov

=== Golden Lion for Lifetime Achievement ===
- Robert Redford
- Jane Fonda

== Independent Sections Awards ==
The following collateral awards were conferred to films of the autonomous sections:

=== Venice International Critics' Week ===
- SIAE Audience Award: Hunting Season by Natalia Garagiola
- Verona Film Club Award: Team Hurricane by Annika Berg
- Mario Serandrei – Hotel Saturnia Award for the Best Technical Contribution: The Wild Boys by Bertrand Mandico
- SIAE Award: Saverio Costanzo
- Mention FEDIC - Il giornale del cibo: Visiting Day by Elio Di Pace

=== Giornate degli Autori ===
- GdA Director's Award: Candelaria by Jhonny Hendrix Hinestroza
- BNL People's Choice Award: Longing by Savi Gabizon
- Europa Cinemas Label Award: M by Sara Forestier
- Fedeora Awards
  - Best Film: Eye on Juliet by Kim Nguyen
  - Best Director of a Debut Film: Sara Forestier for M
  - Best Actor: Redouanne Harjane for M
- Nuovo Imaie Talent Award
  - Federica Rosellini for her role in Where the Shadows Fall
  - Mimmo Borrelli for his role in Equilibrium
- Edipo Re Award: Valentina Pedicini for Where the Shadows Fall
- Lanterna Magica Award: Equilibrium by Vincenzo Marra

== Independent Awards ==
The following collateral awards were conferred to films of the official selection:

=== Queer Lion ===
- Reinventing Marvin by Anne Fontaine

=== Arca CinemaGiovani Award ===
- Venezia 74 Best Film: Foxtrot by Samuel Maoz
- Best Italian Film: Beautiful Things by Giorgio Ferrero

=== Brian Award ===
- Les Bienheureux by Sofia Djama

=== "Civitas Vitae prossima" Award ===
- Il colore nascosto delle cose by Silvio Soldini

=== Fair Play Cinema Award ===
- Ex Libris: The New York Public Library by Frederick Wiseman
  - Special mention: Human Flow by Ai Weiwei

=== FEDIC (Federazione Italiana dei Cineclub) Award ===
- La Vita in Comune by Edoardo Winspeare
  - Special mention: Nico, 1988 by Susanna Nicchiarelli

=== FIPRESCI Awards ===
- Best Film (Main competition): Ex Libris: The New York Public Library by Frederick Wiseman
- Best Film (Horizons): Oblivion Verses by Alireza Khatami

=== Fondazione Mimmo Rotella Award ===
- George Clooney for Suburbicon
- Ai Weiwei for Human Flow
- Michael Caine for My Generation

=== Enrico Fulchignoni – CICT-UNESCO Award ===
- Human Flow by Ai Weiwei

=== Future Film Festival Digital Award ===
- The Shape of Water by Guillermo del Toro
  - Special mention: Cinderella the Cat by Alessandro Rak, Ivan Cappiello, Marino Guarnieri, Dario Sansone

=== Green Drop Award ===
- First Reformed by Paul Schrader

=== HRNs Award – Special Prize for Human Rights ===
- The Rape of Recy Taylor by Nancy Buirski
  - Special mention: L'ordine delle cose by Andrea Segre
  - Special mention: Human Flow by Ai Weiwei

=== Interfilm Award ===
- Oblivion Verses by Alireza Khatami

=== Lanterna Magica Award (CGS) ===
- Equilibrium by Vincenzo Marra

=== La Pellicola d’Oro Award ===
- Best Production Manager in an Italian Film: Daniele Spinozzi for Love and Bullets
- Best Production Manager in an International Film: Riccardo Marchegiani for Mektoub, My Love: Canto Uno
- Best Stagehand: Roberto Di Pietro for Hannah

=== Leoncino d'Oro Agiscuola per il Cinema Award ===
- The Leisure Seeker by Paolo Virzì

=== Cinema for UNICEF Award ===
- Human Flow by Ai Weiwei

=== Lizzani Award ===
- Il colore nascosto delle cose by Silvio Soldini

=== Lina Mangiacapre Award ===
- Les Bienheureux by Sofia Djama

=== Golden Mouse ===
- Mektoub, My Love: Canto Uno by Abdellatif Kechiche
- Silver Mouse: Gatta Cenerentola by Alessandro Rak, Ivan Cappiello, Marino Guarnieri, Dario Sansone

=== NuovoImaie Talent Award ===
- Best Actress: Federica Rosellini for Where the Shadows Fall
- Best Actor: Mimmo Borrelli for Equilibrium

=== Open Award ===
- Gatta Cenerentola by Alessandro Rak, Ivan Cappiello, Marino Guarnieri, Dario Sansone

=== Francesco Pasinetti Awards ===
- Best film: Love and Bullets by Antonio Manetti, Marco Manetti
- Best Cast: Giampaolo Morelli, Serena Rossi, Claudia Gerini, Carlo Buccirosso, Raiz, Franco Ricciardi, Antonio Buonomo for Love and Bullets
  - Special award: Cinderella the Cat by Alessandro Rak, Ivan Cappiello, Marino Guarnieri, Dario Sansone
  - Special award: Nico, 1988 by Susanna Nicchiarelli

=== Sfera 1932 Award ===
- La mélodie by Rachid Hami

=== SIGNIS Award ===
- The House by the Sea by Robert Guédiguian
  - Special mention: Foxtrot by Samuel Maoz

=== C. Smithers Foundation Award – CICT-UNESCO ===
- The Shape of Water by Guillermo del Toro

=== Sorriso Diverso Venezia 2017 Award - Ass Ucl ===
- Il colore nascosto delle cose by Silvio Soldini

=== Soundtrack Stars Award ===
- Alexandre Desplat for The Shape of Water
  - Special award: Love and Bullets
- Lifetime Achievement Award: Andrea Guerra

=== UNIMED Award ===
- The House by the Sea by Robert Guédiguian
  - Special mention: Ugly Nasty People by Cosimo Gomez

=== Fragiacomo Award ===
- George Clooney for Suburbicon
- Ai Weiwei for Human Flow
- Michael Caine for My Generation

=== Robert Bresson Award ===
- Gianni Amelio

=== Franca Sozzani Award ===
- Julianne Moore for Suburbicon
