= Solomon Heights =

Section of Sunshine North, Melbourne, Australia

Solomon Heights is a section of Sunshine North, consisting of 32.8 hectares of land located 10 km from the centre of Melbourne. It is bound by Baldwin Avenue, Munro Avenue, Vermont Avenue, and the Sydney–Melbourne rail corridor, in the form of the Albion–Jacana railway line. The area is named after Michael Solomon, one of the first European settlers in Victoria, who had a sheep station in the area in the 1830s. Nearby, Solomon’s Ford, which was once an important crossing over the Maribyrnong River, also bears his name.

Solomon Heights is significant for its lack of development compared with adjacent suburbs, despite being subdivided into 435 lots during the 1920s. As of 2013, the area lacked sealed roads, drainage and power. Numerous reasons are cited for the lack of development activity in the Solomon Heights area, in particular, its status as a significant local grassland, as well as various infrastructure constraints.

== Site history ==
The site consists of 435 lots with 135 land-owners. It was originally zoned for industrial use and development, but development interest was quickly lost due to a number of factors. In particular, the lot sizes were not appropriate for most industrial use, whereas those in the adjacent Sunshine North industrial estate were larger.

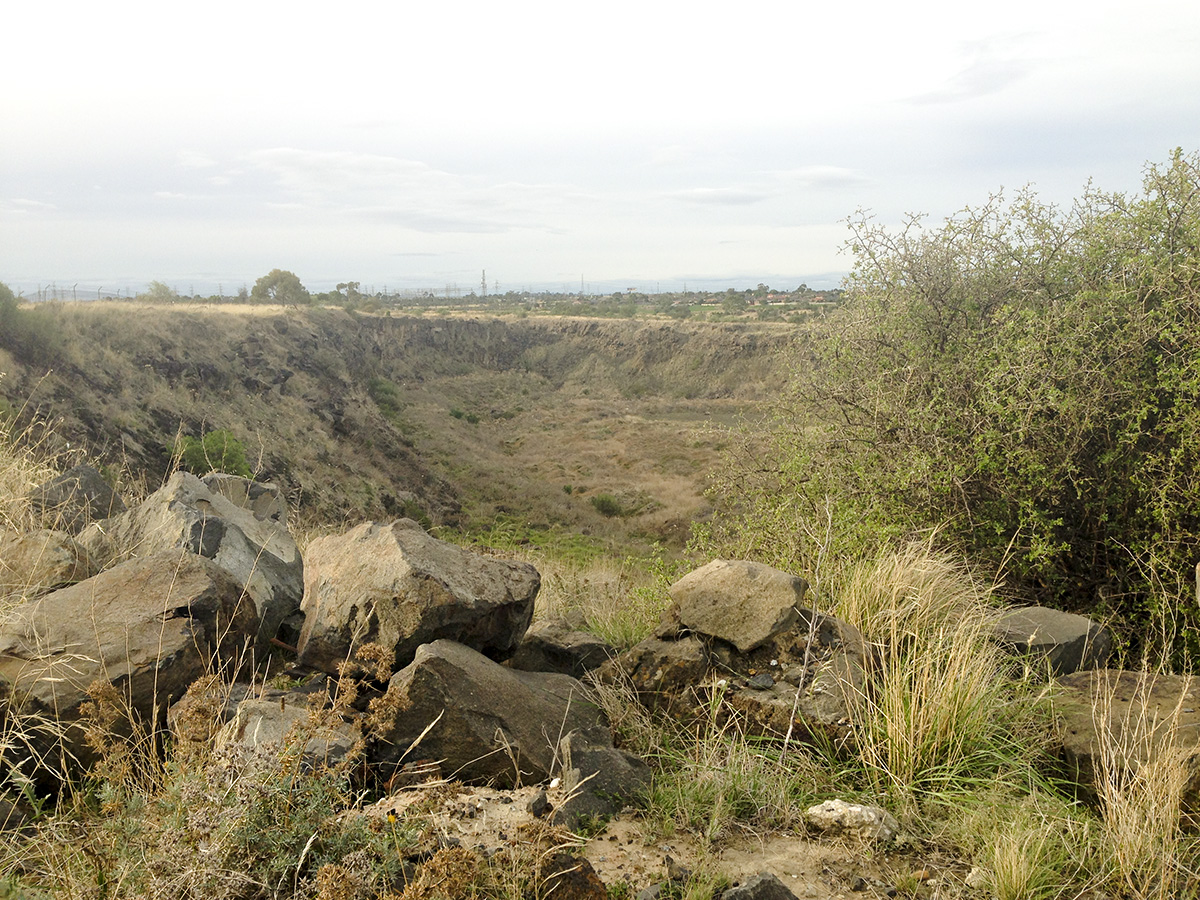
Partially excavated quarry

Despite its proximity to the Western Ring Road, traffic movement in the area is limited by the Albion–Jacana railway line, resulting in the congestion of local connecting roads and access points. That has rendered Solomon Heights an undesirable location for an industrial precinct. Many landowners chose to retain their properties, continuing to pay municipal charges, as well as water rates, despite their lots not being serviced.

The geology of the site led to quarry development in the 1970s, with three full-scale quarries and one partial quarry dug for the excavation of rock fragments for gravel.

== Present day ==
The site has recently been identified as an important "strategic site" within the municipality of Brimbank. It also contains a large number of disused quarries.

=== Biodiversity ===
The site includes 14.4 hectares which are considered to be of "state and national significance" due to the presence of several endangered plant species, escarpment scrubland, and a river red gum woodland bioregion. The area is considered one of the most threatened in the state by housing development.

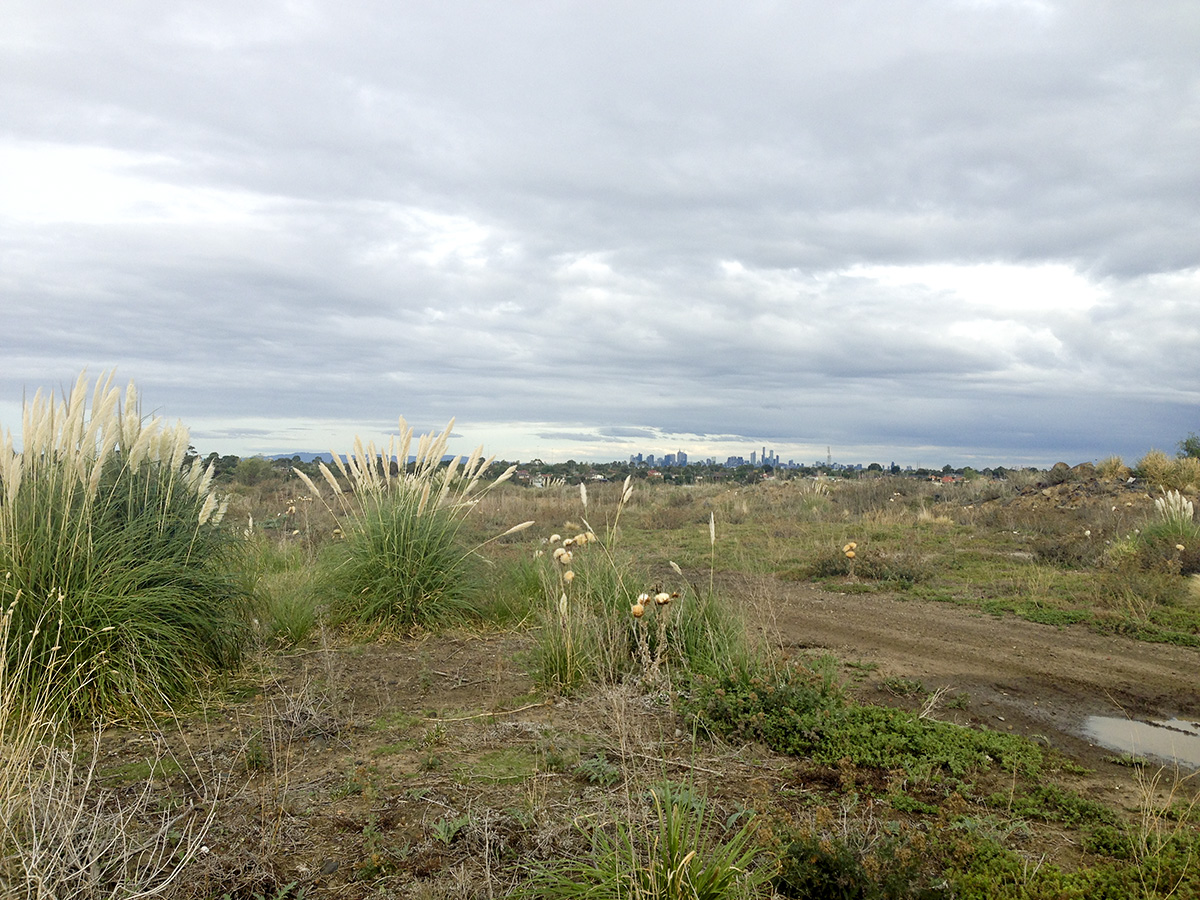
Grasslands looking towards Melbourne

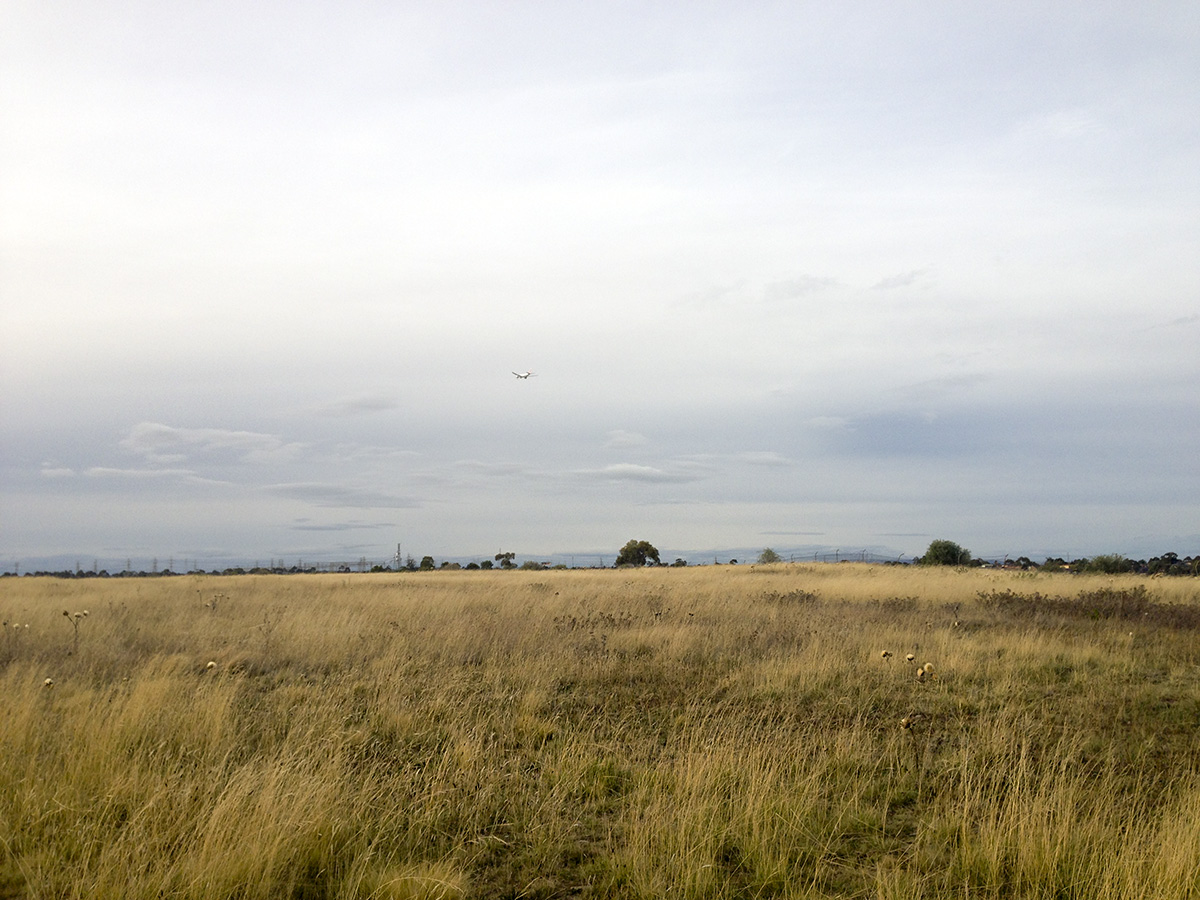
Native grasslands, towards Tullamarine Airport

The site contains 75 specimens of the endangered pimelea spinescens, 2% of the remaining population, and is 0.6-0.8% of all remaining basalt plains grassland. The significance of this has resulted in much discourse on the future of the site, such as the suggestion of establishing a Western Grassland Reserve to protect native flora and fauna from inappropriate development.

The City of Brimbank is seeking to preserve and enhance biodiversity with an environmental significance overlay, alongside the introduction of a Natural Heritage Policy in Clause 22.06 of the Brimbank Planning Scheme. However, this lies at odds with separate municipal policy decreeing the location an "important strategic site" with potential for mixed use development.

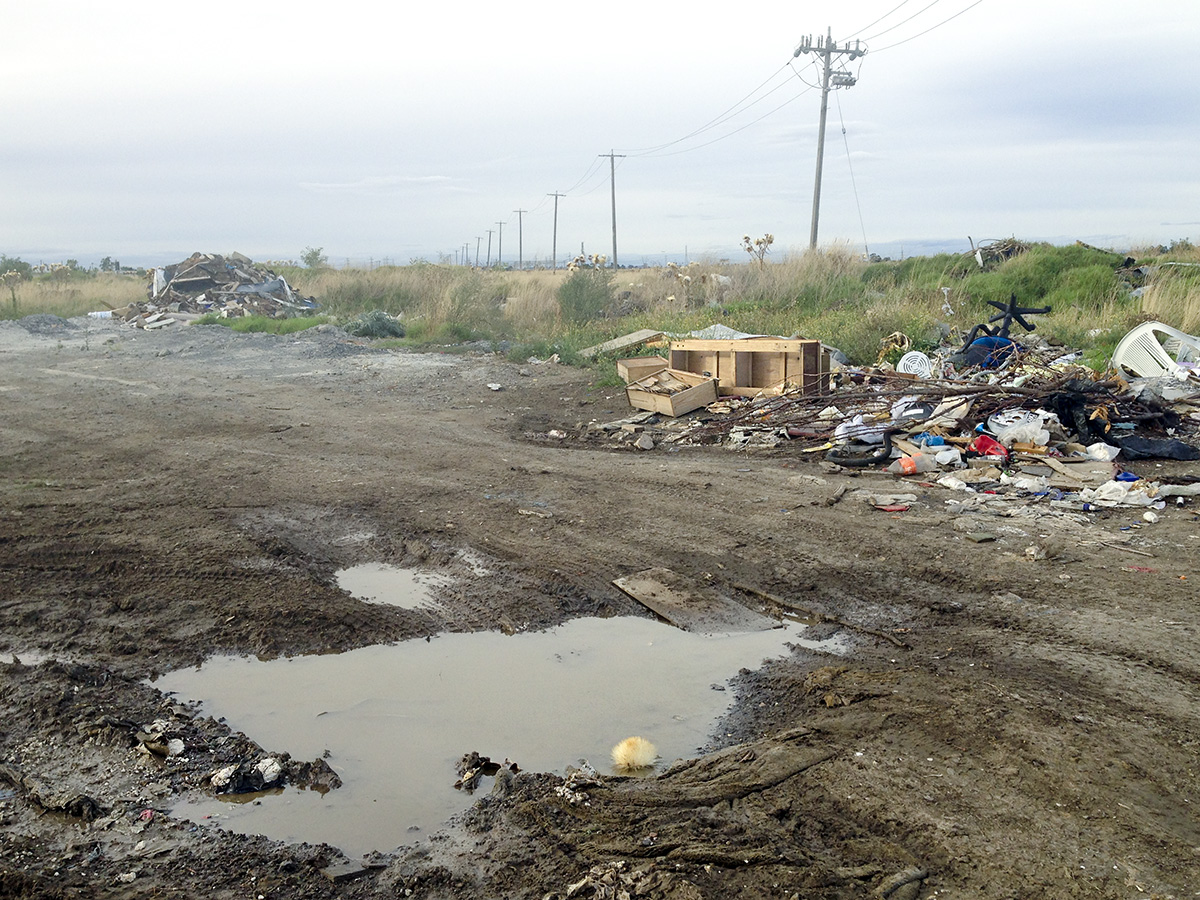
Illegal rubbish dumping

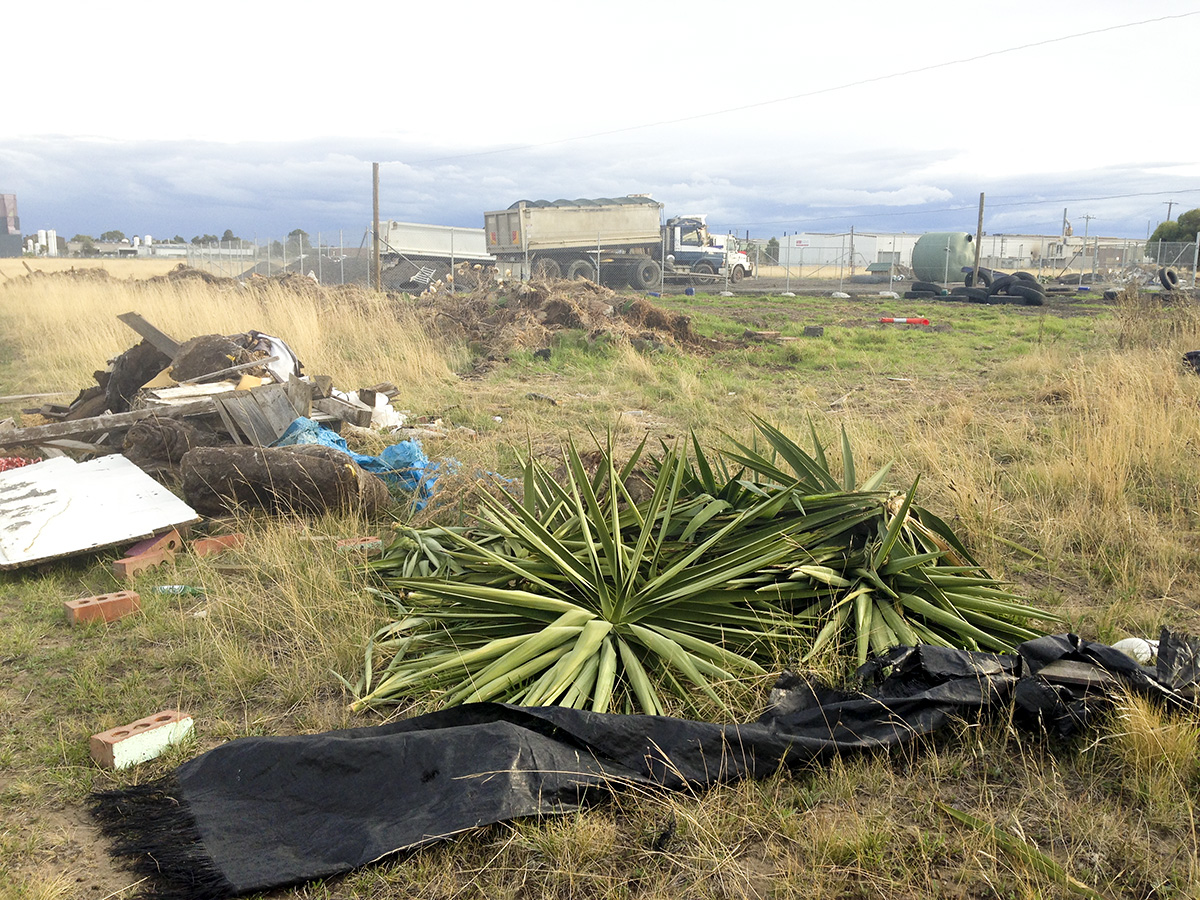
Unlawful industrial land use, potentially damaging significant basalt plains grassland

The site is envisioned as an attempt at whole-Council "place based" design, planning and management, with development as a residential or industrial estate with native grassland offset a distinct possibility. Due to the lack of development and isolation, the site is at high risk for vandalism, trail bike riders and illegal dumping, all of which negatively impact the sensitive grasslands - recently, there has been illegal industrial use on the land, potentially damaging fragile native flora.

=== Infrastructure ===
Another constraint for development in the precinct is the Albion-Jacana freight railway line. The line borders the western boundary of Solomon Heights, rendering Bunnett St the only access point to the site, because a bridge is required to allow for unobstructed rail operations. This is further complicated by the presence of the Somerton Pipeline, which runs alongside the Albion-Jacana railway line. This pipeline carries 85% of the fuel utilised at Melbourne Airport, from the Altona Refinery to storage in Somerton.

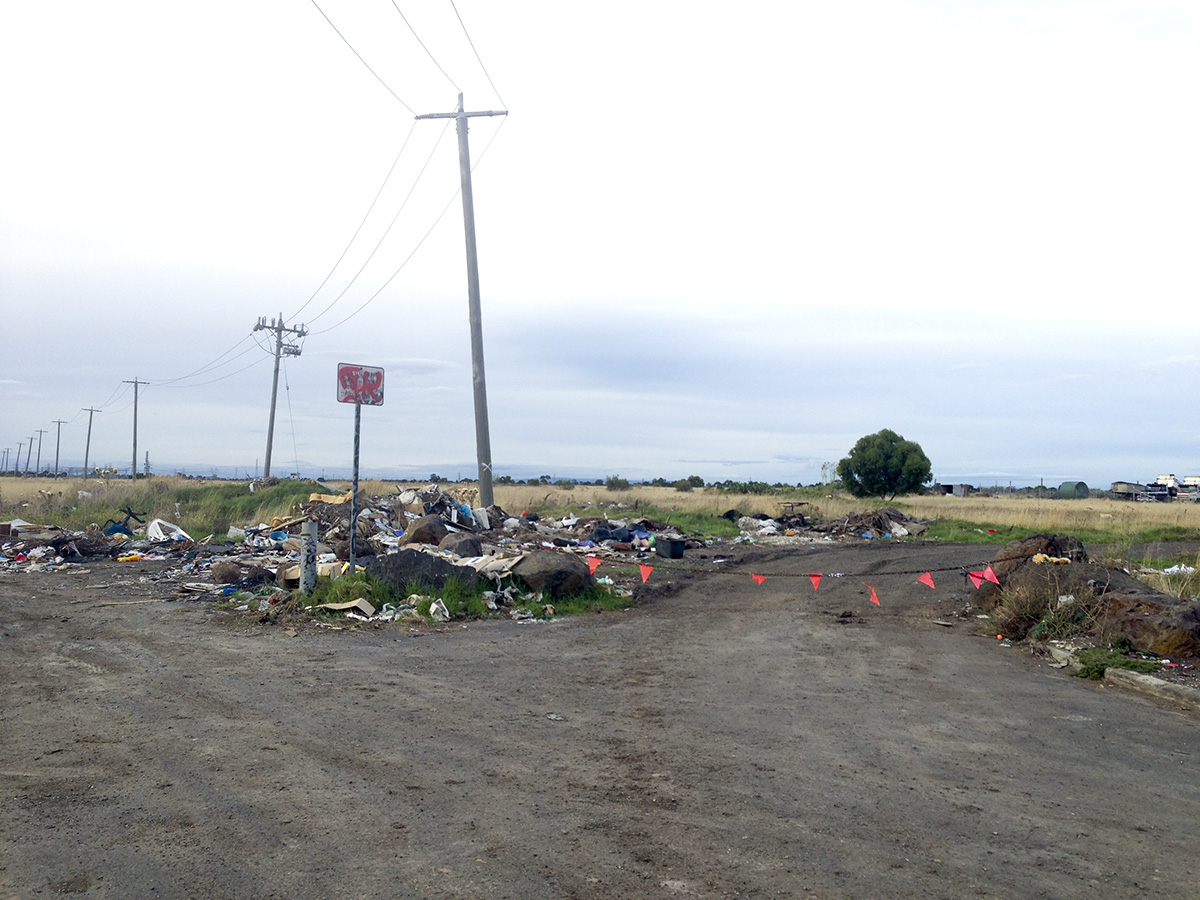
Corner of Bunnett St and Munro Ave, the only roadway which enters into Solomon Heights

The pipeline was constructed in the 1970s by the Victorian Railways, long after the subdivision of Solomon Heights. Its presence means that a development plan, inclusive of any work or construction on the site such as road infrastructure or alterations to the railway, requires a permit under Schedule 11 of to the Development Plan Overlay. That particularly concerns infrastructure works such as the proposed Melbourne Airport rail link, which could render the site more feasible for future development.

== Future development ==
Current landowners are concerned about devaluation of their properties resulting from these development constraints. The future of a mixed-use estate on the Solomon Heights site is still unclear. Environmental planning controls for the site must be resolved in the interests of protecting native grasslands, allowing for the control of environmental threats in view of future development. The site requires a design and planning response which overcomes constraints placed on it by its location, and adequately meets the needs of present land-owners and future municipality growth, whilst protecting the fragile grasslands which typify it.
