= Çiğdem Mater =

Turkish film producer and journalist

- Occupations: Film producer, journalist
- Years active: 2010–present
- Known for: Arrest by Turkish government
- Notable work: Human Flow
- Spouse: Murat Utku (m. 2004)

Çiğdem Mater is a Turkish film producer and journalist. She was one of 13 civil society figures arrested in November 2018 by the Turkish government in connection to the crackdown against people and organisations connected to philanthropist Osman Kavala and the 2013 Gezi Park protests.

Mater acted as producer on Ai Weiwei's 2017 documentary Human Flow, as well as Turkish films Majority, Sivas and Toz Bezi.

In November 2018, Mater was one of 13 civil society activists, most connected with the philanthropic organisation Anadolu Kultur, who were detained by police in connection to the investigation to jailed philanthropist Osman Kavala. Amnesty International's Andrew Gardner commented on the arrests that,

"This latest wave of detentions of academics and activists, on the basis of absurd allegations, shows that the authorities are intent on continuing their brutal crackdown of independent civil society".

The Turkish government alleges that those involved in the protests sought to overthrow the government of then Prime Minister, now President Recep Tayyip Erdoğan. Pro-government Turkish newspaper Daily Sabah reported that the activists had been arrested for "creating chaos with the ultimate intent to overthrow the government."

The Globe Post noted that Mater had acted as a 'consultant' to Anadolu Kultur.
