= Manuel (film) =

2017 film

- Directed by: Dario Albertini
- Screenplay by: Dario Albertini; Simone Ranucci
- Starring: Andrea Lattanzi
- Cinematography: Giuseppe Maio
- Edited by: Sarah McTeigue
- Music by: Dario Albertini; Michael Brunnock; Sarah McTeigue; Ivo Parlati
- Release date: 2017
- Language: Italian

Manuel is a 2017 Italian drama film co-written and directed by Dario Albertini, in his feature film debut. It premiered at the 74th edition of the Venice Film Festival.

== Cast ==
- Andrea Lattanzi as Manuel Squitti
- Francesca Antonelli as Veronica
- Giulia Elettra Gorietti as Francesca
- Raffaella Rea as Marzia
- Alessandra Scirdi as Nunzia
- Renato Scarpa as Sor Attilio
- Luciano Miele as Avvocato Marone
- Alessandro Di Carlo as Elpidio
- Frankino Murgia as Frankino
- Alessandro Sardelli as Robertino
- Giulio Beranek as Erol

== Release ==
The film had its world premiere at the 74th Venice International Film Festival, in the Il Cinema nel Giardino sidebar. It was released in Italian cinemas on 3 May 2018.

== Reception ==
The film was well-received by critics. Panorama's film critic Claudio Trionfera described it as "a precious little film of Pasolinian echoes". Julien Gester from Libération wrote: "the film navigates the codes of the initiation story with a stroke of sharp realism, churning out false leads and figures, all tenderly sketched". Le Parisien film critic Marine Quinchon referred to it as an "austere, almost monotonous film, yet traversed by beautiful moments".

Fabien Lemercier from Cineuropa offered high praise for Albertini, "sensitive and attentive to the slightest inflections of his protagonist’s sweet melancholic face", whose "well-controlled style gives the film a delicate charm and a rough authenticity, a mixture that is a testament to its undeniable cinematic qualities". Boris Sollazzo from Rolling Stone Italia wrote: "Albertini composes a rough and beautiful symphony, embeds the images in music and noises, the actors in the reality of a real and vivid suburb, the writing within a visual path that fishes from documentary filmmaking, without ever losing the taste for storytelling and choice of field and a vision that is never ideological".

The film won the Best Film Award, the Critics' Prize and the Student Jury Prize at the Montpellier Film Festival, the Jury Award at the Brussels International Film Festival , the FIPRESCI Award at the Gijón International Film Festival, and the award for best actor (Andrea Lattanzi) at the Angers European First Film Festival. For this film, Albertini was nominated for Nastro d'Argento for Best New Director.
