= Drift (2017 film) =

2017 film

- Directed by: Helena Wittmann
- Written by: Helena Wittmann
- Starring: Theresa George
- Release date: 6 September 2017 (Venice)
- Running time: 98 minutes
- Country: Germany
- Language: German

Drift is a 2017 German drama film directed by Helena Wittmann. It was screened in the International Critics' Week section of the 74th Venice International Film Festival.

== Cast ==
- Theresa George
- Josefina Gill
