= Mazen Khaled =

Lebanese filmmaker

- Born: Beirut, Lebanon
- Education: American University of Beirut; Georgetown University; Concordia University; Florida State University
- Occupations: Screenwriter, Director
- Years active: 2010 - present
- Known for: Martyr; A Petty Bourgeois Dream; My Queer Samsara; A Very Dangerous Man
- Website: www.mazenkhaled.com

Mazen Khaled is a US based Lebanese director, Screenwriter, editor and producer. He is mostly known for his 2017 feature film Martyr which was screened at the 74th Venice International Film Festival and was nominated for the Queer Lion award. It was also selected for screening at the 2018 South by Southwest film festival in the Global section. Khaled also won the award for Best Artistic Achievement at the 2018 Alexandria International Film Festival for his work on Martyr. Khaled's 2010 short film My Queer Samsara (2010) premiered at the 2010 The International Film Festival Rotterdam. His other notable works as a director include A Petty Bourgeois Dream (2016), A Very Dangerous Man (2012), which was nominated for a Muhr Award at the Dubai International Film Festival, and Our Gentleman of the Wings (2010).

== Life and career ==
Khaled obtained a bachelor's degree in political studies from American University of Beirut. He then completed his master's degree in public policy from Georgetown University, Washington, D.C. He also attended a film production program at Concordia University and the screenwriting MFA program at Florida State University. He started his career as a policy analyst and project manager and consequently he moved to advertising niche where he wrote and directed numerous ad films for around 12 years. His early works included experimental films with emphasis on "16mm film and contemporary art video". In 2002, he produced and directed his first short film Cadillac Blues.

He is also known as the co-founder of Beirut-based art collector organization EXIST.

== Filmography ==
Year	Film	Writer	Director	Producer	Editor	Format	Film Festival Screening	Nominated for
2002	Cadillac Blues	✓	✓	✓		Short film		
2010	Our Gentleman of the Wings	✓	✓			Short film		
2010	My Queer Samsara	✓	✓	✓	✓	Short film	2010 The International Film Festival Rotterdam	
2012	A Very Dangerous Man	✓	✓			Short film	2012 Dubai International Film Festival	Muhr Awards
2013	Hypnopompic	✓	✓	✓	✓	Dance Video		
2014	Dans les Bras de Noir	✓	✓	✓	✓	Video		
2015	The Still Life Series	✓	✓	✓	✓	Tableau Vivant		
2015	In Search of Stillness	✓	✓	✓	✓	Video		
2016	A Petty Bourgeois Dream	✓	✓	✓		Feature Film		
2017	Martyr	✓	✓			Feature Film	2017 Venice International Film Festival (Premiere)	Queer Lion
