= Jenatsch (film) =

1987 film

- Directed by: Daniel Schmid
- Written by: Daniel Schmid; Martin Suter
- Produced by: Luciano Gloor
- Starring: Vittorio Mezzogiorno
- Cinematography: Renato Berta
- Edited by: Daniela Roderer
- Music by: Pino Donaggio
- Release date: 1987
- Running time: 97 minutes
- Countries: Switzerland; France
- Language: French

Jenatsch is a 1987 French-Swiss drama film directed by Daniel Schmid and written by Schmid and Martin Suter. It follows a journalist investigating the historical figure Jürg Jenatsch. As the investigation continues past and present begin to blur. The film was screened in the Un Certain Regard section at the 1987 Cannes Film Festival and later screened at festivals including La Rochelle, Neuchâtel, Buenos Aires, and Ankara.

== Synopsis ==
Sprecher, a journalist living with his girlfriend Nina, interviews an elderly anthropologist who once supervised the excavation of Jenatsch’s grave. After taking a small brass bell, he discovers that it can take him back in time. As Sprecher’s life becomes increasingly taken over by Jenatsch, his relationship with Nina falls apart and he is drawn into a violent confrontation.

== Cast ==
The cast includes:

- Michel Voïta as Christoph
- Christine Boisson as Nina
- Jean Bouise as Tobler
- Laura Betti as Miss von Planta
- Vittorio Mezzogiorno as Jenatsch
- Carole Bouquet as Lucrezia
- Raul Gimenez as Taxi Driver
- Roland Bertin as Priest
- Teco Celio as Historian

== Production ==
The film was not a direct adaptation of Conrad Ferdinand Meyer’s novel Jürg Jenatsch. Martin Suter instead wrote a new story loosely based on the novel and the historical events.

== Reception ==
Filmdienst described the film as an elegantly staged and photographed dream play, but found that it ultimately drifted into something too non-committal.

== Festival screenings ==
The film was screened in the Un Certain Regard section at the 1987 Cannes Film Festival. Later festival screenings included the 1994 La Rochelle International Film Festival, the 2003 Troia International Film Festival, the 2010 Neuchâtel International Fantastic Film Festival, the 2011 Buenos Aires International Festival of Independent Cinema, and the 2013 Ankara International Film Festival.
