= Sarah Plays a Werewolf =

- Directed by: Katharina Wyss
- Screenplay by: Katharina Wyss; Josa Sesink
- Starring: Loane Balthasar; Michel Voïta
- Cinematography: Armin Dierolf
- Edited by: Tania Stöcklin
- Music by: Conrad Oleak
- Release date: 2017
- Languages: French; German

Sarah Plays a Werewolf (French: Sarah joue un loup garou, German: Sarah spielt einen Werwolf) is a 2017 Swiss-German coming-of-age drama film co-written and directed by Katharina Wyss, in her feature directorial debut. It premiered at the 74th edition of the Venice Film Festival, in the International Critics' Week sidebar. For her performance in the film, Loane Balthasar received a Swiss Film Awards nomination as Best Actress.

== Cast ==
- Loane Balthasar as Sarah
- Michel Voïta as Raphaël
- Manuela Biedermann as Monica
- Annina Walt as Alice
- Sabine Timoteo as Frau Schroeter
- Simon Bonvin as Benjamin
- Arcadi Radeff as Johannes
- Amélie Peterli as Valérie
- Audrey Launaz as Christina
