= Lyna Khoudri =

Algerian-French actress (born 1992)

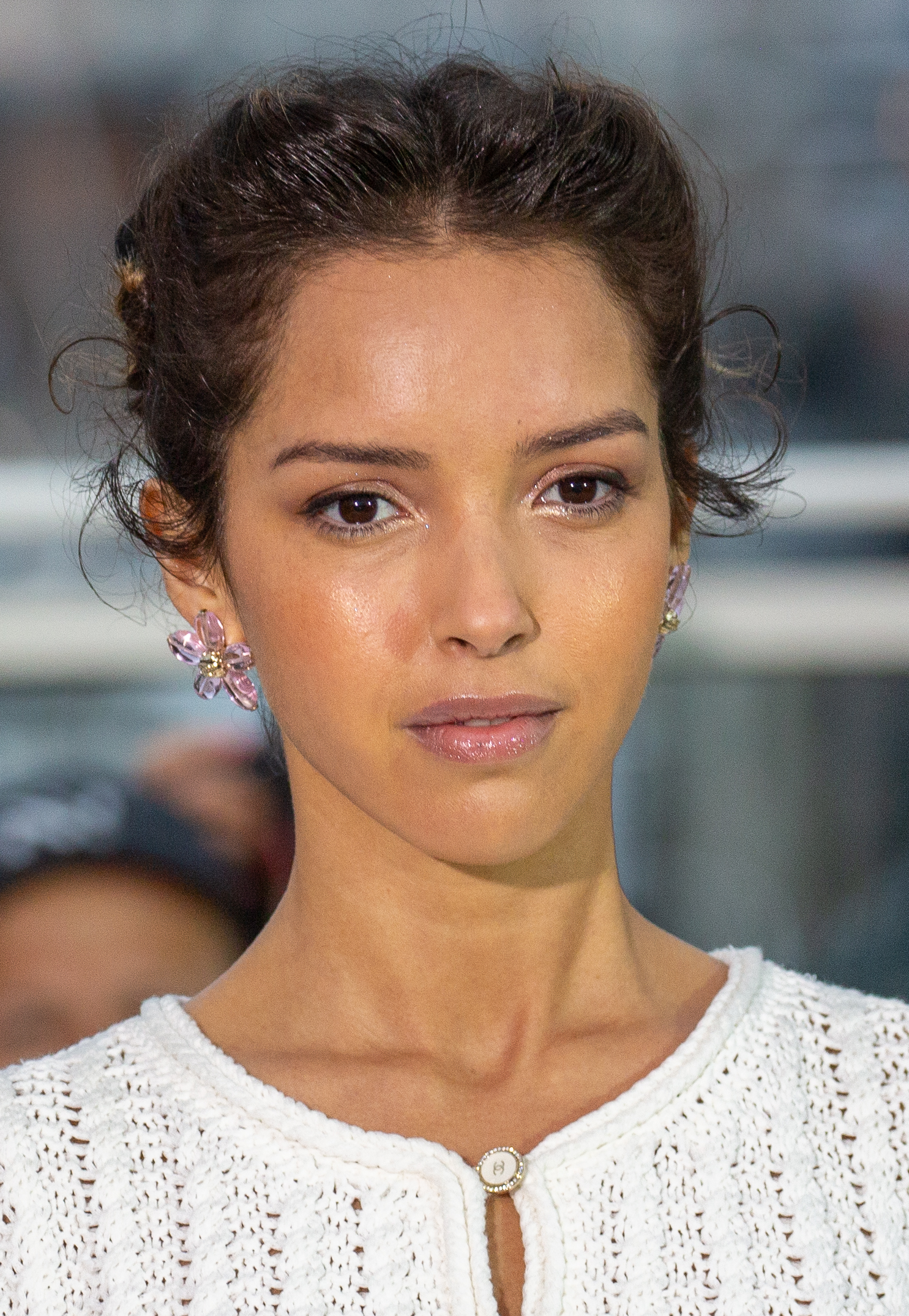
- Khoudri in 2025
- Born: 3 October 1992 (age 34); Algiers, Algeria
- Occupation: Actress
- Years active: 2014–present
- Spouse: Karim Benzema (m. 2025)

Lyna Khoudri (French: [lina kudʁi]; Arabic: لينا خضري; born 3 October 1992) is an Algerian and French actress. In 2017, she won the Orizzonti Award for Best Actress at the 74th Venice International Film Festival for The Blessed. In 2020, she won the César Award for Most Promising Actress for her performance in Papicha. In 2021, she portrayed a student activist in Wes Anderson's The French Dispatch. In 2023, Khoudri portrayed Constance Bonacieux in The Three Musketeers: D'Artagnan and The Three Musketeers: Milady. Khoudri has been a brand ambassador for the French fashion house Chanel since 2022.

== Early life ==
Khoudri was born in 1992 in Algiers, Algeria, to a journalist father and a violinist mother. When Khoudri was 2 years old, the family moved to Aubervilliers, France, as exiles following death threats due to the danger of her father's profession during the Algerian Civil War.

At the age of 18, Khoudri acquired French citizenship.

Khoudri received her professional training at Théâtre national de la Colline in Paris.

Khoudri speaks French, Arabic and English.

== Career ==
In 2014, Khoudri had her first acting role in the French television series Josephine, Guardian Angel.

In 2017, she won the Orizzonti Award for Best Actress at the 74th Venice International Film Festival for her performance in Sofia Djama's film The Blessed.

In 2019, she played Louna in six episodes of the Canal+ miniseries Savages, directed by Rebecca Zlotowski. That year, she also played Nedjma in Mounia Meddour's film Papicha, about a young Algerian woman who uses fashion as cultural resistance during the Algerian Civil War. Khoudri had Marion Cotillard as her Godmother for the César Awards Revelations dinner in January 2020. For her role in Papicha, she won the César Award for Most Promising Actress in February 2020.

In 2021, Khoudri played Juliette, a student activist and the girlfriend of Timothée Chalamet's character in Wes Anderson's The French Dispatch. Their storyline centers on a student riot. Khoudri attended the film's premiere at the 2021 Cannes Film Festival where it competed for the Palme d'Or.

In 2022, Khoudri played Samia in Cédric Jimenez's November, for which she was nominated for the César Award for Best Supporting Actress.

In 2023, Khoudri starred in the monologue Perdre son sac, written and directed by Pascal Rambert at the Théâtre des Bouffes du Nord in Paris. She also portrayed Constance Bonacieux, the love interest of D'Artagnan (portrayed by François Civil) in two French film adaptations of Alexandre Dumas' 1844 novel The Three Musketeers directed by Martin Bourboulon; The Three Musketeers: D'Artagnan and The Three Musketeers: Milady. The same year, she co-starred with Civil again in Romain Cogitore's romantic thriller A Place to Fight For (Une zone à défendre), the first French original film from Disney+, in which she played an environmental activist who falls in love with Civil's character, an undercover police officer.

In 2024, Khoudri starred in Bruno Dumont's sci-fi film The Empire, and in the Italian-Belgian-American drama film How Kids Roll, the directorial debut of Italian-American director Loris Lai, set in the Gaza Strip amidst the Israeli–Palestinian conflict during the Second Intifada in 2003.

=== Upcoming projects ===
In June 2023, it was announced that Khoudri will collaborate again with The Three Musketeers director Martin Bourboulon in a television series for Apple TV+ titled Carême, about the world's first celebrity chef, Marie-Antoine Carême, starring Benjamin Voisin in the title role and Khoudri as Henriette, Carême's lover.

In 2024, Khoudri starred in the short film An Urban Allegory, co-directed by Alice Rohrwacher and JR.

In April 2024, it was announced that Khoudri will voice the female lead in the French-Belgian animated film In Waves, the feature directorial debut of Phuong Mai Nguyen.

In May 2024, Khoudri joined Martin Bourboulon's Afghanistan evacuation drama In The Hell of Kabul: 13 Days, 13 Nights.

In August 2024, Khoudri joined Mélissa Drigeard's Le Gang des Amazones.

In 2025, Khoudri will star in Tarik Saleh's political thriller Eagles of the Republic. opposite Fares Fares.

== Other work ==
Khoudri has been a brand ambassador for the French fashion house Chanel since 2022, after having collaborated with the brand since 2020, following their first collaboration for the 2020 César Awards Revelations. Khoudri made her catwalk debut during Chanel 2022/23 Cruise show in Monte Carlo, Monaco on 5 May 2022.

== Personal life ==
Khoudri began dating French international football player Karim Benzema in 2025, making their relationship public at the Cannes Film Festival. The couple married later that year, in July, in Corsica.

== Filmography ==
=== Feature films ===
Key
†	Denotes films that have not yet been released

Year	Title	Role	Director	Notes
2016	Polina	Elève Karl	Valérie Müller, Angelin Preljocaj	
2016	Rageuses	Khalissa	Kahina Asnoun	Short film
2017	Les Roméos et Juliettes	Lyna	Baya Belal, Elyssa Smiri	Short film
2017	The Blessed (Les Bienheureux)	Feriel	Sofia Djama	
2017	The Party's Over (La Fête est Finie)	Amel	Marie Garel-Weiss	
2017	Luna	Chloé	Elsa Diringer	
2017	Avaler des couleuvres	Souad	Jan Sitta	Short film
2018	Albertine a disparu	Albertine	Véronique Aubouy	Short film
2019	Fatiya	Fatiya	Marion Desseigne-Ravel	Short film
2019	Papicha	Nedjma	Mounia Meddour	
2019	The Specials (Hors normes)	Ludivine	Olivier Nakache, Éric Toledano	
2019	Republique: The Interactive	Lucie	Simon Bouisson	
2019	The Breitner Commando (Qu'un sang impur…)	Assia Bent Aouda	Abdel Raouf Dafri	
2020	The Spark (Brûle)	Maya	Elvire Munoz	Short film
2020	Gagarine	Diana	Fanny Liatard, Jérémy Trouilh	
2021	Haute Couture	Jade	Sylvie Ohayon	
2021	The French Dispatch	Juliette	Wes Anderson	
2021	Secret Name	Nélie Laborde	Aurélia Georges	
2022	Houria	Houria	Mounia Meddour	
2022	November (Novembre)	Samia	Cédric Jimenez	
2023	Babyphone	Charlotte	Ana Girardot	Short film
2023	The Three Musketeers: D'Artagnan	Constance Bonacieux	Martin Bourboulon	
2023	A Place to Fight For (Une zone à défendre)	Myriam	Romain Cogitore	
2023	The Three Musketeers: Milady	Constance Bonacieux	Martin Bourboulon	
2024	The Empire	Line	Bruno Dumont	
2024	How Kids Roll	Farah	Loris Lai	
2024	An Urban Allegory		Alice Rohrwacher and JR	Short film
2025	Eagles of the Republic	Donya	Tarik Saleh	
2025	13 Days, 13 Nights	Eva	Martin Bourboulon	
2025	Unsubmissives	Fatiha Ben Amar (Katy)	Mélissa Drigeard	

=== Television ===
Year	Title	Role	Notes
2014	Josephine, Guardian Angel	Vanessa Grangier	TV series; episode: "Les Boloss"
2015	Re-belle	La Belle	Mini-series
2016	Blood on the Docks	Amandine Sayad	TV series; 1 episode
2019	Savages	Louna	Mini-series, 6 episodes

== Theatre ==
Year	Title	Director	Notes	Ref.
2014	Et le théâtre pour vous c'est quoi ?	Laurent Chétouane	Théâtre de la Commune, Mk2 Bibliothèque	
2016	Hamlet Kebab	Rodrigo García	Théâtre de la Commune, Mk2 Bibliothèque	
2017–2018	Actrice	Pascal Rambert	Théâtre des Bouffes du Nord and tour	
2023	Perdre son sac	Pascal Rambert	Théâtre des Bouffes du Nord	

== Awards and nominations ==
Year	Award / Festival	Category	Work	Result	Ref.
2017	Venice Film Festival	Orizzonti Award for Best Actress	The Blessed	Won	
2018	Festival Jean-Carmet	Audience Award for Best Actress	Avaler des couleuvres	Won	
2019	Angoulême Francophone Film Festival	Valois Award for Best Actress	Papicha	Won	
2020	César Awards	Most Promising Actress	Papicha	Won	
2023	César Awards	Best Supporting Actress	November	Nominated	
