= Papicha =

2019 film

- Film poster
- Directed by: Mounia Meddour
- Written by: Mounia Meddour
- Produced by: Xavier Gens; Gregoire Gensollen; Mounia Meddour
- Starring: Marwan Zeghbib; Lyna Khoudri
- Cinematography: Léo Lefèvre
- Edited by: Damien Keyeux
- Music by: Robin Coudert
- Distributed by: Jour2Fête (France)
- Release dates: 17 May 2019 (Cannes); 9 October 2019 (France)
- Running time: 106 minutes
- Countries: France; Algeria
- Languages: Algerian Arabic; French
- Box office: $2 million

Papicha is a 2019 internationally co-produced drama film directed by Mounia Meddour. It was screened in the Un Certain Regard section at the 2019 Cannes Film Festival. It was selected as the Algerian entry for the Best International Feature Film at the 92nd Academy Awards, but it was not nominated. It became the most successful African film directed by a woman at the French box office.

== Plot ==
Set in the 1990s during the Algerian Civil War, Papicha tells the story of Nedjma, an 18-year-old student who loves fashion and going out with her girlfriends. This lifestyle is challenged by a growing campaign for women to wear the burqa. Her life changes after a dramatic attack and Nedjma decides to create a fashion show as a symbol of resistance.

== Cast ==
- Marwan Zeghbib as Karim
- Lyna Khoudri as Nedjma
- Nadia Kaci as Madame Kamissi
- Ali Damiche as Omer

== Reception ==
On the review aggregator website Rotten Tomatoes, 88% of 32 critics' reviews are positive, with an average rating of 7.1/10. The website's consensus reads: "A view of societal turmoil through the lens of a young woman's experiences, Papicha acts as a compelling calling card for debuting writer-director Mounia Meddour Gens."

== Awards ==
Award	Date of ceremony	Category	Recipient(s)	Result	Ref.
Cannes Film Festival	14–25 May 2019	Un Certain Regard	Mounia Meddour	Nominated	
El Gouna Film Festival	27 September 2019	Golden Star	Papicha	Nominated	
El Gouna Film Festival	27 September 2019	Best Arab Narrative Film	Papicha	Won	
Seminci	26 October 2019	Golden Spike	Papicha	Nominated	
Seminci	26 October 2019	Audience Award	Papicha	Won	
Seminci	26 October 2019	Pilar Miró Prize for Best New Director	Mounia Meddour	Won	
Philadelphia Film Festival	27 October 2019	Archie Award for Best First Feature	Papicha	Nominated	
Carthage Film Festival	2 November 2019	Tanit d'Or	Mounia Meddour	Nominated	
Thessaloniki International Film Festival	10 November 2019	Award by the Greek Chapter of Women in Film & Television	Mounia Meddour	Nominated	
Satellite Awards	19 December 2019	Humanitarian Award	Mounia Meddour	Won	
César Awards	28 February 2020	Best First Feature Film	Papicha	Won	
César Awards	28 February 2020	Most Promising Actress	Lyna Khoudri	Won	

== See also ==
- List of submissions to the 92nd Academy Awards for Best International Feature Film
- List of Algerian submissions for the Academy Award for Best International Feature Film
