= Sunshine North =

- Suburb
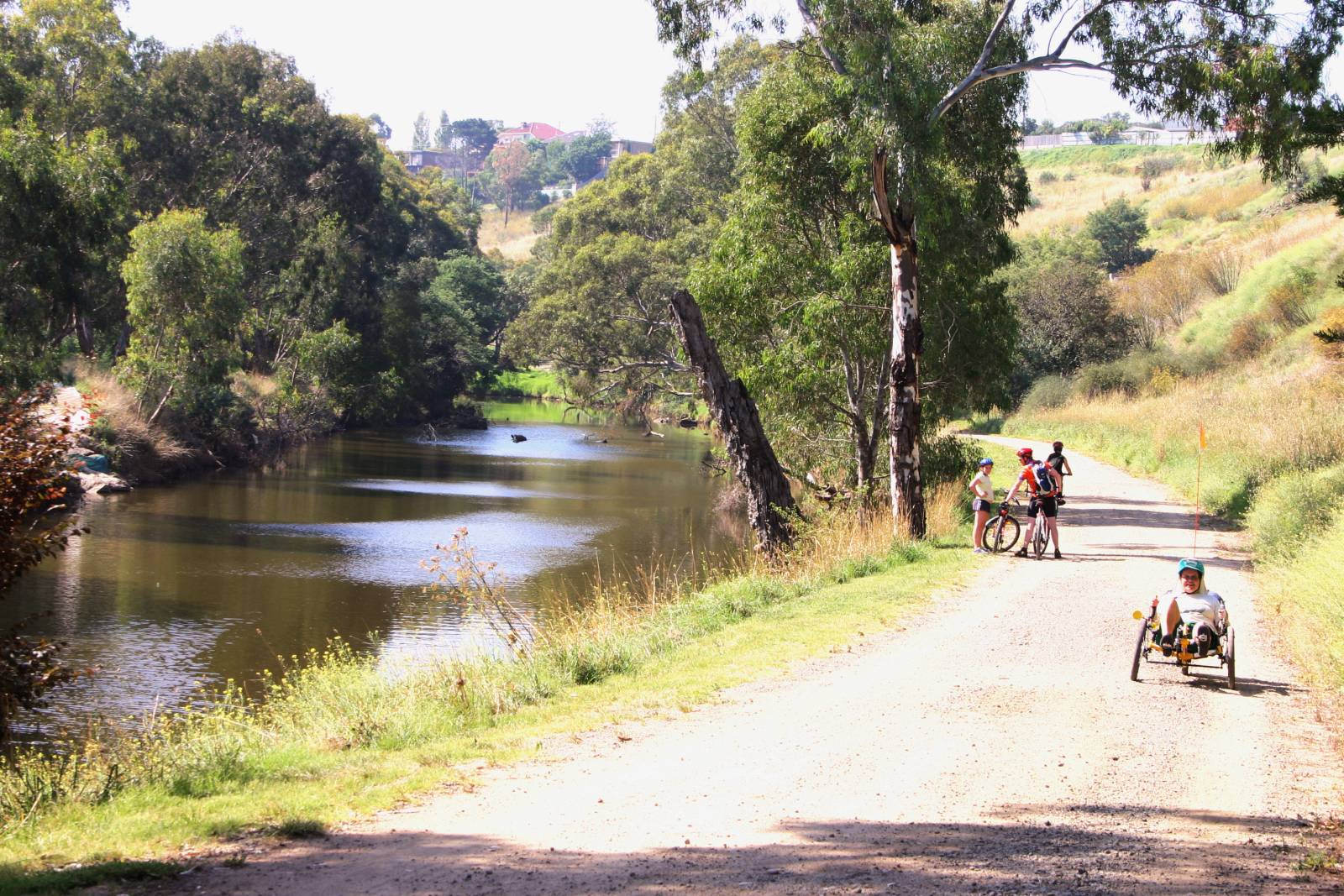

- Interactive map of Sunshine North
- Coordinates: 37.756°S 144.849°E
- Country: Australia
- State: Victoria
- City: Melbourne
- LGA: City of Brimbank
- Location: 13 km (8.1 mi) from Melbourne

Government
  - State electorate: St Albans
  - Federal division: Fraser

Area
  - Total: 7.9 km^{2} (3.1 sq mi)
- Elevation: 51 m (167 ft)

Population
  - Total: 12,047 (2021 census)
  - Density: 1,525/km^{2} (3,950/sq mi)
- Postcode: 3020
Suburbs around Sunshine North
Kealba	Keilor East	Avondale Heights
St Albans	Sunshine North	Braybrook
Albion	Sunshine	Braybrook

Sunshine North is a suburb in Melbourne, Victoria, Australia, 13 km (8.1 mi) west of Melbourne's Central Business District, located within the City of Brimbank local government area. Sunshine North recorded a population of 12,047 at the 2021 census.

== History ==
Sunshine North Post Office opened on 1 February 1958 as the suburb was developed.

=== Heritage listings ===
The following place in Sunshine North is listed on the Victorian Heritage Register:

- Albion Viaduct, also known as the Maribyrnong River Viaduct, across the Maribyrnong River that carries the Albion-Jacana railway line and connects with Keilor East

== Demographics ==
In the 2011 census the population of Sunshine North was 10,637, approximately 50.5% female and 49.5% male.

The median/average age of the people in Sunshine North is 37 years of age. 39.4% of people living in the suburb of Sunshine North were born in Australia. The other top responses for country of birth were 23.1% Vietnam, 5.1% Malta, 2.6% Italy, 2.1% India, 1.7% Philippines, 1.2% China, 1.0% Burma/Myanmar, 0.9% Poland, 0.8% Sudan, 0.8% Croatia, 0.7% New Zealand, 0.6% England, 0.6% Cyprus, 0.5% Greece.

31.8% of people living in Sunshine North speak Vietnamese. The other top languages spoken are 25.8% English only, 6.0% Language spoken at home not stated, 5.8% Maltese, 5.5% Cantonese, 4.7% Other, 3.6% Italian, 1.8% Spanish, 1.6% Arabic, 1.6% Greek.

The religious makeup of Sunshine North is 35.0% Catholic, 23.1% Buddhism, 12.8% No religion, 8.0% Religious affiliation not stated, 4.0% Islam, 3.3% Eastern Orthodox, 3.3% Anglican, 1.8% Baptist, 1.3% Other Religious Groups, 1.1% Christian, nfd.

The median individual income is $353 per week and the median household income is $882 per week.

The median rent in Sunshine North is $255 per week and the median mortgage repayment is $1426 per month.

== Attractions ==
- Brimbank Park (only 4 km walk)
- Maribyrnong River Trail

== Flora and fauna ==
Many native species exist along the Maribyrnong River on the eastern border of the suburb. Some species thrive in the area. The most abundant are;

- Rainbow lorikeet
- Common brushtail possum
- Flying foxes or fruit bat Pteropus
- Cockatoo
- Galah
- Eastern brown snake

Introduced species;

- European rabbit
- Red fox
- Feral cat

== Sport ==
The suburb host former National Soccer League and current Victorian Premier League competitors Melbourne Knights FC at Somers Street. North Sunshine Football Club play at Dempster Park in the Western Region Football League.

== See also ==
- City of Sunshine – Sunshine North was previously within this former local government area.
- Solomon Heights – the area is significant in its lack of development comparative to adjacent suburbs, despite being subdivided into 435 lots during the 1920s
