= Michel Voïta =

Swiss actor (born 1957)

- Born: 1 March 1957 (age 69); Cully, Switzerland
- Occupation: Actor
- Years active: 1983-present

Michel Voïta (born 1 March 1957) is a Swiss actor. He has appeared in more than 60 films since 1983.

== Selected filmography ==
Film
Year	Title	Role	Notes
1987	Jenatsch		
1988	À corps perdu	David	
1988	Lounge Chair		
1988	Natalia		
2004	One Long Winter Without Fire		
2009	Rapt		
2013	Kursverlust		
2017	Sarah Plays a Werewolf	Raphaël	

TV
Year	Title	Role	Notes
2010–2013	R.I.S, police scientifique		
2010	Joséphine, ange gardien	Gandolfi	TV series (1 episode)
2016	Republican Gangsters	Jean-Marc Auzanet	TV series (1 episode)
