= Il colore nascosto delle cose =

2017 film

- Film poster
- Directed by: Silvio Soldini
- Written by: Silvio Soldini
- Starring: Valeria Golino; Adriano Giannini
- Cinematography: Matteo Cocco
- Release dates: 7 September 2017 (Venice); 8 September 2017 (Italy)
- Country: Italy
- Language: Italian

Il colore nascosto delle cose is a 2017 Italian drama film directed by Silvio Soldini. It was screened out of competition at the 74th Venice International Film Festival.

== Cast ==
- Valeria Golino as Emma
- Adriano Giannini as Teo
