= Martyr (2017 film) =

Film directed by Mazen Khaled

- شهيد
- Directed by: Mazen Khaled
- Written by: Samm Haillay; Mazen Khaled
- Produced by: Fadi Nasereddine; Diala Kashmar
- Starring: Carol Abboud; Hadi Bou Ayash; Moustafa Fahs
- Cinematography: Rachelle Noja; Talal Khoury
- Edited by: Vartan Avakian
- Music by: Zeid Hamdan; Vladimir Kurumilian
- Production companies: Biennale College Cinema; Artrip Production
- Release date: 1 September 2017
- Running time: 84 minutes
- Country: Lebanon
- Language: Arabic

Martyr (Arabic: شهيد, romanized: Shaheed) is the second feature film by Lebanese writer and director Mazen Khaled. The film was selected for screening at the 74th Venice International Film Festival in the Biennale College - Cinema section, where it was nominated for the Queer Lion award, and at the 2018 SXSW in the Global section. Martyr was produced by Diala Kachmar of Artrip Production and is distributed in North America by Breaking Glass Pictures and in the UK by Peccadillo Pictures. Martyr was described by Indiewire as "One of the most under-appreciated films of 2018". It features a large ensemble cast led by Carol Abboud, Hamza Mekdad, and Moustafa Fahs.

== Plot ==
The storyline is built around the feelings of Hassane, a young man who cannot afford to live on his own, due to financial problems (he often loses his job). The film shows the difficult situation of this young man, who feels trapped between a strict and troubled family bond and the hopeless environment of Beirut. The scene involving Hassane and his best friend Mahmad performing a dance on a stage, which seems to be from the spiritual perspective, has a strong homoerotic element. The sudden drowning of this man at Beirut's seaside Corniche sparks a mob funeral and causes his friends, who hail from different communities, to grapple with loss and with the struggle to participate in his community's rites and ceremonies. The life and death journey that the young man takes on the last day of his life exposes the schisms of the city and the fault lines dividing its society, and reveals some of the forces pushing the lives of those marginalized young men.

== Themes ==
The film deals with themes of hopelessness, human closeness, death, and spirituality, with an underlying thematic tone of sexuality.

== Production ==
The film was made on a small budget. Shooting took place at Beirut's Corniche, and in Beirut inner city neighborhoods of Ghbeiri and Basta.

== Cast ==
- Carol Abboud
- Hamza Mekdad
- Moustafa Fahs
- Hadi Bou Ayash
- Rashad Nasreddine
- Raneem Mourad

== Music ==
The music for the film was provided by Zeid Hamdan and Vladimir Kurumilian.

== Choreography ==
The dance scenes for the film were choreographed by Ali Chahrour.

== Festivals ==
- Venice International Film Festival, September 2, 2017 (World/National premiere).
- Rome MedFilm Festival, November 2017.
- South by Southwest (SXSW), March 2018.
- Belgrade International Film Festival (FEST18), March 2018.
- British Film Institute -BFI Flare, March 2018.
- The Subversive Film Festival, Croatia, May 2018.
- Sicilia Queer Film Festival, May 2018.
- Arab Film Festival, San Francisco, October 2018.

== Awards and nominations ==
Venice International Film Festival

- Director Mazen Khaled was nominated for the Queer Lion Award.

Alexandria International Film Festival, 2018

- Best Artistic Achievement, Mazen Khaled, winner
- Best Supporting Actress, Carol Abboud, winner

Queer Lisboa - Festival Internacional de Cinema Queer, 2018

- Received Jury Prize in the Best Queer Art Film competition. Jury statement: "A portentous visual and highly choreographed proposal that affirms itself in the time extension of the images, artistic genres and faiths."

The Lebanese Movie Awards

- Best Lebanese Motion Picture, Nominee
- Best Writing in Lebanese Motion Picture, Mazen Khaled, Nominee
- Best Editing In A Lebanese Motion Picture, Vartan Avakian, Nominee

== Reviews ==
The film has received generally positive reviews in The Guardian, The New York Times, the Los Angeles Times, and Scenes Journal, as well as in many publications in Arabic and French.

The Guardian gave it 4/5 stars and called it a "Masterful, visceral, study of grief." Indiewire named it as one of the "Most Under Appreciated Movies of 2018."

== See also ==
- 23rd March 1931: Shaheed – 2002 Indian film directed by Guddu Dhanoa
- Ghazi Shaheed
