= Mounia Meddour =

Franco-Algerian film director (born 1978)

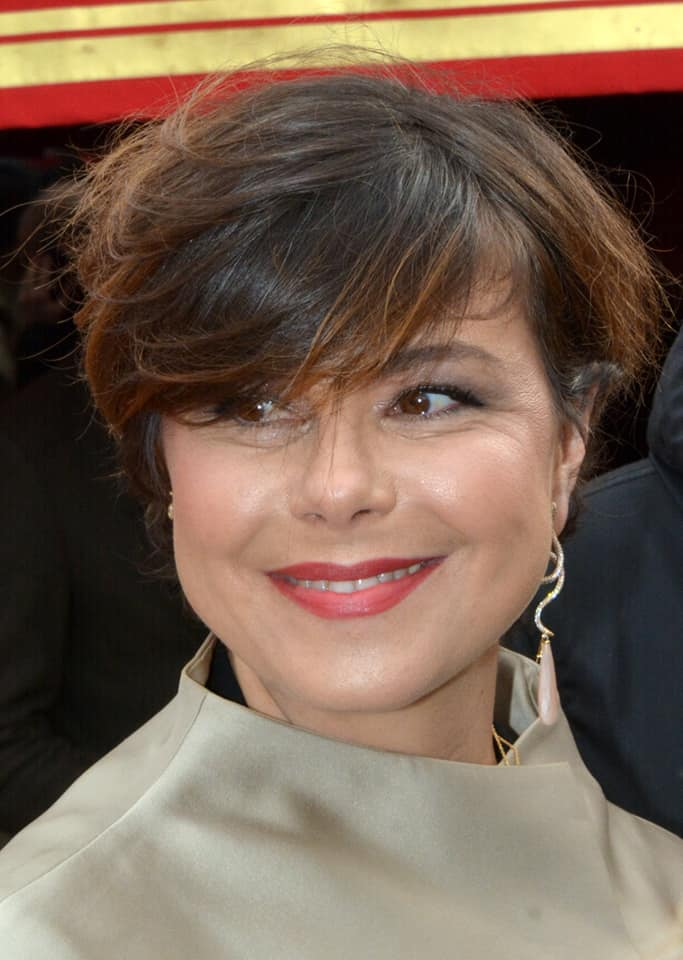
- Born: 15 May 1978 (age 47); Moscow
- Citizenship: Algeria, France
- Occupations: Film director, Film screenwriter, Film producer, Screenwriter

Mounia Meddour (born 15 May 1978) is a Franco-Algerian film director.

== Biography ==
Meddour's father is the Algerian director Azzedine Meddour and her mother comes from Russia. She studied in a journalism school, then trained in cinema and audiovisual in France. She completed a diploma at the European Centre Of Training Production Film (CEFPF) in fiction film directing in 2002 then a second diploma in documentary filmmaking in 2004.

She then directed several documentaries, such as Particules élémentaires in 2007, La Cuisine en héritage in 2009, and in 2011 Cinéma algérien, un nouveau souffle a documentary on the new generation of Algerian directors which emerge, despite the absence of funding. That same year, she directed her first short fiction film, Edwige.

Finally, in 2019, her first feature fiction film, Papicha, filmed in spring 2018, is directed and is selected at the Cannes Film Festival. In Papicha, the young female main character, Nedjma, is passionate about fashion and tries to organize a fashion show in her hall of residence in 1990. It is a way to mention a decade of violence and terrorism, in the 1990s, in Algeria. The film was presented at the Cannes Film Festival in the Un Certain Regard section and also received three awards at the Angoulême Francophone Film Festival in France. It was also nominated at the César Awards 2020 as Best First Feature Film, and her actress Lyna Khoudri, with whom she prepared for a long time her character, was selected in the list of a potential Most Promising Actress award. Finally, on 28 February 2020 at the César Film Awards, the film won two awards: Best First Feature Film and Most Promising Actress for her lead actress awards.

== Filmography ==
Unless otherwise stated, Mounia Meddor is director and screen-writer of her movies.

- 2006: Tikjda, La caravane des savoirs (documentary)
- 2007: Hitman, directed by Xavier Gens (assistant director)
- 2007: Particules élémentaires (documentary, 50 min)
- 2009: La Cuisine en héritage (documentary, 52 min)
- 2011: Cinéma algérien, un nouveau souffle (documentary, 52 min)
- 2012: Edwige (short film, 15 min)
- 2018: Papicha, selected film in the Un Certain Regard at the 2019 Cannes Film Festival, selected at the 92nd Academy Awards to represents Algeria in the Best International Feature Film category, multi-ward winning (2019 César Award for Best First Feature Film, 2019 César Award for Most Promising Actress, Young Jury Prize at the International Festival of Carthage, etc.)
- 2022: Houria

== Awards ==
- 2019: Angoulême Francophone Film Festival
- 2020 César: First Feature Film for Papicha
- 2023 Biografilm Festival: Beyond Fiction Audience Award for Houria
