= Ex Libris: The New York Public Library =

2017 film

- Film poster
- Directed by: Frederick Wiseman
- Written by: Frederick Wiseman
- Release dates: September 4, 2017 (Venice); September 13, 2017 (US)
- Running time: 197 minutes
- Country: United States
- Language: English

Ex Libris: The New York Public Library is a 2017 American documentary film about the New York Public Library (NYPL), directed by Frederick Wiseman. It was screened in the main competition section of the 74th Venice International Film Festival where it won the FIPRESCI Award.

== Synopsis ==
The documentary explores the role of the NYPL as an egalitarian network of exploration, exchange and learning. There are no central characters, just a series of vignettes depicting everything from poetry to robot building. The library has 92 locations and serves each area differently according to its needs.

It includes well-known speakers such as Richard Dawkins, Patti Smith and Elvis Costello and anonymous library users throughout its foyers, annexes and meeting rooms.

The administrators who lead the library explore their challenges in serving such a diverse set of needs and Wiseman contrasts this with the diverse patrons of the library, including laptop users, researchers and the homeless.

== Reception ==
Ex Libris received unanimous critical acclaim from critics. Metacritic gave the film a weighted average score of 91 out of 100 based on 22 critics, indicating "universal acclaim". Film critic Manohla Dargis of the New York Times said, that Ex Libris is "one of the greatest movies of Mr. Wiseman’s extraordinary career". Ksenia Rozhdestvenskaya from Kommersant noted that Wiseman made a film "about ways of knowing the world", it's "a film about benevolent curiosity that resists aggressive ignorance".
