= The Taste of Rice Flower =

- 米花之味
- Directed by: Pengfei
- Screenplay by: Pengfei; Ze Ying
- Cinematography: Pen-Jung Liao
- Music by: Ainan Cha; Keiichi Suzuki
- Release date: 2017
- Language: Chinese

The Taste of Rice Flower (Chinese: 米花之味; pinyin: Mi Hua Zhi Wei), also known as Left Behind Buddha, is a 2017 Chinese drama film co-written and directed by Pengfei.

The film premiered at the Venice Days section of the 74th edition of the Venice Film Festival.

== Plot ==
Single mother Ye Nan returned to her hometown from the city to start a new life. Working away from home for many years had caused some differences in her lifestyle and way of thinking compared to her family. They needed to reintegrate into each other's lives in a new way, but the process of reconnecting with her daughter was not smooth. One day, her daughter and her friends were arrested for stealing money and flowers from the most sacred temple in the village. The villagers believed that the children were "possessed by demons." To "save" them, the villagers decided to worship a stone Buddha hidden in a 120-million-year-old cave during the Water Splashing Festival.

== Cast ==
- Ze Ying as Ye Nan
- Bule Ye as Nan Hang
- Men Ye as Nan Xianglu
- Pin Ye as Ye Pin
