= Sofia Djama =

Algerian film director

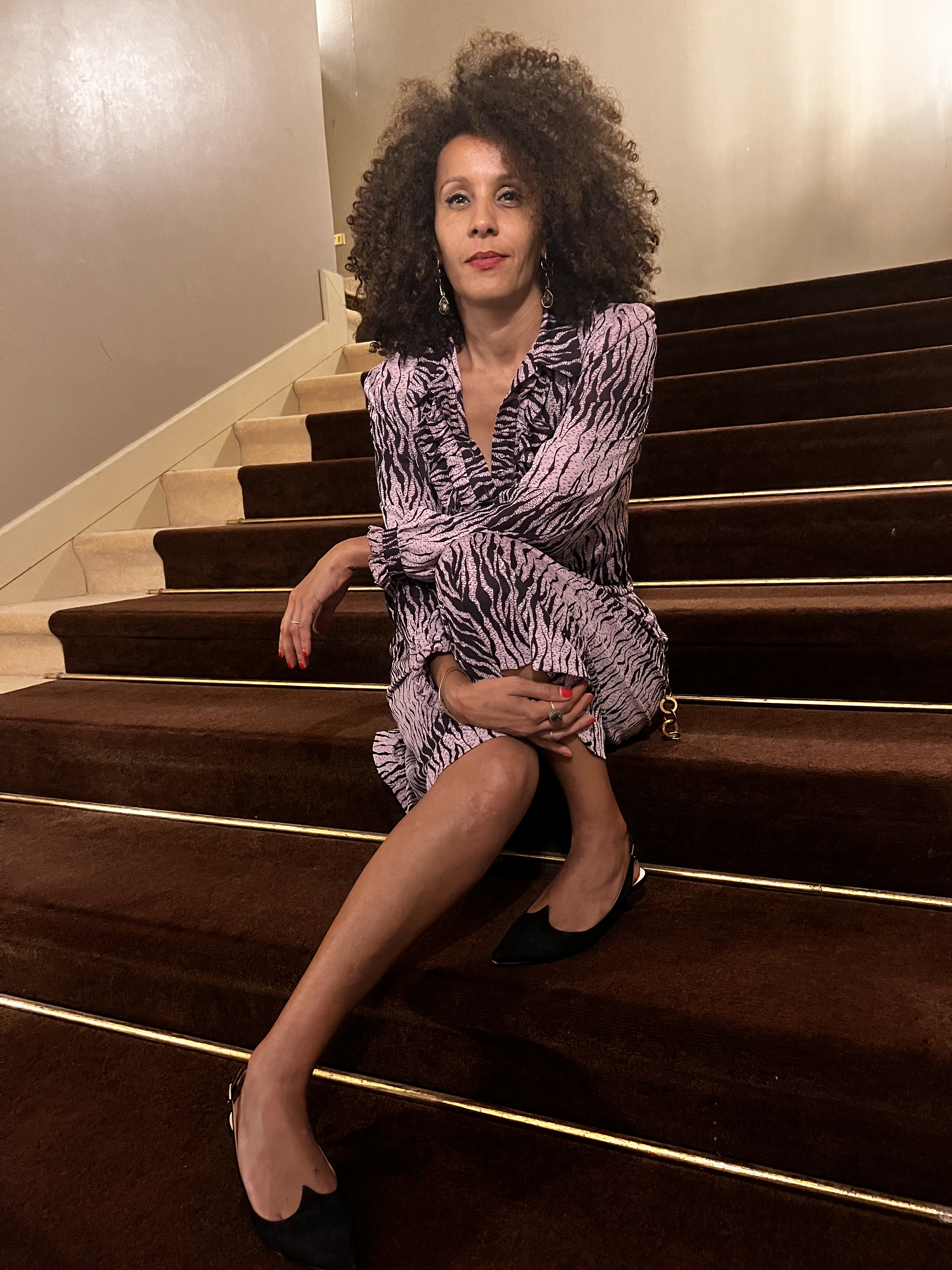
- Born: 1979 (age 46–47)
- Occupation: Film director

Sofia Djama is an Algerian film director. Her 2017 feature film debut, The Blessed, won three awards at the Venice Film Festival, including the Brian Award, given to the film which "best champions human rights, democracy, pluralism and freedom of thought", and the Lina Mangiacapre Award for a film which "changes the image of women in the cinema".

Djama's second short film, Softly One Saturday Morning (Mollement, un samedi matin), won two prizes at the Clermont-Ferrand International Short Film Festival in 2012.

Her 2017 feature film debut is The Blessed (Les bienheureux), a coming-of-age story set in Algiers in 2008, starring Sami Bouajila and Nadia Kaci. The Blessed had its world premiere at the Venice Film Festival, and was one of only two films there from African directors, the other being the Franco-Tunisian Abdellatif Kechiche, with his film, Mektoub, My Love: Canto Uno.

The Blessed won three awards in the Orizzonti section (Horizons) section of the Venice Film Festival, with the Best Actress award going to Lyna Khoudri, the Brian Award, given to the film which "best champions human rights, democracy, pluralism and freedom of thought", and the Lina Mangiacapre Award for a film which "changes the image of women in the cinema". International sales and French distribution rights have been acquired by BAC Films.

== Early life ==
Sofia Djama was born in 1979 in Oran, Algeria but grew up in Béjaïa, (formerly known as Bougie). In 1999, she moved to Algiers to carry out her studies in Foreign Language and Literature. She later decided to remain in Algiers after finishing her studies.

She then worked in advertising and at the same time wrote short stories, which she would use a few years later to create her short film: Softly One Saturday Morning, the story of a rapist without an erection.

== Career ==
Softly One Saturday Morning was released in 2012 and it was met with positive reception. It won two awards at the Clermont-Ferrand International Short Film Festival, the ACSE and the Best First Fictional Film. This film was also presented at the Malmö Arab Film Festival in Sweden, the Journées Cinématographiques in Algier and at other various short film festivals around the world.

In 2017, Djama released a full-length feature film, The Blessed. This film follows the lives of characters living in Algiers post-civil war. The film also shows a dilemma faced by many Algerians during this post-war period: whether to piece back together life in Algeria or to relocate to France in hopes to start fresh. Djama received two awards for this film at the Venice Film Festival. The first one, the Brian Award, is given to a film that defends the values of human rights, democracy, diversity and freedom of thought, without distinction for gender or sexual orientation. Djama was also awarded the Lina Mangiacapre Award, which is given to a film which changes the representation and image of women in cinema.

In January 2018, Djama, with her film The Blessed, participated in the 19th Black Movie Festival in Geneva, Switzerland, where she received the Public Award.

== Personal life ==
In 2015, Djama supported a young woman who was denied access to University for a skirt that was deemed too short. She created a specific Facebook page : #My dignity is not decided by the length of my skirt. (#Ma Dignité n'est pas dans la longueur de ma jupe.)

Djama identifies as an activist, and joined protests when she was fourteen years old.

Regarding her relationship with Islam, Djama states “I’m agnostic, but I say that I am from the Arab-Muslim culture because I was steeped in that. I don’t reject my culture and my Arab-Muslim heritage”.

== Awards ==
=== Awards and nominations ===
Year	Award	Film	Category	Result
2012	Clermont-Ferrand International Film Festival	Softly, One Saturday Morning	Best First Film	Won
2012	Clermont-Ferrand International Film Festival	Softly, One Saturday Morning	ACSE	Won
2013	Dresden Film Festival	Softly, One Saturday Morning	Best Short Fiction Film	Nominated
2017	Venice Film Festival	The Blessed	Brian Award	Won
2017	Venice Film Festival	The Blessed	Lina Mangiacapre Award	Won
2017	Venice Film Festival	The Blessed	Orrizzonti Award	Nominated
2018	Göteborg International Film Festival	The Blessed	International Debut Award	Nominated
2018	Hamburg Film Festival	The Blessed	Political Film Award	Nominated
2018	Lumiere Awards, France	The Blessed	Best First Film	Nominated
2018	Minneapolis St. Paul International Film Festival	The Blessed	Emerging Filmmaker Award	Nominated
2018	Seattle International Film Festival	The Blessed	New Directors Competition	Nominated

== Filmography ==
=== As a director ===
- 2012 : Les 100 pas de Monsieur X, fiction short film. Broadcast on France 3
- 2012 : Softly One Saturday Morning (Mollement, un samedi matin), fiction short film. Broadcast on Arte, Ciné+, and TV5 Monde
- 2017 : The Blessed (Les bienheureux), fiction feature film
