= The Blessed (2017 film) =

- Directed by: Sofia Djama
- Screenplay by: Sofia Djama
- Produced by: Serge Zeitoun; Patrick Quinet
- Starring: Sami Bouajila; Lyna Khoudri; Faouzi Bensaïdi; Nadia Kaci; Adam Bessa; Amine Lansari
- Cinematography: Pierre Aïm
- Edited by: Sophie Brunet
- Production companies: Liaison Cinematograhique; Artemis Productions; Shelter Prod
- Release date: December 13, 2017
- Running time: 1h 42min
- Countries: Algeria; Belgium; France
- Languages: French, Arabic

The Blessed, also known as Les Bienheureux, is an Algerian movie that shows a family living in the aftermath of the Algerian Civil War also known as 'the dirty war'.

== Synopsis ==
Set in 24 hours, the movie centers on a couple who happens to be celebrating their twentieth anniversary and plans a date in a restaurant. The couple gets into a disagreement concerning whether or not to send their son abroad for schooling and they decide to ask their friends about it during the night out. During the dinner, the topic is brought up and it ends up with each of them opining their perspectives concerning the war and country's future.

== Cast ==
- Sami Bouajila
- Nadia Kaci
- Adam Bessa
- Amine Lansari
- Lyna Khoudri
- Faouzi Bensaïdi
- Hadjar Benmansour
- Salima Abada
- Abdelkader Affak
- Mohamed Ali Allalou

== Awards and nominations ==
*Göteborg Film Festival (2018)

International Debut Award [Nominee]

Sofia Djama

*AMAA 2018 Award

Best Young/Promising Actor

Anine Lansari [winner]

*Hamburg Film Festival (2018)

Political Film Award [Nominee]

Sofia Djama

*Lumière Awards, France (2018)

Heike Hurst Award [Nominee]

Best First Film (Meilleur premier film)

Sofia Djama

*Minneapolis St. Paul International Film Festival (2018)

Emerging Filmmaker Award [Winner]

Sofia Djama

*Seattle International Film Festival (2018)

New Directors Competition [Nominee]

Sofia Djama

*Venice Film Festival (2017)

Brian Award [Winner]

Sofia Djama

Lina Mangiacapre Award [Winner]

Sofia Djama

Venice Horizons Award [Winner]

Best Actress

Lyna Khoudri

Venice Horizons Award [Nominee]

Best Film

Sofia Djama
