= Human Flow =

2017 film

- Film poster
- Directed by: Ai Weiwei
- Written by: Chin-chin Yap; Tim Finch; Boris Cheshirkov
- Produced by: Ai Weiwei; Chin-chin Yap; Heino Deckert; Andy Cohen
- Cinematography: List: Murat Bay; Christopher Doyle; Lv Hengzhong; Wenhai Huang; Konstantinos Koukoulis; Renaat Lambeets; Dongxu Li; Johannes Waltermann; Ai Weiwei; Ma Yan; Zanbo Zhang; Xie Zhenwei
- Edited by: Niels Pagh Andersen
- Music by: Karsten Fundal
- Production companies: AC Films; Participant Media
- Distributed by: NFP Marketing & Distribution (Germany); Lionsgate (International)
- Release date: 1 September 2017 (Venice)
- Running time: 140 minutes
- Country: Germany
- Languages: List: English; Arabic; Persian; French; German; Greek; Hungarian; Kurdish; Rohingya; Spanish; Turkish

Human Flow is a 2017 German documentary film co-produced and directed by Ai Weiwei about the current global refugee crisis. In the film the viewer is taken to over 20 countries to understand both the scale and the personal impact of this massive human migration. It was shot using various technologies, including drones, cameras and iPhones. Human Flow was screened in the main competition section of the 74th Venice International Film Festival.

== Background ==
Ai tells how the film began after he got his passport back from Chinese authorities and went on vacation to the Greek island of Lesbos. There he saw refugees coming on shore and began shooting footage on his iPhone. The shocking experience inspired him to make a film about refugees and their harrowing journeys.

In the Director's statement of the screening program for Venice Biennale Ai says, "Human Flow is a personal journey, an attempt to understand the conditions of humanity in our days. The film is made with deep belief in the value of human rights. In this time of uncertainty, we need more tolerance, compassion and trust for each other since we all are one. Otherwise, humanity will face an even bigger crisis."

He notes that his film is extremely personal to him, relating to his past experiences of inhumane treatment after being forced out of his home in Beijing during China's Cultural Revolution. He goes on to say that his experiences help him understand why he identifies with the refugees in the film and with the external forces they are often powerlessly facing. Ai also explains the significance of his title, Human Flow, and how it relates to flooding. With an analogy he makes the point of either building a dam to stop the flood, which would not solve the issue entirely and could intensify the outcomes, or finding a path to let the flow continue. Relating dams to physical borders and walls, he encourages the understanding of the causes behind why people become refugees and how we should work to solve those conditions so to stem the flow at its source.

== Key themes ==
Human Flow brings to light the obvious gravity of the current global refugee crisis and uses interviews from experts and refugees alike. The film shows various refugees in times of crisis and how refugee flows can be classified into four causation categories: wars between states, ethnic conflicts, non-ethnic conflicts and flights from repression. Reflecting on the sheer volume of refugees currently living in our world today, the film deeply considers both individuals who are forced to migrate and those who are internally displaced i.e. forced to flee from their homes but remain within the territory of their own country.

The film also reflects upon and questions the current global response to the refugee crisis. Shedding light onto 'shared responsibility', Human Flow shows how nations close to areas with many refugees require help for accommodation and how many wealthier nations are hesitant to provide the needed aid. It conveys global responses to border closings and the effects on refugees, such as the closure of the Republic of Macedonia border and the refugees becoming stuck in Greece's Idomeni border camp.

Drawing on issues within refugee camps across the world, the film shows the vast numbers of individuals residing in camps such as the now defunct Calais Jungle outside Calais in France and Dadaab in north-eastern Kenya, with many having minimal basic human rights and resources.

While telling the story Ai constantly focuses on the relation between refugees and individual human rights. He has multiple individuals seen crying on camera, sharing their grief and experiences from their dangerous voyages, their fears and the deaths of their loved ones. The film looks at various conventions set to protect refugees all the while, actual aid, policies and strategies do not correspond to obligations such as the 1951 Convention Relating to the Status of Refugees.

== Purpose ==
The film is a direct call to action showing the gravity and scale of the refugee crisis. The EU requires responses to improve and enforce its charter on refugees and Ai's efforts to expand this message has intensified with the creation of screening parties. For instance in Canada, TIFF (Toronto International Film Festival) held a screening and panel discussion with representatives from Médecins Sans Frontières (Doctors Without Borders), bringing attention to the crisis by showing the film to academics and to the general public. The film also touches upon the response by the United Nations, whose official refugee definition is given in the film as someone being forced out of their homeland mainly due to violent conflict and persecution. This definition is often challenged because when it was created in 1951 the Geneva Convention was not specifically meant for global mass migration. The film raises the fact that refugees are increasing more now than ever before since the second World War.

Ai's outspoken activism and artistic purpose constantly challenge issues regarding freedom and human rights. His social commentaries on the refugee crisis relate to his personal life and how he was forced out of Beijing with his family as a young child during China's Cultural Revolution. He is open about his dehumanizing experience of living in a Chinese camp with terrible conditions. His art has often been at the forefront of bringing awareness to the refugee crisis; he was quoted explaining that Human Flow attempts to show the viewer the similarities between individuals: "Understanding of humanity is above all. It's about, We're all the same. If someone being hurt, we are being hurt. So that kind of ideology has to be shared only by doing that have we had compassion for other people. We lost our home too. So that kind of ideology has to be shared only by doing so that have we have compassion for other people. We can tolerate something we'd normally think is so so foreign and so different. Someone lost their education, you feel, Oh, that could be my son. Some women have no place to deliver their children, you will say, That could be my mom or my wife. So those things we have to sounds very simple but we have to repeatedly talk about that. That makes us better as a society." Ai's efforts go on to explain that this crisis would be sooner solved if we all realize that it is "about all of us".

== Cast ==
Throughout the film the viewer comes in contact with a multitude of refugees and their individual experiences. Various dignitaries are also included, such as Princess Dana Firas of Jordan who empathetically speaks about the current refugee crisis and conveys Jordan's response as “You must always hold on to humanity and the more immune you are to people’s suffering, I think, that’s very very dangerous.” Ai also interviews Maha Yahya, from the Carnegie Middle East Center, who goes on to speak about radicalization effects on vulnerable youth. The use of other experts in the film is extensive and also includes members of the United Nations, such as the UNHCR Communications Officer Boris Cheshirkov, the Italian UNHCR diplomat Filippo Grandi and the Deputy representative of UNHCR Kenya Wella Koyou as well as the Senior Operation Coordinator of UNHCR Pakistan Martin Din Kajdomcajc and Maya Ameratunga from UNHCR Afghanistan. Additionally, Ai introduces Dr. Cem Terzi from Turkey who works for the Association of Bridging Peoples as well as Druze leader, Walid Joumblatt and Greece's Migration minister Ioannis Mouzalas. Including various news sources juxtaposed with shots of the current crisis, the different chapters are intertwined throughout the film with Ai's artistic content quoting various poets from all around the world to make sense of the different situations.

== Reception ==
=== Critical reception ===
Human Flow received generally favorable reviews from critics. On review aggregator Rotten Tomatoes, the film received an approval rating of 91%, based on 104 reviews, with an average score of 7.7/10. The website's critical consensus reads, "Epic in scope yet clear-eyed and intimate, Human Flow offers a singularly expansive – and sobering – perspective on the global refugee crisis." On another review aggregator, Metacritic, the film received a score of 77 out of 100, based on 22 critics, indicating "generally favorable reviews".

In Sight & Sound, Ben Nicholson noted the film's loose structure and its use of aerial drone shots to display entire cityscapes of destruction and vast oceans to be crossed.

The New York Times called it a "strangely beautiful movie" and credited the film for focusing on individuality amidst the large masses of people through the use of drones.

GQ stated that the film conveyed a radical type of empathy to the viewer by focussing on human aspects, such as with the man walking to a makeshift graveyard where the bodies of his loved ones were buried – he started fleeing with 17 people and was left with 12 – while the viewer is caught in a visceral moment of his grief. GQ noted the film's ability to have the camera constantly lingering in times of sadness to create a forceful humanization.

The Washington Post called Human Flow "pungent conceptually and aesthetically" and noted that leaving the audience uncertain as to which camp they were led to underlined Ai's point that it did not matter. Overall, the critic gave the film a rating of 3/4 stars.

The film received such high praise that it was selected for a group of 170 documentaries shortlisted for the Oscars and placed within the top 15.
