= Araby (2017 film) =

2017 film by João Dumans and Affonso Uchoa

- Portuguese: Arábia
- Directed by: João Dumans; Affonso Uchoa
- Produced by: Vitor Graize
- Starring: Murilo Caliari; Aristides de Sousa; Renata Cabral; Renan Rovida
- Release date: February 1, 2017 (International Film Festival Rotterdam)
- Country: Brazil
- Language: Portuguese

Araby (Portuguese:Arábia) is a 2017 Brazilian drama film, directed by João Dumans and Affonso Uchoa. The film was produced by Vitor Graize through Katásia Filmes, and Vasto Mundo. The film stars Murilo Caliari in the lead role alongside Aristides de Sousa, Renata Cabral, and Renan Rovida. The film premiered in 2017 at the International Film Festival Rotterdam.

== Plot ==
Sent on an errand by his aunt, Andre (Murilo Caliari) finds a notebook of a factory worker, Cristiano (Aristides de Sousa), who has been seriously injured. The notebook reveals a handwritten memoir of Cristiano's travels over the last decade. Through this memoir, Cristiano reveals his life as a drifter, and the various people, places, and experiences he encounters along the way.

== Cast ==
- Murilo Caliari as Andre
- Aristides de Sousa as Cristiano
- Renata Cabral as Ana
- Renan Rovida as Renan

== Reception ==
=== Critical response ===
On the review aggregator Rotten Tomatoes, the film holds an approval rating of 93% based on 27 reviews, and an average rating of 7.58. The website's critical consensus reads, "Araby peers unflinchingly into the gloom of its characters' lives to tell an undeniably grim story that builds to a poignantly affecting conclusion." Metacritic, which uses a weighted average, assigned the film a score of 82 out of 100, based on 8 critics, indicating "Universal acclaim".

Robert Abele of Los Angeles Times wrote "It’s become a hallmark of the documentary/fiction hybrid that the realism on display feels both lived-in and poetic, and that’s in De Sousa’s face as well, which — like the obliquely titled “Araby” as it shuffles along to its unexpected, reflective conclusion — always registers a powerful synthesis of sensitivity and weariness."Glenn Kenny of The New York Times wrote, " ...thanks to Mr. de Sousa’s superb performance, the movie often convincingly portrays not just the exploited condition of laborers such as Cristiano, but the nagging sadness of life itself."
