= The Night I Swam =

2017 drama film by

- International poster

Japanese name
- Kanji: 泳ぎすぎた夜
Transcriptions
- Revised Hepburn: Oyogi sugita yoru
- Directed by: Damien Manivel; Kohei Igarashi
- Produced by: Martin Bertier; Damien Manivel
- Starring: Takara Kogawa; Keiki Kogawa; Takashi Kogawa; Chisato Kogawa
- Cinematography: Wataru Takahashi
- Edited by: William Laboury
- Music by: Jérôme Petit
- Production companies: MLD Films; Shellac; Nobo (JP)
- Distributed by: Shellac Distribution; Tycoon Distribuzione
- Release dates: 5 September 2017 (Venice); 24 February 2018 (Japan)
- Running time: 79 minutes
- Countries: France; Japan
- Box office: US$20,440

The Night I Swam (Note: Japanese: 泳ぎすぎた夜, romanized: Oyogi sugita yoru; French: Takara, la nuit où j'ai nagé) is a 2017 drama film directed by Kohei Igarashi and Damien Manivel. The film was featured at a number of International Film Festivals during its release, including the Febiofest film festival in Prague 2018, the Sofia Film Festival and the BUFF film Festival

== Plot ==
A 6-year-old boy is awoken one night by his fisherman father heading to work. Finding it impossible to fall back to sleep, he draws a picture which he then slips into his satchel. On his way to school next morning, still drowsy, he wanders off the path and ends up lost in the snow. The boy gets on a train, ending up in a big city, and endeavours to find his way home.

== Cast ==
- Takara Kogawa as Little Boy
- Keiki Kogawa as sister
- Takashi Kogawa as Father
- Chisato Kogawa as Mother

== Production ==
The film was shot in location in Aomori, Japan, as a French-Japanese co-production. The film had no actual dialogue, with only the sounds of the actions of the main character.

== Festivals and awards ==
The film featured at a number of festivals including:

- 74th Venice International Film Festival in 2017.
- Febiofest Film Festival in Prague, 2018.
- Sofia International Film Festival
- BUFF International Film Festival
- San Sebastián International Film Festival
- São Paulo International Film Festival 2017
- Buenos Aires International Festival of Independent Cinema 2018.
- 27th Busan International Film Festival in 2022

The film was nominated for a number of awards, winning one:

- Ghent International Film Festival 2017 - Nominated Best Film
- IBAFF International Film Festival 2018 - Nominated Best Feature Film
- San Sebastián International Film Festival 2017 - nominated Zabaltegi prize.
- Tokyo Filmex 2017 - Winner Student prize, nominated Grand Prize.
- Venice Film Festival 2017 - Nominated Venice Horizons award

== Awards and nominations ==
Year	Award	Category	Recipient(s)	Result	Ref.
2017	Venice Film Festival	Orizzonti awards	The Night I Swam	Nominated	
2017	Tokyo Filmex	Student Jury Prize	The Night I Swam	Won	
2018	International Film Festival for Children and Youth	Golden Butterfly for Best Feature Film Screenplay	Damien Manivel and Kohei Igarashi	Won	
