= Hunting Season (2017 film) =

2017 film

- Directed by: Natalia Garagiola
- Written by: Natalia Garagiola
- Starring: Germán Palacios
- Release dates: 2 September 2017 (Venice); 14 September 2017 (Argentina)
- Running time: 105 minutes
- Country: Argentina
- Language: Spanish

Hunting Season (Spanish: Temporada de Caza) is a 2017 Argentine drama film directed by Natalia Garagiola. It was screened in the International Critics' Week section of the 74th Venice International Film Festival where it won the SIAE Audience Award.

== Plot ==
A teenager with aggressive and violent behavior is forced, after the death of his mother, to spend a few months with his biological father in the forests of Patagonia. His father, whom he has not seen 10 years ago, is a hunter and has another family. In San Martín de los Andes, the place where his father resides, he must confront his own capacity to love and to kill.

== Cast ==
- Germán Palacios as Ernesto
- Lautaro Bettoni as Nahuel
- Boy Olmi as Bautista
- Rita Pauls as Clara
- Pilar Benitez Vivart as Luisina
