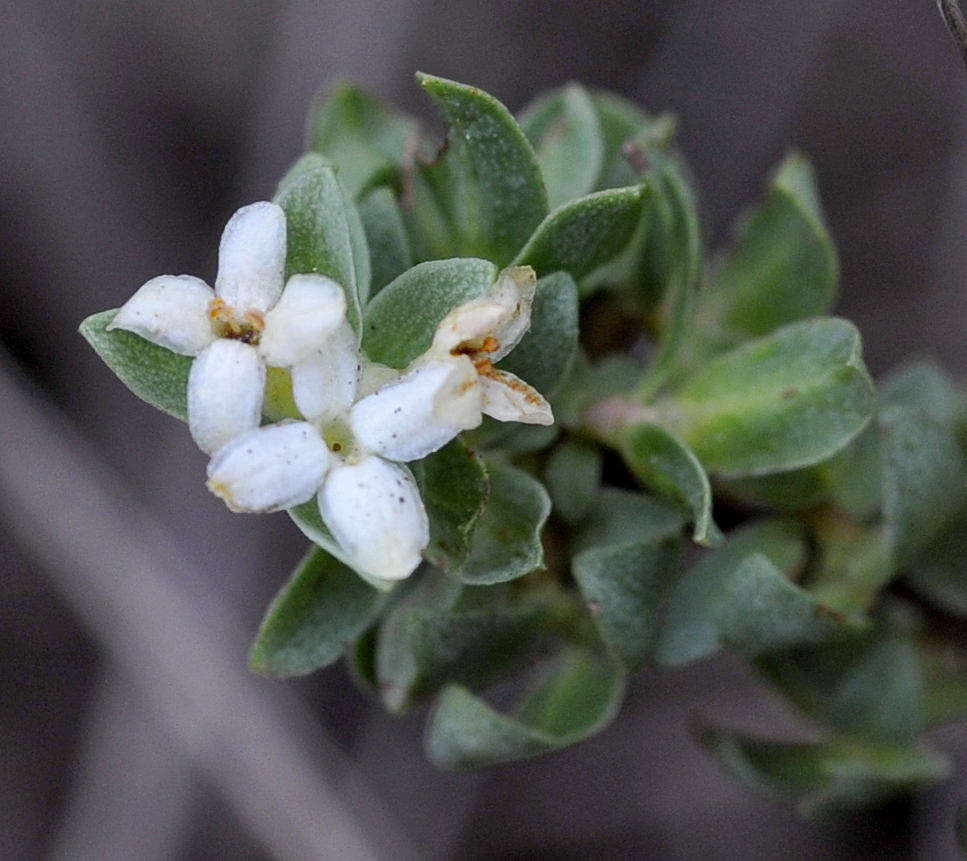

Conservation status
- Critically endangered (EPBC Act)

Scientific classification
- Kingdom: Plantae
- Clade: Tracheophytes
- Clade: Angiosperms
- Clade: Eudicots
- Clade: Rosids
- Order: Malvales
- Family: Thymelaeaceae
- Genus: Pimelea
- Species: P. spinescens

Binomial name
- Pimelea spinescens Rye

= Pimelea spinescens =

Species of shrub

Pimelea spinescens, commonly known as plains rice-flower, spiny rice-flower or prickly pimelea, is a species of flowering plant in the family Thymelaeaceae and is endemic to Victoria. It is a spreading undershrub with elliptic leaves arranged in opposite pairs, and heads of white, cream-coloured or yellow flowers surrounded by 4 elliptic, leaf-like involucral bracts.

== Description ==
Pimelea spinescens is a spreading, stunted, long-lived undershrub that typically grows to a height of 5–30 cm (2.0–11.8 in). It has a deep taproot and its stems are glabrous, becoming spiny as they mature. The leaves are narrowly elliptic or elliptic, 2–10 mm (0.079–0.394 in) long and 1–3 mm (0.039–0.118 in) wide. The flowers are arranged in heads of 6 to 12 surrounded by 4 elliptic, sessile, leaf-like involucral bracts 3–7 mm (0.12–0.28 in) long and 1.5–4 mm (0.059–0.157 in) wide, male and female flowers usually on separate plants. The flowers are white, cream-coloured or yellow, the heads of male flowers erect and female heads drooping. The flower tube is 1.5–3 mm (0.059–0.118 in) long, the sepals 1–2 mm (0.039–0.079 in) long, and the stamens are shorter than the sepals. Flowering occurs in June and July.

== Taxonomy ==
Pimelea spinescens was first formally described in 1988 by Barbara Lynette Rye in Flora of Australia from specimens collected by Neville Scarlett near Myers Creek, (north of Healesville) in 1980. The specific epithet (spinescens) means "becoming thorny".

In the same publication, Rye described two subspecies of P. spinescens, and the names are accepted by the Australian Plant Census:

- Pimelea spinescens subsp. pubiflora Rye has hairy pedicels, and pale to bright lemon-yellow flowers that are hairy on the outside.
- Pimelea spinescens Rye subsp. spinescens has glabrous pedicels, and cream-coloured to white flowers that are glabrous on the outside.

== Distribution and habitat ==
Subspecies pubiflora was thought to be extinct since it had not been collected since 1901, but was rediscovered in 1980, growing in grassy woodland in the Wimmera region of Victoria. Subspecies spinescens grows mainly in grassland and open shrubland between Melbourne, Horsham and Echuca.

== Conservation status ==
Both subspecies of P. spinescens are listed as "critically endangered" under the Australian Government Environment Protection and Biodiversity Conservation Act 1999 and the Victorian Government Flora and Fauna Guarantee Act 1988. The main threats to the species include habitat loss and fragmentation, inappropriate fire regimes, weed invasion, and grazing by feral herbivores and livestock.
