= Kamel El Basha =

Palestinian actor and director

- كامل الباشا
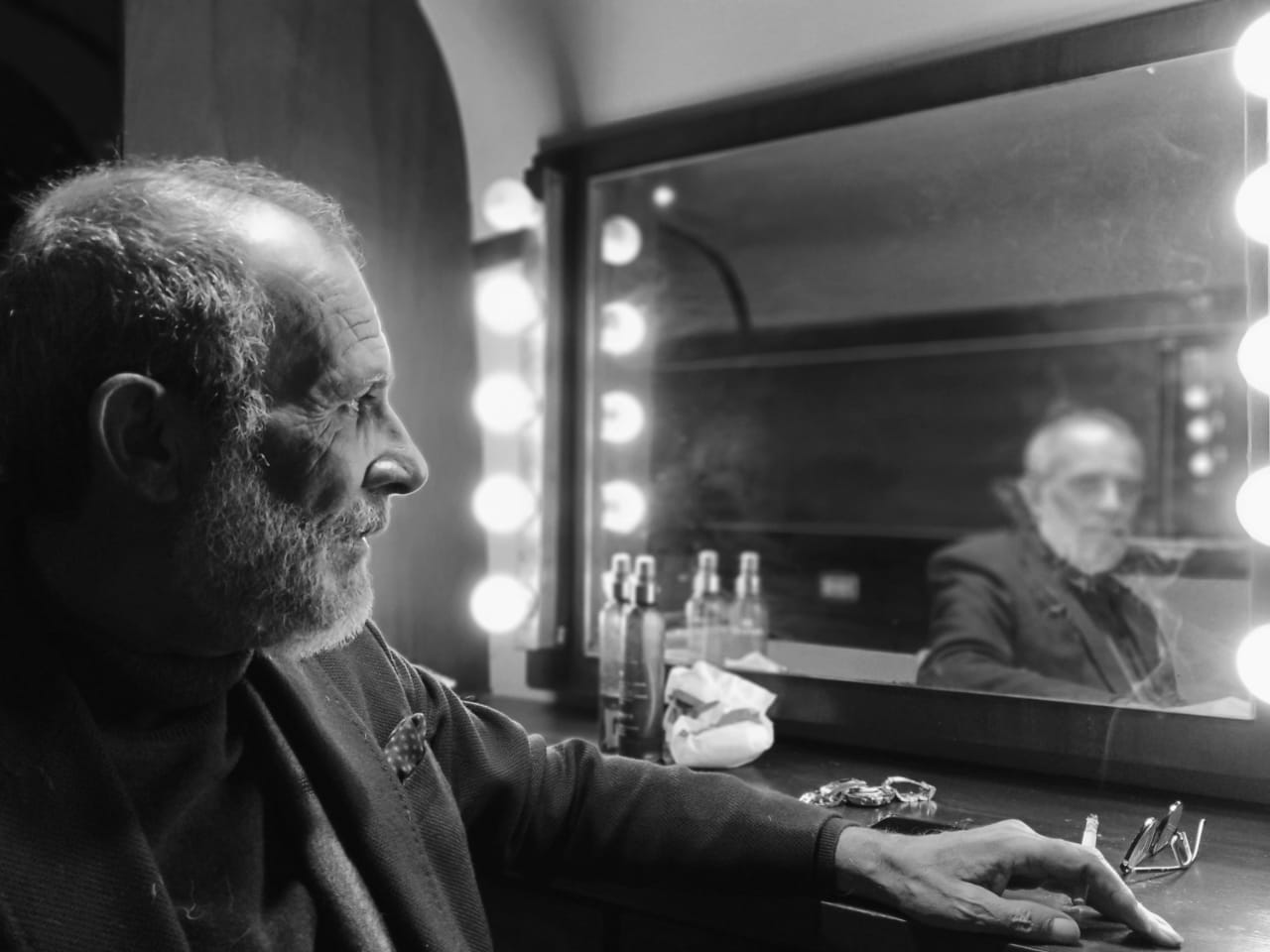
- Born: Malha , Jerusalem, Palestine
- Occupations: Actor, theatre director
- Years active: 1987–present
- Awards: Volpi Cup for Best Actor 2017
- Website: kamelelbasha.com

Kamel El Basha or Kamel el-Basha (Arabic: كامل الباشا; born c. 1962) is an actor, theatre director, teacher, and translator. He is best known for his performance in the film The Insult, for which he won the Volpi Cup for Best Actor.

== Early life ==
Kamel El Basha was born around 1962 in Malha, then a thriving village in Palestine known as al-Maliha, now a suburb in south-western Jerusalem, Israel. He recalls being five years old and running from his home with his family during the 1967 war, when Syrian, Jordanian, and Egyptian armies attack Israel.

As a child, when there was no television, he would perform for other children in the neighbourhood in his home.

El Basha studied theatre from 1979 to 1983. As a young man, he was imprisoned by the Israeli authorities for two years.

He studied theatre in Baghdad, Iraq.

== Acting career ==
El Basha has acted in, directed, and also written and translated plays for the stage.

He began his career as a stage actor after his release from prison, making a notable debut in the Arabic version of Brecht's The Exception and the Rule.

He has appeared in several Palestinian TV series and films, including Palestinian director Muayad Alayan's 2015 film Love, Theft and Other Entanglements, as well as his 2018 award-winning film about an affair between a married Israeli woman and a married Palestinian man, The Reports on Sarah and Saleem.

El Basha came to international attention for his role as Palestinian refugee Yasser Abdallah Salameh in the 2017 film The Insult by the Lebanese film director Ziad Doueiri. The film won several awards, and El Kamal won the Volpi Cup for Best Actor for his performance.

He starred in the 2023 short films An Orange in Jaffa and Palestinian Islands. Also in 2023, he played safecracker Youssef Mizouni in the eight-part British heist television series Culprits.

He plays a major role in the 2024 Australian TV series House of Gods as Sheikh Mohammad, airing on ABC TV aind ABC iview. The series has been selected to be screened in the French competition Series Mania, while El Basha was awarded with the Best Actor prize. This is an international competition dedicated to television series held in Lille since 2018. Sheikh Mohammad is an Iraqi imam, and the series focuses on relationships with his family, and among the Iraqi expatriate community living in Australia. Most of the other actors are Australian, including co-creator and co-star Osamah Sami, and Iraqi-born Maia Abbas. The series was filmed in western Sydney.

== Other activities ==
El Basha was artistic director of the Palestinian National Theater in Jerusalem from 2007 to 2011, and the artistic director of Quds Art from 2012.

== Awards ==
2017: Volpi Cup for Best Actor in the 74th Venice International Film Festival, for The Insult

== Personal life ==
El Basha is Muslim, while his wife is a Palestinian Christian woman. As of March 2024 they live in East Jerusalem.

He sees his acting talent as a "gift from God".

== Filmography ==
=== As actor ===
- 2002 : Case (حاله)
- 2009: Lesh Sabreen
- 2015: Love, Theft and Other Entanglements as Abu Mustafa
- 2015: Solomon's Stone as a police investigator
- 2017: The Insult as Yasser Abdallah Salameh
- 2018: The Reports on Sarah and Saleem as Abo epraheem
- 2019 : Green Grass as Hussen
- 2020: The Translator as Prof Raed (also starring Palestinian actor Ziad Bakri)
- 2020: Carfew as Yihia
- 2022: Room 207 as Mina (TV)
- 2023: Culprits as Youssef Mizouni
- 2024: House of Gods as Sheikh Mohammad
- 2024: An Orange from Jaffa (Short film)
- 2025: Palestine 36
- 2026: Sohab El Ard as Ibrahim (TV)
- 2026: Conversation with the Sea

=== Others ===
- 2014: Al Helm: Martin Luther King in Palestine (documentary), writer and director
- 2016 : Defying my disability (documentary), executive producer

== Selected theatre credits ==
=== Directing ===
- Suquut al Qastal (سقوط القسطل)
- Ness Kiis Rasas (نص كيس رصاص)
- Al Qamees al Masruq (القميص المسروق)
- Madeenat al Sa'aada (مدينة السعادة)
- Ward wa Yasmeen (ورد وياسمين)
- Al Arees (العريس)
- Sahra Maqdisiyyah (سهرة مقدسية)

=== Acting ===
- Al Qamees al Masruq (القميص المسروق)
- Al Aydi al Qazira (الأيدي القذرة)
- Al Zeer Salem (الزير سالم)
- Mawta bila Qubuur (موتى بلا قبور)
- Hajar al Tahqeeq (حجر التحقيق)
