= West Beirut (disambiguation) =

West Beirut was for 15 years the name of the western side of Beirut, during the Lebanese Civil War.

West Beirut (film), a 1998 Lebanese drama film written and directed by Ziad Doueiri.
