= Yasmina Khadra =

Expatriate Algerian novelist living in France

- ياسمينة خضراء
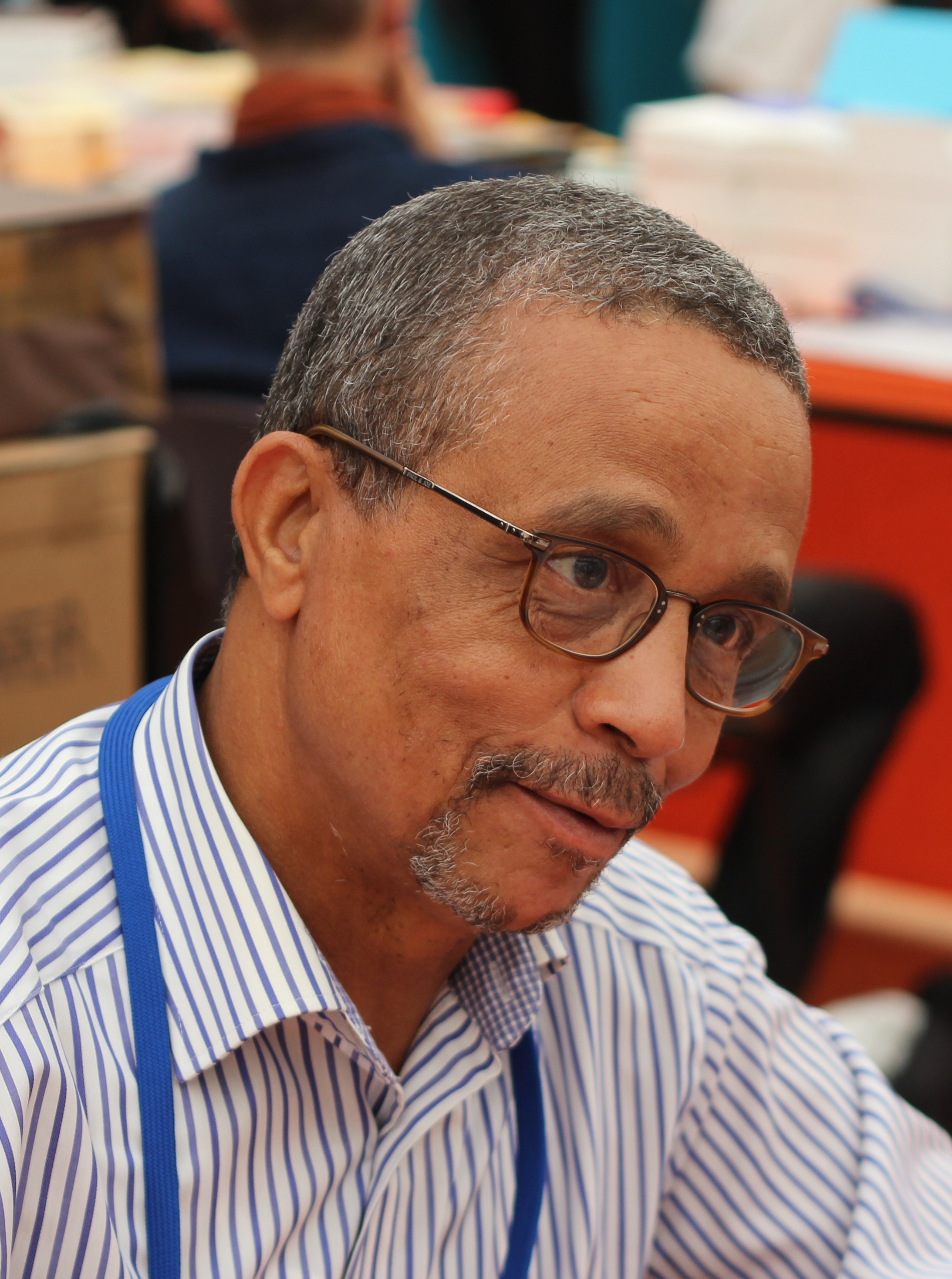
- Khadra in 2014
- Born: Mohammed Moulessehoul; 10 January 1955 (age 71); Kénadsa, Béchar Province, Algeria
- Occupation: Novelist
- Writing career
- Pen name: Yasmina Khadra
- Language: French
- Notable works: Algerian trilogy; The Swallows of Kabul; The Attack; What the Day Owes the Night
- Notable awards: Henri Gal Literature Grand Prize – 2011; Order of Arts and Letters, Officer

Mohammed Moulessehoul (Arabic: محمد مولسهول; born 10 January 1955), better known by the pen name Yasmina Khadra (Arabic: ياسمينة خضراء), is an Algerian author living in France, who writes in French. One of the most famous Algerian novelists in the world, he has written almost 40 novels, and has published in more than 50 countries. Khadra has often explored Algerian and other Arab countries' civil wars, depicting Muslim conflicts and reality, the attraction of radical Islamism to those alienated by the incompetence and hypocrisy of politicians, and conflicts between East and West. In his several writings on the Algerian war, he has exposed the regime and the fundamentalist opposition as the joint guilty parties in the country's tragedy.

== Biography ==
=== Early life, and short stories ===
Moulessehoul was born in 1955 in Kénadsa, in the Algerian Sahara. His mother, of nomadic origins, was her tribe's "chief storyteller". His father, initially a nurse, joined the Algerian National Liberation army, as Algeria began to fight for independence from France. He became an officer, wounded in 1958. Parents sent their three sons, Mohammed aged nine and later his two younger brothers, to the cadet school of Revolution in El Mechouar Palace, Tlemcen. Khadra describes the beginning of his passion for writing in his autobiography entitled The Writer, in this way he was able to keep privacy that he missed in the cadet dormitories. At first, he wanted to be a poet in the Arabic language, but met a professor of French origin.

While at military school, at age 18, he finished his first volume of short stories, which was to appear eleven years later as Houria (1984).

=== Military career, first novels, and Algerian trilogy ===
At age 23, Khadra graduated from the Cherchell Military Academy (AMC), and joined the armed forces as a second lieutenant. He has published three collections of short stories and three novels under his real name between 1984 and 1989.

In the early nineties, as a commander in the special forces, he was stationed at the Algerian-Moroccan border and in Oran Province, during the military deployment against Islamic fundamentalists, AIS and GIA. He suffered three nervous breakdowns, escaped two ambushes and was three times forced to land in a helicopter.

In order to avoid a 1988 regulation, obliging soldiers to submit any written works to a military censorship board, Khadra published his further works under different pseudonyms, including 'Commissaire Llob'. Brahim Llob is also the name of the protagonist in a series of detective novels – the incorruptible, increasingly helpless police detective, who uncovers the grievances of Algerian society, including corruption and cliquism, and as a result, gets between the frontlines of the Islamists and the powerful elite.

Following the publication of his first two books, Khadra could only get published abroad. To bypass the censorship, his wife signed his publishing contracts; in homage he later took as his pen name her first two names – Yasmina Khadra ("green jasmine blossom").

In 1997, Khadra published the detective novel Morituri (Eng. 2003), which was to bring him international recognition. Okacha Touita adapted and directed the film under the same title in 2004. Together with volumes Double Blank (1998, Eng. 2005) and Autumn of the Phantoms (1998, Eng. 2006), they form a trilogy, which portrays the Algerian Civil War and its background in a way that is both authentic and interesting. He has written these novels with a European (French) readership in mind as they focus on the psychological and social causes of Islamic fundamentalism using precise documentary detail and emotional intensity. He describes, from the perspective of Inspector Llob, Algerian everyday life and its omnipresent violence – bombings, corruption and the lack of economic prospects for large parts of the population. With these novels, he has succeeded in anchoring the genre detective novel in Algerian literature. Together with his earlier books, Le Dingue au bistouri (1990) and La Foire des enfoirés (1993), they meet the formal criteria of the French roman noir subgenre. In the final volume, the protagonist is discovered as the author behind the pseudonym Yasmina Khadra, is suspended from service, and dies.

Khadra himself managed to escape the same fate. In 2000, he quit the army to concentrate on literature and went with his family into exile in France via Mexico.

=== France, over 30 novels ===
Khadra settled in Aix-en-Provence. In 2001, he published an autobiography entitled The Writer (L'Écrivain), in which he wrote about his life as a soldier and as a writer, receiving 'Médaille de vermeil' award from the French Academy. That same year, he revealed his true identity. In respect for his wife, who had laid the economic basis for the new beginning in France through trips and negotiations with publishers, he decided to keep the pen name. His pseudonym posed initially a problem and rumours, from a public point of view it was a sensation:

The woman who had written several well-received novels in French and who had as a result been clasped to the Gallic literary bosom as a writer who would, finally, give an insight into what Arab women were really thinking, turned out to be a man called Mohammed Moulessehoul. And not just a man, but an Algerian army officer with three decades of military experience behind him. And not just an army officer, but one who had led a struggle against armed Islamist radicals and who, as a result, faced opprobrium in the French media for being tainted with the blood of civilians killed in brutal oppression by the north African state.

One of French critics noted eventually however: "A he or a she? It doesn't matter. What matters is that Yasmina Khadra is today one of Algeria's most important writers". Although Khadra lives in France, he does not allow himself to be absorbed by the western point of view, but rather advocates getting to know and understanding.

His Algerian trilogy was followed in 2002 by The Swallows of Kabul (Eng. 2004), in which action takes place in 1998's Afghanistan. The novel depicts the dictatorship of the Talibans and the condition of the Afghan woman. In an interview with the German radio station SWR1 in 2006, Khadra said:

The West interprets the world as it likes. It develops certain theories that fit into its world outlook, but do not always represent the reality. Being a Muslim, I suggest a new perspective on Afghanistan, on religious fanaticism and what I would call religiopathy. My novel The Swallows of Kabul gives readers in the West a chance to understand the core of a problem that they usually only touch on the surface. Because fanaticism is a threat for all, I contribute to the understanding of its causes and backgrounds. Perhaps then it will be possible to find a way to bring it under control.

Adam Piore of Newsweek wrote: "Yet it is the journey into the beaten souls of Khandra's characters that makes this book so affecting. Few writers have so powerfully conveyed what it feels like to live in a totalitarian society, where uncompromising zealotry has thoroughly penetrated the national psyche. This book is a masterpiece of misery." The Swallows of Kabul was shortlisted for the IMPAC International Dublin Literary Award in 2006. The novel was adapted to animated film under the same title in 2019.

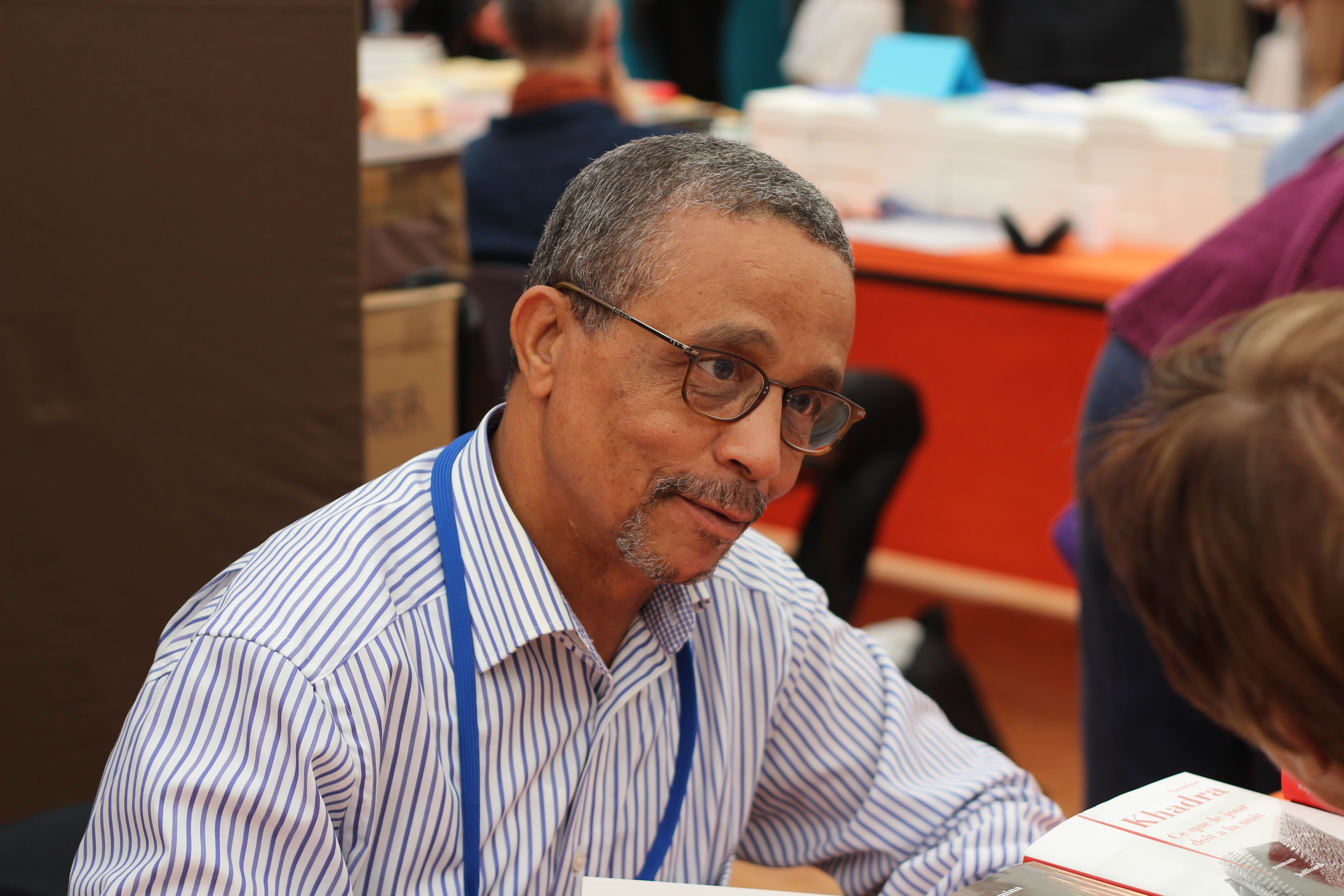
Khadra at the book festival in 2014

In 2004, Khadra published the crime novel Dead Man's Share (Eng. 2009), in which his character Llob becomes the plaything of the mighty in post-colonial Algeria.

The Attack (2005, Eng. 2006) explores the Israeli-Palestinian conflict and follows the life of an Arab Israeli couple living in Tel Aviv. The protagonist is a well-established medical doctor whose life is turned upside down when his wife becomes an Islamist terrorist and a suicide bomber. The novel received several literary prizes in 2006, including Prix des libraires – a prize chosen by about five thousand bookstores in France, Belgium, Switzerland, and Canada – as the first Algerian laureate. In 2008, The Attack was shortlisted for the IMPAC award, his second work nominated. The novel's film adaptation, The Attack (2012) by Ziad Doueiri, garnered positive critics' reviews. In The Sirens of Baghdad, published in 2006 (Eng. 2007), Khadra looks at the Iraq War.

What the Day Owes the Night(2008, Eng. 2010) is a saga that takes place in Algeria between 1930 and 1962 and depicts a courageous defence of the double Franco-Algerian culture. "Broader in its canvas then his page-turning stories of Baghdad or Kabul [..] tale of family, love and war [...] Rich in incident and character (and ably translated by Frank Wynne), the novel shows us from within the colonised Algeria that Camus – as he acknowledged – could only glimpse as an outsider." Film adaptation under the same title (2012) did not meet commercial expectations, but was positively reviewed.

In 2011, Khadra was awarded the honorary Henri Gal Grand Prize for Literature by the French Academy.

Reviewing his novel Cousin K (2003, Eng. 2013), Steve Emmet of the New York Journal of Books wrote "Cousin K may be a small book but it is a giant of a literary work." In Khalil (2018, Eng. 2021), Khadra puts himself in the shoes of a Belgian terrorist of Moroccan origin, who blew himself up in Paris in November 2015. This novel was one of the best-selling books in France in 2018.

His novels have been translated into 48 languages, and published in 56 countries. Besides film adaptations, including international productions, they were also adapted to theatre, and comics.

In 2007–2014, he served as director of the Algerian Cultural Center in Paris, at the request of President of Algeria Abdelaziz Bouteflika. Khadra was removed from this position, after he had described the fourth term of President as "absurdity".

=== 2014 presidential campaign ===
On 2 November 2013, Khadra announced his candidacy for the presidency of Algeria. He was however unable to qualify, collecting only 43,000 of the 90,000 signatures required.

== Publications ==
=== As Muhammad Moulessehoul ===
- 1984: Amen! (Algeria)
- 1984: Houria: stories (Algeria)
- 1985: La fille du pont (The girl on the bridge, Algeria)
- 1986: El-Kahira, cellule de la mort (El Kahira: cell of death)
- 1988: De l'autre coté de la ville (The other side of the city)
- 1989: Le privilège du phénix (The privilege of the phoenix, Algeria)

=== As Yasmina Khadra ===
- 1990: Le Dingue au bistouri. Book 1 of Superintendent Llob Series
- 1993: La Foire des enfoirés: les enquêtes du Commissaire Llob (The Idiots' Fair: the Investigations of Commissioner Llob). Book 2 of Superintendent Llob Series
- 1997: Morituri, translated by David Herman (Toby Press, 2003). Book 3rd of Superintendent Llob Series, 1st of an Algerian trilogy
- 1998: Double Blank (Double blanc), translated by Aubrey Botsford (Toby Press, 2005). Book 4 of Superintendent Llob Series, 2nd of an Algerian trilogy
- 1998: Autumn of the Phantoms (L'Automne des Chimères), translated by Aubrey Botsford (Toby Press, 2006). Book 5 of Superintendent Llob Series, 3rd of an Algerian trilogy
- 1998: In the Name of God (Les Agneaux du Seigneur), translated by Linda Black (2000)
- 1999: Wolf Dreams (À quoi rêvent les loups), translated by Linda Black (2003).
- 2001: The Writer (L'Écrivain)
- 2002: The Imposture of Words (L'Imposture des mots)
- 2002: The Swallows of Kabul (Les Hirondelles de Kaboul), translated by John Cullen (Nan A. Talese/Doubleday, 2004)
- 2003: Cousine K, translated by Donald Nicholson-Smith, Alyson Waters
- 2004: Dead Man's Share (La part du mort), translated by Aubrey Botsford (Toby Press, 2009). Book 6 of Superintendent Llob Series
- 2005: The Attack (L'Attentat), translated by John Cullen (Nan A. Talese, 2006)
- 2006: The Sirens of Baghdad (Les Sirènes de Bagdad), translated by John Cullen (Nan A. Talese, 2007)
- 2008: What the Day Owes the Night (Ce que le jour doit à la nuit), translated by Frank Wynne (2010)
- 2011: The African Equation (L'Équation africaine), translated by Howard Curtis (Gallic Books, 2015)
- 2013: The Angels Die (Les anges meurent de nos blessures), translated by Howard Curtis (2016)
- 2014: Qu'attendent les singes
- 2015: The Dictator's Last Night (La dernière nuit du rais), translated by Julian Evans (Gallic Books, 2015)
- 2016: Dieu n'habite pas La Havane
- 2018: Khalil (Khalil), translated by John Cullen (Nan A. Talese, 2021)
- 2019: L’outrage fait à Sarah Ikker Éditions Julliard, Paris
- 2022: Les Vertueux, aux éditions Mialet-Barrault
- 2024: Coeur-d'amande, aux éditions Mialet-Barrault
- 2026 : Le prieur de Bethléem, édition Flammarion, january 2026 (ISBN 9782080149671)

=== Filmography ===
- 2014: Two Men in Town, by Rachid Bouchareb, co-screenwriter

== Film adaptations ==
- 2007: Morituri, by Okacha Touita
- 2007: Dhokha, by Pooja Bhatt
- 2012: What the Day Owes the Night, by Alexandre Arcady
- 2012: The Attack, by Ziad Doueiri
- 2019: The Swallows of Kabul, by Zabou Breitman

== Awards and honours ==
- 2001: 'Médaille de vermeil', an award by Institut de France upon proposal of French Academy – The Writer
- 2005: "Best Book of 2005" by the San Francisco Chronicle and The Christian Science Monitor
- 2006: Prix des libraires, a prize chosen by about five thousand bookstores in France, Belgium, Switzerland, and Canada – The Attack (L'Attentat)
- 2006: Prix Tropiques (AFD Literary Prize) – The Attack
- 2011: Henri Gal Literature Grand Prize, an honorary award by Institut de France upon the proposal of French Academy
- 2018: Grand Prix of Literary Associations (Belles-Lettres category) – Khalil
- 2025 : Pepe Carvalho Awards
- 2025 : Casa Mediterráneo Awards

== See also ==
- Algerian literature
- List of Algerian writers
- African literature
- List of African writers by country
