= The Swallows of Kabul (film) =

2019 film

- Film poster
- Directed by: Zabou Breitman; Éléa Gobbé-Mévellec
- Screenplay by: Zabou Breitman; Patricia Mortagne; Sébastien Tavel
- Based on: The Swallows of Kabul by Yasmina Khadra
- Produced by: Michel Merkt; Reginald de Guillebon
- Starring: Zita Hanrot; Swann Arlaud; Simon Abkarian; Hiam Abbass; Jean-Claude Deret; Michel Jonasz; Sébastien Pouderoux; Serge Bagdassarian
- Edited by: Françoise Bernard
- Music by: Alexis Rault
- Production companies: Les Armateurs; Mélusine Productions; Close Up Films
- Distributed by: Memento Distribution (France); Filmcoopi (Switzerland); Imagine Film Distribution (Benelux)
- Release date: 16 May 2019 (Cannes)
- Running time: 81 minutes
- Countries: France; Switzerland; Luxembourg; Monaco
- Language: French
- Box office: $2.4 million

The Swallows of Kabul (French: Les hirondelles de Kaboul) is a 2019 internationally co-produced adult animated psychological drama film directed by Zabou Breitman and Eléa Gobé Mévellec. It was screened in the Un Certain Regard section at the 2019 Cannes Film Festival. The film is an adaption of the novel of the same name by Yasmina Khadra.

== Cast ==
- Hiam Abbass as Mussarat
- Zita Hanrot as Zunaira
- Swann Arlaud as Mohsen
- Simon Abkarian as Atiq

== Synopsis ==
The action takes place in the summer of 1998, in the capital of Afghanistan, which has been governed by the Taliban for two years.

Atiq, the director of the women's prison, is a veteran of the war against the Soviets and many of his former comrades have relocated to the Taliban officers and reproach him for his taciturn attitude. In addition to the fact that this patriot does not recognize himself in the Taliban fight, he is recovering badly from a leg injury that causes him to limp and his wife, Mussarat, suffers from terminal cancer. Because she was a nurse at the front, she saved his life in the past, he is totally devoted to her, although he is quite incapable of consoling her. But when he looked for support from his friends who were better placed to have her treated, he was told: "It is God who saved your life, no man ever owes anything to a woman."

Mohsen and Zunaira are a young couple, they have a university education and cannot stand the strict Islamic rules imposed on the population. They dream of teaching in the clandestine school of Professor Bayazid, who secretly delivers, in parallel with the Koranic education promoted by the Taliban, a real education. We discover, by chance in the streets, a whole population of poor children left to their own devices, exposed to inhuman spectacles. In order not to have to wear the burqa, Zunaira prefers to stay at home. One day, Mohsen sees a stoning of a woman for being a prostitute. Carried away by the movement of the crowd, he takes a stone and throws it at the condemned woman, causing the woman's head to bleed out profusely and die shortly after.

Mohsen and Zunaira decide to go out for a walk together, but Zunaira is imprudent enough to wear, out of sight, she believes, under her burqa, a pair of white shoes and here they are caught in the street laughing out loud, two forbidden things. Mohsen is beaten and forcibly taken away to attend the sermon at the mosque, while Zunaira is forced to wait barefoot in the sun. Deeply humiliated by this incident, Zunaira holds a grudge against Mohsen for his passivity and her hatred of the Taliban is increased tenfold. Mohsen then confesses to her that he has participated in a stoning, aggravating Zunaira's resentment, who refuses to talk to him and punishes him by imposing the burqa on herself at home. When the argument breaks, Zunaira pushes Mohsen, who falls backwards. His head hits a piece of furniture, and he dies. Although it was an accident, desperate, Zunaira blames herself for Mohsen’s murder and she is sentenced to death. She is thrown into a cell in preparation for a large execution meeting to be held at the stadium in the coming days. And here she is incarcerated in the meantime, the only inmate of the prison where Atiq works, assisted by two guards and a few soldiers.

Now indifferent to the rigors of Sharia law, Zunaira removes her burqa in her cell, and Atiq is struck by her youth and beauty. Infatuated with his prisoner, whose frescoes of moving eroticism he discovers at the home deserted by the young couple, he sets out to save her at all costs. He first tries to plead her case with his former friend, Quassim, who has become a fairly high-ranking Taliban leader. It is in a brothel that he finds him and suffers a failure: Quassim humiliatingly sends him back to his business. He cannot help but investigate the case of this singular murderess and discovers that the husband's death is in fact purely accidental, which pushes him to go to the judges (the cadis), but the judges, instead of considering a review of the trial, order him not to concern himself with their verdicts. His approach comes to the ears of Quassim who, anxious not to disappoint his own superiors and to offer a fine execution — the meeting is organized in honor of a Pakistani delegation —, instructs one of his henchmen to keep a close watch on Atiq and the prison.

Atiq's wife realizes that her husband is in love with the prisoner and, far from condemning him, is moved to see that he is capable of feelings, which she had come to doubt. On the verge of death, she decides to sacrifice herself to allow him to live this unexpected love. She takes advantage of the anonymity imposed by the chadri to replace Zunaira at the crucial moment and perish in her place. Atiq, for his part, whose sensitivity and lameness have made us forget that he was a tried and tested fighter, kills with his bare hands the armed Taliban in charge of monitoring him.

On the day scheduled for the execution, the condemned woman (in a burqa) is fetched. But the Taliban leader, worried about the disappearance of his henchman, demands that Atiq attend the execution. At the stadium, the condemned woman is executed with a bullet in the back of the head. Quassim, seized with doubt, uncovers his face and realizes the substitution. Mad with rage, he kills Atiq, who falls next to his sacrificed wife. Quassim rushes at the women present to tear off their burqas in the hope of finding the real condemned woman. In vain, the women scatter like a flock of swallows.

Zunaira takes advantage of her luck and takes refuge with Professor Bayazid: she will teach in his clandestine school.

== Reception ==
After being screened at the Annecy International Animated Film Festival, OneOfUs.net called it a "great piece of animation and a very interesting character study that constantly keeps you emotionally invested and guessing as to what is going to happen next".

== Accolades ==
Year	Award	Category	Recipient	Result
2018	Annecy International Animated Film Festival	Gan Foundation Award for Distribution	The Swallows of Kabul	Won
2019	Cannes Film Festival	Un Certain Regard	The Swallows of Kabul	Nominated
2019	European Film Awards	European Animated Feature Film	The Swallows of Kabul	Nominated
2020	César Award	Best Animated Film	The Swallows of Kabul	Nominated
