= West Beirut =

Part of divided Beirut from 1975 to 1990, known as the "Muslim area"

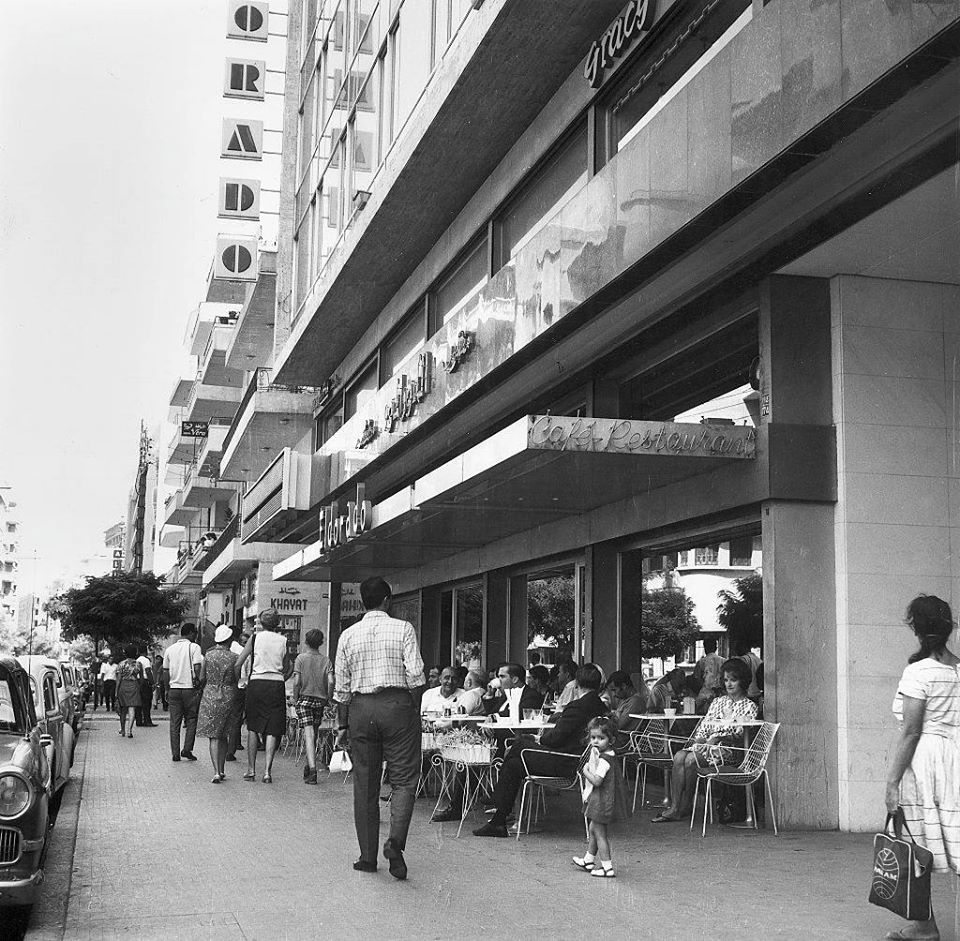
Hamra Street in West Beirut (late 1960s)

West Beirut (Arabic: بيروت الغربية) is a term referring to the western part of Beirut, the Lebanese capital, which became popular during the Lebanese Civil War which lasted from 1975 to 1990, when the city was divided along sectarian lines into two main areas: West Beirut, which was known as the "Muslim area", and East Beirut, which was known as the "Christian area", with the "Green Line" as a dividing line between them. Anyone who dared to cross the "Green line" was shot by the militias.

== Features ==
The area includes many neighborhoods such as Hamra, Ras Beirut, Mousaitbeh, and Ain El Mreisseh. Historically, West Beirut has played an important cultural and political role in Lebanon, and is characterized by prestigious universities like the American University of Beirut (AUB) and the Lebanese American University (LAU), as well as cultural landmarks like the Corniche and several cinemas and theaters that flourished before the war.

Historically, West Beirut has been a hub of cultural, intellectual, and political activity, attracting a diverse population. Its streets were alive with artists, journalists, and political activists, making it a focal point of discourse and resistance throughout Lebanon's turbulent history.

== Lebanese Civil War ==
The Leftist militias controlled the western part of Beirut under the framework of the Lebanese National Movement, which included the Druze Progressive Socialist Party, the Shiite Amal Movement, the Sunni Al-Mourabitoun, and the Secular Lebanese Communist Party, while the Christian Lebanese Forces controlled the other part of the capital (East Beirut). In the late 1970s, within the framework of the Arab Deterrent Forces, the Syrian 85th Infantry Brigade was deployed in Beirut. West Beirut was famous for its inclusion of the civil government of Salim al-Hoss (supported by Syria), as opposed to the military government headed by Michel Aoun in East Beirut.

=== Israeli Invasion of 1982 ===
In 1982, West Beirut was the focus of international attention during the Israeli invasion of Lebanon, known as Operation Peace for Galilee. The invasion aimed to dismantle the PLO’s military infrastructure and expel it from Lebanon.

- Israeli forces encircled West Beirut, subjecting it to a brutal siege that lasted from June to August 1982.
- The area endured relentless shelling and airstrikes, resulting in significant civilian casualties and widespread destruction.

The siege ended with a negotiated withdrawal of PLO fighters and the deployment of multinational peacekeeping forces, including troops from the United States, France, and Italy.

=== Sabra and Shatila Massacre ===
One of the most infamous events associated with West Beirut during the civil war was the Sabra and Shatila massacre, which took place from September 16 to 18, 1982, shortly after the assassination of President-elect Bashir Gemayel on September 14, which took place 3 weeks after his election. The following day, September 15, Israeli forces advanced into west Beirut. Over the next three days, Lebanese militiamen carried out an operation in the Sabra and Shatila refugee camps, which resulted in the death of hundreds of Palestinian civilians.

- Lebanese Christian Phalangist militias, allied with Israel, entered the Sabra and Shatila refugee camps in West Beirut, ostensibly to root out remaining PLO fighters.
- Over the course of three days, hundreds of Palestinian civilians, including women and children, were brutally massacred.
- The massacre shocked the world and led to widespread condemnation of Israel’s role, as Israeli forces were accused of facilitating the militias' actions by allowing them access to the camps.

== West Beirut film ==
There is a Lebanese film of the same name, West Beirut, directed by Ziad Doueiri, which was released in 1998, whose story takes place during the civil war, telling the story of a group of kids living in Beirut during that period. The film highlights their experiences and dreams in a world full of conflicts.

== Sources ==
- El-Masri, Souheil (1989). "Displacements and Reconstruction: The Case of West Beirut – Lebanon". Disasters. 13 (4): 334–344. Bibcode:1989Disas..13..334E. doi:10.1111/j.1467-7717.1989.tb00727.x. ISSN 0361-3666. PMID 20958687.
- Yassin, Nasser (2012). "Beirut". Cities. 29 (1): 64–73. doi:10.1016/j.cities.2011.02.001.
