= The Reports on Sarah and Saleem =

2018 Israeli-Palestinian film

- Film poster
- Directed by: Muayad Alayan
- Starring: Maisa Abd Elhadi; Mohammad Eid
- Release date: 28 January 2018 (IFFR)
- Running time: 127 minutes
- Countries: Palestine; Germany; Netherlands; Mexico
- Languages: Arabic; Hebrew; English

The Reports on Sarah and Saleem is a 2018 international co-production drama film directed by Palestinian filmmaker Muayad Alayan.

== Plot ==
The plot centres on an extramarital affair between a Palestinian man and an Israeli woman, Sarah and Saleem, both of whom are married. Sarah is a Jewish Israeli who owns a cafe in West Jerusalem, while Saleem is a Muslim Palestinian bakery delivery man from East Jerusalem. The second half of the film focuses on the personal and political fallout of the couple's affair, in which both of them are investigated by the authorities after Saleem is taken in by the Israeli army and brutally interrogated. Sarah's husband, David, is in the army.

== Cast ==
- Adeeb Safadi, as Saleem
- Sivane Kretchner, as Sarah
- Ishai Golan, as Sarah's husband, David
- Maisa Abd Elhadi, as Saleem's wife, Bisan
- Kamel El Basha, as Abu Ibrahim
- Hanan Hillo (aka Hanan Al Hillo), as Maryam

== Production ==
=== The director ===
The film is Palestininian filmmaker Muayad Alayan's second feature film as director, after Love, Theft and Other Entanglements (2015). Both films were written by his brother, Rami Alayan. Muayad Alayan (born 1985) is a Jerusalem-based filmmaker and cinematographer. He studied film in San Francisco, where his 2005 graduate project, a documentary film called Exiles in Jerusalem, won the Kodak Award. His short film debut Why Sabreen? (2009), made with and about the youth of his village, was screened and won awards at film festivals world. He has worked as a lecturer on film at several academic institutions in Palestine, and, with his brother Rami, co-founded PalCine Productions.

=== Cast and filming ===
The cast were carefully chosen: "We wanted the best actors for the roles, but we also wanted actors who in terms of the politics were people who would be okay working for us." (Muayad Alayan). Israeli actor Ishai Golan organises campaigns protesting against theatres that operate in Israeli settlements. Sivane Kretchner was targeted by the Israeli Ministry of Culture because of her role in the first Hebrew version of the British play My Name Is Rachel Corrie, about an American activist crushed to death by an Israeli military bulldozer at Jerusalem Khan Theatre.

During filming in Bethlehem, in the summer of 2017, Israeli military vehicles came and picked up the director, line producer, and art director for checks. After several hours, they told the filmmakers that even though they were filming in Palestinian territory (the West Bank), they had to let them know.

It is spoken in Arabic, Hebrew, and English, and is subtitled.

== Release ==
The film was screened at the Rotterdam Film Festival in February 2018, and at the Bristol Palestinian Film Festival (in Bristol, England in December 2018.

It was released in the US in June 2019.

== Reception ==
The Washington Post called it "a gripping new thriller", giving it 3.5 stars out of 5.

The Los Angeles Times wrote that the film "combines fine naturalistic acting and a psychologically complex script".

As of March 2024 the film has a 94% score on the critics' ratings on review aggregator Rotten Tomatoes, based on 32 reviews.

== Awards and nominations ==
- 2018: Winner, Hubert Bals Fund Audience Award, International Film Festival Rotterdam (IFFR)
- 2018: Winner, Best screenplay, to Rami Alayan, IFFR
- 2018: Winner, Grand Jury Prize at the Seattle International Film Festival
- 2018: Winner, Best Film, Durban International Film Festival
- 2018: Winner, Best Actress, Durban International Film Festival, for Maisa Abd Elhadi
