= Mohamad Chamas =

Lebanese actor

Mohamad Chamas is a Lebanese actor. In 1998 he was living in an orphanage, and had no acting experience, when director Ziad Doueiri cast him in a leading role in the critically acclaimed film West Beirut. He has been described as having "the explosiveness of James Cagney".

== Filmography ==
Year	Film
1998	Omar in West Beyrouth
2003	Abid in Blind Flight
