= Clermont-Ferrand International Short Film Festival =

Annual film festival in France

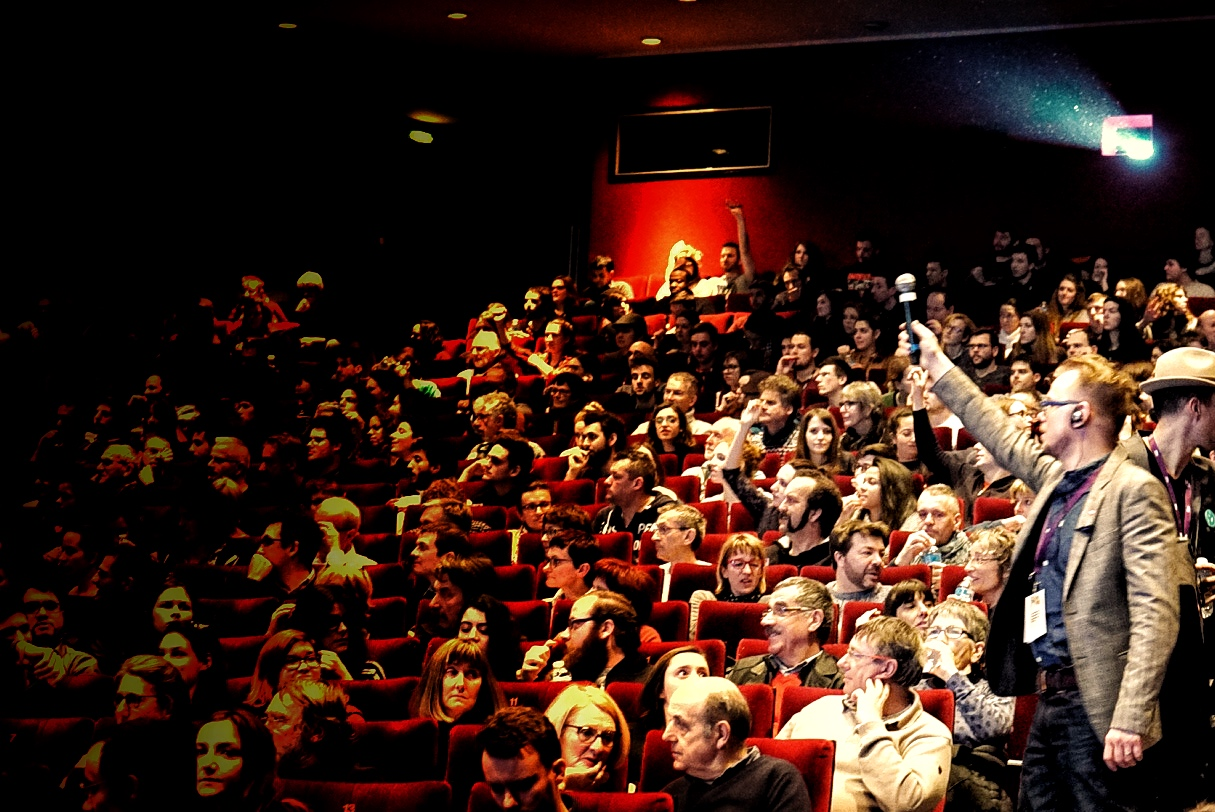
- Screening of SNCF Polar Shorts during the Clermont-Ferrand Short Film Festival, 2017
- Location: Clermont-Ferrand, France.
- Founded: 1979; 47 years ago
- Founded by: Antoine Lopez, Georges Bollon, Jean-Luc Mathion
- Most recent: January 30 — February 7, 2026
- Hosted by: Sauve qui peut le court métrage
- Website: clermont-filmfest.org

Clermont-Ferrand International Short Film Festival (Note: French: Festival international du court métrage de Clermont-Ferrand) is an international film festival dedicated to short films held annually in Clermont-Ferrand, France.

It is the second largest film festival in France after Cannes in terms of audience and professional attendance. Known as the best short film festival in France, Clermont-Ferrand unites around 160,000 professionals and filmgoers. Its industry platform, short film distribution system, and steady growth of the festival's attendance justify its right to be called the number one short film festival in the world.

== History ==
In 1979, a Short Film Week was organised by the Clermont-Ferrand University Film Society.

The festival founders then created the collective "Sauve qui peut le court métrage" (roughly translatable as "Short Film: S.O.S!") in 1981.

In 1982, the Festival became competitive, with a jury attributing awards to films selected from the recent French short film production. International films were shown in special programs highlighting a particular theme, genre, country or region of the world. The audience was also presented with tributes to the great short film makers of the past and present.

In 1986, the first Clermont-Ferrand Short Film Market was organized, with the intention to raise the economic profile of the short films. The market contains a video library for French and foreign television buyers, distributors and festival programmers to view all of the films in competition, as well as the films out of competition, that were submitted for consideration.

== The Festival ==
Clermont has been the biggest short film festival for 40 years, the essential meeting place for spectators, professionals, youngsters and school children. It's the second largest Festival in France after Cannes Film Festival, with more than 160,000 admissions for its 2023 event. It brings around €11m per year in additional economic spend to the region.

Audiences has a choice of 600 films, across all sections, and the three competitions (national, international and Lab). The programming team receives each year short films submissions between March and October. In 2024, 9400 films from various continents, including nearly 2000 French productions, were submitted.

== Awards ==
The 46th Festival (held February 2–10, 2024) awarded the International Grand Prix to An Orange from Jaffa, written and directed by Mohammed Almughann.

The 47th Festival (held January 31 — February 8, 2025) awarded the International Grand Prix to Unspoken by Damian Walshe-Howling (Australia).

The 48th Festival (held January 30 — February 7, 2026) awarded the International Grand Prix to Blue Heart by Samuel Suffren.

== Discoveries ==
The festival has revealed many directors who then launched their film career successfully, for example:

- Cédric Klapisch, winner of the Special Jury Prize in 1987 for In Transit (his graduation film), then again the Special Jury Prize in 1990 for I am moving
- Jean-Pierre Jeunet, winner of the Audience Award and Press Award in 1990 for Bullshit
- Jan Kounen, Prize winning research in 1994 for Vibroboy
- Erick Zonca, Grand Prix in 1995 for Eternal
- Shawn Christensen, winner of the 2012 International Audience Award for Curfew, went on to win the Oscar for Best Live Action Short Film at the 85th Academy Awards
- The short film Logorama which won the Oscar for best short film at the 82nd Academy Awards

== Numbers ==
- Almost 9,500 submissions from around 90 countries annually
- Approximately 500 films shown at each festival
- More than 9,000 accredited international visitors and 160,000 visitors annually
- Awards totalling more than 70,000 €
- Nominating festival César Awards, Academy Awards, British Academy Film Awards and European Short Film Audience Award
