= The Insult (film) =

2017 Lebanese film

- International film poster
- Arabic: قضية رقم ٢٣
- Literally: Case No. 23
- Directed by: Ziad Doueiri
- Written by: Ziad Doueiri; Joelle Touma
- Produced by: Rachid Bouchareb; Jean Bréhat; Julie Gayet; Antoun Sehnaoui; Nadia Turincev
- Starring: Adel Karam; Kamel El Basha; Diamand Bou Abboud
- Cinematography: Tommaso Fiorilli
- Edited by: Dominique Marcombe
- Music by: Éric Neveux
- Production companies: Ezekiel Films; Tessalit Productions; Rouge International
- Distributed by: Diaphana Films (France); Italia Film (Lebanon)
- Release dates: 31 August 2017 (Venice); 14 September 2017 (Lebanon); 31 January 2018 (France)
- Running time: 112 minutes
- Countries: Lebanon; France
- Language: Arabic
- Box office: $1.6 million

The Insult (Arabic: قضية رقم ٢٣, romanized: Qadiyya raqm 23, lit. 'Case No. 23', French: L'insulte) is a 2017 Lebanese legal drama film directed by Ziad Doueiri and co-written by Doueiri and Joelle Touma. It was screened in the main competition section of the 74th Venice International Film Festival. At Venice, Kamel El Basha won the Volpi Cup for Best Actor. It was selected as the Lebanese entry for the Best Foreign Language Film and was nominated for the Oscar at the 90th Academy Awards.

The film tells the story of two men: Tony George Hanna (Adel Karam), a Lebanese Christian mechanic, and Yasser Salameh (Kamel El Basha), a Palestinian foreman, who are embroiled in a court case which causes political upheaval in an already unstable country.

== Plot ==
Tony Hanna is a Lebanese Christian and devoted member of the Lebanese Forces, with a pregnant wife, Shirine. Not wanting workers near his property when Shirine is there, Tony discovers contractors modifying the gutter on his balcony. Tony smashes the gutter, to which the worker Yasser Abdallah Salameh calls Tony a "fucking prick". Tony recognizes Yasser as a Palestinian refugee by his accent; he watches anti-Palestinian propaganda and wishes for all Palestinians to leave the country. Although the balcony was in violation of building codes and the workers were fixing it, Tony demands an apology for the "fucking prick" remark from the company. The employers bring Yasser to Tony's garage to apologize in person; but after hearing a recorded speech by Christian leader Bachir Gemayel, Yasser begins to leave. Tony states he wishes Israeli prime minister Ariel Sharon had exterminated all Palestinians, causing Yasser to punch him instead, breaking two ribs.

Tony launches a lawsuit against Yasser, representing himself. However, when neither Yasser nor Tony can bring themselves to repeat what Tony said to Yasser about Sharon, the judge dismisses the case for inconclusive evidence. Enraged, Tony shouts the judge is corrupt and biased, and is removed from the courtroom but vows to appeal. He later collapses, and Shirine helps pull him up, later giving birth. The child is placed on life support, allegedly due to contractions Shirine experienced when she pulled up her husband and emotional shock at Yasser's assault. The case goes to retrial, with Yasser risking guilt of manslaughter if the child dies.

Wajdi Wehbe, a pro-Christian with memories of the Lebanese Civil War, becomes Tony's new representative, while Wajdi's own daughter, Nadine Wehbe, who has less memory of the war, takes Yasser's case. This time, Tony's comments about Sharon are placed before the court, with the argument that emotional distress provoked the assault; Shirine's history of miscarriages is also revealed. The arguments in the courtroom inflame memories of the civil war, leading to clashes in the streets between Christians and Muslims. With Wajdi underlining the importance of Sharon, Tony finds himself accused of Zionism and begins receiving death threats. Wajdi also characterizes Tony's comments as private and merely expressing a "wish", arguing this is not libel but freedom of thought.

In background research, Wajdi is surprised to learn Tony was born in Damour in 1970 and left in January 1976, a refugee of the Damour massacre when the city fell to Muslim and left-wing militants with help from Palestine Liberation Organisation units. Tony had not disclosed this to his own representation, and breaks down when Wajdi plays documentary footage of the event in the courtroom. Yasser and Tony later meet, and when Yasser says Christian suffering in the civil war was minimal compared to the Palestinians', Tony punches him and Yasser apologizes. Shirine and Tony's child recovers. Back at court, the judges find Yasser not guilty of assault. The pair appear to have reconciled by the end, exchanging a smile before parting.

== Cast ==
- Adel Karam as Tony George Hanna
- Kamel El Basha as Yasser Abdallah Salameh
- Rita Hayek as Shirine Hanna
- Camille Salameh as Wajdi Wehbe
- Diamand Bou Abboud as Nadine Wehbe
- Talal Jurdi as Talal
- Christine Choueiri as Manal Salameh
- Julia Kassar as Judge Colette Mansour
- Rifaat Torbey as Samir Geagea
- Carlos Chahine as Judge Chahine

== Historical references ==
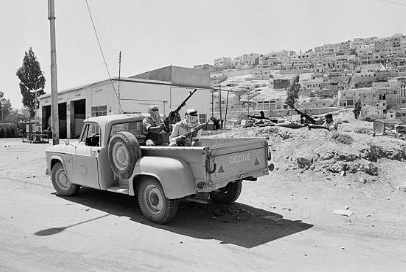
Black September is a historic event referenced in the film.

Each one of the two main characters is revealed to have been affected by a traumatic historical event in his youth: the Damour massacre in the case of Tony, and Black September in the case of Yasser. Moreover, there are references to Bachir Gemayel and Ariel Sharon, as prominent characters of the Lebanese civil war.

== Release ==
=== Box office ===
The Insult has grossed $685,901 in Lebanon, $850,711 in Italy and $57,790 in the Netherlands for a total of $1.6 million. In Lebanon, it was released on 12 January 2018 in three theaters and grossed to $24,600 in its opening weekend, and was ranked 42nd. In its second weekend the film dropped 6% to $23,222, finishing 44th. In its third weekend, the film went up 162% and made $60,872, finishing 36th. In Italy it grossed to $203,161 on its opening weekend and in the Netherlands $26,871 in 22 theaters.

=== Critical reception ===
2018 VOA interview with Ziad Doueiri about the film

As of June 2020, the film holds an 87% approval rating on review aggregator website Rotten Tomatoes, based on 114 reviews with an average rating of 7.47 out of 10. The website's critical consensus reads, "The Insult uses its familiar courtroom drama framework to deliver a hard-hitting statement on modern Middle Eastern politics that's as gripping as it is thought-provoking." On Metacritic, the film has a weighted average score of 72 out of 100, based on 25 critics, indicating "generally favorable reviews".

=== Accolades ===
Award	Date of ceremony	Category	Recipient(s)	Result	Ref(s)
Academy Awards	4 March 2018	Best Foreign Language Film	Ziad Doueiri	Nominated	
AFI Fest	9 – 16 November 2017	World Cinema Audience Award	Ziad Doueiri	Won	
David di Donatello	March 2018	Best Foreign Film	Ziad Doueiri	Nominated	
Palm Springs International Film Festival	2 – 15 January 2018	Bridging the Borders Award	Ziad Doueiri	Won	
Venice International Film Festival	30 August – 9 September 2017	Best Actor	Kamel El Basha	Won	

== See also ==
- List of submissions to the 90th Academy Awards for Best Foreign Language Film
- List of Lebanese submissions for the Academy Award for Best Foreign Language Film
