= Nayef Rashed =

British actor (born 1949)

- Born: 5 February 1949 (age 77); London, England
- Occupation: Actor
- Notable work: Only Fools and Horses, The Bill

Nayef Rashed (born 5 February 1949), also known as Adam Hussein, is an English actor. After training at London's Drama Centre, he has appeared in such television favourites as Only Fools and Horses, The Bill, and feature films such as Navy Seals. He appeared in the film Salmon Fishing in the Yemen as the Rebel Leader.

== Filmography ==
Year	Title	Role	Notes
1979	The Golden Lady	Mabrook	
1987	Ishtar	Mohamad. the Camel Seller	
1990	Navy Seals	Latanya Captain	
1994	Doomsday Gun	Iraqi Security Man	TV movie
1999	The Bill	Rival Café Owner	Episode: "Chasing Shadows"
2000	Room to Rent	Naief	
2001	The Parole Officer	Victor in Disguise	
2003	The Last Detective	Ben Youssef	Episode: "Tricia"
2003	Blind Flight	Industrial Cell - Militia Officer	
2005	Beneath the Skin	Stall Holder	TV movie
2005	The Crusaders		
2005	Charlie and the Chocolate Factory	Moroccan Market Vendor	
2005	Andalus	Old Man	
2006	Pleasure Marriage	Mohammed's father	Short
2003	The Path to 9/11	Ayman al-Zawahiri	2 episodes
2011	Salmon Fishing in the Yemen	Rebel Leader	
2013	The Bible	Pharaoh	Voice, TV Mini-Series documentary
2015	A.K.A Nadia	Briefing man	
2016	K-Shop	Zaki	
