= Palestine 36 =

2025 film by Annemarie Jacir

- UK theatrical release poster
- Arabic: فلسطين ٣٦
- Directed by: Annemarie Jacir
- Written by: Annemarie Jacir
- Produced by: Ossama Bawardi
- Starring: Hiam Abbass; Kamel El Basha; Yasmine Al Massri; Jalal Altawil; Robert Aramayo; Saleh Bakri; Yafa Bakri; Karim Daoud Anaya
- Cinematography: Hélène Louvart; Sarah Blum; Tim Fleming
- Edited by: Tania Reddin
- Music by: Ben Frost
- Production companies: Philistine Films; Autonomous; Corniche Media; MK Productions; Snowglobe; Metafora Production
- Distributed by: Curzon Film (United Kingdom); MAD Distribution (Middle East); Haut et Court (France)
- Release dates: 5 September 2025 (TIFF); 31 October 2025 (United Kingdom); 14 January 2026 (France)
- Running time: 120 minutes
- Countries: Palestine; United Kingdom; France; Denmark; Qatar; Saudi Arabia; Jordan
- Languages: Arabic; English
- Box office: $2 million

Palestine 36 (Arabic: فلسطين ٣٦) is a 2025 historical drama written and directed by Annemarie Jacir. The film recounts the 1936–1939 Arab revolt against British colonial rule in Palestine during the Mandate period. It stars Hiam Abbass, Kamel El Basha, Yasmine Al Massri, Jalal Altawil, Robert Aramayo and Saleh Bakri.

The film had its world premiere in the Gala Presentations section of the 2025 Toronto International Film Festival on 5 September, to a 20 minute standing ovation. It was selected as the Palestinian entry for the Best International Feature Film at the 98th Academy Awards, making the December shortlist. The film received generally positive reviews from critics, with some criticism of its alleged historical inaccuracies.

Israeli authorities banned the film in Jerusalem, after they detained the projectionist involved in one of the screenings for interrogation.

== Cast ==
- Hiam Abbass as Hanan
- Kamel El Basha as Abu Rabab
- Yasmine Al Massri as Khuloud Atef
- Jalal Altawil as Father Boulos
- Robert Aramayo as Captain Orde Wingate
- Saleh Bakri as Khalid
- Yafa Bakri as Rabab
- Karim Daoud Anaya as Yusuf Bassawi
- Wardi Eilabouni as Afra
- Ward Helou as Kareem
- Mo'min Swaitat as Sameh
- Billy Howle as Thomas Hopkins
- Dhaffer L'Abidine as Amir Atef
- Liam Cunningham as Charles Tegart
- Jeremy Irons as High Commissioner Arthur Wauchope
- Yumna Marwan as Um Kareem
- Sofia Asir as Dyala
- Sam Hoare as Diplomat Charles
- Eyad Hourani as Qusay

== Production ==
In February 2025, it was announced Hiam Abbass, Kamel El Basha, Yasmine Al Massri, Jalal Altawil, Robert Aramayo, Saleh Bakri, Yafa Bakri, Karim Daoud Anaya, Wardi Eilabouni, Ward Helou, Billy Howle, Dhafer L'Abidine, Liam Cunningham and Jeremy Irons had joined the cast of the film, with Annemarie Jacir directing from a screenplay she wrote. Curzon Film and MAD Distribution will distribute the film in the United Kingdom and Middle East, respectively.

Principal photography was set to take place in Palestine; however, the Gaza war in 2023 postponed production. Later the production was able to return and finish, making it the only feature film to shoot in Palestine in the past two years.

== Release ==
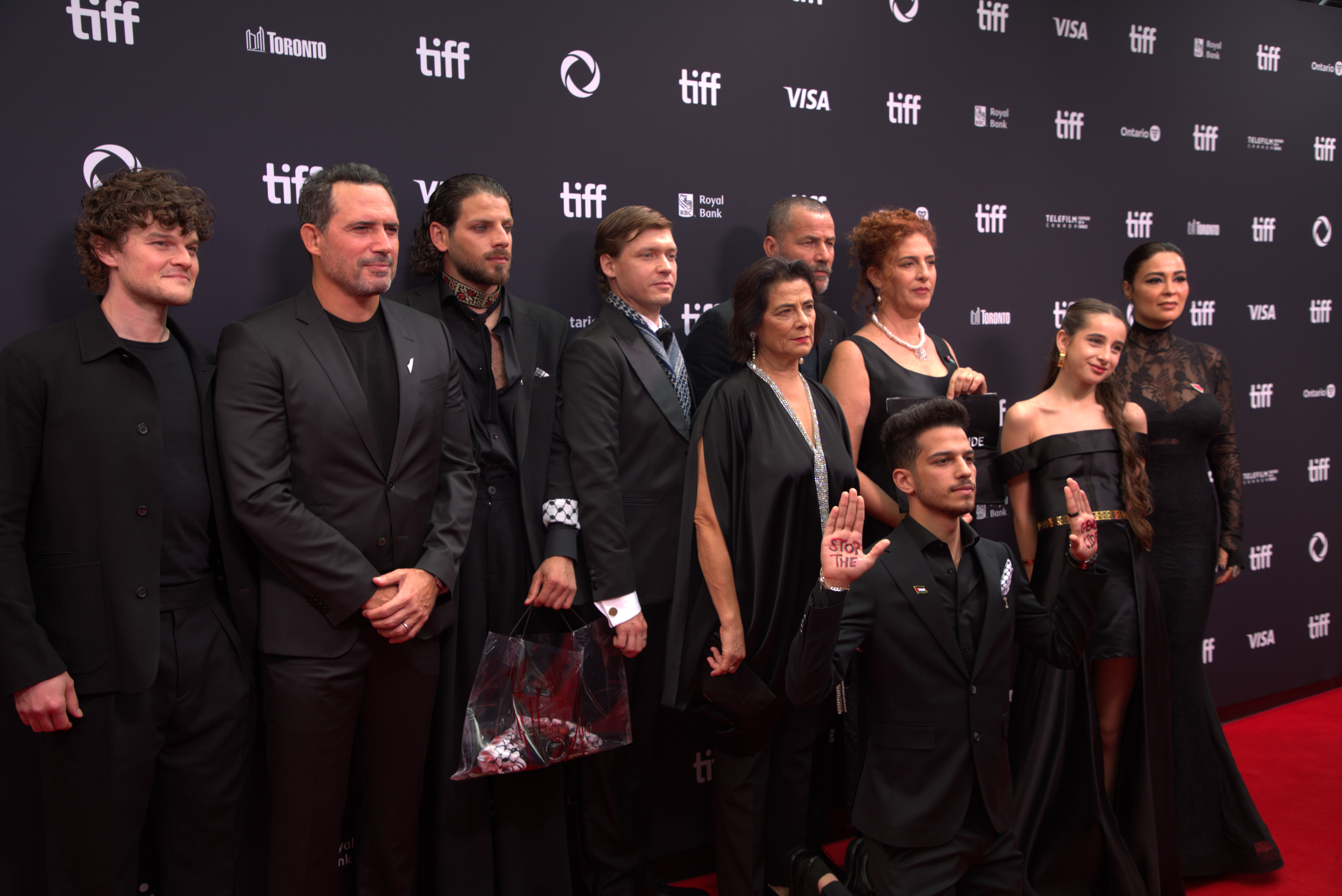
The cast and crew of Palestine 36 at the 2025 Toronto International Film Festival

The film had its world premiere in the Gala Presentations section of the 2025 Toronto International Film Festival on 5 September, to a 20 minute standing ovation. It received its European premiere as part of the Official Selection BFI London Film Festival 2025. The film was released in the United Kingdom on 31 October 2025, by Curzon Film. It won Best Film at the 38th Tokyo International Film Festival in November 2025. It was screened at the Coca-Cola Open Air Cinema at the 32nd Sarajevo Film Festival, in the Open Air section on 19 August 2026.

It was one of three films on Palestinian history to be submitted to the 98th Academy Awards for Best International Feature Film – the others being All That's Left of You and The Voice of Hind Rajab.

Curzon Film released the film in the United Kingdom on 31 October 2025. Haut et Court released the film in France on 14 January 2026. Prior to TIFF, Watermelon Pictures acquired the U.S. distribution rights to the film.

The film has been banned for screening in Jerusalem. During a raid on 22 January on a screening in East Jerusalem, Israeli police alleged that the projectionist was screening a film promoting work by a terrorist organization. The production company denied the allegations. Jacir has appealed against the ban.

== Reception ==
=== Critical response ===
On the review aggregator website Rotten Tomatoes, 98% of 65 critics' reviews are positive, with an average rating of 7/10. The website's consensus reads: "A sweeping yet intimate historical epic, Palestine '36 demands careful attention to its intricately woven storytelling, rewarding viewers with a humanist, clear-eyed act of remembrance." On Metacritic, which uses a weighted average, the film holds a score of 67/100 based on 11 critics, indicating "generally favorable" reviews.

Peter Bradshaw of The Guardian gave the film 3 stars describing it as an "emotionally stirring drama [which] follows a year of brutal conflict in the Middle East with a huge cast of characters caught up in the turmoil". Bradshaw further wrote: "This is a heartfelt film, if rather stolidly paced and sometimes pedagogically conveyed. The cast includes such Palestinian heavyweight actors as Hiam Abbass and Saleh Bakri as passionate rebels. Jeremy Irons plays the high commissioner Sir Arthur Wauchope who presides with bland complacency over this troublesome possession. The other colonials are divided, in the traditional style, into “good British” – Billy Howle as a troubled and ineffectually pro-Arab civil servant – and “bad British” – Robert Aramayo as the brutal Captain Orde Wingate, who here personifies the arrogance and cruelty of the coloniser, shooting civilians in cold blood and ordering the collective punishment of entire villages".

Variety said, "'Prescient' is perhaps the most appropriate word to describe Palestine 36" and "The performances are uniformly excellent and in tandem with each other — true ensemble work where each actor complements his screen partners. The one missed note is Robert Aramayo as the villainous British military captain, who’s missing only a twirling mustache in how caricatured the character is written and performed."

The Financial Times described it as "a rousing historical epic that chronicles the failed birth of a nation, and the brutal quelling of rebels seeking to resist Arab displacement precipitated by swiftly rising Jewish migration", and quoted Jacir as saying: “It’s the Palestinian point of view of that period”. The New Arab described it as "an epic historical drama that serves as a timely antidote to the 1960 film Exodus". Sheri Linden from The Hollywood Reporter praised the film for offering more "facets and nuances" than Exodus, which she described as "Hollywood's star-studded paean to Zionism". The Irish Times praised it as a "handsome, old-fashioned production" for validating the "worst suspicions" of British colonial rule in Palestine.

In The Free Press, Oren Kessler criticised what he said was the film's ahistorical treatment, writing that it framed the revolt as a "morality play of colonial cruelty and Arab resistance", while reducing the Jews in Mandatory Palestine, which he described as the revolt's main targets, to largely voiceless, caricatured figures and "silent beneficiaries" of British imperialism. Robert Cherry of The Times of Israel wrote that the film overlooks the revolt's continuation of a decade of violence against Jewish communities and omitted any mention of its leader, the Grand Mufti Amin al-Husseini. Cherry wrote that the film's positive reception was due to the reviewers' acceptance of Palestine 36's historical framing, which he stated aligned with anti-Zionist narratives while stressing Arab unity and British backing of Jewish militias. He concluded that the film was endorsed as a political statement despite what he described as its historical inaccuracies.

=== Accolades ===
Accolades received by Palestine 36
Award	Date of Ceremony	Category	Recipient(s)	Result	Ref.
São Paulo International Film Festival	30 October 2025	Audience Award - Best International Fiction		Won	
Tokyo International Film Festival	5 November 2025	Tokyo Grand Prix / The Governor of Tokyo Award		Won	
Asian World Film Festival	20 November 2025	Snow Leopard Competition: Special Jury Prize		Won	
Asia Pacific Screen Awards	27 November 2025	Best Screenplay	Annemarie Jacir	Nominated	
Mosaic International South Asian Film Festival	29 November 2025	Best Production Design	Nael Kanj	Won	
Girls on Film Awards	2 February 2026	Best Cinematography Award	Sarah Blum AFC and Hélène Louvart AFC (with Tim Fleming ISC and Leandro Monti)	Nominated	
London Critics Circle Film Awards	2 February 2026	Breakthrough Performer of the Year	Robert Aramayo (I Swear/Palestine 36)	Won	
London Critics Circle Film Awards	2 February 2026	British/Irish Performer of the Year	Robert Aramayo (I Swear/Palestine 36)	Nominated	
IFTA Awards	20 February 2026	Supporting Actor - Film	Liam Cunningham	Nominated	
IFTA Awards	20 February 2026	International Film		Nominated	

== See also ==
- List of submissions to the 98th Academy Awards for Best International Feature Film
- List of Palestinian submissions for the Academy Award for Best International Feature Film
