= The Attack (2012 film) =

- Directed by: Ziad Doueiri
- Written by: Joelle Touma; Ziad Doueiri
- Based on: The Attack; 2005 novel by Yasmina Khadra
- Produced by: Rachid Bouchareb; Jean Bréhat
- Starring: Ali Suliman; Reymond Amsalem
- Cinematography: Tommaso Fiorilli
- Edited by: Ziad Doueiri; Dominique Marcombe
- Music by: Éric Neveux
- Release date: 1 September 2012 (TFF)
- Running time: 102 minutes
- Countries: France; Belgium; Qatar; Egypt
- Languages: Arabic; Hebrew

The Attack is a 2012 French/Belgian/Qatari/Egyptian drama film directed by Ziad Doueiri, who is also one of the script writers.

== Synopsis ==
A Palestinian surgeon, who holds Israeli citizenship, is shocked to discover that his wife committed a suicide bombing.

== Cast ==
- Ali Suliman as Amin Jaafari
- Reymond Amsalem as Siham Jaafari
- Evgenia Dodina as Kim
- Dvir Benedek as Raveed
- Uri Gavriel as Captain Moshe
- Ruba Salameh as Faten
- Karim Saleh as Adel
- Nisrin Siksik as Leila
- Bassem Lulu as Yasser
- Ezra Dagan as Ezra Benhaim
- Ramzi Maqdisi as Priest
- Arieh Worthalter as the man

== Reception ==
On the review aggregator website Rotten Tomatoes, 87% of 61 critics' reviews are positive, with an average rating of 7.5/10. The website's consensus reads: "Tense and suspenseful while remaining smart and understated, The Attack honors its complex subject with an intelligent script and captivating performances." Metacritic, which uses a weighted average, assigned the film a score of 74 out of 100, based on 24 critics, indicating "generally favorable" reviews.

The film was banned in Lebanon and 22 other Arab countries. The director, Ziad Doueiri, was briefly detained in 2017 by Lebanese authorities, possibly in relation to this film. Parts of the film were filmed in Israel, using an Israeli actor, and therefore paying taxes to the Israeli government, which drew the ire of Lebanese Boycott, Divestment and Sanctions activists, who said he "violated" their "campaign for justice".
