= What the Day Owes the Night (film) =

2012 French romantic drama film

- Film poster
- French: Ce que le jour doit à la nuit
- Directed by: Alexandre Arcady
- Written by: Alexandre Arcady; Blandine Stintzy; Daniel Saint-Hamont
- Based on: What the Day Owes the Night by Yasmina Khadra
- Produced by: Alexandre Arcady
- Starring: Fu'ad Aït Aattou; Nora Arnezeder
- Cinematography: Gilles Henry
- Edited by: Manuel De Sousa
- Music by: Armand Amar
- Production companies: Alexandre Films; New Light Films; Studio 37; Wild Bunch; France 2 Cinéma; Les Films du Jasmin; Be-Films uFilm
- Distributed by: Wild Bunch
- Release date: 12 September 2012
- Running time: 162 minutes
- Country: France
- Language: French
- Budget: €13.2 million
- Box office: US$2 million

What the Day Owes the Night (French: Ce que le jour doit à la nuit) is a 2012 French romantic drama film based on the novel of the same name by Yasmina Khadra. It was directed and produced by Alexandre Arcady, who also wrote the screenplay with Blandine Stintzy and Daniel Saint-Hamont.

== Plot ==
The film looks over the life of a young man, Younes, from his childhood in Algeria in the 1930s to nowadays. The story goes over the tragedies that occurred in his country like the battle of Mers El-Kebir and the Algerian War but also the love story of Emilie and Younes.

Younes's family owns a wheat field in the countryside next to Oran, expecting an abundant harvest. Unfortunately, the field is set on fire by the Cheikh henchmen, to whom the family owes money. Unable to pay the debt, the family is expropriated by the colonial administration to the benefit of the Cheikh whose first goal was to get the family's land.

Now ruined and without any money, they move to the nearest city, Oran, where Issa, Younes's father, works difficult jobs for a pittance. Physically and psychologically worn, Issa is resigned to give his son away to Mohamed, his elder pharmacist brother, to whom he didn't speak for a long time because Mohamed married a pied-noir piano teacher named Madeleine.

Renamed Jonas by Madeleine, Younes is warmly hosted in his new and only family after the death of his sister and mother during the battle of Mers El-Kebir, and the disappearance of his father, sunk into alcoholism. Madeleine couldn't have children with Mohamed so she considers Younes as her own child, educates him and lets him attend piano lessons. That's how he meets Emilie, a young girl from France whose parents came to live in Algeria and begins a friendship with her.

Spotted because of his political positions, Mohamed is harassed by the French police. To escape from it, Mohamed decides to leave Oran with his family. They settle in a little town called Rio Salado inhabited by a large population of pieds-noirs from Spanish backgrounds for the majority. The family builds a new life and Jonas meets new friends, three children of this community, Jean-Christophe, Fabrice and Simon. Many years passed and nothing changed in Rio Salado until the arrival of Emilie.

== Cast ==
- Fu'ad Aït Aattou as Younès/Jonas
- Nora Arnezeder as Émilie Cazenave
- Anne Parillaud as Madame Cazenave
- Vincent Pérez as Juan Rucillio
- Fellag as Mohamed
- Anne Consigny as Madeleine
- Nicolas Giraud as Fabrice
- Matthias Van Khache as Simon/Adult Michel (Simon's son)
- Olivier Barthélémy as Jean-Christophe
- Matthieu Boujenah as André (Dédé)
- Marine Vacth as Isabelle Rucillio (adult)
- Salim Kechiouche as Djelloul
- Iyad Bouchi as Younes (child)
- Jean-François Poron as Younes (aged 70)
- Tayeb Belmihoub as Issa
