= What the Day Owes the Night =

Novel by Yasmina Khadra

- Author: Yasmina Khadra
- Translator: Frank Wynne
- Language: French
- Publisher: Éditions Julliard
- Publication date: 21 August 2008
- ISBN: 978-2-260-01758-5

What the Day Owes the Night is a 2008 novel by Algerian writer Yasmina Khadra. It was originally written and published in French. The English translation was produced by Frank Wynne, and published by Heinemann in 2010.

== Film adaptation ==
The 2012 film What the Day Owes the Night is based on the novel.

== Awards ==
- Lire magazine - Best book of the year (2008)
