= Saved (2009 film) =

2009 Australian telemovie by Tony Ayres

- Written by: Belinda Chayko
- Directed by: Tony Ayres
- Starring: Claudia Karvan; Osamah Sami
- Music by: Antony Partos
- Country of origin: Australia
- Original language: English

Production
- Producer: Michael McMahon
- Cinematography: Anna Howard
- Editor: Mark Atkin
- Running time: 89 mins
- Production companies: Big & Little Films

Original release
- Network: SBS
- Release: 2009

Saved is a 2009 Australian telemovie starring Claudia Karvan and Osamah Sami. Broadcast on SBS, it was directed by Tony Ayres and produced by Michael McMahon.

== Synopsis ==
Julia Weston (Karvan), a married woman in her thirties, becomes an advocate for Amir Ali, a young Iranian refugee (Sami) in detention and close to deportation. However, the Department of Immigration disputes his identity. Julia gets heavily involved in Amir's case, causing friction with her husband, Peter (Rodoreda). She eventually frees Amir, who then moves in with the couple. As Julia helps Amir adjust to life, an attraction begins to grow. But she also starts to sees inconsistencies in Amir's story, causing her to question his back story.

== Cast ==
- Claudia Karvan as Julia Weston
- Andy Rodoreda as Peter Weston
- Osamah Sami as Amir Farshchi
- Sue Jones as Claire Weston
- Neil Melville as Nigel Weston
- Beverley Dunn as Sister Carmel
- Gareth Yuen as Justin Chan

== Accolades ==
The telemovie was nominated for an Australian Film Institute Award for Best Telefeature, Mini Series or Short Run Series in 2009.

Karvan won a 2010 Logie Award for Most Outstanding Actress for her role in the film.
