= An Orange from Jaffa =

2024 short drama film

- Official poster
- Directed by: Mohammed Almughanni
- Story by: Mohammed Almughanni
- Starring: Samer Bisharat; Kamel El Basha; Nisreen Aljubeh; Ameer Khlawe
- Cinematography: Maciej Edelman
- Edited by: Natalia Jacheć
- Music by: Robert Logan
- Production companies: Gaza Films; Studio Indeks
- Release date: 3 February 2024 (Clermont-Ferrand International Short Film Festival)
- Running time: 27 minutes
- Countries: Palestine; Poland; France
- Languages: Arabic; English; Hebrew

An Orange from Jaffa is a 2024 short film written and directed by Mohammed Almughanni. The Palestinian-Polish-French co-production film is about Mohammed, a young Palestinian who tries to cross an Israeli checkpoint using a temporary Polish residence card. After being turned down by other drivers, Farouk, a well-meaning taxi driver, offers him a ride but he runs into trouble when his previous attempt to enter Israel is discovered.

An Orange from Jaffa, winner of Grand Prix at the 46th Clermont-Ferrand International Short Film Festival, was shortlisted for the Best Live Action Short Film at the 97th Academy Awards in December 2024.

== Synopsis ==
=== Theme ===
The Jaffa orange serves as a symbol of Palestinians' connection to the land. In the film, sharing a Jaffa orange becomes an emotional moment that encapsulates Palestinian longing and loss.

=== Content ===
Mohammed, a young Palestinian student who is trying to get to Jaffa, sets out to cross an Israeli checkpoint using a temporary Polish residence card. He finally gets a ride with a taxi driver named Farouk. However, the checkpoint authorities discover that Mohammed's entry into Israel been denied before, and refuse to let him through. The film vividly portrays the toll of living under occupation.

== Cast ==
- Samer Bisharat as Mohammed
- Kamel El Basha as Farouk
- Nisreen Aljubeh as mother (background voice)
- Ameer Khlawe as Assaf
- Diaa Mughrabi as Ofer
- Khaled Mayer as Etay
- Razan Abo Odeh as soldier
- Mahmoud Hussein as soldier
- Nasser Bader as taxi driver
- Jihad Shomali as taxi driver
- Saud Rishmawi as settler
- Alaa Khanjar as settler
- William Abdullah as driver
- Murad Al Jubeh as driver
- Odeh Tantar as driver
- Faeq Deck as driver

== Production ==
The film is directed by Mohammed Almughanni and produced by Gaza Films, and Studio Indeks. It received financial support from Synecdoche, Lumisenta Film Foundation, the War on Screen program, CNC. The short film was sold to Arte television. The filming was wrapped up on 27 June 2022.

== Release ==
An Orange from Jaffa had its premiere at War on Screen on 7 October 2023.

In february 2024, it competed in the 46th Clermont-Ferrand International Short Film Festival and won the International Grand Prix.

In May 2024 it competed in International Short Film Competition at the 64th Kraków Film Festival.

In May 2024, It also competed in the International Short Film Festival Oberhausen.

On 3 July 2024, it was screened at the Freedom Film Festival, and on 21 July at the New Horizons Film Festival, Wrocław, Poland. In September 2024, it competed in the Polish Film Festival. In November 2024, it competed at the Leeds International Film Festival, where it won the Louis le Prince International Short Film Competition.

== Accolades ==
| Award | Date of ceremony | Category | Recipient(s) | Result | Ref. |
|---|---|---|---|---|---|
| Clermont-Ferrand International Short Film Festival | 13 February 2024 | Grand Prix | Mohammed Almughanni | Won | |
| El Gouna Film Festival | October 2024 | Silver Star Award | Mohammed Almughanni | Won | |
| Kraków Film Festival | 2 June 2024 | Best European Short Film | Mohammed Almughanni | Won | |
| Le Cri du Court Festival | 19 May 2024 | Audience Award | An Orange from Jaffa/Mohammed Almughanni | Won | |
| Le Cri du Court Festival | 19 May 2024 | Best Actor Award | Kamel El Basha | Won | |
| Polish Film Festival | 28 September 2024 | Lucjan Bokiniec Award for Best Short Film | Mohammed Almughanni | Won | |
| Leeds International Film Festival | 17 November 2024 | Louis Le Prince Award | An Orange from Jaffa/Mohammed Almughanni | Won | |
| Corto Dorico Film Festival | 9 December 2024 | Amnesty International Award | An Orange from Jaffa/Mohammed Almughanni | Won | |
| Cairo International Short Film Festival | 24 December 2024 | Golden Tower Award for best film of International Competition | An Orange from Jaffa/Mohammed Almughanni | Won | |

== See also ==
- Academy Award for Best Live Action Short Film
- 97th Academy Awards
