= Blind Flight =

- Theatrical release poster
- Directed by: John Furse
- Written by: John Furse
- Produced by: Sally Hibbin
- Starring: Linus Roache; Ian Hart; Nayef Rashed
- Cinematography: Ian Wilson
- Edited by: Kristina Hetherington
- Music by: Stephen McKeon
- Release dates: October 2003 (London Film Festival); 9 April 2004 (United Kingdom)
- Running time: 97 minutes
- Country: United Kingdom
- Language: English

Blind Flight is a 2003 British prison film directed by John Furse and starring Ian Hart and Linus Roache. It is based on the true-life story of the kidnapping and imprisonment of the Irish academic Brian Keenan and the English journalist John McCarthy, two of the hostages in the Lebanon hostage crisis. The film is based on Keenan's memoir, An Evil Cradling and Some Other Rainbow by John McCarthy who was a screenplay consultant. The film received widespread critical acclaim, being nominated for six awards, and winning a BAFTA.

== Plot ==
Brian Keenan, a humourless bearded Irish academic, has moved to Beirut in the mid 1980s and works as an English teacher. As he leaves for work one day, four armed men in a car kidnap him and he is incarcerated. Keenan wakes up, almost naked, alone in an iron-clad room. Initially he refuses to eat until he is told why he is being held prisoner. He is kept on his own but eventually he is moved into a cell in a deserted house, where he is joined by another hostage, the English journalist John McCarthy, who had been reporting on Keenan’s kidnapping not long before he himself was abducted. The grumpy Brit-hating Irishman and the more pliable British journalist are forced to share their small prison cell.

Keenan refuses to be shaved or wear clean clothes until he gets answers from his captors. He protests about having his beard shaved off. A grumpy idealist, Keenan sees his treatment by his Muslim jailers as equaling the British historic treatment of Ireland. McCarthy is neutral and pragmatic. The two men are periodically moved around to new hiding places. The pair slowly begin to bond as they make a temporary life together, playing chess, catching mosquitoes, trapping a mouse, telling stories and imagining they are somewhere else. They become very close friends and when one man is in trouble or close to the breaking point, the other invariably helps him.

Their guards treat them with a mixture of detachment, kindness and cruelty. After another move, to a small, white-tiled cell, McCarthy is traumatized after being shown a video of his mother pleading for his return. He finds strength in Keenan's own brand of self-control.

The two men are smuggled to a house in the countryside. Keenan attacks a young guard who is trying to humiliate him by making him open and close a window repeatedly. He is beaten. McCarthy intercedes with the leader of the captors saying this should not have been allowed to happen. He too is beaten. Eventually in 1990 after more than four years of imprisonment, Keenan is released. He is reluctant to accept his freedom if it means leaving McCarthy behind. Back in Ireland a year later, Keenan receives a call in a pub: McCarthy is to be released. He is waiting at the airport for McCarthy to arrive home.

== Cast ==
- Ian Hart as Brian Keenan
- Linus Roache as John McCarthy
- Mohamad Chamas as Abed
- Nayef Rashed as Militia leader
- Lynn Farleigh as John's Mother
- Aine Ni Mhuiri as Brian's Mother
- Paddy Rocks as Brian's father
- Stephen Don as RUC Officer
- Ziad Lahoud as Said

== Home media ==
Blind Flight is available in Region 2 DVD. It has not been released on DVD in the United States.
