= House of Gods =

Australian television series

- Created by: Osamah Sami; Shahin Shafaei
- Written by: Osamah Sami; Shahin Shafaei; Blake Ayshford; Sarah Bassiuoni
- Directed by: Fadia Abboud
- Starring: Kamel El Basha; Osamah Sami; Maia Abbas
- Country of origin: Australia
- Original language: English/Arabic
- No. of series: 1
- No. of episodes: 6

Production
- Executive producers: Debbie Lee; Sally Riley; Sheila Jayaved; Blake Ayshford; Brett Sleigh
- Producer: Bree-Anne Sykes
- Cinematography: Sky Davies
- Editor: Nicholas Holmes
- Running time: 55 minutes
- Production company: Matchbox Pictures

Original release
- Network: ABC TV
- Release: 25 February – 31 March 2024

House of Gods is a 2024 Australian television drama series. It is created by Osamah Sami and Shahin Shafaei and produced by Matchbox Pictures. It was broadcast on ABC TV from 25 February until 31 March 2024.

== Premise ==
In the Sydney suburb of Fairfield, Sheikh Mohammad is bidding for the head cleric position at his Iraqi Shia mosque. However, whilst his progressive positions are backed by his children they bring tension to aspects of the more conservative community.

== Cast ==
- Kamel El Basha as Sheikh Mohammad
- Osamah Sami as Isa
- Maia Abas as Batul
- Majid Shokor as Uncle Samir
- Safia Arain as Hind
- Simon Elrah as Sheikh Shaaker
- Priscilla Doueihy as Jamila
- Ali Ibrahim as Yusuf
- Azmi Al-Hasani as Aqil
- Saif Alawadi as Bilal
- Wadih Dona as Abu Hany
- Antoinette Lattouf as Leyla

== Production ==
The 55 minute six-part drama series was created by Osamah Sami (whose father was head cleric of a mosque in Melbourne) and Shahin Shafaei. It is co-written by Blake Ayshford and Sarah Bassiuoni. Sami first presented the idea to the Matchbox Pictures producer Sheila Jayadev 5–6 years prior to production.

House of Gods is directed by Fadia Abboud and executive producers are Debbie Lee, Sally Riley, Jayaved, Blake Ayshford, and Brett Sleigh. Bree-Anne Sykes is series producer.

The series has an entirely Arab Australian cast, which includes Kamel El Basha, Osamah Sami, Maia Abas, Majid Shokor, Safia Arain, Simon Elrah, Priscilla Doueihy, Ali Ibrahim, Azmi Al-Hasani, Saif Alawadi, Wadih Dona, and Antoinette Lattouf.

== Episodes ==
The series was shown in Australia on ABC TV from 25 February 2024, until 31 March 2024. All episodes of the series were added to ABC iview on 25 February 2024.

No.	Plot	Directed by	Written by	Release Date
1	Dining with the wolves The series opens with Sheikh Mohammad, a charismatic Iraqi-Australian cleric, being elected Head Cleric of The Messenger mosque in western Sydney, a milestone that brings newfound power and attention to his family. As he steps into his new role, the community’s reactions — both supportive and critical — begin to surface. The family celebrates the victory, but this new influence quickly brings pressure and scrutiny.	Fadia Abboud	Osamah Sami	25 February 2024
2	Family Blood With leadership secured, tensions within the family come to the forefront. Isa, Sheikh Mohammad’s adopted son, struggles to meet a financial commitment to a figure named Seyyed Modhaffar, revealing a web of obligations that complicates his father’s success. Meanwhile, Batul, the sheikh’s daughter, emerges as a strategic—and increasingly ruthless—force, positioning herself as a key player in both family and mosque politics.	Fadia Abboud	Sarah Bassiuoni	25 February 2024
3	Ramadan Sin As Ramadan begins, the mosque receives a surge of donation income that temporarily eases Isa’s financial woes. But beyond the money, Sheikh Mohammad attempts to implement his vision for a new school, only to encounter resistance from the mosque’s committee. This clash highlights the broader ideological tensions between modernising aspirations and entrenched traditional views in the community.	Fadia Abboud	Osamah Sami	25 February 2024
4	He in whose hands is dominion Batul’s political manoeuvring is disrupted when she confronts the possibility of motherhood, forcing her to balance personal desires with leadership ambitions. At the same time, Isa discovers something of value—an asset he hopes to use as collateral with Seyyed Modhaffar. These developments deepen the moral and emotional stakes for the family as they juggle loyalty, legacy and survival.	Fadia Abboud	Sarah Bassiuoni	25 February 2024
5	Lament The stakes grow higher as Seyyed Modhaffar concocts a risky plan to transport Isa’s required funds to Iraq. The urgency and danger of the mission start to attract suspicion, putting Isa and his associates at risk of discovery. This episode focuses on the consequences of secret deals and the reckoning that comes with compromising ethical boundaries.	Fadia Abboud	Blake Ayshford	25 February 2024
6	When God speaks In the finale, Sheikh Shaaker, a rival cleric, becomes suspicious of Isa’s dealings and pursues evidence of fraud or misconduct. As pressure mounts from both within and outside the mosque, Sheikh Mohammad demonstrates just how far he is willing to go to retain power and protect his family’s position. The episode culminates in a tense blending of spiritual authority, community politics and hard choices that define the series’ central conflicts.	Fadia Abboud	Osamah Sami & Shahin Shafaei	25 February 2024

== Reception ==
=== Awards ===
Kamel El Basha won the best actor prize at the 14th edition of Series Mania in France in March 2024.

=== Critical reception ===
Mostafa Rachwani of Guardian Australia gave the drama series a 2 star rating, writing "I think it is important to acknowledge House of Gods as an overall step forward for Muslim representation in Australia." Mel Campbell of ScreenHub gave the drama series a 3½ star rating, writing "Like the sheikh, House of Gods is working hard to find its place and move with its times. And it’s a very absorbing balancing act to watch".
