= The Swallows of Kabul =

2002 novel by Yasmina Khadra

- Author: Yasmina Khadra
- Original title: Les Hirondelles de Kaboul
- Language: French
- Genre: Historical fiction
- Publication date: 2002
- Publication place: France

The Swallows of Kabul (French: Les Hirondelles de Kaboul) is a 2002 novel by Algerian writer Yasmina Khadra. It was originally written and published in French. The novel delves into the lives of two couples in war-torn Afghanistan. It portrays themes of love, sacrifice, and the human spirit amidst the brutality of the Taliban regime.

== Plot ==
Chapter 1

You meet Atiq Shaukat, a jailer for the Taliban. His wife, Musarrat, is very ill and dying. He is late for work and blames it on his wife's illness. He escorts a prostitute to be stoned to death. You meet Mohsen Ramat. He's against the new Taliban rule. He is at the marketplace when he sees the prostitute being stoned to death at a public execution. Even though he thinks it is wrong, he loses himself, picks up a rock and throws it at her, cracking her head open.

Chapter 2

Atiq is starting to question his belief in the Taliban. You meet his childhood friend Mirza Shah. Mirza was one of the first soldiers to desert his unit and join the Mujahideen during the war. Now Mirza does cocaine for money. Atiq tells Mirza about his troubles and his concern for his ill wife. Mirza says he should divorce her and throw her out, that it is “God's will”, and that women have no feelings. Atiq feels indebted to his wife because she saved his life.

Chapter 3

Mohsen Ramat goes home, and you meet his wife Zunaira, a beautiful woman who used to be a schoolteacher. They have a small house with a blanket over the windows because they cannot afford to fix them. The windows must be covered because it would offend a man if he walked by and saw Zunaira. Mohsen tells his wife what happened at the marketplace, and she is horrified.

Chapter 4

Atiq is patrolling a sanctuary, seizing men and forcing them to join the assembled faithful. During Maghreb prayer, Atiq is mad at himself for thinking angry thoughts about the poor and elderly. After the prayer, he doesn't want to go home to his wife so he stops to listen to some old war veterans. Goliath tells a story about being ambushed, having to lie surrounded by smelly corpses. This causes an uproar because the mujahideen's "dead do not stink"; it must have been the Shuravi (the opposing side during the war). Atiq finally goes home and is surprised to find his wife Musarrat out of bed. She has cleaned and cooked for him. They argue and Atiq gets angry and leaves. Mohsen's wife is not talking to him so he goes out as well.

Chapter 5

Atiq goes to the jail to sleep there. You meet Nazeesh, who comes into the jail to comfort the jailer, as he has seen the light on. Nazeesh talks about his father being sick and being a burden to him. He says he is going to run away. Atiq insults Nazeesh, telling him he is never going to run away: he always talks about it but never follows through. Nazeesh leaves the jail upset. Atiq thinks to himself that if Ms. Conner does not start acting better, he will stop being kind to her.

Chapter 6

Zunaira is no longer mad at Mohsen. She has realized that he did not mean what he said; he just went crazy for a minute. Mohsen wants them to go for a walk, but Zunaira does not want to because if she goes out she will likely be an object, not even human. She will have to cover her face with a burqa and she will not be allowed to hold Mohsen's hand. And they will be scolded if they talk to each other. But seeing that he is very sad, she agrees to go.

Chapter 7

Atiq finds Nazeesh and apologizes for the previous night; but before leaving he is mean to him again. Atiq is upset at himself for this but notices he is starting to be unintentionally mean to people. He is talking to himself out loud when Mirza yells out to him that he is going insane talking to himself. This upsets Atiq so he rushes off and knocks over Zunaira and Mohsen on the way. Zunaira and Mohsen exchange comments on his rudeness, then start to laugh. A different guard comes over and hits Mohsen for laughing in public. Zunaira tells Mohsen that they should leave and gets hit for speaking. Another guard comes and asks where they are headed. Mohsen lies and says they are going to visit Zunaira's parents. They tell him that his wife will wait there, and he will attend Mullah Bashir's sermon.

Chapter 8

Mullah Bashir preaches on how the Western world is evil. Meanwhile, Zunaira sits outside in the hot sun for two hours, stewing over her fate as a woman in Taliban society, and coming to terms with the fact that the rights she had in the past have been completely stripped away from the Taliban. After the sermon is over, they walk home together. Zunaira starts to cry.

Chapter 9

Nazeesh actually leaves the village (Kabul). He is passed by a 4x4 military truck. In the car, you meet a man named Qassim. He is on his way to his mother's funeral. He does not know her very well, as he left his village when he was 12 and his mother was both deaf and mute. He is number 6 out of 14 kids. On his way back to Kabul, he stops to eat. He sees Atiq, an old war buddy, and invites him to hang out at Haji Palwan with all of their old war buddies. Atiq just walks away. Musarrat, Atiq's wife, is still very ill and is now losing her hair. She falls asleep on the floor.

Chapter 10

Zunaira and Mohsen are not on speaking terms. She refuses to remove her veil. They start to fight. She says that she never wants to see him again. He tells her that he loves her and that she is the only reason he lives. She still tells him to go away. He demands that she takes off her veil. He tries to force it off. She bites and scratches him, and he slaps her. Realizing what he has done, he tries to apologize, but she pushes him away. He trips on a carafe, hits his head on the wall and breaks his neck.

Chapter 11

Atiq is sitting waiting for a new order. He is with an old war buddy. He asks him about Qaab and an old friend. The buddy asks if he is feeling OK because Qaab is dead and has been dead for two years. He went to the funeral with everybody. Atiq still cannot remember and asked how he died. The buddy tells him that there is something wrong with Atiq and walks away. Later Qassim comes with a woman prisoner and tries his best to cheer Atiq up. Zunaira is in jail for killing her husband and Atiq is the jailer. She and many others are to be executed on Friday at a big rally.

Chapter 12

Zunaira removes her burqa exposing herself to Atiq. Atiq thinks she is the most beautiful thing he has ever seen. He tells his wife Musarrat how beautiful she is. Oddly enough, this makes his wife happy for he is finally able to express his feelings and this make her happy.

Chapter 13

Atiq doesn't want Zunaira to die. He pleads her case to Qassim but he tells her that she is tricking him and even if she were innocent there are no women on the execution line for the big rally and to remember that she is just a woman. Atiq returns to the jail, unlocks it and tells her to escape. She refuses as she has no family to go to. She says she died a long time ago.

Chapter 14

Atiq doesn't know what to do with himself. He loves Zunaira but she refuses to run away. If he runs away with her, they will be caught for sure. His wife sees that he is in love and tell him to go to Zunaira and escape. He leaves for the jail, starts to pray and falls asleep. Musarrat comes in and wakes him up. She tells him that she is going to take Zunaira's place and die instead of her because she is so happy to see him with this much emotion and she will die within a few weeks anyway. He asks her not to do it, but she keeps trying to convince him.

Chapter 15

His wife makes the switch with Zunaira but Atiq does not tell Zunaira about the plan. When Qassim comes, he takes Musarrat and tells Atiq that he has to come to the rally too, and bring along his wife, who is in the jail office. He agrees and tells Zunaira (dressed as Musarrat) to wait at the rally until it is over. Musarrat is shot. After the rally, Atiq cannot find Zunaira. He searches for her everywhere, calling out her name. When that does not work, he starts to think that every girl is Zunaira and he just wants to see her pretty face. So he corners women and takes their burqa off. Some guys pick him up and hit him in the head and crack it open. As he gets back up, he hears people calling him a monster and that he should be hanged or shot. He still continues to look for Zunaira until everything falls dark and silent.
