= Love, Theft and Other Entanglements =

2015 film

- Film poster
- Directed by: Muayad Alayan
- Written by: Muayad Alayan; Rami Musa Alayan
- Starring: Sami Metwasi
- Release date: 6 February 2015 (Berlin)
- Running time: 90 minutes
- Country: Palestine
- Language: Arabic

Love, Theft and Other Entanglements (Arabic: الحب والسرقة ومشاكل أخرى, romanized: Al-Hob wa Al-Sariqa wa Mashakel Ukhra) is a 2015 Palestinian drama film directed by Muayad Alayan, written by Muayad Alayan and Rami Alayan. It was screened in the Panorama section of the 65th Berlin International Film Festival.

== Plot ==
The story revolves around a young Palestinian man named Mousa living in a refugee camp in the west bank, working with his father in construction in the occupied territories.

He steals an Israeli car and goes to sell it in the camp, in hopes to make money to pay a bribe to get an exit visa out of Palestine. his plans change when he finds a kidnapped Israeli soldier hidden in the trunk, and now finds himself on the run from the Israeli intelligence and Palestinian resistance fighter who had kidnapped the soldier to use in a prisoner exchange deal.

== Production ==
The film was produced by Muayad Alayan, who was also the writer, director, and cinematographer. Nathan Daems was the composer and Sameer Qumsiyeh was the sound designer and editor.

The film is shot entirely in black and white.

== Cast ==
- Sami Metwasi - Mousa
- Maya Abu Alhayyat - Manal
- Riyad Sliman - Avi
- Ramzi Maqdisi - Kamal
- Kamel El Basha - Abu Mustafa

== See also ==
- List of Palestinian films
