= David Herman (disambiguation) =

David Herman (born 1967) is an American actor, comedian and voice actor.

David Herman or Dave Herman may also refer to:

- Dave Herman (American football) (1941–2022)
- David Herman (BMX rider) (born 1988), American racing cyclist
- Dave Herman (fighter) (born 1984), American mixed martial artist
- Dave Herman (DJ) (1936–2014), American disc jockey
