= Osamah Sami =

Australian actor, writer, and comedian

- أسامة سامي
- Born: Qom, Iran
- Education: Kanoon Pavaresh Fekri; The Australian Film and Television Academy
- Occupations: Actor, writer, comedian
- Notable work: Good Muslim Boy (book); Ali's Wedding (film)
- Awards: AACTA Award; Film Critics Circle of Australia Award; Australian Muslim Achievement Award; Sydney Indie Film Festival Award; NSW Premier's Literary Award. Australian Writers' Guild Award; Los Angeles Independent Film Festival Award

Osamah Sami is an Australian stage and screen actor, writer, and stand-up comedian, born in Iran of Iraqi origin. He is known for his award-winning book Good Muslim Boy, and for his role as the titular character in 2017 film Ali's Wedding.

== Early life and education ==
Osamah Sami was born in Qom, Iran. His father, Dr Jaafar al-Bakiry, a Shiite cleric from Iraq, had been a political prisoner under Saddam Hussein and met his Kurdish wife, Sami's mother, in an Iranian refugee camp. His father had evaded execution for protesting against Hussein, by escaping prison and swimming over the border to Iran.

Sami was cast in several roles on stage in his hometown as a child. Then as a teenager, he studied arts at Kanoon Pavaresh Fekri, Iran's leading arts development institute, before appearing in two Iranian feature films.

When Sami was twelve, the family then emigrated to Melbourne, Australia in 1995, settling in the suburb of Fawkner. Sami was the oldest of seven children.

Sami's father had hoped his son would become a doctor, but his grades didn't get him into medicine. So he pretended to get a perfect score in year 12 and lied about winning a place in medicine at the University of Melbourne. He attended classes for a year, without being detected by his parents or the school. His father eventually took him on a pilgrimage back to Iran to try and straighten him out.

While 'attending' university, Sami also met and fell in love with a legitimate medical student, which also proved problematic, as his family was in the process of organising his arranged marriage. Sami held several jobs including working as a waiter, forklift driver and librarian but ultimately decided acting was the only thing he wanted to do. He went on to further his earlier acting studies at The Australian Film and Television Academy (TAFTA).

== Career ==
After immigrating to Australia, Sami began working with a local theatre group and starred in their productions. His father wrote a musical-comedy called Trial of Saddam, in which Sami played the role of Saddam Hussein. After proving a hit amongst the Iraqi community in Australia, it was subsequently due to play sold-out shows in Detroit in the US in 2005. But, as this was shortly after the London and Madrid train bombings, the theatre group was prevented from entering the United States to perform the play.

In addition to theatre, Sami also went on to work in film and television. In 2007, he had a regular role as Sharif Doumani in 13-part SBS romantic drama series Kick, and in the late 2000s he made guest appearances in largely typecast roles in series including City Homicide, Rush, Sea Patrol and East West 101 before landing his breakthrough role opposite Claudia Karvan in the telemovie Saved, directed by Tony Ayres.

Sami co-created the 2015 comedy web series, Two Refugees and a Blonde, together with Shahin Shafaei and Rain Fuller. He also played one of the three lead roles. Sami stated: "This series aims to remove the sombre stigma synonymous with refugees and to replace it with a dose of laughter...". It launched during Refugee Week in Melbourne and was screened at Amnesty Refugee Network's Festival of Hope on World Refugee Day, while premiering online via YouTube.

Sami's critically acclaimed memoir Good Muslim Boy was published by Hardie Grant in 2015. In 2016, it became the winner of the New South Wales Premier's Literary Award, and was commended at the Victorian Premier's Literary Awards. He also adapted his book for the stage, with productions by Melbourne's Malthouse Theatre and Queensland Theatre.

Sami was nominated for a 2016 Green Room Award for Best Male Performer in a Lead Role for a Melbourne Theatre Company production of I Call My Brothers. He also played the lead role of American-born Palestinian doctor, Rami, in a production of Tales of a City by the Sea in Sydney and Melbourne.

Sami co-wrote and starred as the titular character in 2016 feature romantic comedy film Ali's Wedding, which was also based on his memoir. The film was acquired by Netflix. His work earned him a 2017 Australian Academy Award (AACTA Award) for Best Original Screenplay as well as a nomination for Best Lead Actor. It was also nominated for Best Film. This was mirrored at the 2017 Film Critics Circle of Australia Awards, where it won Best Film, and earned Sami a win for Best Screenplay and a nomination for Best Male Lead. His script also received a 2016 Australian Writers' Guild Award in the Best Original Feature Film category. Further wins included Audience Award for Best Feature Film at the 2017 Sydney Film Festival and The Age Critics Prize at Melbourne International Film Festival. The film was also awarded the $100,000 CinefestOz film prize in 2017.

Sami appeared in the 2020 historical drama film The Furnace, opposite David Wenham. The film premiered at the 2020 Venice Film Festival drawing positive international reviews. In 2022, he played the role of Salim Bayati in six-part mystery drama miniseries Savage River, alongside Katherine Langford, Jacqueline McKenzie and Nadine Garner.

Sami next starred opposite Zar Amir Ebrahimi in the Shayda. The film was the winner of the Audience Award for Best Film after premiering as the 2023 opening night film at Sundance. It was also selected as the opening night film at Melbourne International Film Festival, and went on to win the 2023 CinefestOz $100,000 film prize. That same year, Sami was a co-writer on psychological thriller series The Clearing, which featured an all-star cast including Teresa Palmer, Miranda Otto, Guy Pearce, Xavier Samuel, Claudia Karvan and Gary Sweet. Also in 2023, Sami co-wrote and starred in drama film Tennessine, which screened at both CinefestOZ and the Sydney Film Festival.

Sami then co-created, co-wrote and appeared in the 2024 television drama miniseries called House of Gods, which aired on ABC TV and ABC iview from 25 February 2024. The drama centres around an imam and his family as well as the Australian Arab / Iraqi community he leads, with Sami using his own real-life experiences to tell the story of the community of which he is a part.

Sami is also a stand-up comedian, and writes a poetry blog, with themes ranging from love and family to social justice and war.

== Personal life ==
Sami is father to two daughters. He speaks Arabic, Farsi and English.

Sami's father died at the age of 50, while the pair were on holidays overseas in Tehran.

== Awards and nominations ==
Year	Work	Award	Category	Result	Ref.
2016	Good Muslim Boy	New South Wales Premier's Literary Award	Non-Fiction Writing	Won	
2016	Good Muslim Boy	Victorian Premier's Literary Award	Non-Fiction Writing	Highly Commended	
2016	I Call My Brothers	Green Room Award	Best Male Actor (Theatre Companies)	Nominated	
2016	Two Refugees and a Blonde	LA Webfest	Outstanding Comedy Series	Nominated	
2016	Two Refugees and a Blonde	LA Webfest	Outstanding Ensemble Cast	Nominated	
2016	Ali's Wedding	Australian Writers' Guild Award	Best Original Feature Film	Won	
2017	Ali's Wedding	AACTA Award	Best Lead Actor in a Feature Film	Nominated	
2017	Ali's Wedding	AACTA Award	Best Original Screenplay	Won	
2017	Ali's Wedding	Film Critics Circle of Australia Award	Best Screenplay	Won	
2017	Ali's Wedding	Film Critics Circle of Australia Award	Best Male Lead	Nominated	
2017	Osamah Sami	Australian Muslim Achievement Award	Creative Artist of the Year	Won	
2017	Two Refugees and a Blonde	Los Angeles Independent Film Festival Award	Best Web Series	Won	
2017	Flow	Sydney Indie Film Festival	Best Actor	Won	
2018	Ali's Wedding	Australian Film Critics Association	Best Screenplay	Nominated	
2018	Ali's Wedding	Australian Film Critics Association	Best Actor	Nominated	
2019	Sheltered	AACTA Award	Best Social Short	Runner-up	
2024	Shayda	AACTA Award	Best Lead Actor in a Feature Film	Nominated	
2025	Osamah Sami	Australian Muslim Achievement Award	Creative Artist of the Year	Nominated	

== Acting credits ==
=== Film ===
Year	Title	Role	Notes	Ref.
1993	Chakmeh (aka The Boot)	Town boy		
1993	Abadani-Ha (aka The Abadanis)	Bacheh Abadani		
1997	Mojezeye khandeh (aka The Miracle of Smile)	Hamid		
2007	Lucky Miles	Fiark		
2007	Shotgun! [an Opening Sequence]	Hani	Short film	
2008	296 Smith Street	Anthony	Short film	
2009	Housemates	Aashiq	Short film	
2011	The Orchard	Hadi	Short film	
2012	10 Terrorists	Azim		
2013	Pure	Fady	Short film	
2014	Canberra Says No	Abbas Salim	Short film	
2015	Too Late	Joe Late	Short film	
2016	Journey			
2017	Ali's Wedding	Ali		
2017	Flow	Stephen	Short film	
2020	The Furnace	Majid		
2023	Shayda	Hossein		
2023	Tennessine	Arash		
TBA	Curls	Eddy	In production	
TBA	Life's Discourse	James	Short film Pre-production	

=== Television ===
Year	Title	Role	Notes	Ref.
2007	Kick	Sharif Doumani	Miniseries, 13 episodes	
2007; 2011	City Homicide	Hanif Durrani / Kasim Al-Basri	2 episodes	
2008	Canal Road	Michael Young	Miniseries, 1 episode	
2009	Saved	Amir Ali	TV movie	
2009	East West 101	Latif Kazi	2 episodes	
2010	Rush	Hazrat	1 episode	
2011	Sea Patrol	Salim Shokor	1 episode	
2015	Two Refugees and a Blonde	Sami	Web miniseries, 10 episodes	
2016	Jack Irish	Hadji Adhib	2 episodes	
2016	Journey	Nadim	TV movie	
2020	AussieWood	Sami Sami		
2022	Savage River	Salim Bayati	Miniseries, 6 episodes	
2024	House of Gods	Isa	6 episodes	
TBA	Separated at Birth	Asad	6 episodes In production	

=== Stage ===
Year	Title	Role	Venue / Co.	Ref.
2006	Trial of Saddam	Saddam Hussein	Bankstown Theatre, Sydney	
2007	Homebody / Kabul	Taliban official	Trades Hall, Melbourne with Theatre@Risk	
2007	Sinners	Various characters / Sheep	Carlton Courthouse, Melbourne with La Mama	
2009	Baghdad Wedding		Belvoir St Theatre, Sydney with Company B	
2010	The Long Day's Dying		Carlton Courthouse, Melbourne with La Mama	
2012	Origin-Transit-Destination		Casula Powerhouse, Sydney with Australian Performance Exchange	
2013	The Two Executioners	Maurice	La Mama, Melbourne	
2014; 2016	Tales of a City by the Sea	Rami	La Mama, Melbourne, Bakehouse Theatre, Adelaide	
2015	I Call My Brothers	Amor	VIC/TAS tour with MTC	
2017	The Sound of Waiting	Hamed Mokri	Brown's Mart Theatre, Darwin with Knock 'em Down Theatre	
2018	Good Muslim Boy	Osamah	Malthouse Theatre, Melbourne / Cremorne Theatre, Brisbane with QTC	
2019–2020	Anthem	Malik	Australian tour with Performing Lines	
2021	Them	Omar	Arts Centre Melbourne (show cancelled)	

== Writing credits ==
Year	Title	Role	Notes	Ref.
2009	Housemates	Storyline consultant	Short film	
2012	10 Terrorists	Contributing writer	Feature film	
2014	Canberra Says No	Story/writer / Associate producer	Short film	
2015	Too Late	Writer	Short film	
2015	Two Refugees and a Blonde	Concept / creator	Web miniseries, 10 episodes	
2016	Ali's Wedding	Writer / Associate producer	Feature film	
2017	Sheltered	Co-writer / Script editor	Short film	
2018	Good Muslim Boy	Writer / Adaptor	Stage	
2023	The Clearing	Co-writer	TV series	
2023	Tennessine	Writer	Feature film	
2024	House of Gods	Co-writer	Miniseries	
TBA	When the Birds Aren't Free to Be Buried	Writer / Director	Animation (in development)	

== Books ==
- Sami, Osamah (2015). Good Muslim Boy. Hardie Grant Books. ISBN 978-1-74358-321-0.
