= West Beirut (film) =

- Theatrical release poster
- Directed by: Ziad Doueiri
- Written by: Ziad Doueiri
- Starring: Rami Doueiri; Mohamad Chamas; Rola Al Amin
- Cinematography: Ricardo Jacques Gale
- Edited by: Dominique Marcombe
- Music by: Stewart Copeland
- Release date: 1998
- Running time: 105 minutes
- Country: Lebanon
- Languages: Arabic; French
- Budget: $800,000 (estimated)

West Beirut (French: West Beyrouth (À l'abri les enfants); Arabic: بيروت الغربية (Bayrut El Gharbiyyeh)) is a 1998 Lebanese war comedy-drama film about the Lebanese Civil War, written and directed by Ziad Doueiri. The film was selected as the Lebanese entry for the Best Foreign Language Film at the 71st Academy Awards, but was not accepted as a nominee.

== Plot ==
In April 1975, a young Lebanese boy named Tarek witnesses a massacre of Palestinians by the Phalangists. Shortly thereafter, the Lebanese Civil War breaks out; Beirut is partitioned along a line separating the Muslim–Christian mixed West Beirut from the quasi-Christian East Beirut. After the line was created, Tarek is now considered to live in West Beirut, as he is Muslim himself and is in high school, making Super 8 movies with his friend, Omar.

At first, the war is a lark: Tarek's school, situated in East Beirut, has closed and is no longer accessible to West Beirut residents, getting from West to East is nearly impossible. His mother wants to leave the country, but his father refuses. Tarek spends time with May, an orphaned Christian girl living in his building. By accident, Tarek goes to an infamous brothel in the war-torn Zeytouni Quarter, meeting its legendary madam, Oum Walid. He then takes Omar and May there. Family tensions rise. Later on as he comes of age, the war moves inexorably from adventure to a nationwide tragedy. A compilation of films and images from the war plays, showing Yasser Arafat, the Israeli invasion, Hafez al-Assad, and the American intervention. The film ends with Tarek breaking down crying while listening to his father play the oud, and remembering the good times he had before the war.

== Cast ==
- Rami Doueiri as Tarek
- Mohamad Chamas as Omar
- Rola Al-Amin as May
- Carmen Lebbos as Hala, Tarek's mother
- Joseph Bou Nassar as Riad, Tarek's father
- Liliane Nemri as Nahida (a neighbor)
- Leïla Karam as Brothel Madam (Oum Walid)
- Hassan Farhat as Roadblock Militiaman
- Mahmoud Mabsout as Baker
- Fadi Abou Khalil as Bakery Militiaman

== Critical reception ==
The film has received critical acclaim since its release. Rotten Tomatoes gives a score of 94% based on 16 reviews.

Critic Owen Gleiberman of Entertainment Weekly wrote a glowing review of the film stating "The film’s most resonant pleasure is the thrill Doueiri takes in ripping the veil off of contemporary Arab life... ”West Beirut” does meander a bit, yet it has a fractious, clear-eyed fusion of comedy, innocence, romance, and sudden danger."

== Awards ==
- Prix François Chalais at the Directors' fortnight of the Cannes Film Festival (1998)
- FIPRESCI International Critics' Award at the Toronto International Film Festival (1998)
- Best First Film at the Carthage Film Festival (1998)
- Youth Jury Award at the Valladolid International Film Festival (1998)
- SAA Script Award at the Fribourg International Film Festival (1999)

== See also ==
- List of submissions to the 71st Academy Awards for Best Foreign Language Film
- List of Lebanese submissions for the Academy Award for Best Foreign Language Film
