= Ziad Doueiri =

Lebanese film director (born 1963)

- Born: October 7, 1963 (age 63); Beirut, Lebanon
- Occupations: Film director; screenwriter
- Years active: 1990–present

Ziad Doueiri (Arabic: زياد دويري ; born October 7, 1963) is a Lebanese film director. He is known for his award-winning films West Beirut (1998) and The Insult (2017), a film that was nominated at the 90th Academy Awards, representing Lebanon in the Best International Feature Film category.

== Personal life and career ==
2018 VOA interview with Doueiri about The Insult

Ziad Doueiri was born in Beirut on October 7, 1963, and grew up there during the Lebanese Civil War, where he shot his personal films with an 8 mm camera. At the age of 20, he left Lebanon during the civil war to go study in the United States, and graduated in 1986 from San Diego State University with a degree in cinema, then worked with Quentin Tarantino as camera assistant then cinematographer for movies such as Jackie Brown, From Dusk till Dawn, Pulp Fiction, and Reservoir Dogs.

In 1998, Ziad Doueiri wrote and directed his first feature film West Beirut, which received international fame, which stars his brother Rami Doueiri. The film was followed by Lila Says, which was shown at the Sundance Film Festival.

Doueiri worked between Los Angeles and Beirut until 2011 after which he returned to work from Beirut.

Doueiri directed his film The Attack in 2013, which caused controversy and was banned from showing in Lebanon and most Arab countries (except for Morocco and Dubai) because of the scenes that he filmed in Tel Aviv. Doueiri expressed opposition to boycotts of Israel, and in 2013 defended his decision to shoot a film in Israel featuring Israeli actors. The film is based on the story of Yasmina Khadra, with the same title. Its production cost 1.5 million dollars, with French and Egyptian funding and the Doha Film Institute. In September 2017, he was questioned in Beirut after returning from the Venice Film Festival.

His next film, "Foreign Affairs" is about a retired French diplomat (Gérard Depardieu) who is secretly sent by the American government to negotiate an agreement between Israel and the Palestine Liberation Organization on the Gaza Strip and the West Bank. His new movies are "Case No. 23" or The Insult.

Douiri resides in Paris.

== Filmography ==
Film name	Year	Genre	Role	Remarks
West Beirut	1998	Drama	Director, writer	Won the Prix François Chalais at the Directors' fortnight of the Cannes Film Festival in 1998.
Lila Says	2004	Drama	Director, writer	
Sleeper Cell	2005	Terror series	Director	Episode "Immigrant"
The Attack	2012	Drama, political thriller	Director, writer	An Arab surgeon in Tel Aviv discovers something about his wife after a suicide bombing; based on a novel by Yasmina Khadra
Affaire Étrangère (English title Foreign Affairs)	2013	Drama, political thriller	Director, writer	French thriller that centers on a retired French diplomat (Gérard Depardieu), secretly sent by the Americans to negotiate an Israeli-Palestinian agreement
Baron Noir (English title Republican Gangsters)	2016	Political drama	Director	French TV Series (8 episodes); Nominated - ACS Award for Best Director
The Insult	2017	Drama	Director, writer	Nominated for the Academy Award for Best Foreign Language Film
