= 66th Sydney Film Festival =

2019 film festival

- Opening film: Palm Beach by Rachel Ward
- Closing film: Yesterday by Danny Boyle
- Location: Sydney, New South Wales, Australia
- Founded: 1954
- Festival date: 5–16 June 2019
- Website: sff.org.au

Sydney Film Festival
- 67th 65th

The 66th annual Sydney Film Festival was held from 5 to 16 June 2019. Comedy drama film Palm Beach opened the festival and musical romantic comedy film Yesterday was the closing film.

Bong Joon-ho's dark comedy thriller film Parasite won the Sydney Film Prize.

== Juries ==
The following were named as the festival juries:

=== Sydney Film Prize ===
- John Maynard, Australian film producer – Jury President
- Ana Kokkinos, Australian filmmaker
- Wagner Moura, Brazilian actor
- Gaylene Preston, New Zealand filmmaker
- Ritu Sarin, Indian filmmaker

=== Documentary Australia Foundation Award ===
- Robert Nugent, Australian filmmaker
- Jialing Zhang, Chinese director
- Toni Stowers, Australian film producer

=== Dendy Awards for Australian Short Films ===
- Dany Cooper, Australian film editor
- Bill Gosden, New Zealand International Film Festival former director
- Teona Strugar Mitevska, Macedonian director

== Official selection ==
=== In competition ===
English title	Original title	Director(s)	Production country
Bacurau		Kleber Mendonça Filho, Juliano Dornelles	Brazil, France
Bellbird		Hamish Bennett	New Zealand
Dirty God		Sacha Polak	United Kingdom, Netherlands, Belgium, Ireland
God Exists, Her Name Is Petrunija	Gospod postoi, imeto ì e Petrunija	Teona Strugar Mitevska	Macedonia, Belgium, Slovenia, France, Croatia
Hearts and Bones		Ben Lawrence	Australia
Judy and Punch		Mirrah Foulkes	Australia
Monos		Alejandro Landes	Colombia, Argentina, Netherlands, Germany, Sweden, Uruguay
Never Look Away	Werk ohne Autor	Florian Henckel von Donnersmarck	Germany
Pain and Glory	Dolor y gloria	Pedro Almodóvar	Spain
Parasite	기생충	Bong Joon-ho	South Korea
The Souvenir		Joanna Hogg	United Kingdom
Synonyms	Synonymes	Nadav Lapid	France, Germany

Highlighted title indicates Sydney Film Prize winner.

=== Documentary Australia Foundation Award ===
English title	Original title	Director(s)
I Am No Bird		Em Baker
In My Blood It Runs		Maya Newell
It All Started with a Stale Sandwich		Samantha Lang
The Leunig Fragments		Kasimir Burgess
Life After the Oasis		Sascha Ettinger Epstein
Lili		Peter Hegedus
Martha: A Picture Story		Selina Miles
Sanctuary		Kaye Harrison
She Who Must Be Loved		Erica Glynn
White Light		George Gittoes

=== Special Presentations ===
English title	Original title	Director(s)	Production country
The Biggest Little Farm		John Chester	United States
Blinded by the Light		Gurinder Chadha	United Kingdom
Children of the Sea	海獣の子供	Ayumu Watanabe	Japan
The Dead Don't Die		Jim Jarmusch	United States
The Final Quarter		Ian Darling	Australia
High Life		Claire Denis	France, Germany, United Kingdom
Marighella		Wagner Moura	Brazil
Mystify: Michael Hutchence		Richard Lowenstein	Australia
Photograph		Ritesh Batra	India, United States, Germany
Rolling Thunder Revue: A Bob Dylan Story by Martin Scorsese		Martin Scorsese	United States
Skin		Guy Nattiv	United States
Slam		Partho Sen-Gupta	Australia, France
So Long, My Son	地久天长	Wang Xiaoshuai	China
Standing Up for Sunny		Steven Vidler	Australia
Varda by Agnès		Agnès Varda	France

=== Features ===
English title	Original title	Director(s)	Production country
Akasha		Hajooj Kuka	Sudan, South Africa, Qatar, Germany
Alpha, The Right To Kill		Brillante Mendoza	Philippines
American Woman		Jake Scott	United States
Angelo		Markus Schleinzer	Austria, Luxembourg
Animals		Sophie Hyde	Australia, Ireland, United Kingdom
Bait		Mark Jenkin	United Kingdom
Brittany Runs a Marathon		Paul Downs Colaizzo	United States
Clean Up	호흡	Kwon Man-ki	South Korea
Cold Sweat	عرق سرد	Soheil Beiraghi	Iran
Danger Close: The Battle of Long Tan		Kriv Stenders	Australia
Divine Love	Divino amor	Gabriel Mascaro	Brazil, Uruguay, Denmark, Norway, Chile, Sweden
Dolce Fine Giornata		Jacek Borcuch	Poland
The Extraordinary Journey of Celeste Garcia	El viaje extraordinario de Celeste García	Arturo Infante	Cuba, Germany
Flatland		Jenna Bass	South Africa, Luxembourg, Germany
Ghost Town Anthology	Répertoire des villes disparues	Denis Côté	Canada
Her Smell		Alex Ross Perry	United States
Happy New Year, Colin Burstead		Ben Wheatley	United Kingdom
I Am Mother		Grant Sputore	Australia
In Fabric		Peter Strickland	United Kingdom
Jesus	僕はイエス様が嫌い	Hiroshi Okuyama	Japan
Journey to a Mother's Room	Viaje al cuarto de una madre	Celia Rico Clavellino	Spain, France
Kursk		Thomas Vinterberg	France, Belgium, Luxembourg
Ladyworld		Amanda Kramer	United States
Manta Ray	กระเบนราหู	Phuttiphong Aroonpheng	Thailand, France, China
The Mountain		Rick Alverson	United States
The Nightingale		Jennifer Kent	Australia
Öndög		Wang Quan'an	Mongolia
Our Time	Nuestro tiempo	Carlos Reygadas	Germany, Mexico, France, Sweden, Denmark
Papi Chulo		John Butler	United States, Ireland
Piranhas	La paranza dei bambini	Claudio Giovannesi	Italy
The Public		Emilio Estevez	United States
Saturday Afternoon	Shonibar Bikel	Mostofa Sarwar Farooki	Bangladesh, Germany
School's Out	L'heure de la sortie	Sébastien Marnier	France
Screwdriver	Mafak	Bassam Jarbawi	Palestine, United States, Qatar
Sequin in a Blue Room		Samuel Van Grinsven	Australia
Sibel		Çağla Zencirci, Guillaume Giovanetti	France, Germany, Turkey, Luxembourg
Suburban Wildlife		Imogen McCluskey	Australia
The Sweet Requiem	སྐྱོ་དབྱངས་མངར་མོ།	Ritu Sarin, Tenzing Sonam	India, United States
A Tale of Three Sisters	Kız Kardeşler	Emin Alper	Turkey, Germany
The Third Wife	Vợ ba	Ash Mayfair	Vietnam
This Is Not Berlin	Esto no es Berlín	Hari Sama	Mexico
The Wedding Guest		Michael Winterbottom	United Kingdom
The White Crow		Ralph Fiennes	United Kingdom, United States, Serbia
Yuli: The Carlos Acosta Story		Icíar Bollaín	Spain, Cuba, United Kingdom, Germany

=== International Documentary ===
English title	Original title	Director(s)	Production country
The Amazing Johnathan Documentary		Ben Berman	United States
American Factory		Steven Bognar, Julia Reichert	United States
Anthropocene: The Human Epoch		Jennifer Baichwal, Nicholas de Pencier, Edward Burtynsky	Canada
Apollo 11		Todd Douglas Miller	United States
The Biggest Little Farm		John Chester	United States
The Brink		Alison Klayman	United States
Buddha in Africa		Nicole Schafer	Sweden, South Africa
The Edge of Democracy		Petra Costa	Brazil
Hail Satan?		Penny Lane	United States
Halston		Frédéric Tcheng	United States
Honeyland		Ljubomir Stefanov, Tamara Kotevska	Macedonia
Just Don't Think I'll Scream	Ne croyez surtout pas que je hurle	Frank Beauvais	France
The Kleptocrats		Sam Hobkinson, Havana Marking	United Kingdom
Leftover Women		Hilla Medalia, Shosh Shlam	Germany
Maiden		Alex Holmes	United Kingdom
Meeting Gorbachev		Werner Herzog, André Singer	United States, United Kingdom, Germany
Merata: How Mum Decolonised the Screen		Heperi Mita	New Zealand
Midnight Family		Luke Lorentzen	United States, Mexico
Midnight Traveler		Hassan Fazili	United States, Qatar, Canada, United Kingdom
The Miracle of the Little Prince		Marjoleine Boonstra	Netherlands
Monrovia, Indiana		Frederick Wiseman	United States
Nothing Fancy: Diana Kennedy		Elizabeth Carroll	United States
On the Inside of a Military Dictatorship		Karen Stokkendal Poulsen	Denmark, France
One Child Nation		Nanfu Wang, Jialing Zhang	China, United States
Picture Character		Ian Cheney, Martha Shane	United States, Germany, Japan, Argentina, Austria, United Kingdom, Scotland
Reason		Anand Patwardhan	India
School of Seduction		Alina Rudnitskaya	Denmark
Sea of Shadows		Richard Ladkani	Austria
Shooting the Mafia		Kim Longinotto	Ireland, United States
Talking About Trees		Suhaib Gasmelbari	France, Germany, Sudan, Chad, Qatar
Trixie Mattel: Moving Parts		Nick Zeig-Owens	United States
Untouchable		Ursula Macfarlane	United States
Up the Mountain		Zhang Yang	China
Varda by Agnès		Agnès Varda	France
The Wandering Chef	밥정	Park Hye-ryeong	South Korea
What Will Become of Us		Steven Cantor	United States
XY Chelsea		Tim Travers Hawkins	United States

=== Sounds On Screen ===
English title	Original title	Director(s)	Production country
Amazing Grace		Alan Elliott	United States
David Crosby: Remember My Name		A. J. Eaton	United States
A Dog Called Money		Seamus Murphy	United Kingdom, Ireland
Inna de Yard: The Soul of Jamaica		Peter Webber	France
Marianne & Leonard: Words of Love		Nick Broomfield	United Kingdom
Miles Davis: Birth of the Cool		Stanley Nelson Jr.	United States, United Kingdom

=== Europe! Voices of Women in Film ===
English title	Original title	Director(s)	Production country
The Best of Dorien B.		Anke Blondé	Belgium, Netherlands
Caviar	Kaviar	Elena Tikhonova	Austria
The Deposit	Tryggð	Ásthildur Kjartansdóttir	Iceland
Ever After	Endzeit	Carolina Hellsgård	Germany
Only You		Harry Wootliff	United Kingdom
Pause	Παύση	Tonia Mishiali	Cyprus, Greece
Queen of Hearts	Dronningen	May el-Toukhy	Denmark, Sweden
Retrospekt		Esther Rots	Netherlands, Belgium
Scheme Birds		Ellen Fiske, Ellinor Hallin	Sweden, United Kingdom
When Tomatoes Met Wagner		Marianna Economou	Greece

=== Focus on New Zealand ===
English title	Original title	Director(s)	Production country
Capital in the 21st Century		Justin Pemberton	New Zealand
The Chills: The Triumph & Tragedy of Martin Phillipps		Julia Parnell	New Zealand
Daffodils		David Stubbs	New Zealand
The Heart Dances		Rebecca Tansley	New Zealand
Merata: How Mum Decolonised the Screen		Heperi Mita	New Zealand

=== First Nations ===
English title	Original title	Director(s)	Production country
The Body Remembers When the World Broke Open		Elle-Máijá Tailfeathers, Kathleen Hepburn	Canada, Norway
Dark Place		Kodie Bedford, Perun Bonser, Rob Braslin, Liam Phillips, Bjorn Stewart	Australia
She Who Must Be Loved		Erica Glynn	Australia
Vai		Nicole Whippy, Amberley Jo Aumua, Becs Arahanga, Matasila Freshwater, Dianna Fuemana, Mīria George, ʻOfa-Ki-Levuka Guttenbeil-Likiliki, Marina Alofagia McCartney, Sharon Whippy	New Zealand

== Awards ==
The following awards were presented at the festival:

- Sydney Film Prize: Parasite by Bong Joon-ho
- Documentary Australia Award for Australian Documentary: She Who Must Be Loved by Erica Glynn
- Dendy Awards for Australian Short Films
  - Dendy Live Action Short Award: All These Creatures by Charles Williams
  - Rouben Mamoulian Award for Best Director: Charles Williams for All These Creatures
  - Yoram Gross Animation Award: Sohrab and Rustum by Lee Whitmore
- Event Cinemas Australian Short Screenplay Award: Michael Hudson for Ties That Bind
  - Special Mention: Victoria Hunt for Take
- Sydney-UNESCO City of Film Award: Darren Dale and Rachel Perkins of Blackfella Films
