= 65th Sydney Film Festival =

2018 film festival

- Opening film: The Breaker Upperers by Madeleine Sami and Jackie van Beek
- Closing film: Hearts Beat Loud by Brett Haley
- Location: Sydney, New South Wales, Australia
- Festival date: 6–17 June 2018
- Website: sff.org.au

Sydney Film Festival
- 66th 64th

The 65th annual Sydney Film Festival took place from 6 to 17 June 2018 in Sydney, Australia. The festival opened with Madeleine Sami and Jackie van Beek's romantic comedy film The Breaker Upperers. It closed with Brett Haley's musical comedy-drama film Hearts Beat Loud.

Marcelo Martinessi's drama film The Heiresses won the most prestigious award of the festival, Sydney Film Prize.

== Juries ==
The following people were named as the festival juries:

=== Sydney Film Prize ===
- Lynette Wallworth, Australian artist and filmmaker
- Bianca Balbuena, Filipino producer and writer
- Chris Letcher, South African film composer
- Ewen Leslie, Australian actor
- Yoshi Yatabe, programming director of Tokyo International Film Festival

=== Documentary Australia Foundation Award for Australian Documentary ===
- Shameela Sadat, South African filmmaker
- Melanie Miller, American film producer
- Maya Newell, Australian filmmaker

=== Dendy Awards for Australian Short Films ===
- Miranda Harcourt, New Zealand actress
- Stephen Basil-Jones, executive vice president of Sony Pictures Entertainment
- Kylie Du Fresne, Australian film producer

== Official selection ==
=== Opening and closing films ===
English title	Original title	Director(s)	Production countrie(s)
The Breaker Upperers (opening film)		Madeleine Sami, Jackie van Beek	New Zealand
Hearts Beat Loud (closing film)		Brett Haley	United States

=== In competition ===
English title	Original title	Director(s)	Production countrie(s)
Ága		Milko Lazarov	Bulgaria, Germany, France
BlacKkKlansman		Spike Lee	United States
Daughter of Mine	Figlia mia	Laura Bispuri	Italy, Germany, Switzerland
The Heiresses	Las herederas	Marcelo Martinessi	Paraguay, Germany, Brazil, Uruguay, Norway, France
Jirga		Benjamin Gilmour	Australia
Leave No Trace		Debra Granik	United States
Matangi/Maya/M.I.A.		Stephen Loveridge	United Kingdom, United States, Sri Lanka
The Miseducation of Cameron Post		Desiree Akhavan	United States
One Day	Egy nap	Zsófia Szilágyi	Hungary
The Seen and Unseen	Sekala Niskala	Kamila Andini	Indonesia, Netherlands, Australia, Qatar
Transit		Christian Petzold	Germany, France
Wajib		Annemarie Jacir	Palestine, France, Germany, Colombia, Norway, Qatar, United Arab Emirates

=== Documentary Australia Foundation Award ===
English title	Original title	Director(s)	Production countrie(s)
Backtrack Boys		Catherine Scott	Australia
China Love		Olivia Martin-McGuire	Australia, China
Dying to Live		Richard Todd	Australia
Finke: There & Back		Dylan River	Australia
Ghosthunter		Ben Lawrence	Australia
I Used to Be Normal: A Boyband Fangirl Story		Jessica Leski	Australia
In the Land of Wolves		Grace McKenzie	Australia
Oyster		Kim Beamish	Australia
RocKabul		Travis Beard	Afghanistan, Australia, Bosnia and Herzegovina, India, Turkey
Teach a Man to Fish		Grant Saunders	Australia

=== Dendy Awards for Australian Short Films ===
English title	Original title	Director(s)	Production countrie(s)
Asian Girls		Hyun Lee	Australia
Barbara		Larissa Behrendt, Marieka Walsh	Australia
Bubble	Hobab	Ronak Taher	Australia
Drum Wave		Natalie Erika James	Australia
Judas Collar		Alison James	Australia
Lost & Found		Andrew Goldsmith, Bradley Slabe	Australia
Nursery Rhymes		Tom Noakes	Australia
On Hold		Jake Nielsen, Matthew Predny	Australia
Second Best		Alyssa McClelland	Australia
Tied		Stephanie Davison, Isabella Spagnolo	Australia

=== Special Presentations ===
English title	Original title	Director(s)	Production countrie(s)
3 Faces		Jafar Panahi	Iran
American Animals		Bart Layton	United States
Don't Worry, He Won't Get Far on Foot		Gus Van Sant	United States
Foxtrot		Samuel Maoz	Germany, France, Switzerland
The Guilty	Den skyldige	Gustav Möller	Denmark
The Insult	L'insulte	Ziad Doueiri	France, Lebanon
Juliet, Naked		Jesse Peretz	United States
The Kindergarten Teacher		Sara Colangelo	United States
Manto		Nandita Das	India
Mirai		Mamoru Hosoda	Japan
Pope Francis: A Man of His Word		Wim Wenders	Italy, Switzerland, Germany, France
West of Sunshine		James Raftopoulos	Australia
The Wife		Björn Runge	Sweden, United Kingdom
The Wild Pear Tree	Ahlat Ağacı	Nuri Bilge Ceylan	Turkey
You Were Never Really Here		Lynne Ramsay	United States, United Kingdom, France

=== Focus on Italy ===
English title	Original title	Director(s)	Production countrie(s)
A Ciambra		Jonas Carpignano	Italy, France, United States, Germany
The Ark of Disperata	La vita in comune	Edoardo Winspeare	Italy
Beautiful Things		Giorgio Ferrero	Italy
Daughter of Mine	Figlia mia	Laura Bispuri	Italy, Germany, Switzerland
Friends by Chance	Tutto quello che vuoi	Francesco Bruni	Italy
Nico, 1988		Susanna Nicchiarelli	Italy, Belgium

=== Features ===
English title	Original title	Director(s)	Production countrie(s)
America Town		Jeon Soo-il	South Korea
Anchor and Hope		Carlos Marqués-Marcet	Spain, United Kingdom
Beirut		Brad Anderson	United States
The Blood of Wolves	孤狼の血	Kazuya Shiraishi	Japan
Brothers' Nest		Clayton Jacobson	Australia
Butterflies	Kelebekler	Tolga Karaçelik	Turkey
The Charmer	Charmøren	Milad Alami	Denmark, Sweden
The Children Act		Richard Eyre	United States
Chocolate Oyster		Steve Jaggi	Australia
Disobedience		Sebastián Lelio	United States
An Elephant Sitting Still	大象席地而坐	Hu Bo	China
The Great Buddha+		Huang Hsin-yao	Taiwan
Hard Paint	Tinta bruta	Filipe Matzembacher, Marcio Reolon	Brazil
The Hungry Lion	飢えたライオン	Takaomi Ogata	Japan
In the Aisles	In den Gängen	Thomas Stuber	Germany
Lean on Pete		Andrew Haigh	United Kingdom, United States
The Line	Čiara	Peter Bebjak	Slovakia, Ukraine
Mehsampur		Kabir Chowdhry	India
Mektoub, My Love: Canto Uno		Abdellatif Kechiche	France
Mug	Twarz	Małgorzata Szumowska	Poland
No Date, No Signature	بدون تاریخ، بدون امضاء	Vahid Jalilvand	Iran
Number 37	Nommer 37	Nosipho Dumisa	South Africa
A Paris Education	Mes provinciales	Jean-Paul Civeyrac	France
Pig	خوک	Mani Haghighi	Iran
Puzzle		Marc Turtletaub	United States
Rafiki		Wanuri Kahiu	Kenya
The Reports on Sarah and Saleem		Muayad Alayan	Palestine, Netherlands, Germany, Mexico
The Rider		Chloé Zhao	United States
Samui Song	ไม่มีสมุยสำหรับเธอ	Pen-ek Ratanaruang	Thailand, Germany, Norway
The Seagull		Michael Mayer	United States
Searching		Aneesh Chaganty	United States
A Season in France	Une Saison en France	Mahamat-Saleh Haroun	France
Season of the Devil	Ang Panahon ng Halimaw	Lav Diaz	Philippines
The Second		Mairi Cameron	Australia
Skate Kitchen		Crystal Moselle	United States
Strange Colours		Alena Lodkina	Australia
Support the Girls		Andrew Bujalski	United States
The Taste of Rice Flower	米花之味	Pengfei Song	China
Touch Me Not		Adina Pintilie	Romania, Germany, Czech Republic, France, Bulgaria
Tyrel		Sebastián Silva	United States
A Vigilante		Sarah Daggar-Nickson	United States
We the Animals		Jeremiah Zagar	United States
Wrath of Silence	暴裂无声	Xin Yukun	China
Zama		Lucrecia Martel	Argentina, Brazil, Spain, France, Netherlands, Mexico, Portugal, United States

=== International Documentaries ===
English title	Original title	Director(s)	Production countrie(s)
The Ancient Woods	Sengirė	Mindaugas Survila	Lithuania, Estonia, Germany
Bisbee '17		Robert Greene	United States
Chef Flynn		Cameron Yates	United States
The Cleaners		Moritz Riesewieck, Hans Block	Germany, Brazil
Cold Blooded: The Clutter Family Murders		Joe Berlinger	United States
The Deminer		Hogir Hirori	Sweden
The Distant Barking of Dogs		Simon Lereng Wilmont	Denmark, Finland, Sweden
Ex Libris: The New York Public Library		Frederick Wiseman	United States
Filmworker		Tony Zierra	United States
Genesis 2.0		Christian Frei	Switzerland
Habaneros	Havana	Julien Temple	United Kingdom
Half the Picture		Amy Adrion	United States
The Ice King		James Erskine	United Kingdom
Inland Sea	港町	Kazuhiro Soda	Japan
Inventing Tomorrow		Laura Nix	United States, Mexico, India, Indonesia
Jill Bilcock: Dancing the Invisible		Axel Grigor	Australia
John McEnroe: In the Realm of Perfection		Julien Faraut	France
Kusama: Infinity		Heather Lenz	United States
The Long Season		Leonard Retel Helmrich	Netherlands
Lots of Kids, a Monkey and a Castle		Gustavo Salmerón	Spain
McQueen		Ian Bonhôte	United Kingdom
A Murder in Mansfield		Barbara Kopple	United States
Of Fathers and Sons		Talal Derki	Germany, Syria, Lebanon, Qatar
On Her Shoulders		Alexandria Bombach	United States
The Other Side of Everything		Mila Turajlić	Serbia, France, Qatar
Over the Limit		Marta Prus	Finland, Germany, Poland
The Poetess		Stefanie Brockhaus, Andreas Wolff	Germany
The Prince of Nothingwood		Sonia Kronlund	France, Germany, Qatar
Speak Up	À voix haute	Stéphane de Freitas, Ladj Ly	France
That Summer		Göran Hugo Olsson	Sweden, United States, Denmark
Three Identical Strangers		Tim Wardle	United Kingdom, United States
The Venerable W.	Le vénérable W.	Barbet Schroeder	France, Switzerland
Westwood: Punk, Icon, Activist		Lorna Tucker	United Kingdom
Whispering Truth to Power		Shameela Seedat	South Africa, Netherlands
Wik vs Queensland		Dean Gibson	Australia
Yellow Is Forbidden		Pietra Brettkelly	China, New Zealand
Young Solitude	Premières solitudes	Claire Simon	France

=== Europe! Voices of Women in Film ===
English title	Original title	Director(s)	Production countrie(s)
3 Days in Quiberon	3 Tage in Quiberon	Emily Atef	Germany, Austria, France
L'Animale		Katharina Mückstein	Austria
Cobain		Nanouk Leopold	Netherlands, Belgium, Germany
Entrepreneur	Yrittäjä	Virpi Suutari	Finland
The Heart	Hjärtat	Fanni Metelius	Sweden
Holiday		Isabella Eklöf	Denmark, Netherlands, Sweden, Turkey
The Marriage	Martesa	Blerta Zeqiri	Kosovo, Albania
A Mother Brings Her Son to Be Shot		Sinéad O'Shea	Ireland, United Kingdom
Scary Mother	საშიში დედა	Ana Urushadze	Georgia, Estonia
Tower. A Bright Day.	Wieża. Jasny dzień	Jagoda Szelc	Poland

=== Family Films ===
English title	Original title	Director(s)	Production countrie(s)
The Breadwinner		Nora Twomey	Ireland, Canada, Luxembourg
The Changeover		Miranda Harcourt, Stuart McKenzie	New Zealand
Dressage	درساژ	Pooya Badkoobeh	Iran
Maya the Bee: The Honey Games		Noel Cleary, Sergio Delfino	Australia, Germany
Pick of the Litter		Dana Nachman, Don Hardy	United States
Skate Kitchen		Crystal Moselle	United States

=== FLUX: ART+FILM ===
English title	Original title	Director(s)	Production countrie(s)
24 Frames	۲۴ فریم	Abbas Kiarostami	Iran
[Censored]		Sari Braithwaite	Australia
Dragonfly Eyes	蜻蜓之眼	Xu Bing	China
Instructions on Parting		Amy Jenkins	United States
Lek and the Dogs		Andrew Kötting	United Kingdom, France, Chile
Looking for Oum Kulthum		Shirin Neshat	Germany, Austria, Italy, Qatar, Lebanon
The Pure Necessity	Die reine Notwendigkeit	David Claerbout	Belgium
Terror Nullius		Soda_Jerk	Australia

=== Sounds on Screen ===
English title	Original title	Director(s)	Production countrie(s)
Bad Reputation		Kevin Kerslake	United States
I Used to be Normal: A Boyband Fangirl Story		Jessica Leski	Australia
Matangi/Maya/M.I.A.		Stephen Loveridge	United Kingdom, United States, Sri Lanka
RocKabul		Travis Beard	Afghanistan, Australia, Bosnia and Herzegovina, India, Turkey
Ryuichi Sakamoto: Coda		Stephen Nomura Schible	United States, Japan
Whitney		Kevin Macdonald	United Kingdom

=== Freak Me Out ===
English title	Original title	Director(s)	Production countrie(s)
The Field Guide to Evil		Veronika Franz and Severin Fiala, Katrin Gebbe, Calvin Reeder, Agnieszka Smoczyńska, Peter Strickland, Yannis Veslemes, Can Evrenol, Ashim Ahluwalia	United States, Poland, Hungary, India, Germany, Austria, Turkey, Greece
Ghost Stories		Jeremy Dyson, Andy Nyman	United Kingdom
Good Manners	As Boas Maneiras	Juliana Rojas, Marco Dutra	
Piercing		Nicolas Pesce	United States
The Ranger		Jenn Wexler	United States
Upgrade		Leigh Whannell	Australia
What Keeps You Alive		Colin Minihan	Canada

=== The Box Set ===
English title	Original title	Director(s)	Original network	Production countrie(s)
Deep State		Robert Connolly, Matthew Parkhill	Fox	United Kingdom

=== Essential ===
The festival paid tribute to the Finnish filmmaker Aki Kaurismäki, selected by film critic David Stratton.

English title	Original title	Director(s)	Production countrie(s)
Crime and Punishment (1983)	Rikos ja rangaistus	Aki Kaurismäki	Finland
Shadows in Paradise (1986)	Varjoja paratiisissa	Aki Kaurismäki	Finland
Ariel (1988)		Aki Kaurismäki	Finland
Leningrad Cowboys Go America (1989)		Aki Kaurismäki	Finland, Sweden
The Match Factory Girl (1990)	Tulitikkutehtaan tyttö	Aki Kaurismäki	Finland, Sweden
La Vie de bohème (1992)	Finland, France, Sweden, Germany	Aki Kaurismäki	
Drifting Clouds (1996)	Kauas pilvet karkaavat	Aki Kaurismäki	Finland
The Man Without a Past (2002)	Mies vailla menneisyyttä	Aki Kaurismäki	Finland, Germany, France
Lights in the Dusk (2006)	Laitakaupungin valot	Aki Kaurismäki	Finland, Germany, France
Le Havre (2011)		Aki Kaurismäki	France, Finland, Germany

=== Classics Restored ===
English title	Original title	Director(s)	Production countrie(s)
A Brighter Summer Day (1991)	牯岭街少年杀人事件	Edward Yang	Taiwan
God's Gift (1982)	Wend Kuuni	Gaston Kaboré	Burkina Faso
The Marriage of Maria Braun (1979)	Die Ehe der Maria Braun	Rainer Werner Fassbinder	Germany
My 20th Century (1988)	Az én XX. századom	Ildikó Enyedi	Hungary
My Brilliant Career (1979)		Gillian Armstrong	Australia
Strange Days (1995)		Kathryn Bigelow	United States

== Awards ==
The following awards were presented at the festival:

- Sydney Film Prize: The Heiresses by Marcelo Martinessi
- Documentary Australia Foundation Award for Australian Documentary: Ghosthunter by Ben Lawrence
- Dendy Awards for Australian Short Films
  - Dendy Live Action Short Award: Second Best by Alyssa McClelland
  - Rouben Mamoulian Award for Best Director: Tom Noakes for Nursery Rhymes
  - Yoram Gross Animation Award: Lost & Found by Andrew Goldsmith and Bradley Slabe
  - Special Mentions: Barbara by Larissa Behrendt and Marieka Walsh; Judas Collar by Alison James
- Event Cinemas Australian Short Screenplay Award: Tyson Mowarin for Undiscovered Country
  - Special Mentions: Renée Marie Petropoulos for Tangle and Knots; Lucy Knox for An Act of Love; Curtis Taylor and Nathan Mewett for Yulubidyi – Until the End
- UNESCO Sydney City of Film Award: Warwick Thornton

=== Audience Awards ===
The Audience Award for Best Narrative Feature

1. The Insult by Ziad Doueiri
2. Searching by Aneesh Chaganty
3. Rafiki by Wanuri Kahiu
4. An Elephant Sitting Still by Hu Bo
5. Ága by Milko Lazarov and Leave No Trace by Debra Granik (tied)

The Audience Award for Best Documentary

1. Backtrack Boys by Catherine Scott
2. Teach a Man to Fish by Grant Leigh Saunders
3. I Used to Be Normal: A Boyband Fangirl Story by Jessica Leski
4. Oyster by Kim Beamish
5. Jill Bilcock: Dancing the Invisible by Axel Grigor
