= Brandon Moore (composer) =

American composer (born 1976)

- Born: November 25, 1976 (age 49); Arlington, Texas, U.S.
- Genres: Film score, orchestral
- Occupation: Film composer
- Years active: 2000–present

Brandon Moore (born November 25, 1976) is an American composer known for Universal's Aliens Ate My Homework (2018) and the sequel Aliens Stole My Body (2020) featuring the voice talents of William Shatner and George Takei. He’s also known for the comedy-horror series Killer Sisters' Midnight Hour (2012) for Hulu, and the IFS Festival's Best Drama winner The Year I Did Nothing (2019). Brandon has been a musician since an early age and a life-long lover of film music. Upon completing his undergrad in music theory and composition in Fort Worth, TX, he moved to Los Angeles to attend USC's Film Scoring program. Brandon has composed a wide range of scores for a variety of film projects and genres. His music has played in film festivals all over the world for as long as he's been an active composer in Hollywood.

== Biography ==
=== Early life ===
Brandon Moore grew up listening to film scores and performing music in his native Arlington, Texas. His father John Moore (1942-2011) was an architect and his mother Cheryl Ford-Mente, a communications director for non-profit organizations, was heavily involved in Dallas-Fort Worth community theater as an actress and fundraiser and host of a local cable talk show "Around Arlington." Brandon's parents encouraged him to start playing music at an early age. He switched from piano, viola, and finally settling on the trombone in high school. Brandon credits his dad for his introduction to film music:

My dad would buy these soundtrack albums. He had a wide range of vinyl, but he occasionally had a pop soundtrack album and a score album here and there, but there were three that I remember listening to a lot: Raiders of the Lost Ark, Return of the Jedi and Superman: The Movie. And I wore these records out, scratched them and everything. I was probably about 11 years old when I realized they were all written by John Williams.

=== Education ===
In 1999 he graduated from Texas Christian University with a Bachelor of Music degree in music theory and composition. That same year he moved to Los Angeles to study film scoring professionally at the University of Southern California's Scoring for Motion Pictures and Television program. At USC, Brandon had the privilege of studying under accomplished film composers Elmer Bernstein, David Raksin and Christopher Young.

== Discography ==
=== Soundtracks ===
Title	Release date	Label	Format
Aliens Stole My Body	July 31, 2020	Back Lot Music	digital download
Aliens Ate My Homework	March 2, 2018	Back Lot Music	digital download
Ray Bradbury's Chrysalis	August 15, 2009	Independent release	CD, digital download

== Works ==
=== Films ===
Year	Title	Director	Type	Notes
2024	Which Hunt	Adam P. Cray	Short	New Bedford Film Festival official selection and premiere
2023	Don't Raise the Dead (the Board Game)	Michael Benni Pierce	Short	LA Screamfest official selection and premiere
2023	Where The Dead Go	Alberto G. Rodriguez	Feature	2023 South Texas International Film Festival pre-festival showcase, 2024 Golden State Film Fest official selection and West Coast premiere
2022	Motion At Your Door	Jared Rivet	Short	LA Screamfest official selection and premiere
2020	Alma's Pond	Roger Lay Jr.	Short	Hollywood Just4Shorts Best Drama Short award winner
2020	Aliens Stole My Body	Sean McNamara	Feature	—N/a
2019	The Year I Did Nothing	Ana Barredo	Foreign Language (Philippines)	IFS Film Festival 2019 Best Dramatic Feature Film award winner, Cebu International Film Festival Best Long Form award winner, TWIFF Best Narrative Feature award winner, GIFF Best Feature and Best Female Director awards winner,
2018	Aliens Ate My Homework	Sean McNamara	Feature	—N/a
2013	Our Urban Wilderness	John Winningham	Feature	—N/a
2012	Toy Masters	Corey Landis, Roger Lay Jr.	Documentary	
2011	The Table	Ana Barredo	Documentary	SoCal Independent Film Festival award winner
2008	Ray Bradbury's Chrysalis	Tony Báez Milán	Feature	Phoenix International Horror & Sci-Fi Festival award winner
2007	Return To Vietnam	Charles Domokos	Documentary	Silver Telly Award winner
2007	Ackerman on Bradbury	Roger Lay Jr.	Documentary Short	
2006	Forest Lawn: The First Hundred Years	Jeremy Weiss	Documentary	
2005	A Piece of Wood	Tony Báez Milán	Short	
2004	The Gentleman Don La Mancha	Ted Roach	Feature	Mexico International Film Festival award winner

=== Series ===
Year	Title	Director	Notes
2023	The Party	Geneva Willis, Margaret Borchert and Tori Chancellor	web series
2014	Dysfunctionally Organized	Nimo Mathenge	web series
2012	Killer Sisters' Midnight Hour	Mike Williamson	Hulu original series

=== Audio Dramas ===
Year	Title	Director	Notes
2021	Tales From the Dead of Night 2	Jared Rivet	Earbud Theater Podcast. Original theme and end credits; Segments "Night Moves" and "The Bellows"
2018	Tales From the Dead of Night	Jared Rivet	Earbud Theater Podcast. Original theme and end credits; Segment "Knife Flip" uses original track titled "Possession"
2018	The Current	Jared Rivet	Earbud Theater Podcast

=== Concert Works ===
- Aura Collage for Solo Trombone and Brass Ensemble
  - World premiere held at the 2024 International Trombone Festival in Fort Worth, Texas performed by Dr. Dave Begnoche and the Center Stage Brass on June 1st at Pepsico Hall on the campus of Texas Christian University.
  - Instrumentation: Solo Trombone, 4 Trumpets, 2 Alto Horns, Tenor Trombone, Euphonium, Bass Trombone and Tuba.
- Firethorn for Trombone Octet
  - Written for the Red River Trombones "8x8x8" series and performed at the 2019 International Trombone Festival held in Muncie, Indiana at Ball State University. The world premiere with its additional 2nd movement was performed by the TCU Trombone Choir for the 2021 TCU Trombone Summit concert.
- The Alien for Theremin, Clarinet, Trombone and Narrator
  - Instrumental accompaniment to poem recitation, first performed in 2013 Los Angeles, California in dedication to author Ray Bradbury.
- The Cylindrical Sea for Alto Saxophone, String Quartet and Xylophone
- Nonet for Flute, Clarinet, French Horn, Bassoon, String Quartet and Percussion
- Brass Quintet
- Flute Duet No. 1
- Triumvirate for 2 Trumpets and Trombone
- Faith of Our Fathers hymn arrangement for Brass Ensemble (Live Oak House)

== Awards, nominations and recognition ==
=== Wins ===
2024 Hollywood Blood Horror Festival Winner - Best Original Score, Brandon Moore - Don't Raise The Dead (The Board Game)

=== Nominations ===
2018 Audio Verse Awards Finalist - Original Compositions for Self-Contained Productions and Original Compositions for Dramatic Productions - episode The Current for Earbud Theater

2012 Park City Film Music Festival Award Nomination for Best Impact of Music in a Documentary - The Table
