= Vai (film) =

- Directed by: Becs Arahanga; Amberley Jo Aumua; Matasila Freshwater; Dianna Fuemana; Miria George; Ofa Guttenbeil; Marina McCartney; Nicole Whippy; Sharon Whippy
- Written by: Becs Arahanga; Amberley Jo Aumua; Matasila Freshwater; Dianna Fuemana; Miria George; Ofa Guttenbeil; Marina McCartney; Nicole Whippy; Sharon Whippy
- Starring: Ro Mereani Adi Tuimatanisiga, Ar-Ramadi Longopoa, Betsy Lania Luitolo
- Release date: 2019
- Running time: 88 minutes
- Countries: Fiji; Tonga; Solomon Islands; Cook Islands; Samoa; Niue; New Zealand
- Languages: English; Fijian; Roviana; Samoan; Niuean; New Zealand Maori; Cook Island Maori

Vai is a 2019 anthology film about women from the Pacific Islands by nine directors from the Pacific Islands: Nicole & Sharon Whippy (Fiji), 'Ofa-Ki-Levuka Guttenbeil-Likiliki (Tonga), Matasila Freshwater (Solomon Islands), Amberley Jo Aumua (New Zealand born Samoa), Mīria George (Cook Islands), Marina Alofagia McCartney (Samoa), Dianna Fuemana (Niue), Becs Arahanga (New Zealand). New Zealand is mentioned by its Maori name, Aotearoa. The film is in English, Fijian, Roviana, Samoan, Niuean, New Zealand Maori and Cook Island Maori (Rarotongan).

The film follows the stories of different women from the Pacific Islands. The segments focus on women in different stages of their lives, exploring themes of autonomy, female emancipation, and the bond one has with their culture.

== Plot ==
- Fiji, directed by Sharon and Nicole Whippy: Sevaia age 7 has to say goodbye to her family and country of origin.
- Tonga, directed by 'Ofa-Ki-Levuka Guttenbeil-Likiliki: Vai Mo'ui age 13 dreams of going to New Zealand to become a singer and her daily life consists of drinking water.
- Solomon Islands, directed by Matasila Freshwater: Vaelusa aged 16 fishes with her mother around the Solomon Islands and argues about the manner of fishing.
- New Zealand born Samoan, directed by Amberley Jo Aumua: Vaisea age 21 has a family that has made sacrifices so that she can pursue her studies at a university in New Zealand. She is stuck between family pressure and her education in a world that doesn't understand her.
- Kūki 'Āirani (Cook Islands) by Mīria George: Vai aged 30 engages in action to bring change to Rarotonga Island, in an effort to stop a foreign fishing company from owning all the waters around the island.
- Samoa, by Marina Alofagia McCartney: Sevai age 42 returns to her hometown after many years for a traditional ceremony.
- Niue, by Dianna Fuemana: Vai age 64 tries to convince her granddaughter, Moana to leave Niue for a different life.
- Aotearoa (New Zealand), by Becs Arahanga: Rapuwai age 80 celebrates the "baptism" of her great-granddaughter, Vai.

== Production ==
In 2017, Kerry Warkia and Kiel McNaughton, due to the production company, Brown Sugar Apple Grunt, produced the critically acclaimed film, Waru. Soon after, they proposed the film, Vai. In January 2018, Kerry Warkia and Kiel McNaughton contacted various filmmakers from the Pacific Islands to submit their film for the project. The selected directors stayed at the Waiheke Island for five days on a writers' retreat to write the script. The film was presented at the opening of the 2019 Berlin Film Festival.

== Accolades ==
- Best Screenplay, Melbourne International Film Festival, 2019
- Best Film, Seattle International Film Festival, 2019
