= Vaimoana Niumeitolu =

Tongan actress

Vaimoana (Moana) Litia Makakaufaki Niumeitolu is an actress, poet and artist. She was born in Tonga and lives in the United States of America.

Niumeitolu was born in Nuku'alofa, Tonga, the youngest of six children. Her father was Tevita Tangata 'o Lakepa Niumeitolu, a primary school teacher and interpreter for the Tongan government, and her mother was Litia Makakaufaki; her mother introduced her father to the Church of Jesus Christ of Latter-day Saints after their marriage. The family moved to Hawai'i when Litia won a scholarship to study at Brigham Young University–Hawaii, and then moved on to Utah, living first in Provo and then in Orem. The family became involved with the Pacific Islanders Club at the University of Utah, organising and contributing to an art exhibit there in 1998 entitled Tiritiri O Te Moana (Gifts From the Sea), which included visual art created by Niumeitolu.

Niumeitolu graduated from New York University in painting and performance, earned the Ellen Battell Stoeckel Fellowship in painting and drawing from Yale University, and attended Columbia University's Graduate Program in Acting.

She is the founder of Mahina Movement, an all-woman music and poetry trio, with Gabriella Callendar and Erica De La Rosa. The group performs stories of people dealing with multiple identities as a result of living in, or growing up in, a number of cultures. She has also directed and written over 20 educational theater productions. As an actor, she has appeared at the Metropolitan Opera, and also created a one-woman show, Tongue-in Paint, in which she plays thirteen characters. Her other production, A Prayer for Tonga, premiered at Harvard University.

Niumeitolu has painted community murals in Los Angeles, the Bronx, New Zealand, Australia, Utah, Brooklyn, South Africa, and Palestine. She has also led community art projects in New York City and in Alaska, California, Utah, Texas, as well as internationally in Italy, Ireland, and South Africa.

In 2019 Niumeitolu was awarded the 2019 Tautai International Artist in Residence in New Zealand by the Tautai Pacific Arts Trust.
