= Halfdan Hussey =

American film director

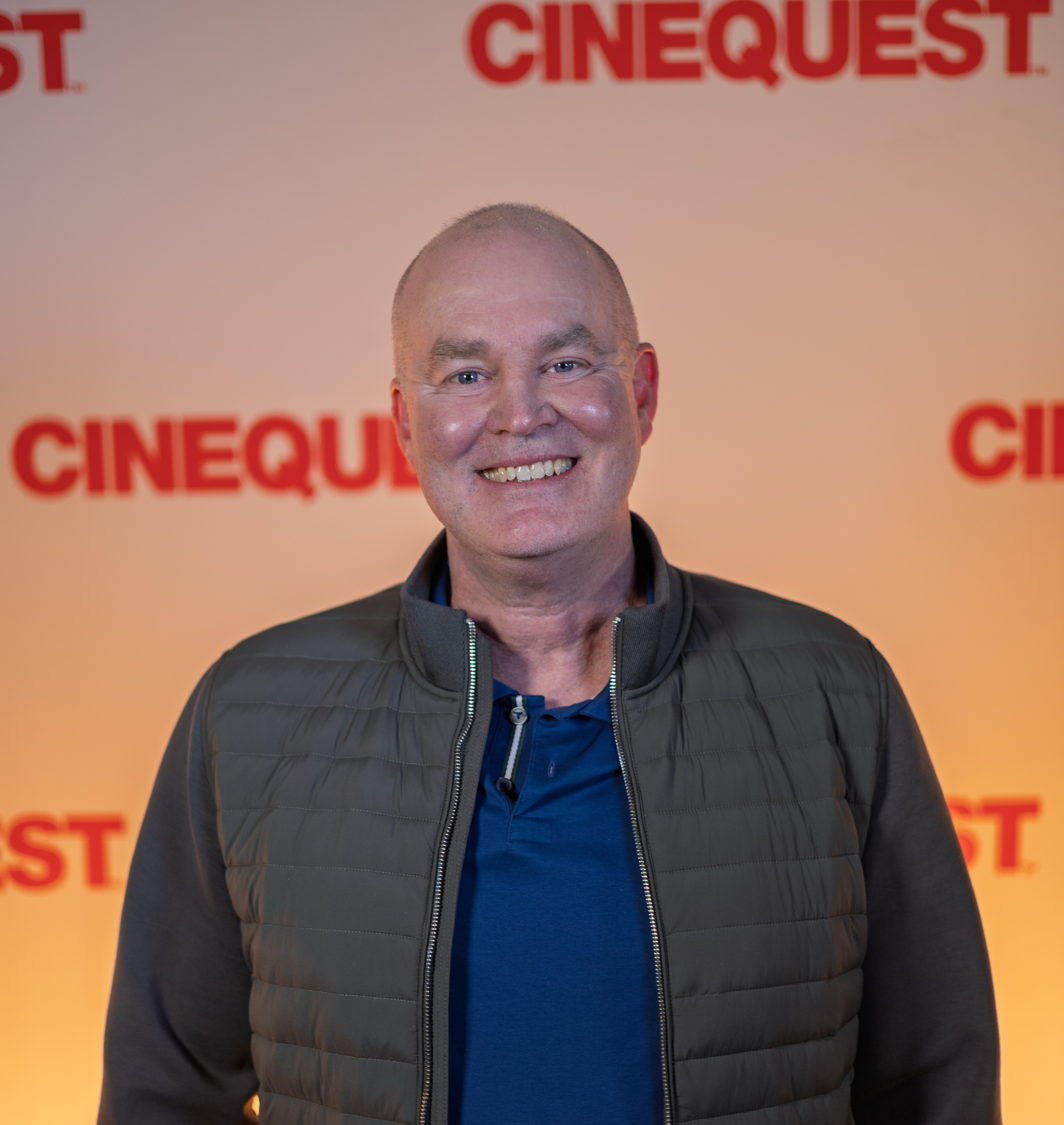
- Hussey at the Cinequest Film & Creativity Festival in 2026

Halfdan Hussey is the director and co-founder of Cinequest Inc, and the CEO of Creatics Enterprises and Cinequest Maverick Studio LLC. He is the author of To The Dogs and 7 Powers of Creating and the film director, and producer of Life is Love and Seizing Me. Halfdan was named one of the 25 people who dramatically changed the Silicon Valley, over the past 25 years by Metro Newspaper 2010.

== Early life ==
Hussey was raised in Boulder, Colorado. His father was a teacher and worked part-time as a projectionist. He graduated from University of Colorado Summa Cum Laude in English. He later moved to New York City and took film classes at NYU. While writing the screenplay for his first film, He’s Still There, he worked as a taxi cab driver in New York City.

== Career ==
Hussey co-founded the Cinequest Film & Creativity Festival and Cinequest Distribution with Kathleen Powell in 1990. It was listed as one of the top 10 film festivals and best digital festivals by The Ultimate Guide to Film Festivals in 2004. Cinequest was named Best Film Festival (2015) and Runner Up to Best Film Festival (2024) by USA Today Readers. Hussey built the Cinequest Picture The Possibilities youth empowerment services.

Hussey is the Co-founder and CEO of Creatics Enterprises, an ecosystem for film and media creativity, education, funding, distribution, marketing, and community.

Hussey has written two books, To The Dogs and 7 Powers of Creating. To The Dogs is a fictional novel about two brothers who must decide whether to follow their father’s footsteps in crime or take another path. 7 Powers of Creating is a non-fiction novel that shows the seven necessary steps to transform one’s ideas into reality.

Hussey is the Chair of Maverick Studio LLC. This company produces, co-produces, and distributes films, documentaries, television, and new media. In 2003, he produced and directed Seizing Me. In 2008, he wrote and directed Still Waters Burn. In 2014, he directed and produced Life is Love. The film centers around Somaly Mam and young women who are survivors of sex trafficking in Cambodia.
