= 67th Sydney Film Festival =

2020 film festival

- Location: Sydney, New South Wales, Australia
- Founded: 1954
- No. of films: 33
- Festival date: 10–21 June 2020
- Website: sff.org.au

Sydney Film Festival
- 68th 66th

The 67th annual Sydney Film Festival was held from 10 to 21 June 2020. Due to the COVID-19 pandemic, the film screenings were held virtually for the first time. In contrast to the regular editions, the festival only held four programs: Australian documentaries, Europe: Voices of Women in Film, Screenability, and Australian Short Films. The festival was also held as a part of We Are One: A Global Film Festival, an international online film festival.

== Juries ==
The following were named as the festival juries:

=== Dendy Awards ===
- George Miller, Australian filmmaker
- Bryan Brown, Australian actor
- Sophie Hyde, Australian film producer

== Official selection ==
=== Documentary Australia Foundation Award ===
English title	Original title	Director(s)
Descent		Nays Baghai
A Hundred Years of Happiness		Jakeb Anhvu
The Leadership		Ili Baré
Morgana		Isabel Peppard, Josie Hess
Our Law		Cornel Ozies
The Plastic House		Allison Chhorn
Rosemary's Way		Ros Horin
The Skin of Others		Tom Murray
The Weather Diaries		Kathy Drayton
Women of Steel		Robynne Murphy

=== Europe: Voices of Women in Film ===
English title	Original title	Director(s)	Production country
Charter		Amanda Kernell	Sweden, Denmark, Norway
Force of Habit	Tottumiskysymys	Alli Haapasalo, Anna Paavilainen, Reetta Aalto, Jenni Toivoniemi, Kirsikka Saari, Elli Toivoniemi, Miia Tervo	Finland
Kids Run		Barbara Ott	Germany
Lessons of Love	Lekcja miłości	Malgorzata Goliszewska, Katarzyna Mateja	Poland
My Little Sister	Schwesterlein	Stéphanie Chuat, Véronique Reymond	Switzerland
A Perfectly Normal Family	En helt almindelig familie	Malou Reymann	Denmark
Sea Fever		Neasa Hardiman	Ireland, Sweden, Belgium, United Kingdom
They Call Me Babu	Ze noemen me Baboe	Sandra Beerends	Netherlands
A Year Full of Drama	Aasta täis draamat	Marta Pulk	Estonia
Zana		Antoneta Kastrati	Kosovo, Albania

== Awards ==
The following awards were presented at the festival:

- Documentary Australia Film Foundation Award for Best Australian Documentary

Descent by Nays Baghai

- Dendy Live Action Short Award

Idol by Alex Lu

- Rouben Mamoulian Award for Best Director in the Dendy Awards

Eliza Scanlen for Mukbang

- Yoram Gross Animation Award

GNT by Sara Hirner and Rosemary Vasquez-Brown
