= Portrait of a Zombie =

- Directed by: Bing Bailey
- Written by: Bing Bailey; Laura Morand Bailey
- Produced by: Bing Bailey; Laura Morand Bailey; Joseph Murphy
- Starring: Todd Fletcher; Patrick Murphy; Geraldine McAlinden; Rory Mullen
- Cinematography: Clayton H. Haskell
- Edited by: Bing Bailey
- Music by: Amanda Rose Smith
- Production company: Organ Hill Films
- Release date: 3 March 2012
- Running time: 85 minutes
- Country: Ireland
- Language: English

Portrait of a Zombie is a 2012 Irish horror film directed by Bing Bailey and written by Bailey and Laura Morand Bailey. It was released on March 3, 2012. Patrick Murphy plays a young man whose family decides to accept him when he turns into a zombie.

== Plot ==
During a zombie outbreak in Ireland, an American documentary film crew become interested in the story of a local Irish family who decide to keep their zombie-turned son a part of the family. When the film crew arrives in Ireland, they discover that the family's decision has angered their neighbors and a local crime boss. As tempers rise, the Americans document the controversy.

== Cast ==
- Todd Fletcher as American Filmmaker
- Patrick Murphy as Billy
- Geraldine McAlinden as Lizzy
- Rory Mullen as Danny
- Paul O'Bryan as Darren
- Sonya O'Donoghue as Louise

== Production ==
The film was originally more of a genre film, but budget constraints meant that director Bing Bailey needed to turn it into a hybrid of mockumentary and genre film. Bailey said that he wanted to "have his Evil Dead experience". Pre-production was done over the Internet, as Bailey was living in the United States at the time. Shooting took place in October 2009, May 2010, and May 2011; the additional shoots were due to a revamp of the initial concept that involved abandoned man-on-the-street interviews. Post-production took another 18 months.

== Release ==
Portrait of a Zombie premiered at the 2012 Cinequest Film Festival.

== Reception ==
Mark L. Miller of Ain't It Cool News called it "a mix of comedy, gore, drama, and action that works in ways few others have." Richard von Busack of Metro Silicon Valley wrote that the film "stands comparison to Shaun of the Dead itself."
