= Tim Travers and the Time Traveler's Paradox =

- Theatrical release poster
- Directed by: Stimson Snead
- Screenplay by: Stimson Snead
- Produced by: Kylie Walchuk; Casey Cowan; Rich Cowan
- Starring: Samuel Dunning; Danny Trejo; Joel McHale; Keith David; Felicia Day
- Cinematography: Bryan Gosline
- Edited by: J.D. McKee
- Music by: Si Begg; Damon Baxter
- Production companies: An Immortal; North by Northwest Productions; The Northwest Package
- Distributed by: Disrupt Entertainment
- Release dates: March 8, 2024 (Cinequest Film & Creativity Festival); May 30, 2025 (United States)
- Running time: 104 minutes
- Country: United States
- Language: English
- Box office: $2,725

Tim Travers and the Time Traveler's Paradox is a 2024 American science fiction comedy film written and directed by Stimson Snead. The feature film is an expansion of a short film of the same title created by Snead.

The film premiered at the Cinequest Film & Creativity Festival on March 8, 2024, and was released in the United States on May 30, 2025. It has received generally favorable reviews from critics.

== Premise ==
A self-absorbed scientific genius attempts to solve the time traveler's paradox by exploring what happens when he kills his past self.

== Cast ==
- Samuel Dunning as Tim Travers
- Danny Trejo as Royce
- Joel McHale as James Bunratty
- Keith David as The Simulator
- Felicia Day as Delilah

== Production ==
Tim Travers and the Time Traveler's Paradox was originally a 2022 short film written and directed by Stimson Snead and produced by North By Northwest. Snead was interested in the idea of time travel paradox but was dissatisfied with existing films that merely use time travel as a plot device rather than examining the idea of time travel itself, such as the reality of time travel and its practical and philosophical aspects. He had originally intended to play the time traveler himself as it was written from his perspective on time travel, but changed his mind when he met Samuel Dunning. Snead says, "I saw him in action and knew that this guy was Tim Travers. We made the short, and if he hadn’t been available for the feature, we wouldn’t have made it. He is Tim.” The short film has won awards in independent film festivals in 2022.

When funding for a different project failed to materialize at the last minute, Snead decided to turn the short film into a full feature because he already had the crew and shooting schedule arranged. Snead wrote the script in 30 days and brought back Samuel Dunning who played the time-traveler in the short. He worked with The Northwest Package production studio to shoot the film in Spokane, Washington. The film was supported by Washington Filmworks and it was shot in 16 days between November 30, 2022 and December 21, 2022.

Samuel Dunning, Danny Trejo, Joel McHale, Keith David, and Felicia Day were cast in the lead roles.

== Release ==
Tim Travers & The Time Traveler's Paradox premiered at the Cinequest Film & Creativity Festival in March 2024. The film was released in the United States by Disrupt Entertainment on May 30, 2025. It was a limited release to 4 theatres and it grossed $2,725 in three days. It was released on digital platforms on June 24, 2025 in the US, and January 26, 2026 in the UK.

== Reception ==
=== Critical reception ===
On the review aggregator website Rotten Tomatoes, 76% of 17 critics' reviews are positive.

Peter Bradshaw of The Guardian offered a critical review and gave the film two out of five stars, describing the film as "an exhausting indie romp on the subject of time travel" filled with "gibbering, jabbering nonsense" that "droned on and on", but it was rescued by cameos from Keith David who played God and Danny Trejo who played an assassin in the film. Ben Gibbons of Screen Rant on the other hand was positive and rated the film eight out of ten, calling the film "a stunning piece of work that is incredibly creative" and "something unique and delightful", with "standout performance" from Samuel Dunning as the time-traveler. Similarly positive was Burt Peterson of SciFiNow who awarded the film four out of five stars. praising it as "a gloriously abrasive piece of indie sci-fi" with "a sharp, joke-dense script" and thought it a "cult sci-fi in the making".

=== Awards ===
The film received several awards at FilmQuest including Best Screenplay and Best Actor, best comedy feature at Cinequest, and the Best Sci-Fi Feature Film at the International Horror and Sci-Fi Film Festival in 2024.
