= International Horror and Sci-Fi Film Festival =

Annual film festival in Arizona

- Location: Tempe, Arizona, United States
- Language: International
- Website: http://www.horrorscifi.com

International Horror and Sci-Fi Film Festival is a film festival dedicated to the genres of horror and science fiction. The event is held annually in Tempe, Arizona, United States. The festival was founded in 2005 by fans of horror and sci-fi films.

== 2005 festival awards ==
=== Hall of fame ===
- Tobe Hooper - The Texas Chain Saw Massacre, Poltergeist
- Lloyd Kaufman - The Toxic Avenger, Tromeo and Juliet

== 2006 festival awards ==
=== Hall of fame ===
- Mick Garris - The Stand, Masters of Horror

=== Sci-fi awards ===
- Best Science Fiction Feature - Firefly
- Best Director - Firefly
- Best Documentary - Pulp Fiction Art: Cheap Thrills and Painted Nightmares
- Best Animated Sci-Fi Feature - Robotech: The Shadow Chronicles
- Best Science Fiction Short Film - The Grandfather Paradox
- Best Science Fiction Animated Short - I Must Destroy You
- Best Alternate Reality Featurette - Assumption
- Best Surreal Short Film - Reality Check
- Best Science Fiction Musical - Alien Rose
- Best Alternate Reality Short - Outside In
- Best Science Fiction Tragedy - MICROGRAVITY
- Best Cinematography - Model Man
- Best Story in an SF Short Film - The Futurist
- Best Set Design - Adidas, Adi-color Green
- Best Surreal Future Short Film - Last Man in Brooklyn
- Best Fantasy Short Film - Say That You Love Me...

=== Horror awards ===
- Best Horror Feature - Unrest
- Best Actress - Corri English, Unrest
- Best Screenplay - In Memorium
- Best Splatter - The Slaughter
- Best Short - Penny Dreadful
- Best College Sound Design - Penny Dreadful
- Best Editing - Penny Dreadful
- Best Acting Ensemble - Death by Engagement
- Best Actress College Short - Emily Vacchiano, Penny Dreadful
- Creepiest Micro Short - No. 12
- Best Zombie Comedy - Zombies in Love
- Most Disturbing Short - Faceless
- Atomic Comics Fright Fest Award - Zomburrito
- Best Zombie Film - Recently Deceased
- Creepiest College Short - Watcher
- Best Foreign Short - Akai
- Goriest Micro Short - Deadly Tantrum
- Best Dark Future Drama - A through M
- Best Screenplay - A through M
- Best Dark Fantasy Short Film - Scribble
- Best Science Fiction Satire - Passion to the Max
- Best Dystopic Future Short Film - Bartholomew's Song
- Best Special Effects - Man vs. Woman
- Best Dark Future Foreign Film - Missing Pages
- Best Dark Future Short Film - The Salesman
- Best Superhero Short Film - Dial ‘A’ for Alphaman
- Best Accidental Apocalypse - Genesis Antipode
- Best Science Fiction Short Drama - NIA
- Best Black and White Science Fiction Short - 36
- Best Story in a Dark Future Short Film - Robots Are Blue
- Creepiest Short - Room to Breathe
- Micro Short Hall of Fame - Ghost Busted
- Best Micro-Short Cinematography - The Cobbler's Daughter
- Best Adaptation - Pit and the Pendulum
- Most Promising Filmmaker - Schattenkind
- Best Comedy/Horror, Micro Short - Movie Monster Insurance
- Best Documentary - Horror Fans
- Best Micro Short Zombie Film - Cannibal Grave Yard
- Best Sound Design, Foreign Short - Bad Dreams
- Creative Vision Award - Siniestro
- Goriest Short - Terrorist Ate My Brain
- Best Comedy/Horror - Zombie American
- Best Animated Short - If I Had a Hammer
- Best Cinematography, Foreign Short - Devilwood
- Best Costumes, Foreign Short - Devilwood
- Best High School Short - Snowmaniac
- Best Actress Horror Short - Lea Moreno, The Need
- IHSFF Alumni Award, Best Returning Filmmaker - The Resurrectionist
- Best Music - The Resurrectionist
- Best Short Screenplay - The Resurrectionist
- Best Short Cinematography - The Listening Dead
- Best Effects - The Listening Dead
- Best Production Design - The Listening Dead

== 2007 festival awards ==
- Best Horror Feature Film: Long Pigs
- Best Horror Short Film: Coming to Town
- Best Sci-Fi Feature Film: 11 Minutes Ago
- Best Sci-Fi Short Film: EPICAC
- Hall of Fame inductees:
  - Linda Blair
  - Ken Foree

== 2008 festival awards ==
- Best Horror Feature Film: Farmhouse
- Best Horror Short Film: Kirksdale
- Best Horror Screenplay: Alien Raiders
- Best Sci-Fi Feature Film: Ray Bradbury’s Chrysalis
- Best Sci-Fi Short Film: D-I-M, Deus in Machina
- Hall of Fame inductees:
  - Jeffrey Combs
  - Adrienne King

== 2009 festival awards ==
- Best Horror Feature Film: XII
- Best Horror Short Film: Jack The Reaper
- Best Horror Screenplay: Neighbor
- Best Sci-Fi Feature Film: Eyeborgs
- Best Sci-Fi Short Film: SchizoFredric
- Hall of Fame inductees:
  - Marilyn Burns
  - Judith O'Dea
  - Casper Van Dien

== 2010 festival awards ==
- Best Horror Feature Film: Rage
- Best Horror Short Film: The Furred Man
- Best Horror Screenplay: Ashes
- Best Sci-Fi Feature Film: Everything’s Eventual
- Best Sci-Fi Short Film: Cockpit: The Rule of Engagement
- Hall of Fame inductees:
  - Charles Cyphers
  - Lance Henriksen

== 2011 festival awards ==
- Best Horror Feature Film: Absentia
- Best Horror Short Film: Bugbaby
- Best Sci-Fi Feature Film: Triple Hit
- Best Sci-Fi Short Film: Picture Show at the End of the World
- Hall of Fame inductees:
  - Heather Langenkamp

== 2012 festival awards ==
- Best Horror Feature Film: It’s In The Blood
- Best Horror Short Film: Brutal Relax
- Best Sci-Fi Feature Film: Pig
- Best Sci-Fi Short Film: Secret Identity

== 2013 festival awards ==
- Best Horror Feature Film: Found
- Best Horror Short Film: Killer Kart
- Best Sci-Fi Feature Film: Channeling
- Best Sci-Fi Short Film: White Room: 02B3

== 2014 festival awards ==
- Best Horror Feature Film: Billy Club
- Best Horror Short Film: The Carriage or Dracula and My Mother
- Best Sci-Fi Feature Film: S.O.S.: Save Our Skins
- Best Sci-Fi Short Film: The Developer

== 2015 festival awards ==
- Best Horror Feature Film: Blood Punch
- Best Horror Short Film: Dead Hearts
- Best Sci-Fi Feature Film: Clew
- Best Sci-Fi Short Film: Air

== 2016 festival awards ==
- Best Horror Feature Film: Night of Something Strange
- Best Horror Short Film: Night of the Slasher
- Best Sci-Fi Feature Film: Parallel
- Best Sci-Fi Short Film: Helio

== 2017 festival awards ==
- Best Horror Feature Film: The Night Watchmen
- Best Horror Short Film: Wandering Soul
- Best Sci-Fi Feature Film: The Open
- Best Sci-Fi Short Film: Real Artists

== 2018 festival awards ==
- Best Horror Feature Film: The Evil Within
- Best Horror Short Film: Fisher Cove
- Best Sci-Fi Feature Film: Chimera
- Best Sci-Fi Short Film: Noro

== 2019 festival awards ==
- Best Horror Feature Film: My Soul to Keep
- Best Horror Short Film: Zombied
- Best Sci-Fi Feature Film: Last Sunrise
- Best Sci-Fi Short Film: The Way the Future Was

== 2020 festival awards ==
- Best Horror Feature Film: To Your Last Death
- Best Horror Short Film: Asking for a Friend
- Best Sci-Fi Feature Film: The Honeymoon Phase
- Best Sci-Fi Short Film: Secret Space

== 2021 festival awards ==
- Best Horror Feature Film: The Stairs
- Best Horror Short Film: The Relic
- Best Sci-Fi Feature Film: 12 Months of Kai
- Best Sci-Fi Short Film: Fearfully Made

== 2022 festival awards ==
- Best Horror Feature Film: CRABS!
- Best Horror Short Film: #NOFILTER
- Best Sci-Fi Feature Film: The Alternate
- Best Sci-Fi Short Film: Golem

== 2023 festival awards ==
- Best Horror Feature Film: Mind Body Spirit
- Best Horror Short Film: Madame Hattori’s Izakaya
- Best Sci-Fi Feature Film: Once Upon A Time in the Future: 2121
- Best Sci-Fi Short Film: That’s Our Time

== 2024 festival awards ==
- Best Horror Feature Film: Sheryl
- Best Horror Short Film: Wait For It
- Best Sci-Fi Feature Film: Tim Travers and the Time Travelers Paradox
- Best Sci-Fi Short Film: Lost in the Sky

== See also ==
- List of fantastic and horror film festivals
