= Cinequest Film & Creativity Festival =

Annual film festival held in San Jose, California, U.S.

- Location: San Jose and Mountain View, California, U.S.
- Founded: 1990
- Language: English
- Website: cinequest.org

The Cinequest Film & Creativity Festival is an annual American independent film festival held each March in San Jose, California and Mountain View, California. The international festival combines the cinematic arts with Silicon Valley’s innovation. It is produced by Cinequest, a not-for-profit 501(c)(3) organization that is also responsible for Picture The Possibilities and the distribution label Cinequest Mavericks Studio LLC. Cinequest awards the annual Maverick Spirit Awards.

In addition to over 130 world or U.S. premieres from over 30 countries, the festival hosts writer's events including screenwriting competitions, a shorts program, technology and artistic forums and workshops, student programs, and a silent film accompanied on the theatre organ. Founded in 1990 as the Cinequest Film Festival, the festival was rebranded in 2017 as the Cinequest Film & VR Festival and expanded beyond downtown San Jose to Redwood City. It took its present name in 2019.

== History ==
Film Producers and Entrepreneurs Halfdan Hussey and Kathleen Powell founded Cinequest in 1990. That year the festival showed 60 films in a single theater, the Camera 3 Cinemas in San Jose; 3,000 people attended. By 2013 there were over 100,000 attendees. In 2014 the festival showed 84 world premieres, by filmmakers from 43 countries, including one filmed using an iPhone.

The festival expanded to ten days in 2000, Cinequest Online was launched in 2004 and Cinequest Mavericks Studio in 2010. and in 2017 changed its name to the Cinequest Film & VR Festival, to reflect the major role of Silicon Valley in developing virtual reality. In 2019, the festival was rebranded as Cinequest Film & Creativity Festival and occurred March 5 – 17, 2019. That year it held events at the California Theatre, Hammer Theatre Center, Camera 3 Cinemas, Redwood City Century Downtown 20, and Fairmont Hotel.

In 2019, the festival was again renamed to the Cinequest Film & Creativity Festival in recognition of the many creative experiences presented each year including film, virtual and augmented realities, comedy, television, fashion, art and design, dance, and more. The 30th-anniversary 2020 festival, scheduled for March 3 – 15, 2020 in San Jose and Redwood City, has Elation as its theme; the second week was postponed to August because of the COVID-19 outbreak.

Cinequest Film Festival has gained a reputation as a discovery event: Chris Gore's Ultimate Film Festival Survival Guide recommends it as showing "the future of film". USA Today readers voted Cinequest as the best film festival.

== Awards ==
Cinequest offers several awards during the festival season. The Maverick Spirit Awards, the Maverick Innovator Awards, and the Media Legacy Awards highlight notable individuals in film and technology. The Maverick Individual awards are given to films at the conclusion of the festival via jury and audience voting.

=== Maverick Spirit Awards ===
The Maverick Spirit Award is given to influential individuals who embody the independent and innovative mindset. It is the most prestigious award given at the Cinequest Film Festival. Over the past 27 years, Cinequest has honored the following artists:

| Year | Honoree |
|---|---|
| 1990 | Jon Jost |
| 1992 | Lena Stolze |
| 1993 | Paul Bartel; Carl Franklin |
| 1994 | Russ Meyer; Werner Herzog; John Waters |
| 1996 | Luis Valdez |
| 1997 | Jennifer Jason Leigh |
| 1998 | Kevin Spacey; Elmer Bernstein; Jackie Chan; Walter Murch; John Schlesinger; Barry Sonnenfeld |
| 1999 | Gabriel Byrne; Rod Steiger |
| 2000 | Robert M. Young; Dario Argento; Alec Baldwin; Wes Craven; Peter Fonda |
| 2002 | Lalo Schifrin; David Strathairn; Lili Taylor; Ian McKellen |
| 2003 | Stephen Frears; Lupe Ontiveros; William H. Macy; Val Kilmer; James Woods |
| 2004 | Arnold Schwarzenegger; Kurt Miller |
| 2005 | Blanchard Ryan; Emmanuel Ofosu Yeboah; Ben Kingsley; Jon Polito |
| 2006 | Edward James Olmos |
| 2007 | Stewart Copeland; Minnie Driver; Christine Vachon; J. J. Abrams; Christopher McQuarrie |
| 2008 | Michael Keaton; Danny Glover |
| 2009 | Kevin Pollak; Louis Gossett Jr. Diablo Cody |
| 2010 | Benjamin Bratt; Deepak Chopra; Terry Zwigoff |
| 2011 | Bethany Hamilton; John Turturro; Alyson Stoner |
| 2012 | Terence Davies; Philip Kaufman; Elliott Gould |
| 2013 | Harrison Ford; Salman Rushdie; Chuck Palahniuk |
| 2014 | Neil Gaiman; Christopher Meloni |
| 2015 | John Boorman; Rosario Dawson |
| 2016 | Rita Moreno; James Franco |
| 2017 | Fred Armisen; Jane Lynch; Jason Reitman |
| 2018 | Nicolas Cage Tatiana Maslany Andie MacDowell |
| 2019 | Bill Nighy Elle Fanning Esther Wojcicki |
| 2020 | ruth weiss Hong Chau |
| 2022 | Jim Gaffigan Alison Brie |
| 2024 | Matthew Modine |
| 2025 | Gillian Anderson |
| 2026 | Vivica A. Fox Steve Zahn |

=== Maverick Innovator Awards ===
The Media Innovator Award honors technologists whose thoughts, methods and innovations have significantly advanced their industries, their careers, and the world. Cinequest has honored the following people:

| Year | Honoree |
|---|---|
| 2014 | Marty Cooper; Matthew Modine |

=== Media Legacy Awards ===
The Media Legacy Award, inaugurated in 2014, honors film journalists, "the champions who provide audiences and, thus, life blood for artists and films". Cinequest has honored the following people:

| Year | Honoree |
|---|---|
| 2014 | Kenneth Turan; Harry Knowles; Eric Kohn |
| 2015 | Anne Thompson; Richard von Busack |
| 2016 | Owen Gleiberman |
| 2018 | Ben Mankiewicz |

=== Film Awards ===
Several awards are given on the closing night of the festival to individual films selected either by a panel of judges or by audience surveys and votes. The most noteworthy awards are:

- Best Documentary Feature
- New Visions Award
- Best Short Narrative Film
- Audience Favorite Narrative - Awarded to the most popular narrative film based on audience surveys and screening attendance
- Audience Favorite Documentary - Awarded to the most popular documentary film based on audience surveys and screening attendance

Listed below are all of Cinequest's awards:

Maverick Film Competition

- Best Drama (Feature Film)
- Best Comedy (Feature Film)
- Best Documentary Feature
- Best Short Narrative
- Best Short Animation
- Best Short Documentary
- Best Student Short

New Visions Program

- New Visions Award (Feature Film)

Global Landscapes

- Global Vision Award (Feature Film)

Screenplay Competition

- Screenplay Award (1st, 2nd, and 3rd places recognized)

Audience Award

- Audience Award Narrative Feature
- Audience Award Documentary Feature
- Audience Award Short Film

Also awarded at Cinequest:

Kaiser Permanente Thrive Award

Kaiser Permanente Thrive Award - Awarded to the film that affirms the highest values of the human spirit and life

Virtual and Augmented Reality Awards

- Best Immersive
- Best VR Film
- Best AR Experience
- Best Game
- Best Mixed or Volumetric Reality

== Notable debuts ==
Independent films that premiered at Cinequest and went on to further distribution by a major movie studio:

| Year | Films |
|---|---|
| 2001 | Maze; The Adventures of Barry Ween |
| 2002 | Blue Car |
| 2003 | Hukkle; Robot Stories; Suckers; Spellbound |
| 2004 | I.P.O. The Agronomist; The Praying Mantis; One Man Show; The Story of the Weeping Camel; Imelda |
| 2005 | Accordion Tribe; The Civilization of Maxwell Bright |
| 2006 | Edmond; Water; Thank You for Smoking; Midnight Clear; The Hamiltons |
| 2007 | The Namesake; A Dog's Breakfast; Sublime; Blood Car; On the Doll; Monster Camp |
| 2008 | Dear Zachary; Sherman's Way; The Village Barbershop; The Sinking of Santa Isabel; The Art of Travel; Tokyo Sonata; El Camino; Critical Condition; Witch Hunt; Family Inc |
| 2009 | All About Dad; Billy Was a Deaf Kid; Blue Road; Heart of Stone; Historias Extraordinarias; The Nature of Existence; Rocaterrania; The Skeptic; Wake |
| 2010 | Anyone You Want; Cost of a Soul; The Desert of Forbidden Art; Gabi on the Roof in July; Hell is Other People; Kill the Habit; Krews; Peepers; Professor; The Real Revolutionaries; Tercer Mundo; To Whom It May Concern: Ka Shen's Journey; Invisible Strings: The Talented Pusker Sisters |
| 2011 | Mimesis; I'm Yours |
| 2012 | The Village Barbershop; The Sinking of Santa Isabel; Portrait of a Zombie; The Ghastly Love of Johnny X Forgetting the Girl; The Harsh Light of Day; Bel Borba Aqui; Jason Becker: Not Dead Yet |
| 2019 | Suburban Wildlife |
| 2020 | Before the Fire |
| 2021 | Range Roads |
| 2023 | Valley of Exile |
| 2024 | Tim Travers and the Time Traveler's Paradox |
| 2026 | Wardriver |

== Oscar nominees ==
Cinequest is a qualifying festival, with the Best Narrative Short and Best Animated Short both being eligible for an Academy Award. Short films shown at Cinequest that have received nominations for Academy Awards include:

| Year | Short Films |
|---|---|
| 2001 | Copy Shop Gregor's Greatest Invention |
| 2002 | Das Rad |
| 2003 | The Weather Underground |
| 2004 | (A) Torzija |
| 2005 | Ryan (Won); Little Terrorist |
| 2006 | Cashback; 9 The Mysterious Geographic Explorations of Jasper Morello; Our Time is Up Binta and the Great Idea |
| 2011 | The Fantastic Flying Books of Mr. Morris Lessmore (Won); Wild Life; Raju Time Freak |
| 2012 | Buzkashi Boys |
| 2013 | Room on the Broom |
| 2014 | Mr. Hublot (Won) |
| 2015 | Bear Story (Won) |
| 2016 | Pearl Stutterer (Won) |

Films shown at Cinequest that have received nominations for Academy Awards include:

| Year | Films |
|---|---|
| 2004 | The Story of the Weeping Camel |
| 2012 | The Girl with the Dragon Tattoo |
| 2013 | The Hunt |
| 2014 | Wild Tales Ida (Won) |
