= Buddha in Africa =

2019 South African documentary film

- Directed by: Nicole Schafer
- Screenplay by: Nicole Schafer
- Based on: Buddhism in Africa
- Produced by: Nicole Schafer
- Starring: Enock Alu
- Cinematography: Nicole Schafer
- Edited by: Nicole Schafer
- Release date: 27 April 2019
- Running time: 90 minutes
- Countries: South Africa; Sweden
- Languages: English; Chinese Mandarin

Buddha in Africa is a 2019 South African Swedish documentary film produced, written and directed by Nicole Schafer. The film follows the story of Enock Alu, a Malawian orphan from a rural village growing up between the contrasting African culture and the strict discipline of the Confucian, Buddhist value of system of the Chinese. It explores the impact of the growing influence of Chinese culture in Malawi following increasing trade relations between China and Africa in the past decade.

The principal photography of the film commenced in 2012 and had a delayed release in 2019. The film had its world premiere at Hot Docs Canadian International Film Festival in April 2019. It has since screened and won awards at numerous festivals around the world.

== Synopsis ==
Enock is six years old when he is taken to a Confucian Buddhist orphanage "Amitofo Care Center" and given the Chinese name Alu. He becomes extremely skilled in acrobatics. Suddenly he must make a choice to reunite with the culture of Africa or to sign up for five years in order to study in Taiwan.

== Production ==
After being pitched at the 2011 Durban International Film Festival, the film received the IDFA Most Promising Documentary Award. It then received international funding before being selected for the 2018 Cape Town International Film Festival Market Works-in-Progress laboratory.

== Release ==
The film had its world premiere at the 2019 Hot Docs Canadian International Documentary Festival. It then screened at several film festivals including Cambridge Film Festival, Encounters Festival South Africa and Sydney Film Festival.

Having won best South African documentary award at the Durban International Film Festival, the film was automatically nominated for an Academy Award.

== Reception ==
Andrew Parker from the blog The Gate praised the cinematography of the film but criticised the screenplay for its weak content.
