= Nicole Schafer =

South African filmmaker

- Born: 1980 (age 45–46)
- Education: University of Cape Town
- Occupations: film director, editor, producer, cinematographer
- Known for: Buddha in Africa

Nicole Schafer (born 1980) is a South African writer, film director, producer, editor and cinematographer. In 2019, her film Buddha in Africa was considered for an Oscar nomination.

== Career ==
Schafer completed her Master of Fine Arts (MFA) degree in film and television production at the University of Cape Town. Whilst studying, she was inspired by the work of film-makers such as Nick Broomfield, Chris Marker, D.A. Pennebaker, Jean Rouch and Dziga Vertov. The film she made as her thesis was called The Ballad of Rosalind Ballingall and was screened at the 2006 Frijbourg Film Festival.

Though Schafer was born in South Africa, she lived in Malawi for two years to pursue her career as a producer. She has produced award-winning stories for Reuters pan-African magazine Africa Journal while staying in Malawi. She has also worked as an editor for the South African-based sports channel Supersport. Her other production credits notably include Lonely Planet magazine owned travel show Six Degrees and Discovery Channel's Sport Traveller.

Schafer began producing the films under her production banner Thinking Strings Media. Thinking Strings is based in KwaZulu-Natal and aims to support the production of documentaries in the province. In 2011, her short film documentary Homage to the Buddha - of Africa (Namo Amitofo) was screened at International Film Festival Rotterdam. This was planned as a study for a longer work.

Schafer wrote, directed and produced her first feature film Buddha in Africa between 2012 and 2019. It is a documentary following a child growing up in a Buddhist Taiwanese orphanage in Malawi. The film won the award for best South African documentary film at Durban International Film Festival and was automatically qualified as an Oscar (Academy Award) nomination.

== Filmography ==
Year	Title	Notes	Ref
2026	Mama-Demic	Documentary	
2019	Buddha in Africa	Documentary	
