= Mīria George =

New Zealand poet and playwright

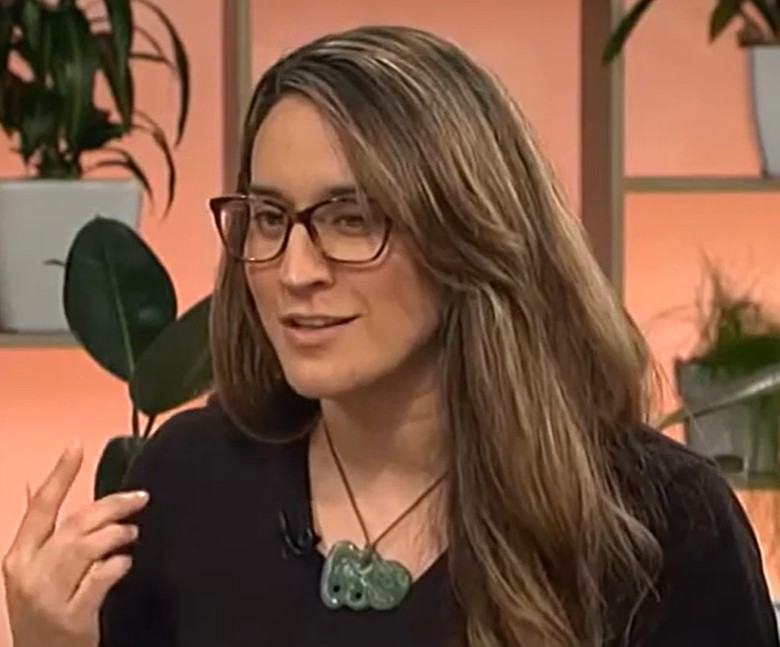
- George in 2017
- Born: 1980 (age 45–46)
- Known for: director
- Notable work: Vai (2019) Fire in the Water, Fire in the Sky (2021) Big Hair, Don't care (2022)
- Parent: Ian George (father) Kay George (stepmother)

Mīria George (born 1980) is a New Zealand writer, playwright, producer and director of Māori and Cook Islands descent. She authored award-winning stage plays and has written for radio and television as well as poetry. She was one of the film directors of the portmanteau film Vai. In November 2005, she won the Emerging Pacific Artist's Award at the Arts Pasifika Awards. Mīria George was the first Cook Islands artist to receive the Fulbright-Creative New Zealand Pacific Writer's Residency at the University of Hawai'i.

== Background ==
Mīria George was born Rotorua, New Zealand, her schooling took place in New Zealand, the Cook Islands and Costa Rica. Her heritage is Māori from Te Arawa and Ngāti Awa, and Cook Islands from Tumutevarovaro, Enua Manu, Ngāti Kuki ‘Ārani. Her father was Ian George, a well-known Cook Island visual artist, her stepmother is Kay George, also a notable artist herself.

She started writing in 2001 and in 2008 studied in a Masters in Creative Writing from Victoria University of Wellington's International Institute of Modern Letters. She lives in Wellington with her partner Hone Kouka who is also a New Zealand playwright and director. In 2004 they co-founded Tawata Productions and Tawata Press, an organisation that supports creative work from Pacific and Māori writers by producing festivals, workshops and tours of performances.

== Career ==
The work of Mīria George has toured New Zealand and internationally, including Canada, Hawai'i, Australia and the United Kingdom. In November 2005, she won the Emerging Pacific Artist's Award at the Arts Pasifika Awards, organised by Creative New Zealand, and two Chapman Tripp Theatre Awards for her first play, Ohe Ake. She is one of the people featured in the book Cook Island Heroes to inspire young Cook Islanders.

The political interrogation of the erosion of Māori rights, dignity, and humanity in a Pākehā-dominated New Zealand was forefront of George's best known plays called and what remains. It divided critics and audiences and created a lot of debate. It is regularly taught in schools, and is part of a movement in Māori theatre wider than marae-based traditional stories.

Her radio work includes writing episodes in Skinwriting for Radio New Zealand National.

In 2016 George received a three-month Fulbright-Creative New Zealand Pacific Writer's Residency at the University of Hawai'i. Her focus was to develop a new work called Fire In The Water, Fire In The Sky addressing effects of colonisation, Christianity and climate change in the Pacific.

In a review of her play Sunset Road, Theatre Scenes noted "(the play) weaves history and imagination, to tell a story inspired by George’s whanau. The journey from Areora, Atiu, Cook Islands to 76 Sunset Road, Rotorua is beautifully re-told through the somewhat innocent eyes of the twins Lucia and Luka... they give consistently magnificent performances, both in an out of the spotlight".

As co-director of Tawata Productions, George has been part of producing many events in the landscape of New Zealand theatre. This includes the annual Kia Mau Festival founded in 2015 and Breaking Ground founded in 2010 (previously known as the Matariki Development Festival), an international Indigenous playwrights' festival. In 2017 as part of the Kia Mau Festival, 160 indigenous artists and practitioners took part. George won the Bruce Mason Playwriting Award in 2017.

In the book Floating Islanders: Pasifika Theatre in Aotearoa it states, "George has played a prominent role in bringing the politics of Māori and Pasifika issues to the stage."

== Bibliography ==
=== Plays ===
- Ohe Ake, The Awakening (play) (2004)
- And What Remains (play) (2006)
- He Reo Aroha (play), co-written with Jamie McCaskill (2010)
- Urban Hymns (play) (2009)
- Sunset Road (play) (2012)
- The Vultures (play) (2016)

=== Poetry ===
- The Wet Season (poetry), Wai-te-ata Press

=== Film ===
- Vai (2019) director, writer. Vai is portmanteau feature film made by nine female Pacific filmmakers, filmed in seven different Pacific countries: Fiji, Tonga, Solomon Islands, Kuki Airani (Cook Islands), Samoa, Niue and Aotearoa (New Zealand).
- fire in the water, fire in the sky (2021) director, writer. fire in the water, fire in the sky is a short film, filmed on Matiu Island in Aotearoa (New Zealand).
