= Ghosthunter (film) =

2018 documentary film

- Directed by: Ben Lawrence
- Written by: Ben Lawrence
- Produced by: Rebecca Bennett
- Starring: Jason King
- Cinematography: Hugh Miller
- Edited by: Karen Johnson
- Music by: Rafael May
- Release date: 2018
- Running time: 96 minutes
- Country: Australia
- Language: English

Ghosthunter is a 2018 Australian documentary created by Ben Lawrence. It is about Jason King, a security guard and ghost hunter, who is searching for his absent father.

== Reception ==
On review aggregator Rotten Tomatoes, the film has an approval rating of 100% based on 7 reviews.

The Sydney Morning Herald's Paul Byrnes gave it 4 1/2 stars saying "Lawrence spent seven years on this project. It's a breathtaking achievement, but the credit goes to those in front of the lens, as much as those behind it. They all display such courage, such resilience." The Herald Sun's Leigh Paatsch gave it 4 stars. He states "Considering some of the devastating revelations that come to light and the obvious impact they have on those participating in the documentary, the sensitivity and care shown by the filmmaker highlights him as a major talent to watch out for in the future."

== Awards ==
- 8th AACTA Awards
  - Best Editing in a Documentary - Karen Johnson - won
  - Best Feature Length Documentary - Ben Lawrence, Rebecca Bennett - nominated
  - Best Original Music Score in a Documentary - Rafael May - nominated
  - Best Cinematography in a Documentary - Hugh Miller - nominated
