= Ray Bradbury's Chrysalis =

- Directed by: Tony Báez Milán
- Written by: Ray Bradbury (short story), Roger Lay, Jr., Tony Báez Milán (Screen story / screenplay)
- Produced by: Roger Lay, Jr.
- Starring: John Klemantaski, Darren Kendrick, Corey Landis, Glen Vaughan, Larry Dirk, Danny Cameron, Elina Madison, Liesel Kopp
- Cinematography: Gabriel C. Diniz
- Edited by: Cheyenne Pesko
- Music by: Brandon Moore
- Production company: Urban Archipelago Films
- Distributed by: Lightning Entertainment (U.S.), Arsenal Pictures (International)
- Release date: 2008
- Running time: 90 minutes
- Country: United States
- Language: English

Ray Bradbury's Chrysalis is a 2008 film based on a short story by Ray Bradbury and produced by Roger Lay Jr. The film tells the tale of mankind's struggle for survival in a distant future after the effects of war and carelessness have completely ravaged the environment.

The story takes place inside an underground research facility where a group of scientists look for ways to sustain life. When one of the scientist falls ill and a chrysalis forms around him, a tug of war ensues about the future of the stricken scientist... and ultimately the fate of the Earth.

== Production ==
During pre-production Bradbury was consulted on every element of the film, from script to conceptual art and storyboards. Principal photography began on November 23, 2007 in Los Angeles, California.

Principal photography on the film took place on multiple sets at the Burbank Production Stages where a completely connected and functional environment recreating an underground research facility was built. Each set was connected through a series of hallways and passageways allowing the crew to shoot continuously without revealing any set backings or lights. Everything was built-in allowing the film crew to follow the characters on camera from one part of the facility to another without ever having to cut.

The filmmakers decided to go for a look that pays tribute to the science fiction films of the genre’s golden age. For that same reason it was decided to build everything physically and limit the use of computer generated effects. The film does feature special creature effects by Romaire Studios, the FX facility founded by Emmy Awards winner Lee Romaire. Additional work was done on the FX stage at Vlaze Media Networks in Los Angeles where multiple news segments and emergency broadcasts where shot in order to composite into monitors on the research facility set.

Second unit photography was completed at the El Mirage dry lake bed in California, and the rainforest of El Yunque in Puerto Rico where the film’s breathtaking finale was shot at 3,800 feet above sea level on one of the rainforest’s highest peaks.

The film features an orchestral score by composer Brandon Moore, which was recorded in Los Angeles using a live orchestra combined with electronic sounds, performed on synths by the composer, to heighten the film’s chilling undertone.

The film was first previewed in Wired magazine's November 2008 issue, and premiered at San Diego Comic-Con on July 26, 2008, when Ray Bradbury introduced the clip to a crowd of 5,000 fans.

The film premiered in November 2008 in Los Angeles during the Shriekfest Film Festival. Ray Bradbury was present at one of the screenings and spoke to the crowd after the film played.

== Release ==
Lightning Entertainment picked up Urban Archipelago Films' production of Ray Bradbury’s Chrysalis for domestic distribution. The film premiered November 17, 2009, via On Demand through the Time Warner, Charter, and Bright House digital cable providers.

Ray Bradbury’s Chrysalis was picked up for international distribution by Arsenal Pictures and will begin airing worldwide in the fall of 2009. Some of the initial international territories include Russia and Japan—two of the largest non-U.S. markets for Bradbury's work.

=== Home media ===
The film was released on DVD on July 27, 2010 and distributed by E-1 Entertainment.

== Festivals and awards ==
The film has been screened at multiple film festivals and has also won a best feature film award.

- 2008 – WINNER – Best Sci-Fi Feature - International Horror and Sci-Fi Film Festival, Phoenix AZ
- 2008 - Official Selection - Shriekfest Film Festival, Los Angeles CA
- 2008 – Official Selection – Scienceplusfiction Film Festival, Italy
- 2008 – Official Selection – Phoenix Comic Con Film Festival, Phoenix AZ
- 2009 – Official Selection - Boston Science Fiction Film Festival, Boston MA
- 2009 – Screening – Cannes Film Market, France
- 2009 - Screening - Fencon Sci-Fi Convention, Dallas TX
- 2009 - MIPCOM, France
- 2009 - Official Selection - Cinefantasy Film Festival, Brazil
- 2009 - LOSCON
