= RocKabul =

- Directed by: Travis Beard
- Produced by: Travis Beard; Bridget Callow-Wright; Brooke Tia Silcox
- Starring: District Unknown
- Edited by: Travis Beard; Craig Goode; Redzinald Simek
- Music by: Jason Beard
- Production companies: Rockabul Pty Ltd; TigerNest Films; No Thing Productions
- Distributed by: Rockabul Pty Ltd; Potential Films (Australia)
- Release date: February 1, 2018 (International Film Festival Rotterdam)
- Running time: 86 minutes
- Countries: Afghanistan, Australia
- Language: English

RocKabul is a documentary film that was produced between 2009 and 2016 in Afghanistan by Australian filmmaker Travis Beard. The film had its world premiere at the 2018 Rotterdam International Film Festival. It has been featured in over 40 film festivals, and had a limited cinema release within Australia in 2019. Bill Gould from the American alternative metal band Faith No More is an Executive Producer on the film and describes it as “A coming of age documentary which deals with youth identity and freedom of expression”

== Critical reception ==
The film was generally very well-received critically. As of 17 January 2020 it has an overall rating of 7.7/10 on review aggregator website IMDB.com. The Australian website The Curb described it as "A respectful, powerful, entertaining, informative, engaging documentary that kicks ass."

RocKabul has been featured in some of the biggest music magazines such as Rolling Stone, Metal Hammer, and Kerrang.

== Funding ==
The film was funded by the US State Dept under the Public Diplomacy Grant Initiative at the US Embassy in Kabul and Screen Australia.

== District Unknown ==
One of the bands heavily featured in the film is District Unknown, a psychedelic metal band formed in Kabul in 2009 and taught by Beard. The group originally performed in disguises and remained anonymous due to threats from the Taliban.

After the events of the film, District Unknown broke up with two members, Sulleiman Omar and Yousef Shah, relocating to the United States and United Kingdom, respectively. The duo formed a new project Afreet and continue recording under that name.

== Festivals ==
RocKabul had its world premiere at the 2018 Rotterdam International Film Festival and its Australian premiere at Sydney Film Festival.

- Arizona Film Festival - US Premiere - Winner 'Best Music Documentary'
- Sharm El Sheik International Film Festival - Egypt
- Diorama Film Festival - India
- Heildelberg International Film Festival- Germany
- Rokumentti - Finland
- Braunschweig International Film Festival - Germany
- Doc n Roll - UK Premiere
- Verona Film Festival -Italy
- 34th Warsaw Film Festival - Poland Premiere
- Slash Film Festival- Vienna - Austrian Premiere
- African Premiere - Festival Wave Rock Weekender Festival - Western Australia
- Off Cinema- Lago dei Cigni - Florence, Italy
- Soundtrack Festival- Cologne - Germany Premiere
- Bucheon International Fantastic Film Festival - Asian PREMIERE
- Revelation International Film Festival -Perth Australia
- River film Festival, Padua, Italy
- NordicDocs, Trondheim, Norway
- Dokfest, Volda, Norway
- Reykjavik Deathfest, Iceland
- Cinemateket Film Festival, Trondheim, Norway
- Middle East Now Film Festival, Florence, Italy
- Titanic International Film Festival, Budapest, Hungary
- Inferno Extreme Metal Festival, Oslo, Norway
- Weesp Refugee Film Festival, Netherlands
- Kosmorama Festival- Trondheim, Norway
