= Suburban Wildlife =

- Official Release Poster
- Directed by: Imogen McCluskey
- Written by: Béatrice Barbeau-Scurla Imogen McCluskey
- Produced by: Béatrice Barbeau-Scurla; Imogen McCluskey; Sophie Hattch
- Starring: Maddy McWilliam; Hannah Lehmann; Priscilla Doueihy; Alex King
- Cinematography: Lucca Barone-Peters
- Edited by: Sophie Hattch; Adam Sheen
- Music by: Isha Ram Das
- Production companies: Fat Salmon; Take Two Productions
- Distributed by: Gravitas Ventures
- Release dates: 9 March 2019 (Cinequest); 8 June 2019 (Australia)
- Running time: 85 minutes
- Country: Australia
- Language: English
- Budget: A$4,000

Suburban Wildlife is a 2019 Australian independent coming-of-age drama film directed by Imogen McCluskey in her feature film debut. It was written by McCluskey and Béatrice Barbeau-Scurla. The film stars Maddy McWilliam, Hannah Lehmann, Priscilla Doueihy, and Alex King. It had its world premiere on 9 March 2019 at the Cinequest Film Festival in California.

== Plot ==
Nina, Louise and Alice are recent university graduates living in Sydney. They celebrate their graduation with Kane, their high school friend who didn't attend university. The mood is dampened as the group struggles to come to terms with Louise's impending move to London for two years. Louise convinces the others to join her on a road trip into regional New South Wales before she leaves. Tensions continue to rise as the friends question what their relationships will be like after Louise moves away.

== Cast ==
- Maddie McWilliam as Nina
- Hannah Lehmann as Louise
- Priscilla Doueihy as Alice
- Alex King as Kane
- Adrian Giribon as Ravi
- Madeleine Jurd as Phoebe
- Emily Havea as Aleea
- Daniela Haddad as Flora
- Adam Kovarik as Dylan
- Divya Vaman as Shivani

== Production ==
McCluskey and co-writer-producer Béatrice Barbeau-Scurla were students at AFTRS when they started work on the film, and used the school's equipment for the first stages. Suburban Wildlife's production budget of A$4,000 was raised through crowdfunding efforts. Shooting took place over 14 days in Sydney, with post-production (involving two production companies) taking another 18 months. The four main actors – Maddy McWilliam, Hannah Lehmann, Priscilla Doueihy and Alex King – were unknowns and inexperienced. Principal photography took place in February 2017 and lasted fourteen days.

Cinematographer Lucca Barone-Peters is a close collaborator and friend of director McCluskey.

== Release ==
Suburban Wildlife had its world premiere at the Cinequest Film Festival on 9 March 2019. It later had its Australian premiere at the Sydney Film Festival on 8 June 2019. In 2020, US film distributor Gravitas Ventures picked up the film for digital distribution. It became available internationally for video-on-demand rental on 1 December 2020.

== Reception ==
The Curb gave the film a good review, saying "Suburban Wildlife is low-fi storytelling delivered by knowing storytellers. Nina, Louise, Alice, and Kane, are inhabited characters who are real and lived in...", and posits "Maybe this is a new wave of Australian film – the Sydney millennial angst genre".

Blake Howard of Graffiti with Punctuation writes "The moment that you realise you're watching something with key generational insight is as Priscilla Doueihy's Alice delivers a despondent thought about travelling the world to be enriched..." and concludes that the film "may be a debut, but it’s one filled with promise; plying great craft while dwelling in the frustrations and the potentially disastrous actions of the directionless"

== Awards and nominations ==
- Debut Director Award, London Australian Film Festival
- Runner-up, Audience Award, Sydney Film Festival
