= A Mother Brings Her Son to Be Shot =

- Directed by: Sinéad O'Shea
- Written by: Sinéad O'Shea
- Produced by: Sinéad O'Shea and Ailish Bracken
- Music by: George Brennan
- Distributed by: CAT&Docs
- Release dates: October 13, 2017 (London Film Festival); September 14, 2018
- Running time: 84 minutes
- Country: Ireland
- Language: English

A Mother Brings Her Son to Be Shot is a 2017 documentary film written and directed by Sinéad O'Shea. Filmed over a period of five years, it tells the story of the O'Donnell family in Derry. Their older son Philly had received a punishment shooting from a paramilitary group. His mother had helped organise it to prevent a worse fate happening to him. The film explores the effects and ramifications of this, along with the sociopolitical background of The Troubles in Ireland, which, however, officially ended in 1998, and how communities remain affected after the Good Friday Agreement.

== Synopsis ==
The film mostly takes place in Creggan, a housing estate in Derry. Filming began in 2012, after Philly O'Donnell had received a punishment shooting, allegedly for drug dealing. The family is part of a dissident community where paramilitary offshoots of the IRA are active, police and governmental help is rejected, and problems are "dealt with" from within. It opens with Kevin Barry, Philly's younger brother, showing off an array of weaponry and describing how they would be used. Philly is "banished" from Derry and briefly lives in Belfast, before returning to his mother's home despite growing death threats against him.

The film also covers Hugh Brady, a former paramilitary member who now acts as an intermediary between families and paramilitaries to try to resolve conflicts without violence. Brady attempts to negotiate for Philly's safety in Creggan, and also arranges for O'Shea to meet some active paramilitary members.

Over the course of the film Kevin Barry becomes more disruptive at school, and eventually drops out. Brady says "a fright" may scare him straight; Kevin Barry responds that men with AK-47s at his door at the age of 9 were fright enough.

The film closes with Philly O'Donnell senior returning from prison. In their final interview Majella, the mother, describes it as a "good year" for the family, as they've been reunited with each other and Philly junior has settled down with his partner and has a baby on the way. However, captions at the film's closing reveal that Philly senior received a punishment shooting several weeks after the end of filming, and notes that more people have committed suicide after the Troubles than died during the fighting over the same period.

== Reception ==
The film premiered in the UK on October 13, 2017 at the London Film Festival, and has gone on to be shown at film festivals around the world. The Guardian described it as a "stark look at the violent, self-policing community that rules Creggan" and "a good story", but noted "there’s never the sense that she has a real stake in this community as the tone of the reportage wavers between personal and journalistic." The Hollywood Reporter said the film would "open eyes for Stateside viewers who'd like to believe the Troubles ended two decades ago with the Good Friday Agreement", also noting there was "room for improvement".
