= Wieża. Jasny dzień =

2017 Polish film by Jagoda Szelc

- Directed by: Jagoda Szelc
- Written by: Jagoda Szelc
- Produced by: Marcin Malatyński
- Starring: Anna Krotoska; Małgorzata Szczerbowska; Anna Zubrzycka; Dorota Łukasiewicz-Kwietniewska; Rafał Kwietniewski
- Cinematography: Przemysław Brynkiewicz
- Edited by: Anna Garncarczyk
- Music by: Teoniki Rożynek
- Production company: Indeks Studio
- Distributed by: Against Gravity
- Release dates: September 19, 2017 (Gdynia Film Festival); March 23, 2018 (Poland)
- Running time: 106 minutes
- Country: Poland
- Language: Polish
- Budget: 2.3 million PLN

Wieża. Jasny dzień (English: Tower. A Bright Day) is a Polish drama film from 2017, directed by Jagoda Szelc, based on her original screenplay.

The film revolves around the clash between the traditionalist Mula and her sister Kaja, who compete for the right to raise Nina, Kaja's biological daughter. Szelc received awards for her directorial debut and screenplay at the Gdynia Film Festival and was honored with the Polityka Passport. Reviewers of the film repeatedly emphasized its references to the tradition of Polish Romanticism and the work of European filmmakers such as Lars von Trier and Yorgos Lanthimos.

== Plot ==
On the occasion of Nina's First Communion, her parents, Mula and Michał, invite their family to their home in the Kłodzko Valley. Soon, Mula's siblings join them – her sister Kaja and brother Andrzej with his wife Anna and children. It turns out that Kaja is Nina's biological mother, who disappeared for several years after giving birth to the child, and Nina was raised by Mula, who also takes care of their sick mother. Mula, who is busy with various responsibilities, harbors resentment towards her sister and fears that her presence might disrupt her relationship with Nina. Upon the arrival of the guests, a series of irrational events unfolds – the sisters' mother regains her health, and Nina refuses to participate in her communion.

== Cast ==
- Anna Krotoska – Mula
- Małgorzata Szczerbowska – Kaja, Mula's sister
- Anna Zubrzycka – Ada, mother of Mula, Kaja and Andrzej
- Dorota Łukasiewicz-Kwietniewska – Anna, Andrzej's wife
- Rafał Kwietniewski – Andrzej, Mula's brother
- Rafał Cieluch – Michał, Mula's husband
- Laila Hennessy – Nina
- Ida Kwietniewska – Dusia, Anna and Andrzej's daughter
- Igor Kwietniewski – Igor, Anna and Andrzej's son
- Artur Krajewski – priest
- Bogusława Sztencel – Miss Wanda
- Mohammed Almughanni – refugee
- Jędrzej Wielecki – pilgrim
- Miłosz Karbownik – pilgrim
- Mikołaj Chroboczek – pilgrim
- Maciej Miszczak – pilgrim
- Monika Strzelczyk – woman
- Hanna Misiak – woman
- Joanna Nowicka-Zagrajek – woman
- Joanna Łużny – woman
- Arkadiusz Zagrajek – man
- Alicja Pachowicz – fair-haired girl

== Production ==
The production of the film was managed by the Indeks Studio, established by the then rector of the Łódź Film School, Mariusz Grzegorzek. The creation of the studio aimed to assist future graduates of the school in making non-commercial, original debuts. One of the students of the Łódź Film School who benefited from this initiative was Jagoda Szelc. When creating her feature debut, Szelc intended Wieża. Jasny dzień to be a protest song against the destructive ambitions of humanity:

On a micro scale, it tells the story of a family crisis, but on a macro scale, it's a story about the obsession with control: the daily pursuit, perceiving ambition as a positive value, and the belief that love can be owned. This set of features is something that stands in direct opposition to our nature; it's like a denial of the primal attitude of 'let it go'.

For the film, Szelc planned to adopt a naturalistic style, so she decided to forgo professional actors: I wanted them to be people who were somewhat unknown but very credible. Therefore, in the lead roles, non-professional actors Anna Krotoska and Małgorzata Szczerbowska were cast, attracted by Szelc's working method. Krotoska described her participation in the film as the most beautiful work I've done so far.

The cinematography for Wieża. Jasny dzień was handled by Przemysław Brynkiewicz. The shooting period began on 23 May 2016, in the Kłodzko Valley. The total budget of the film was around 2.3 million PLN, with almost 1.5 million PLN covered by the Polish Film Institute. The film was completed in 2017 after editing by Anna Garncarczyk and was then entered into festival circulation. It was first presented at the Gdynia Film Festival on 19 September 2017. The theatrical premiere of Wieża. Jasny dzień took place on 23 March 2018.

== Reception ==
=== Cinematic attendance ===
Domestic cinemas reported low audience attendance at screenings of the film. According to estimates by the Polish Film Institute, it was seen by just over 23,000 viewers.

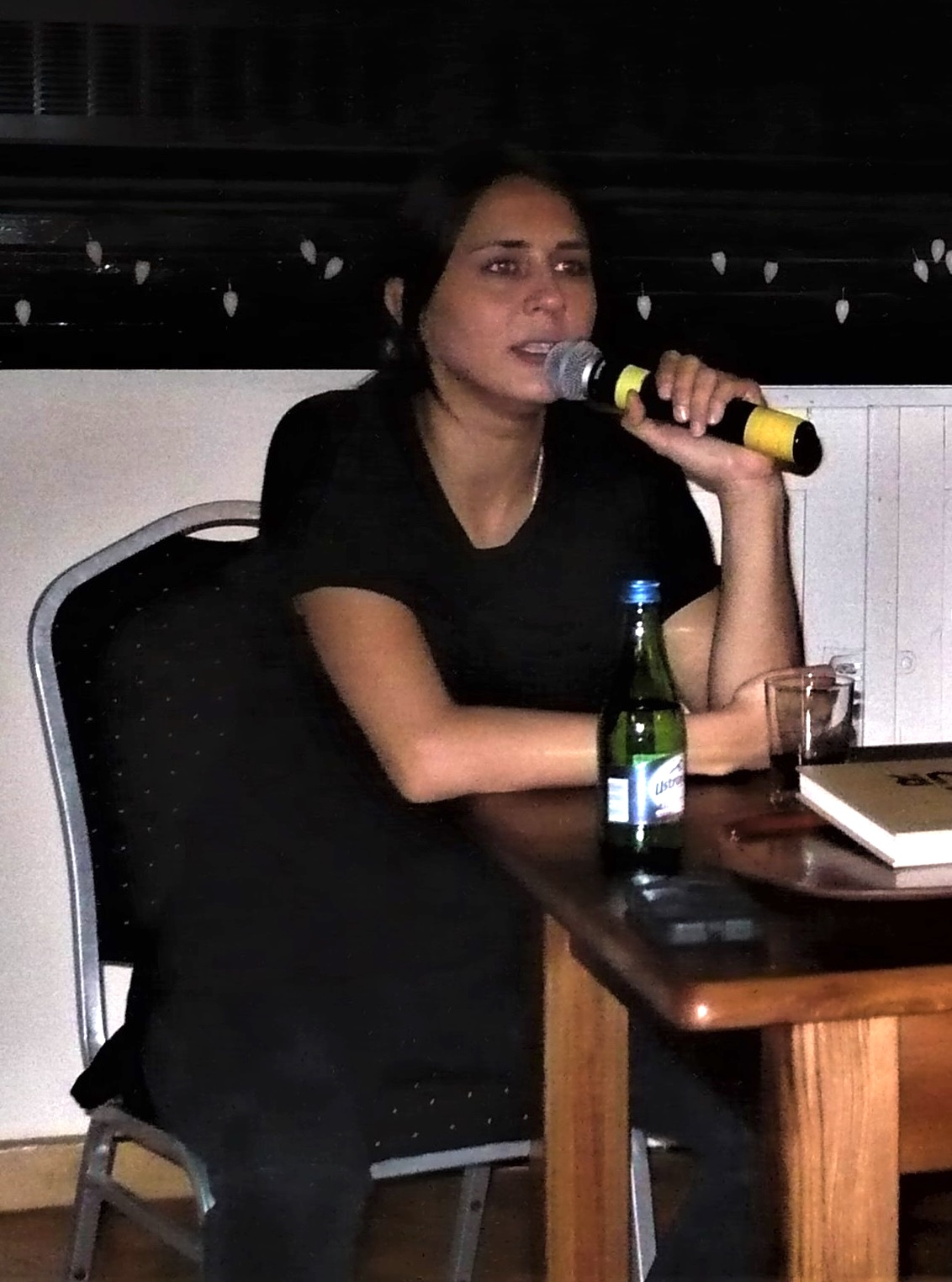
Jagoda Szelc, director of the film (2018)

=== Critical reception in Poland ===
The film was generally well received by critics. Jakub Popielecki from the Filmweb portal argued that Szelc embarks on a tale about the human condition. The horror here is primarily the horror of existence, the tragedy of an uncomfortable sprawl in which humanity finds itself. Popielecki drew comparisons between Wieża. Jasny dzień and Lars von Trier's Antichrist as well as the cinema of Mariusz Grzegorzek. Łukasz Maciejewski claimed that Szelc's film would appeal to Maria Janion thanks to its constant references to Polish Romanticism, although he also noticed allusions to films by Yorgos Lanthimos and the ancient Greek myth of Medea. Grzegorz Fortuna Jr. in Kino magazine elaborated on a romantic interpretation, stating that Jagoda Szelc reaches into the vast closet of Slavic folklore and brings back the forgotten figure of the 'szeptucha', who is not a negative and hostile character, but an ambivalent and fleeting one. Fortuna also argued that in Wieża. Jasny dzień the apocalypse is not associated [...] with a revolt of machines, nuclear explosions, and ubiquitous radioactive dust, but with a return to shamanism; to something primitive, mysterious, pushed out of collective consciousness.

Piotr Mirski in his review for Dwutygodnik considered Jagoda Szelc's film to be the antithesis of Krzysztof Skonieczny's Hardkor Disko: While 'Hardkor Disko' is merely a collage of bombastic slogans, clichés, and flashy gimmicks, 'Wieża. Jasny dzień' can serve as a model of young, radical artistic cinema. Jarosław Kowal from the Film.org.pl portal appreciated the maturity of Szelc's debut and argued that Wieża. Jasny dzień is a film on the border of many genres: Szelc transcends genres, on the border between the real world and metaphysics, but instead of fueling conflict, she simply observes their existence, and certainly does not anoint one as better than the other.

Łukasz Adamski from wPolityce.pl pointed out the problematic message of Wieża. Jasny dzień: Not only stylistically is this cinema intended for a narrow audience, but its message is also very disturbing. In his opinion, the film suggests that contemporary, secularized Poles, faced with the absence of God, are left with dense forests and paying homage to another deity. According to Adrian Luzar from the Interia portal, Jagoda Szelc's film is characterized by a disordered, somewhat crippled style, colliding overly zealous, documentary realism with scenes reminiscent of Xavier Dolan's films.

=== Critical reception abroad ===
Wieża. Jasny dzień also caught the attention of foreign critics. Sarah Ward from the British magazine Screen selected Jagoda Szelc's film as one of the ten female-directed works to watch in 2018. However, Neil Young from Hollywood Reporter gave a negative assessment of Wieża. Jasny dzień, stating that although there are glimmers of talent on various fronts in the film, ultimately it is a hollow rehash of well-worn stylistic tropes. Ben Sachs from Chicago Reader compared Szelc's debut to other female-directed works such as Lucrecia Martel's La Ciénaga (2001) and Alice Rohrwacher's The Wonders (2014), but noted that with Jagoda Szelc, there is a lack of humor and compassion that characterizes other films. Szelc's perspective is so pessimistic and dark that one often feels like it's a horror film, and the overwhelmingly eerie music and sound effects reinforce this association.

== Awards ==
Year	Festival/organizer	Award	Recipient	Result
2017	Gdynia Film Festival	Award for directorial debut or second film	Jagoda Szelc	Winner
2017	Gdynia Film Festival	Screenplay award	Jagoda Szelc	Winner
2017	Gdynia Film Festival	Onet's "Discovery of the Festival" award	Jagoda Szelc	Winner
2017	Tadeusz Szymków Film Acting Festival	Golden Puppy for supporting female actor	Małgorzata Szczerbowska	Winner
2018	Polityka magazine	Polityka's Passport	Jagoda Szelc	Winner
2018	International Festival of Independent Cinema Off Camera	Kraków Film Award in the Main Competition "Making Way"		Winner
2018	Polish Film Festival FilmPoland in Berlin	Jury Award		Winner
2018	Koszalin Film Debut Festival The Young and Film	Screenplay award	Jagoda Szelc	Winner
2018	Mammoth Lakes Film Festival	Main Award		Winner
2018	Festival KinoPolska in Paris	Special Mention		Winner
2019	Polish Film Academy	Eagle for discovery of the year	Jagoda Szelc	Nomination
2019	Łódź Film School	Andrzej Munk Award	Jagoda Szelc	Winner
