= Ben Lawrence (director) =

Australian film director

Ben Lawrence is an Australian photographer and director of TV commercials and feature films. He is the son of Australian film maker Ray Lawrence.

Ben Lawrence was born in London. In 2006 he was a recipient of the Association of Independent Commercial Producers award for "international excellence."

In 2008 & 2009 he was nominated for an Australian Directors Guild award in the Best Direction of a Television Commercial category and was also recipient of the inaugural ADG, GRASS award.

In 2018 Lawrence's documentary, Ghosthunter, premiered at the Sydney Film Festival, the same year he directed the film, Hearts and Bones.

Lawrence's documentary Ithaka debuted at the Sydney Film Festival in November 2021. It is a feature documentary that follows John Shipton's battle to save his son, Julian Assange. It was filmed over two years in Europe and the UK and contains original music by Brian Eno.

Lawrence won Best Documentary - Public Broadcast or Exhibition for his documentary Ithaka at the AWGIE Awards 2022.
