= 2020 Cannes Film Festival =

- Special poster of the 73rd Cannes Film Festival featuring date of limited screenings in late October 2020
- Location: Cannes, France
- Founded: 1946
- Awards: Short Film Palme d'Or: I Am Afraid to Forget Your Face
- Website: festival-cannes.com/en

Cannes Film Festival
- 2021 2019

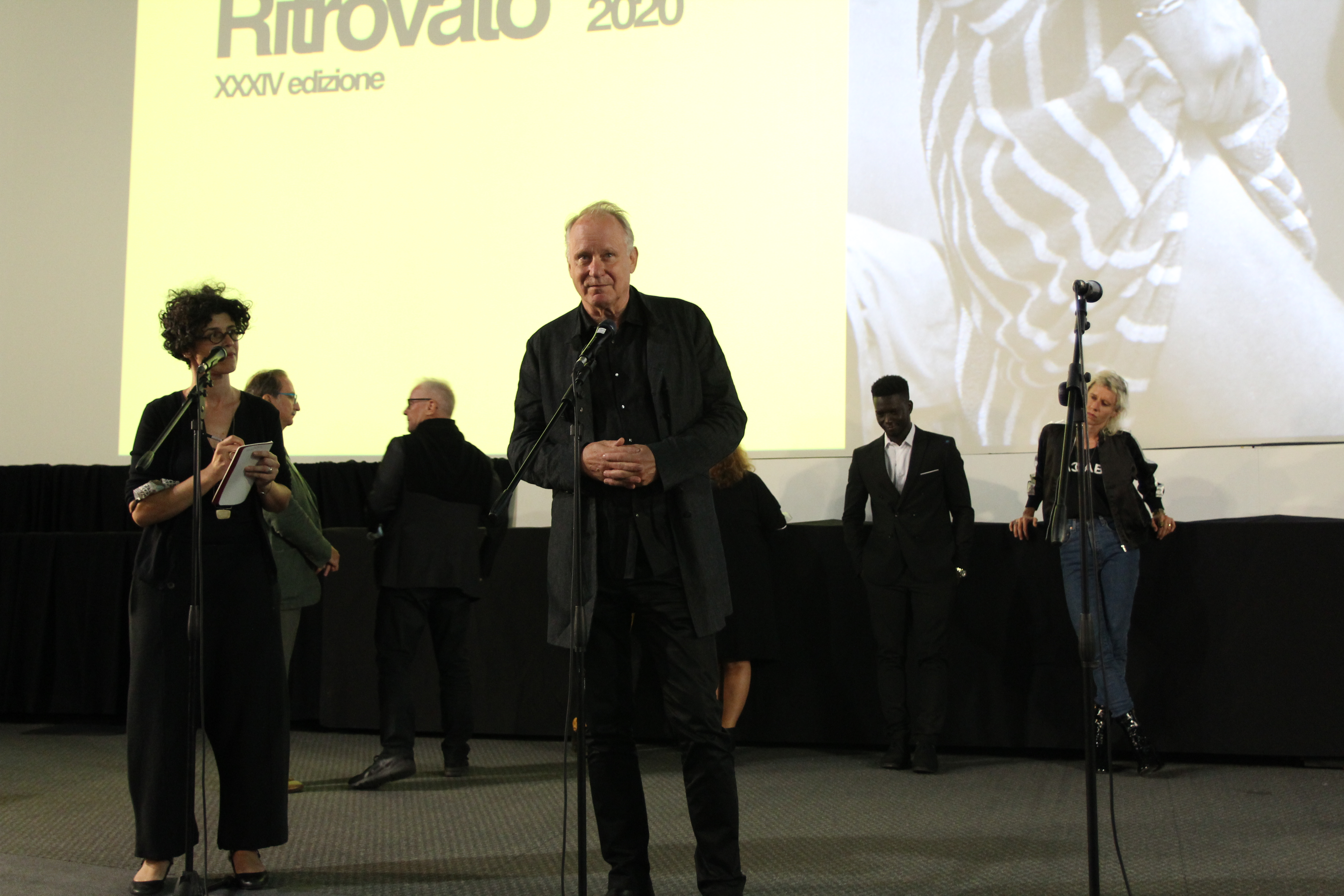
Actor Stellan Skarsgård and the director of the Cannes Film Festival Thierry Frémaux (in the background) at the prémiere of Last Words during the Cinema Ritrovato Festival in August 2020. The film was scheduled to be presented at Cannes before the festival was cancelled due to the COVID-19 pandemic.

The 73rd annual Cannes Film Festival was scheduled to take place from 12 to 23 May 2020. On 13 January 2020, Spike Lee was named as the president of the Jury. However, due to the COVID-19 pandemic in France, festival management announced on 14 April 2020 that the festival could not be held in its "original form", with alternative means of observing the festival being explored. It was cancelled for the first time since 1968.

Earlier, festival management considered holding the festival in June or July, after not cancelling the event. In mid-March, the festival's main venue, the Grand Auditorium Louis Lumière, was converted into a temporary homeless shelter. In May 2020, it was announced that no physical edition of the festival would take place, but a revised Official Selection of films was confirmed on 3 June 2020. Before announcing the list of films from the official selection, Thierry Frémaux the director of the Cannes Film Festival, said in an interview that he was talking with Spike Lee and also was hoping to have him as president of the jury on the 2021 edition. He also confirmed that Lee's film Da 5 Bloods was supposed to be the return of Netflix to the red carpet in the Out of Competition category.

In September, organizers announced that a limited outdoor festival, featuring screenings of four official selection films, the Short Film Palme d'Or competition and the Cinéfondation competition would take place on the Croisette from 27 to 29 October. The Critics' Week program also launched a free online screening of its short film selections in October.

== Official sections ==
The Official Selection has been divided in sub-categories, as directors or genres, not as competitors.

=== The Faithful (or at least selected once before) ===
English title	Original title	Director(s)	Production country
Another Round	Druk	Thomas Vinterberg	Denmark
DNA	ADN	Maïwenn	France
Forgotten We'll Be	El olvido que seremos	Fernando Trueba	Colombia
The French Dispatch		Wes Anderson	United States
Heaven: To the Land of Happiness	헤븐: 행복의 나라로	Im Sang-soo	South Korea
Home Front	Des hommes	Lucas Belvaux	France, Belgium
In the Dusk	Sutemose	Šarūnas Bartas	Lithuania, France, Serbia, Czech Republic, Latvia
Last Words		Jonathan Nossiter	France, Italy, United States
Lovers Rock		Steve McQueen	United Kingdom
Mangrove		Steve McQueen	United Kingdom
Peninsula	반도	Yeon Sang-ho	South Korea
The Real Thing	本気のしるし	Kōji Fukada	Japan
Summer of 85	Été 85	François Ozon	France
True Mothers	朝が来る	Naomi Kawase	Japan

=== The Newcomers ===
English title	Original title	Director(s)	Production country
Ammonite		Francis Lee	United Kingdom, Australia
Enfant Terrible		Oskar Roehler	Germany
February	Février	Kamen Kalev	Bulgaria, France
A Good Man		Marie-Castille Mention-Schaar	France, Belgium
Here We Are	הנה אנחנו	Nir Bergman	Israel, Italy
Limbo		Ben Sharrock	United Kingdom
Love Affair(s)	Les Choses qu'on dit, les choses qu'on fait	Emmanuel Mouret	France
Nadia, Butterfly		Pascal Plante	Canada
The Night Doctor	Médecin de nuit	Elie Wajeman	France
Red Soil	Rouge	Farid Bentoumi	France, Belgium
Simple Passion	Passion simple	Danielle Arbid	France, Belgium
Souad	سعاد	Ayten Amin	Egypt
Sweat		Magnus von Horn	Sweden, Poland
Teddy		Ludovic and Zoran Boukherma	France

=== Omnibus Film ===
English title	Original title	Director(s)	Production country
Septet: The Story of Hong Kong	七人樂隊	Sammo Hung, Ann Hui, Patrick Tam, Yuen Woo-ping, Johnnie To, Ringo Lam and Tsui Hark	Hong Kong

=== The First Features ===
English title	Original title	Director(s)	Production country
Beginning	დასაწყისი	Déa Kulumbegashvili	Georgia
Broken Keys	مفاتيح مكسرة	Jimmy Keyrouz	Lebanon, United States, France, Cyprus
The Death of Cinema and my Father Too		Dani Rosenberg	Israel
Falling		Viggo Mortensen	United States, United Kingdom, Canada
Gagarine		Fanny Liatard and Jérémy Trouilh	France
Ibrahim		Samir Guesmi	France
John and the Hole		Pascual Sisto	United States
Memory House	Casa de Antiguidades	João Paulo Miranda Maria	Brazil, France
My Best Part	Garçon chiffon	Nicolas Maury	France
Pleasure		Ninja Thyberg	Sweden, Netherlands, France
Should the Wind Drop (Presented with the ACID parallel section)	Si le vent tombe	Nora Martirosyan	France, Belgium, Armenia
Slalom		Charlène Favier	France
Spring Blossom	Seize printemps	Suzanne Lindon	France
Striding Into the Wind	野馬分鬃	Wei Shujun	China
Vaurien		Peter Dourountzis	France

=== Documentary Films ===
English title	Original title	Director(s)	Production country
9 Days at Raqqa	9 Jours à Raqqa	Xavier de Lauzanne	France
Downstream to Kinshasa	En route pour le milliard	Dieudo Hamadi	DR Congo, Belgium, France
The Truffle Hunters		Michael Dweck and Gregory Kershaw	United States, Italy, Greece

=== Comedy Films ===
English title	Original title	Director(s)	Production country
The Big Hit	Un triomphe	Emmanuel Courcol	France
Dear Mother (First feature film)	L'Origine du monde	Laurent Lafitte	France
French Tech	Les deux Alfred	Bruno Podalydès	France
My Donkey, My Lover & I	Antoinette dans les Cévènnes	Caroline Vignal	France
The Speech	Le Discours	Laurent Tirard	France

=== Animated Films ===
English title	Original title	Director(s)	Production country
Earwig and the Witch	アーヤと魔女	Gorō Miyazaki	Japan
Flee		Jonas Poher Rasmussen	Denmark, France, Sweden, Norway
Josep (First feature film)		Aurel	France
Soul		Pete Docter	United States

=== Short Films Competition ===
The films selected for the short film competition were announced on 19 June, a few weeks after the rest of the official selections. Despite the cancellation of the overall festival, the short films were announced with an indication that the competition would still proceed in the fall, with the exact dates and jury members to be named at a later date; in September, it was announced that the short films would be screened as part of the special outdoor screening series on the Croisette in October.

At the end of the Croisette screening series, the Short Film Palme d'Or was awarded to Sameh Alaa for the film I Am Afraid to Forget Your Face.

English title	Original title	Director(s)	Production country
Benjamin, Benny, Ben		Paul Shkordoff	Canada
Blue Fear	Filles bleue, peur blanche	Marie Jacotey and Lola Halifa-Legrand	France
Camille, Contactless	Camille sans contact	Paul Nouhet	France
David		Zach Woods	United States
I Am Afraid to Forget Your Face	ستاشر	Sameh Alaa	Egypt, France, Belgium, Qatar
The Lamb of God	O Cordeiro de Deus	David Pinheiro Vicente	Portugal, France
Motorway65		Evi Kalogiropoulou	Greece
Mountain Cat	Shiluus	Lkhagvadulam Purev-Ochir	Mongolia, United Kingdom
Son of Sodom		Theo Montoya	Colombia, Argentina
Stéphanie		Leonardo Van Dijl	Belgium
Sudden Light		Sophie Littman	United Kingdom

=== Cinéfondation ===
The Short Films and Cinéfondation Jury composed of Damien Bonnard, Rachid Bouchareb, Claire Burger, Charles Gillibert, Dea Kulumbegashvili and Céline Sallette, has awarded the 2020 Prizes of the Cinéfondation film school competition on 28 October 2020 on the stage of the Grand Théâtre Lumière as part of “Cannes 2020 Special”. The First Prize was awarded to Ashmita Guha Neogi for the film Catdog, the Second Prize was awarded to Yelyzaveta Pysmak for the film My Fat Arse and I and the Joint Third Prize was awarded to Lucia Chicos for Contraindications and Elsa Rosengren for I Want to Return Return Return.

English title	Original title	Director(s)	Production country
Agapé		Márk Beleznai	Hungary
Carcass	Carcasse	Timothée Maubrey	France
Catdog		Ashmita Guha Neogi	India
Contraindications	Contraindicatii	Lucia Chicos	Romania
Corte		Afonso Rapazote, Bernardo Rapazote	Portugal
The Last Ferry From Grass Island	Dou Zeoi Gu Si	Zhang Linhan	Hong Kong, United States
When We Leave	En Avant	Mitchelle Tamariz	France
I Want To Return Return Return		Elsa Rosengren	Germany
My Fat Arse And I	Ja i moja gruba dupa	Yelyzaveta Pysmak	Poland, Ukraine
Bird's Song	Le chant de l'oiseau	Sarah Imsand	Switzerland
Chinese Wall	Muralla China	Santiago Barzi	Argentina
Neurim		Shaylee Atary	Israel
Nobody Said I Have to Love You	Nihče ni rekel, da te moram imeti rad	Matjaž Jamnik	Slovenia
Pile		Toby Auberg	United Kingdom
Twenty	Seonginsik	Kim Min-Ju	South Korea
Taipei Suicide Story		KEFF	Taiwan
Tamou		Tzor Edery, Tom Prezman	Israel

=== Cannes Classics ===
The full line-up for the Cannes Classics section was announced on 17 July 2020.

English title	Original title	Director(s)	Production country
Restorations
In the Mood for Love (2000)	花樣年華	Wong Kar-Wai	Hong Kong
Friendship's Death (1987)		Peter Wollen	United Kingdom
The Story of a Three-Day Pass (1967)	La Permission	Melvin Van Peebles	France
July Rain (1966)	Июльский дождь	Marlen Khutsiev	Soviet Union
Quand les femmes ont pris la colère (1977)		Soizick Chappedelaine, René Vautier	France
Get Out Your Handkerchiefs (1978)	Préparez vos mouchoirs	Bertrand Blier	France
Hester Street (1975)		Joan Micklin Silver	United States
Who’s Singing Over There? (1980)	Ko to tamo peva	Slobodan Šijan	Yugoslavia
Black Silk (1961)	แพรดำ	R.D. Pestonji	Thailand
New Year Sacrifice (1956)	祝福	Hu Sang	China
Upthrown Stone (1968)	Feldobott kő	Sándor Sára	Hungary
Neige (1981)		Juliet Berto, Jean-Henri Roger	France
The Wasps Are Here (1978)	බඹරු ඇවිත්	Dharmasena Pathiraja	Sri Lanka
This is My Country (1984)	Bayan ko: Kapit sa patalim	Lino Brocka	Philippines
La Poupée (1962)		Jacques Baratier	France
The Hourglass Sanatorium (1973)	Sanatorium pod klepsydrą	Wojciech Has	Poland
America as Seen by a Frenchman (1959)	L'Amérique insolite	François Reichenbach	France
The Ninth Circle (1960)	Девети круг	France Štiglic	Yugoslavia
Muhammad Ali the Greatest (1974)		William Klein	France
Martin Scorsese’s The Film Foundation celebrate its 30th birthday
Accattone (1961)		Pier Paolo Pasolini	Italy
The Chess Game of the Wind (1976)	شطرنج باد	Mohammad Reza Aslani	Iran
Federico 100
La strada (1956)		Federico Fellini	Italy
Variety Lights (1950)	Luci del varietà	Alberto Lattuada, Federico Fellini	Italy
Fellini of the Spirits		Anselma dell’Olio	Italy, Belgium
À Bout de souffle and L’Avventura turn 60
Breathless (1960)	À bout de souffle	Jean-Luc Godard	France
The Adventure (1960)	L'Avventura	Michelangelo Antonioni	Italy
Documentaries 2020
Wim Wenders, Desperado		Eric Friedler, Andreas Frege	Germany
Alida Valli: In Her Own Words		Mimmo Verdesca	Italy
Charlie Chaplin, The Genius of Liberty	Charlie Chaplin, le génie de la liberté	François Aymé, Yves Jeuland	France
Be Water		Bao Nguyen	United States
Belushi		R.J. Cutler	United States
Antena da raça		Paloma Rocha, Luís Abramo	Brazil

== Independent sections ==
=== Critics' Week ===
The following films have received a special and official label, delivered by the Critics' Week:

English title	Original title	Director(s)	Production country
Features
After Love		Aleem Khan	United Kingdom, France
Gold for Dogs	De l'or pour les chiens	Anna Cazenave Cambet	France
The Swarm	La Nuée	Just Philippot	France
Skies of Lebanon	Sous le ciel d'Alice	Chloé Mazlo	France
Beasts	La Terre des hommes	Naël Marandin	France
Short Films
August 22, This Year		Graham Foy	Canada
Dustin		Naïla Guiguet	France
Foreigner	Forastera	Lucía Aleñar Iglesias	Spain
Good Thanks, You?		Molly Manning Walker	United Kingdom
Humongous!	とてつもなく大きな	Aya Kazawoe	Japan
Maalbeek		Ismaël Joffroy Chandoutis	France
Marlon Brando		Vincent Tilanus	Netherlands
Menarche	Menarca	Lillah Halla	Brazil
Towards Evening	Axşama doğru	Teymur Hajiyev	Azerbaijan
White Goldfish		Jan Roossens, Raf Roossens	Belgium

=== Directors' Fortnight ===
A full Directors' Fortnight selection could not be announced due to it being incomplete when the festival was cancelled. However, two titles were announced in July 2020 so that they could utilize the Director's Fortnight label.

English title	Original title	Director(s)	Production country
Kajillionaire		Miranda July	United States
We Are Who We Are		Luca Guadagnino	United States, Italy

=== ACID ===
The following films have received a special and official label, delivered by the ACID (Association for the Distribution of Independent Cinema).

English title	Original title	Director(s)	Production country
Coalesce	Les affluents	Jessé Miceli	Cambodia, France
Tightrope Walkers	Funambules	Ilan Klipper	France
The Seeds We Sow	Les Graines que l'on sème	Nathan Nicholovitch	France
Il Mio Corpo		Michele Pennetta	Switzerland, Italy
The Last Hillbilly		Diane Sara Bouzgarrou, Thomas Jenkoe	France, Qatar
Far From You I Grew	Loin de vous j'ai grandi	Marie Dumora	France
Should the Wind Drop (Presented with Cannes Film Festival's Official Selection)	Si le vent tombe	Nora Martirosyan	France, Belgium, Armenia
Last Days of Spring	La Última Primavera	Isabel Lamberti	Netherlands, Spain
Walden		Bojena Horackova	France, Lithuania

The ACID Trip #4 program, which should have been dedicated to young Chilean cinema, has been postponed to the next edition, in 2021.
