= Short Film Palme d'Or =

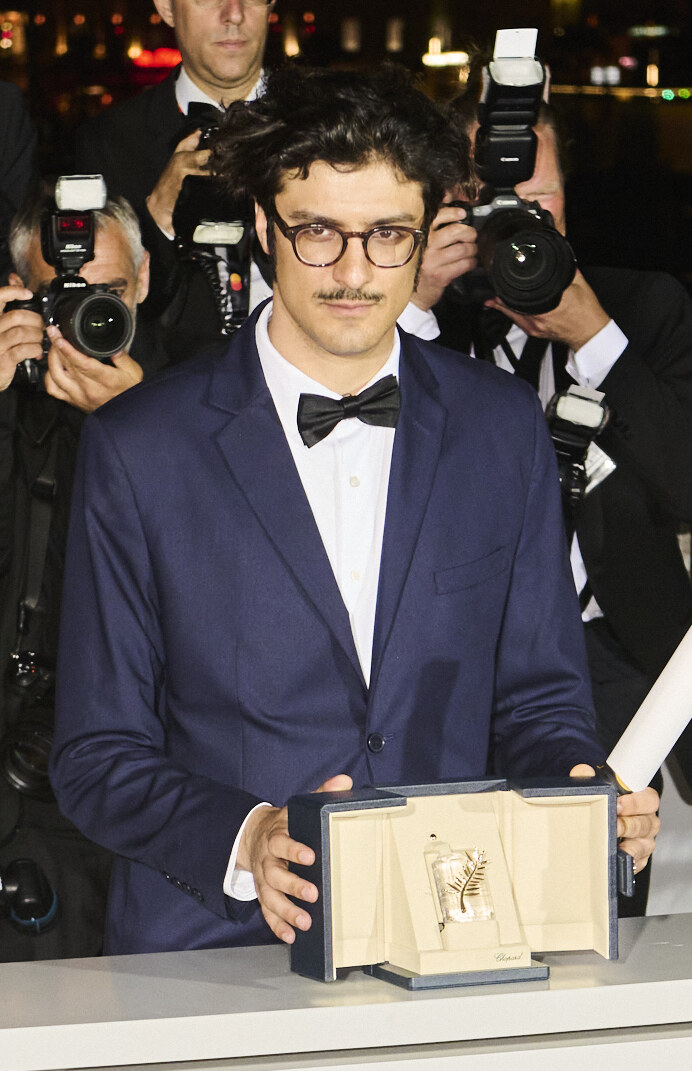
- 2026 recipient: Federico Luis
- Awarded for: Best short film
- Location: Cannes
- Country: France
- Presented by: Festival de Cannes
- First award: 1957
- Currently held by: For the Opponents (2026)
- Website: www.festival-cannes.com

Official logo

The Short Film Palme d'Or (French: Palme d'Or du court métrage) is the highest prize given to a short film at the Cannes Film Festival.

Its most recent winner was For the Opponents (2026) directed by Federico Luis, at the 79th Cannes Film Festival.

== History ==
From 1952 to 1954 and from 1964 to 1974, the highest prize of the year for a short film was awarded as the Grand Prix du Festival International du Film, commonly referred to as Grand Prix. It was then in 1975 that the "Palme d'Or was reintroduced and became the enduring symbol of the Festival de Cannes."

Before 1952, various prizes were awarded to short films, including a Grand Prix for Documentaries in 1947, five specific prizes in 1949, and a Grand Prix for Best Scientific Film in 1951.

During some years, short films are awarded the Prix du Jury, the Prix spécial du Jury, the Mention Spéciale, Hommage, and various prizes from the CST (Commission Supérieure Technique de l’Image et du Son), including the Grand Prix Technique.

Since the creation of the Cinéfondation section in 1998, is a common a joint jury for the Short Film Palme d'Or and for the Cinéfondation prizes.

Among its past winners are Joris Ivens, Serge Bourguignon, Jane Campion, Jim Jarmusch, Carlos Carrera, Xavier Giannoli, Simón Mesa Soto, Ely Dagher, Juanjo Giménez, Sameh Alaa, Flóra Anna Buda and Nebojša Slijepčević.

== Winners ==
The following list shows the short films that won the Short Film Palme d'Or, or the Grand Prix for the years that this was the highest prize awarded:

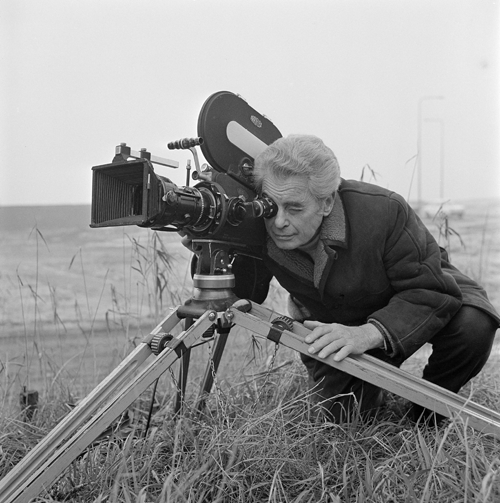
Joris Ivens won for The Seine Meets Paris (1958)

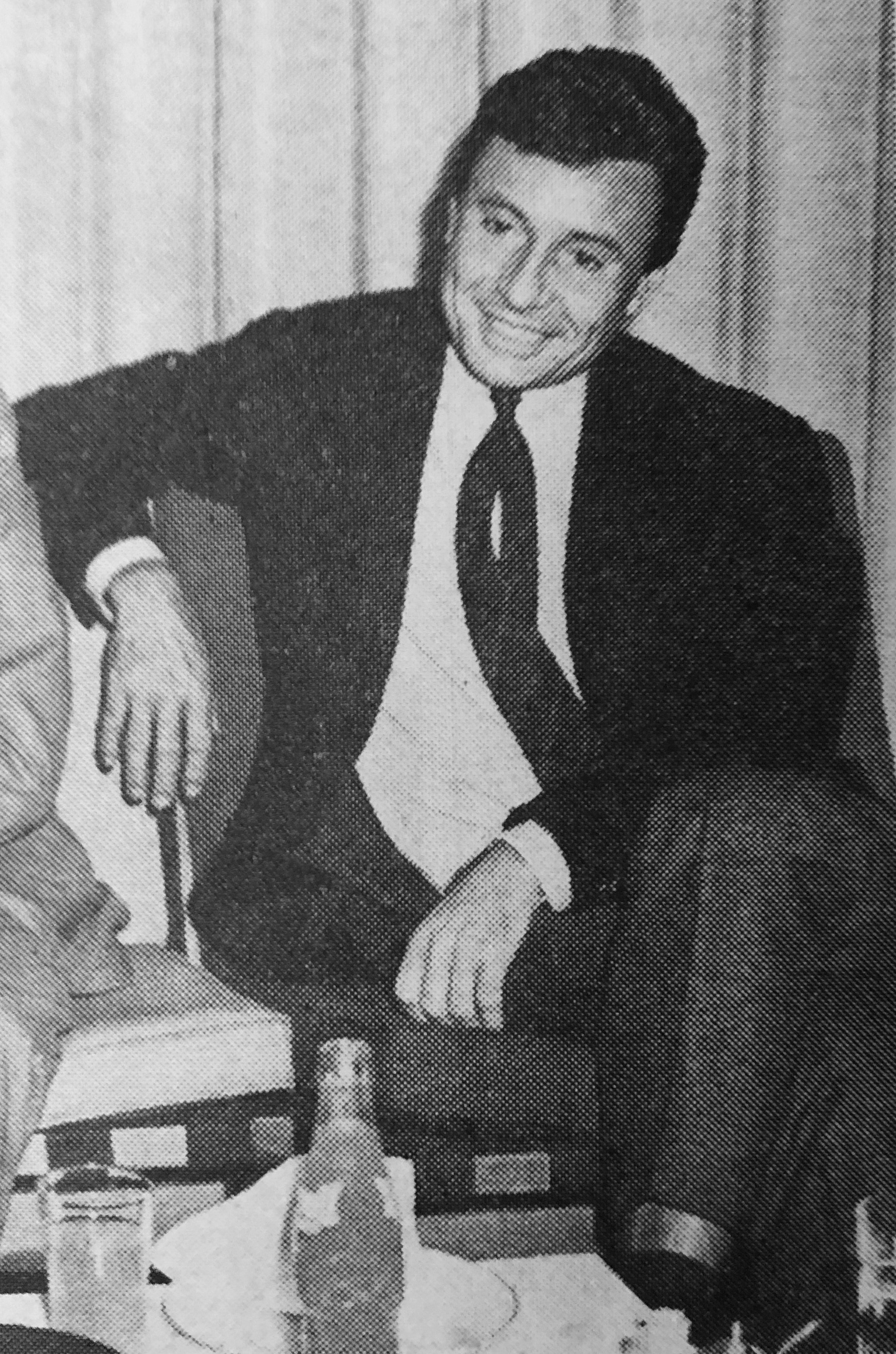
Serge Bourguignon won for Le sourire (1960)

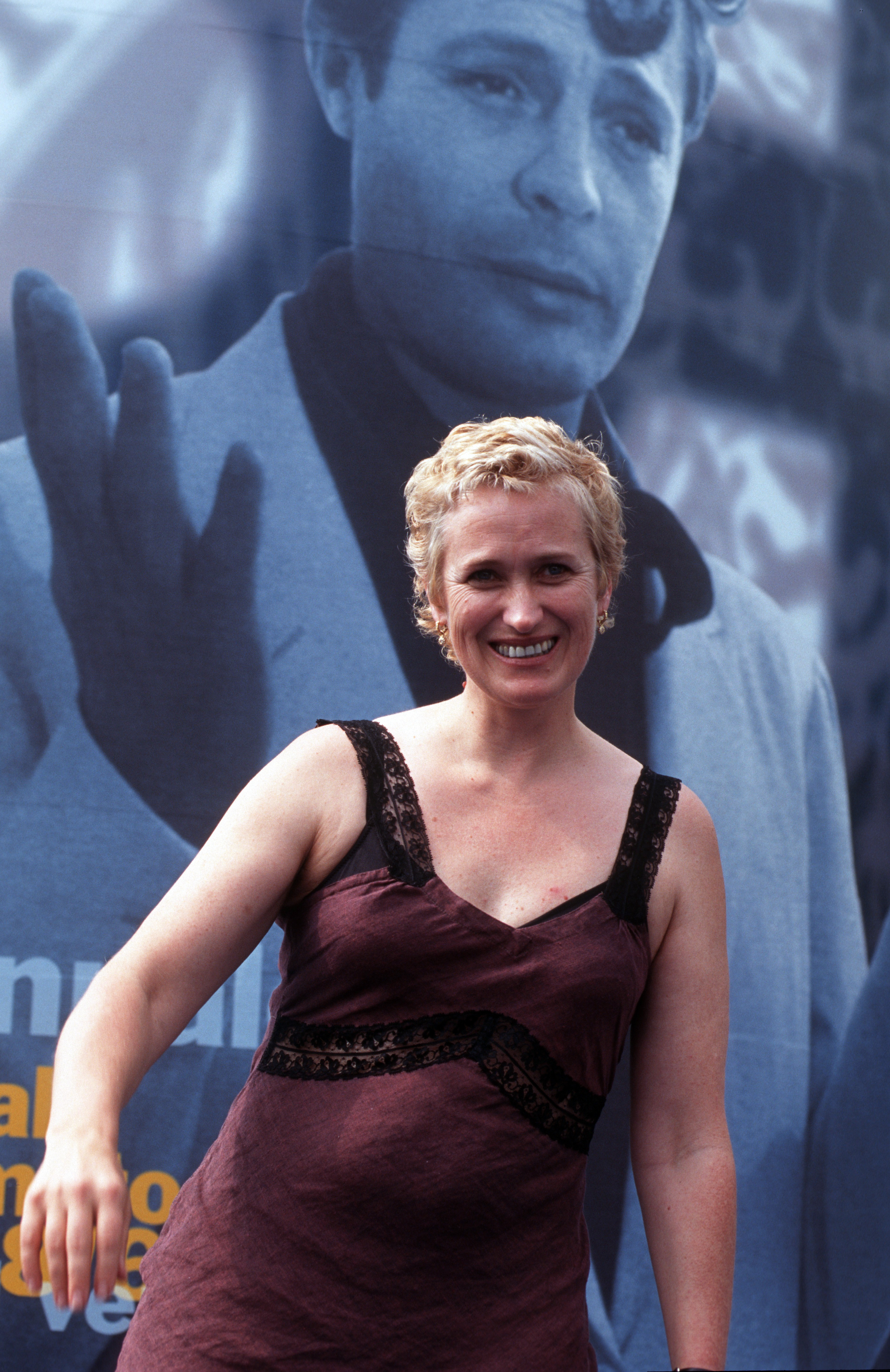
Jane Campion won for Peel (1986)

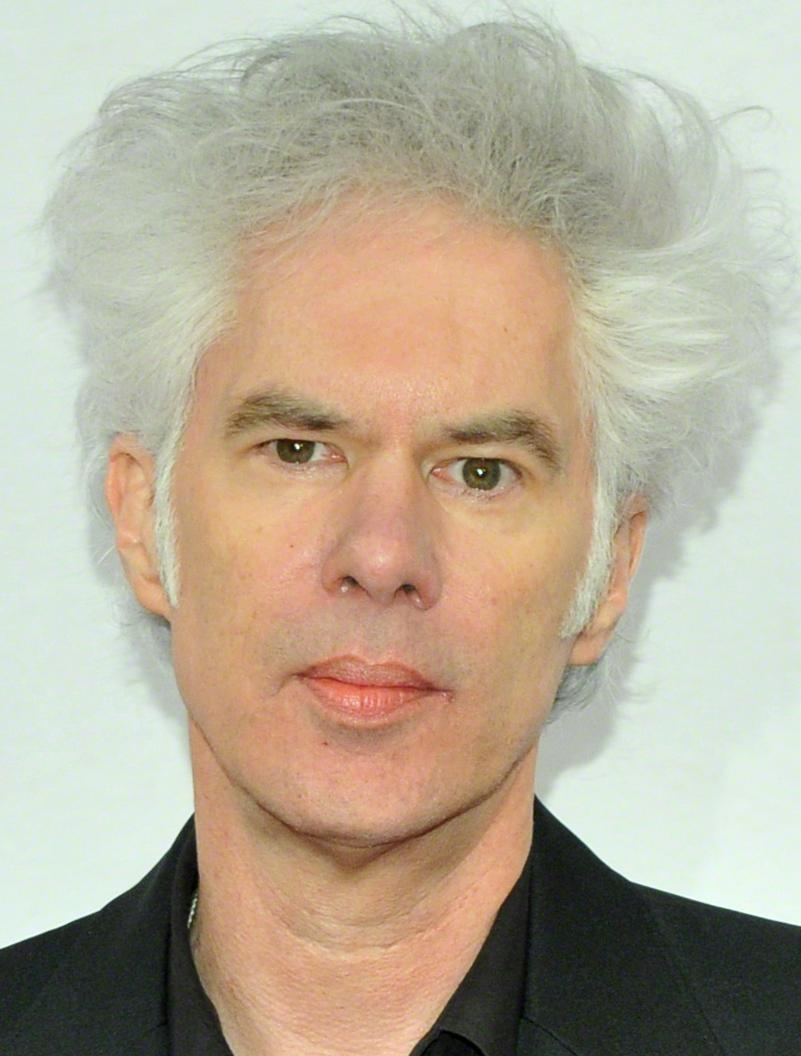
Jim Jarmusch won for Coffee and Cigarettes (Somewhere in California) (1993)

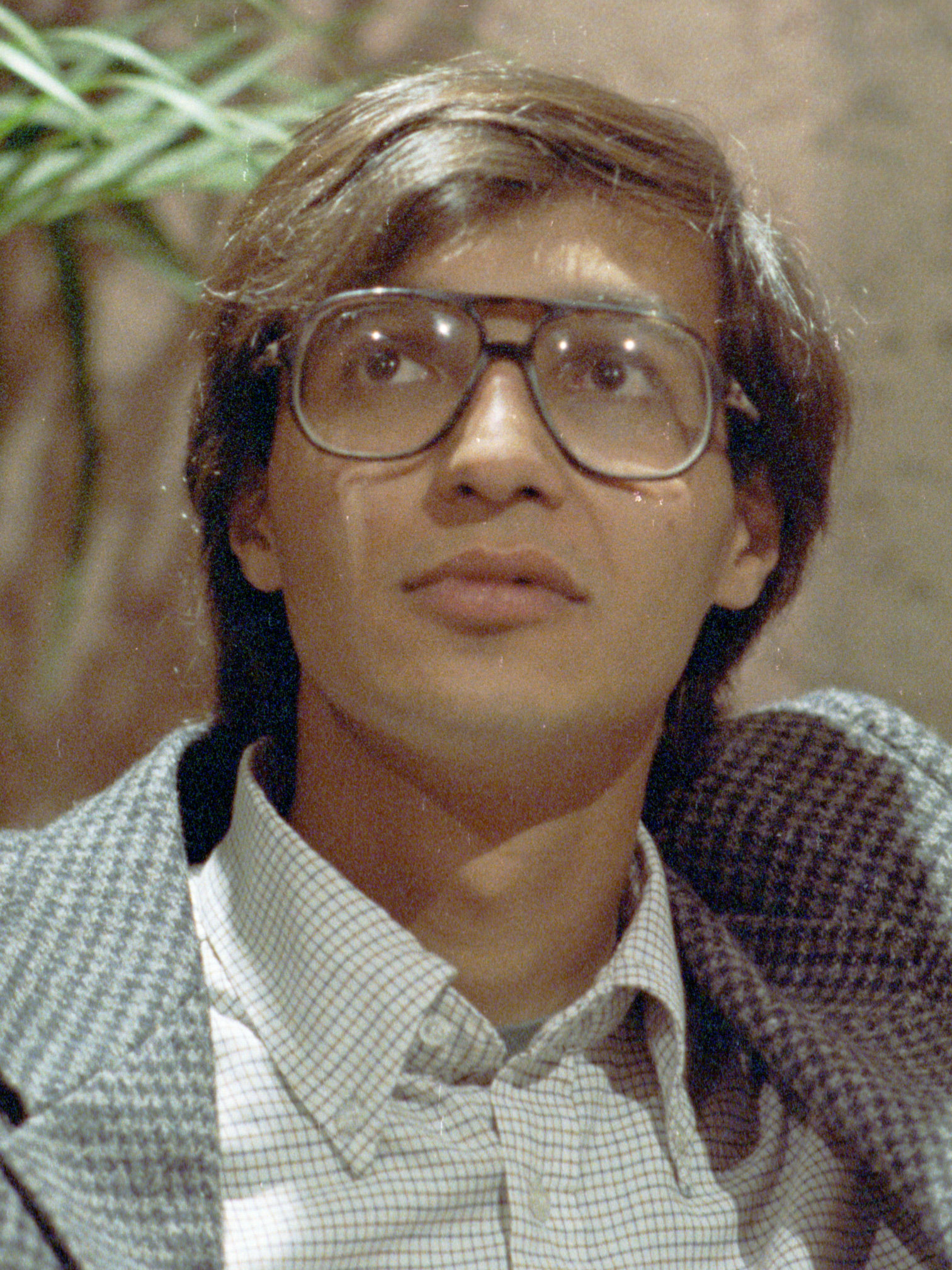
Carlos Carrera won for El héroe (1994)

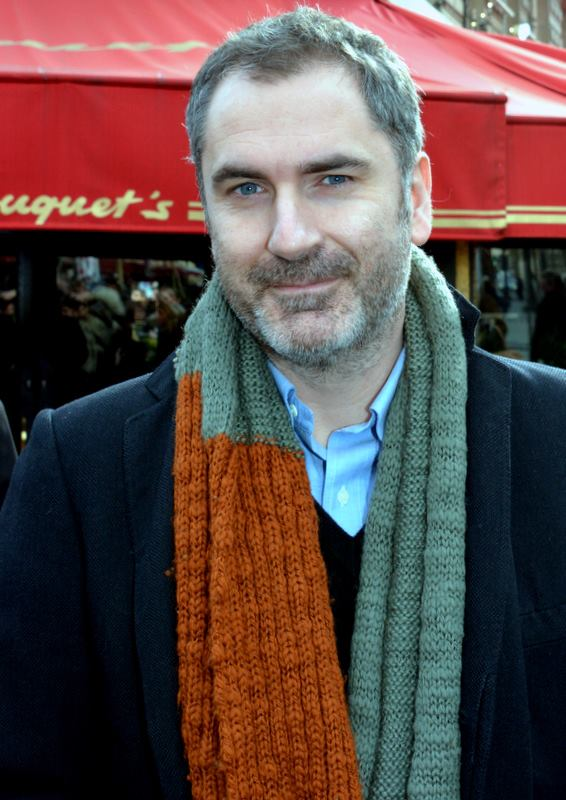
Xavier Giannoli won for L'Interview (1998)

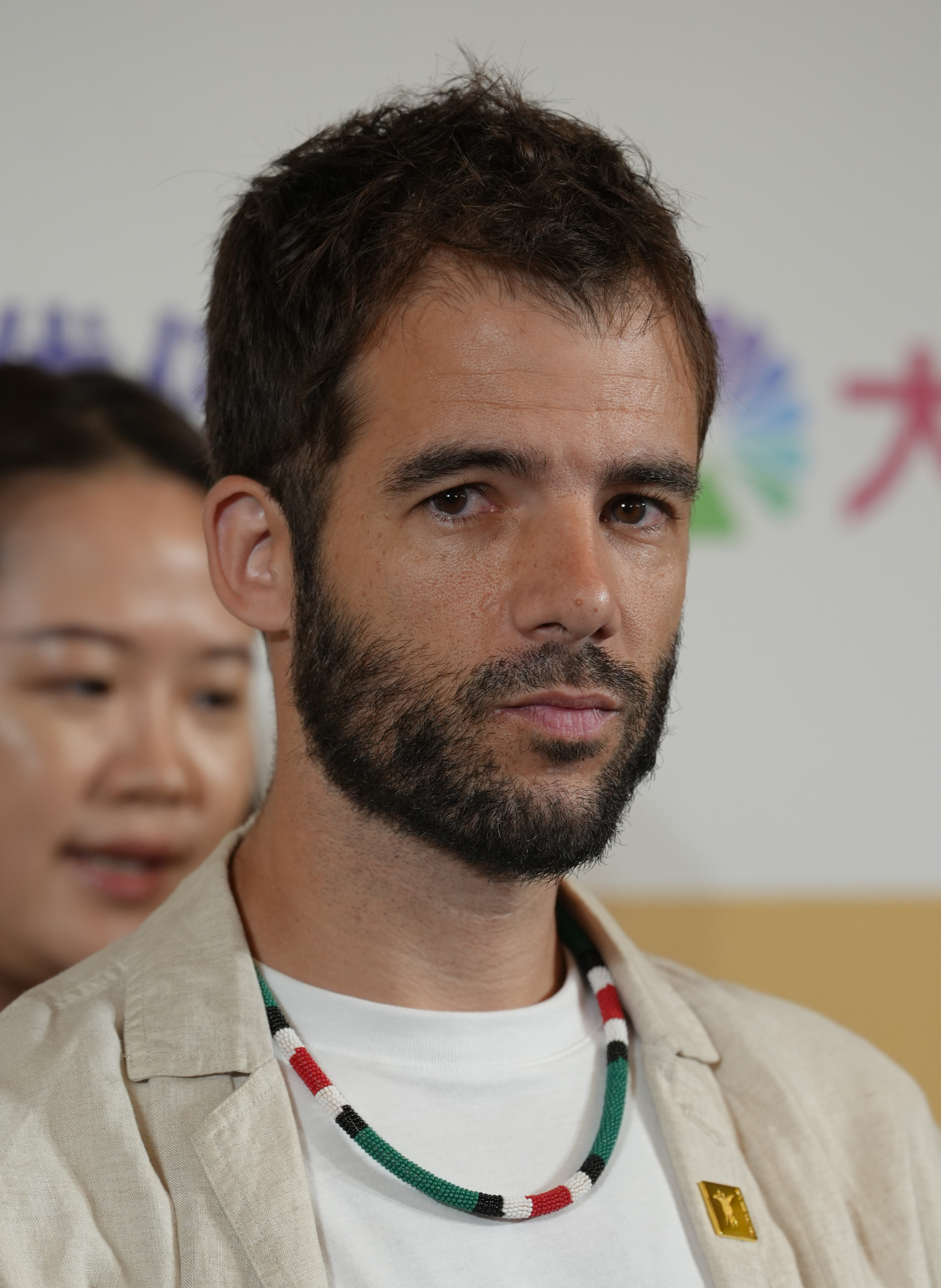
João Salaviza won for Arena (2009)

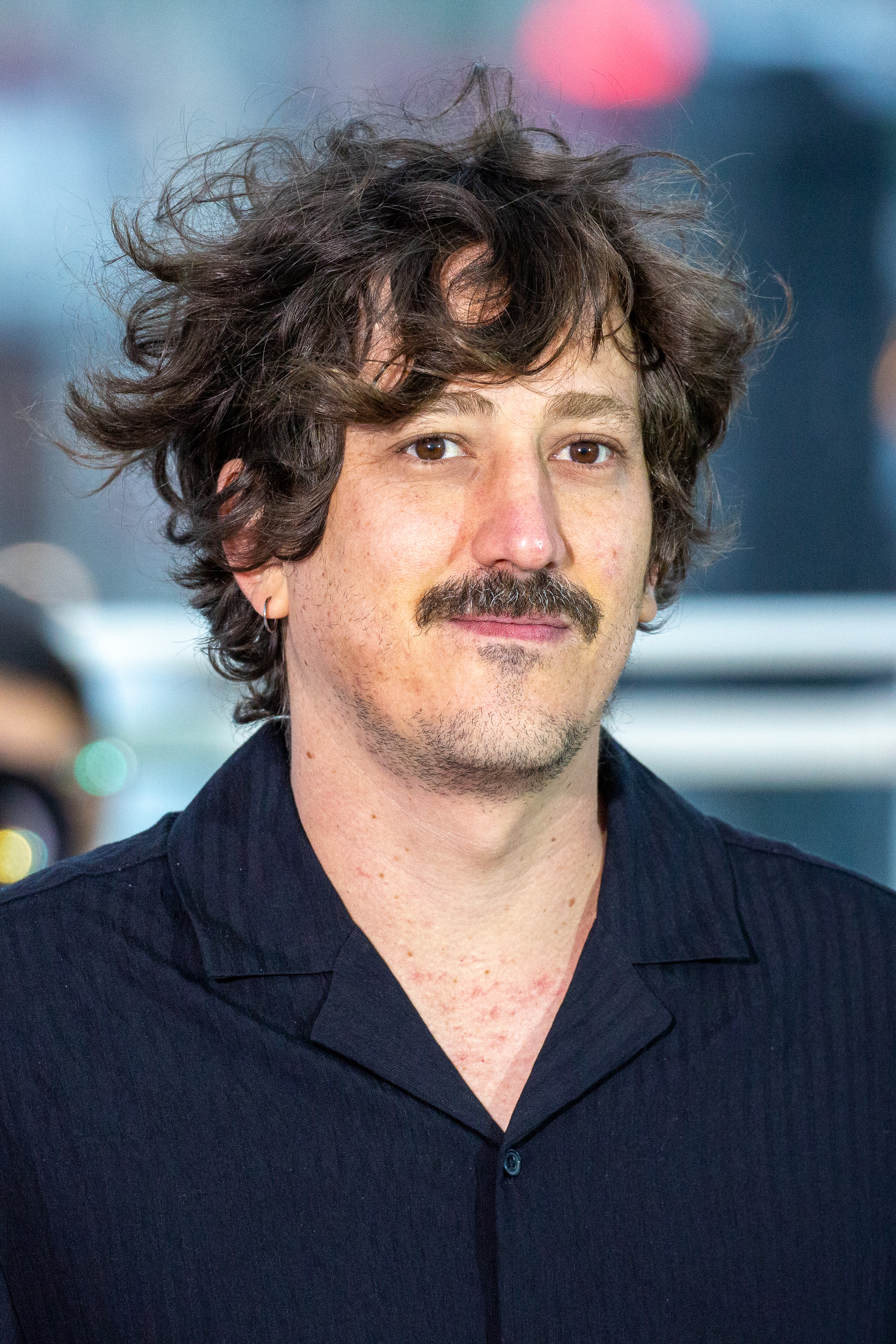
Simón Mesa Soto won for Leidi (2014)

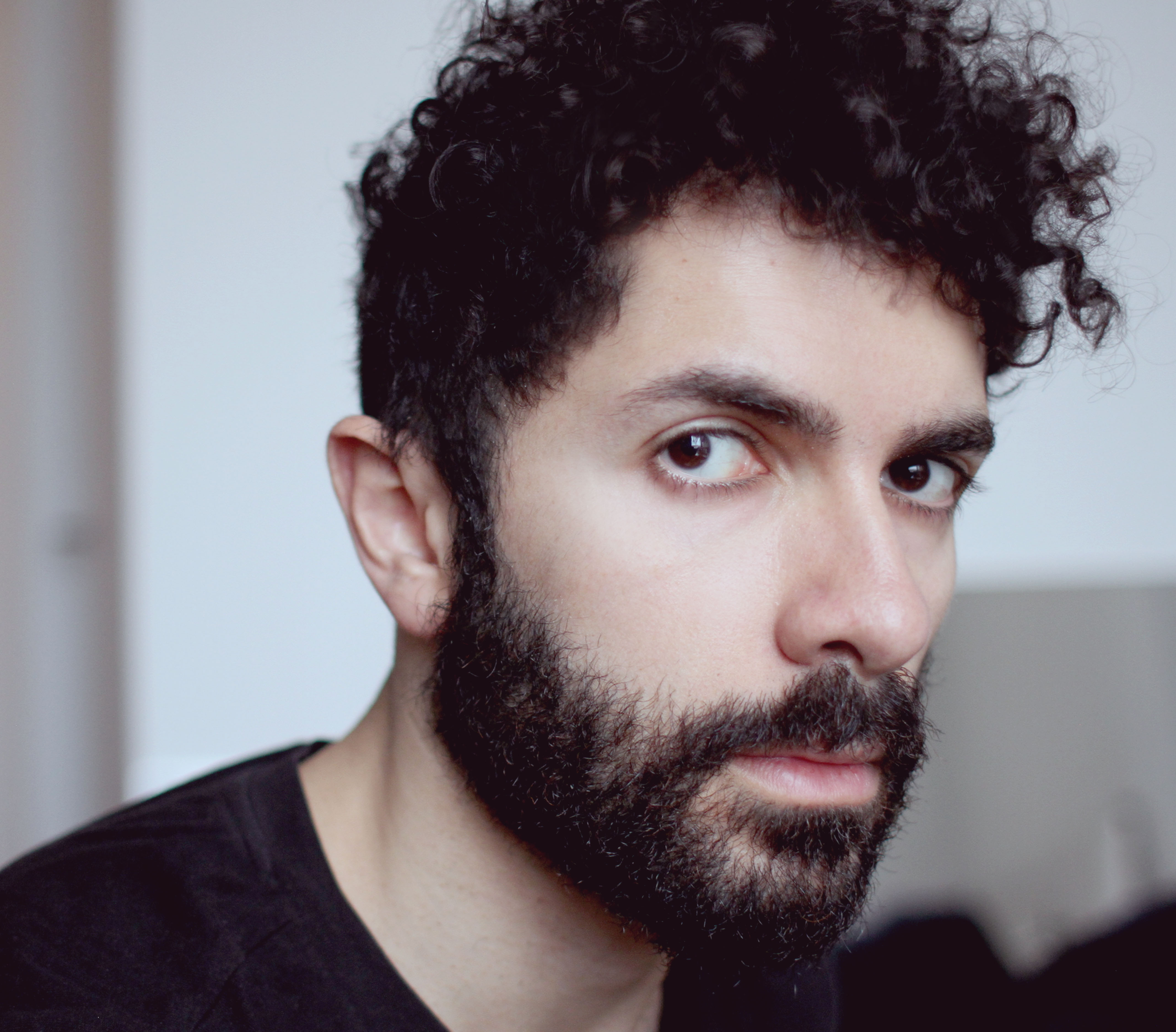
Ely Dagher won for Waves '98 (2015)

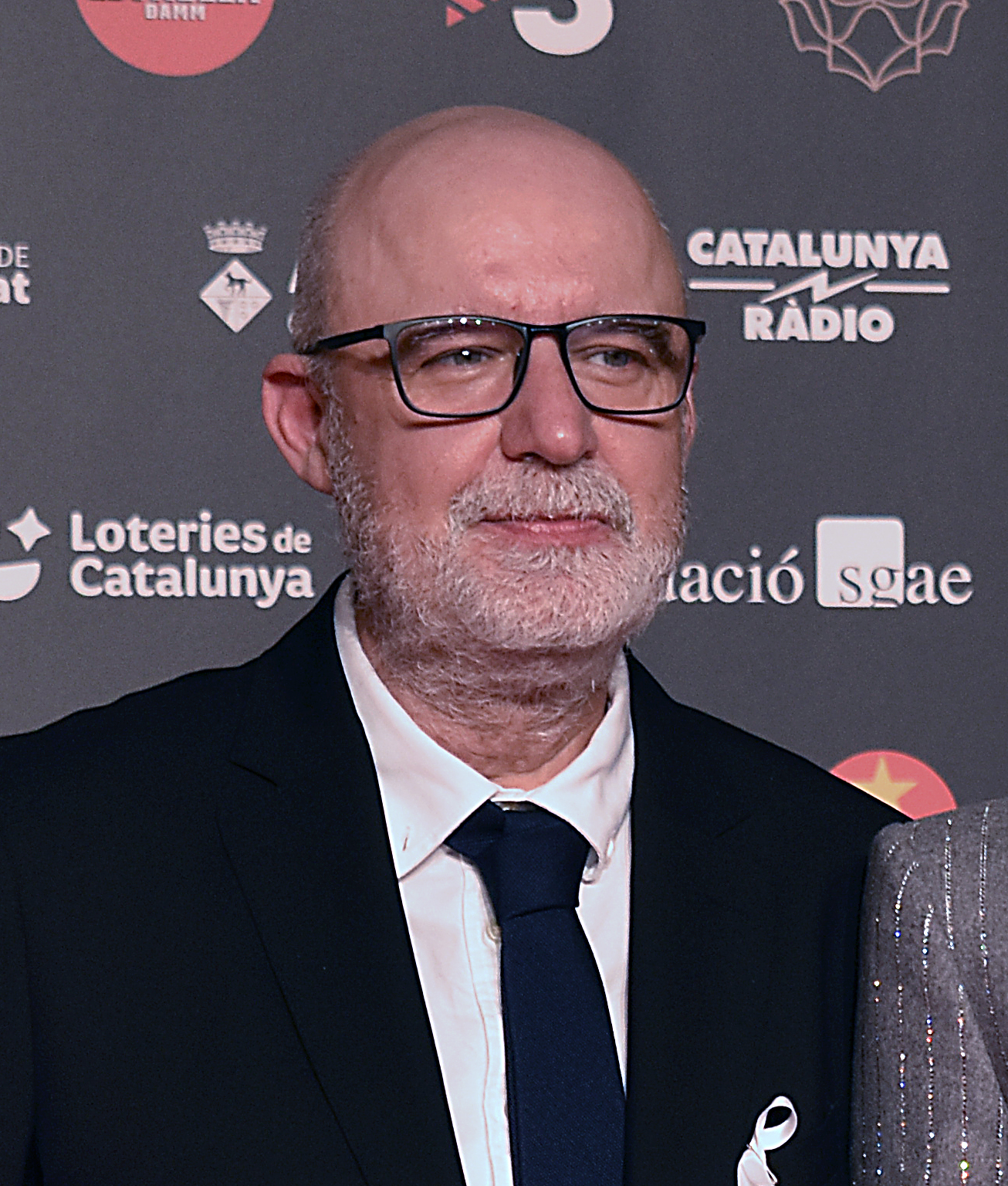
Juanjo Giménez won for Timecode (2016)

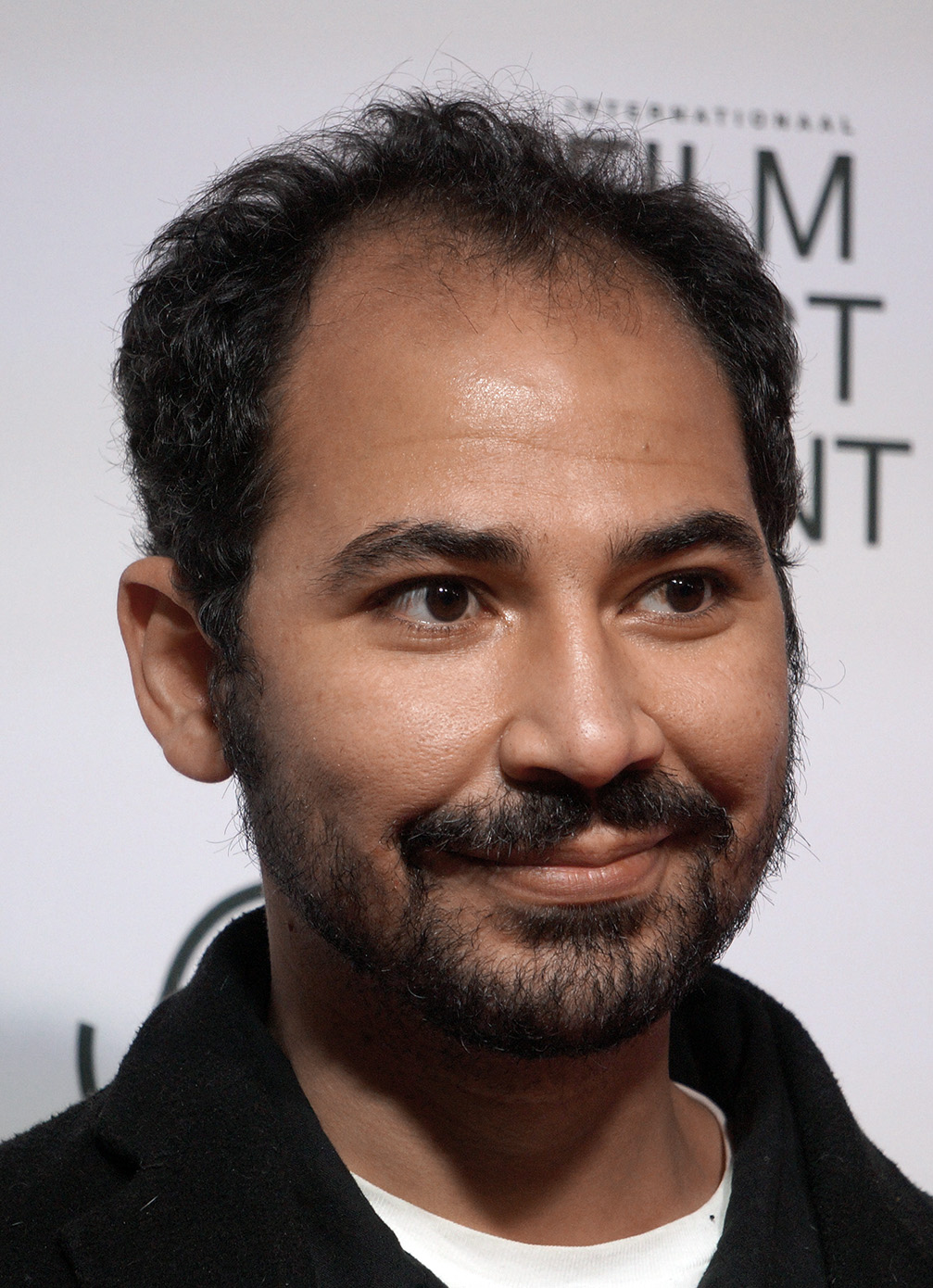
Sameh Alaa won for I Am Afraid to Forget Your Face (2020)

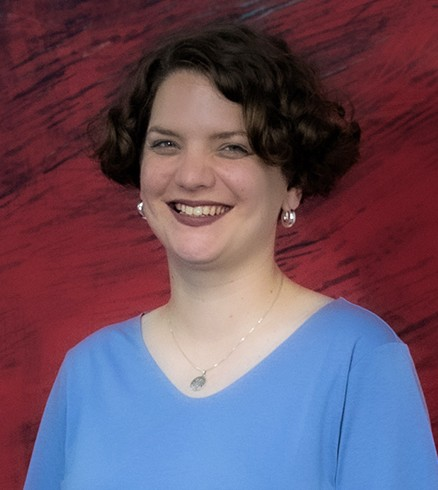
Flóra Anna Buda won for 27 (2023)

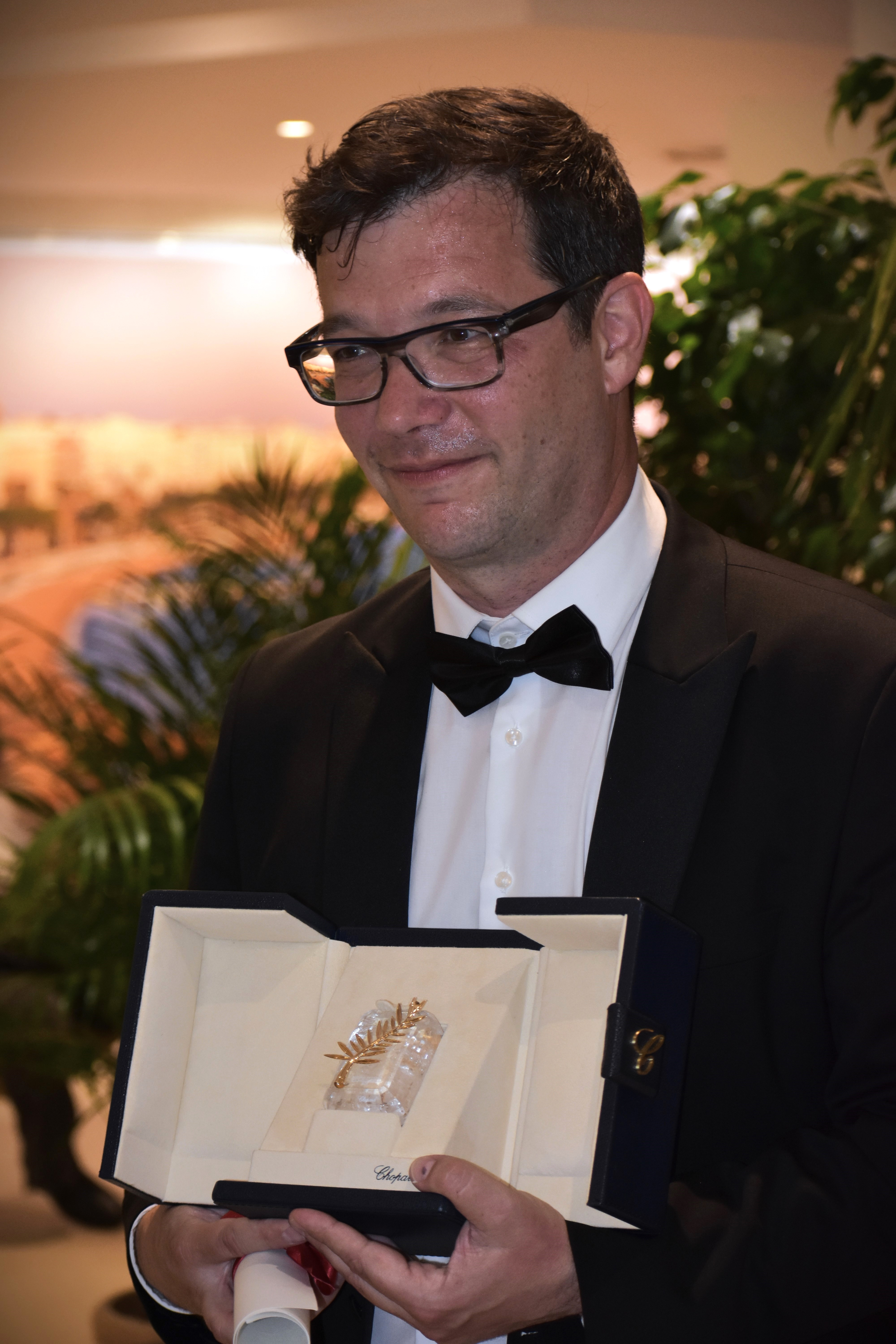
Nebojša Slijepčević won for The Man Who Could Not Remain Silent (2024)

=== 1950s ===
Year	English Title	Original Title	Director	Production Country
Awarded as "Grand Prix"
1952	’t Schot is te boord!		Herman van der Horst	Netherlands
1953	White Mane	Crin-Blanc: Le cheval sauvage	Albert Lamorisse	France
Awarded as "Palme d'Or"
1955	Blinkity Blank		Norman McLaren	United Kingdom, Canada
1956	The Red Balloon	Le Ballon rouge	Albert Lamorisse	France
1957	A Brief History	Scurtă Istorie	Ion Popescu-Gopo	Romania
1958	The Seine Meets Paris	La Seine a recontré Paris	Joris Ivens	Netherlands
1958	La Joconde: Histoire d'une obsession		Henri Gruel	France
1959	Butterflies Don't Live Here	Motýli tady nežijí	Miro Bernat	Czechoslovakia

=== 1960s ===
Year	English Title	Original Title	Director	Production Country
1960	Le sourire		Serge Bourguignon	France
1961	La Petite Cuillère	A Colher Egípcia	Carlos Vilardebó	Portugal
1962	An Occurrence at Owl Creek Bridge	La Rivière du Hibou	Robert Enrico	France
Awarded as "Grand Prix" or "Grand Prix International du Festival"
1963	A fleur d'eau	In wechselndem Gefälle	Alexander J. Seiler	Switzerland
1963	Le Haricot		Edmond Séchan	France
1964	La douceur du village		François Reichenbach	France
1964	The Price of Victory	挑戦	Nobuko Shibuya	Japan
1965	Overture	Nyitány	János Vadász	Hungary
1966	Skaterdater		Noel Black	United States
1967	Sky Over Holland		John Fernhout	Netherlands
1969	Cântecele Renașterii		Mirel Ilieșiu	Romania

=== 1970s ===
Year	English Title	Original Title	Director	Production Country
1972	Le Fusil à Lunette		Jean Chapot	France
1973	Balablok		Břetislav Pojar	Czechoslovakia
1974	Ostrov	Остров	Fyodor Khitruk	Soviet Union
Awarded as "Palme d'Or"
1975	Lautrec		Geoff Dunbar	United Kingdom
1976	Metamorphosis		Barry Greenwald	Canada
1977	The Struggle	Küzdők	Marcell Jankovics	Hungary
1978	Rowing Across the Atlantic	La Traversée de l'Atlantique à la rame	Jean-François Laguionie	France
1979	Harpya		Raoul Servais	Belgium

=== 1980s ===
Year	English Title	Original Title	Director	Production Country
1980	Seaside Woman		Oscar Grillo	Argentina
1981	Moto Perpetuo		Béla Vajda	Hungary
1982	Merlin ou le cours de l'or		Arthur Joffé	France
1983	Je sais que j'ai tort mais demandez à mes copains ils disent la même chose		Pierre Levy	France
1984	Le Cheval de fer		Gérald Frydman, Pierre Levie	Belgium
1985	Marriage	Женитба	Slav Bakalov, Rumen Petkov	Bulgaria
1986	Peel		Jane Campion	New Zealand
1987	Palisade		Laurie McInnes	Australia
1988	Vykrutasy	Выкрутасы	Garri Bardin	Soviet Union
1989	50 ans		Gilles Carle	Canada

=== 1990s ===
Year	English Title	Original Title	Director	Production Country
1990	The Lunch Date		Adam Davidson	United States
1991	With Hands Raised	Со кренати раце	Mitko Panov	Republic of Macedonia
1992	Omnibus		Sam Karmann	France
1993	Coffee and Cigarettes (Somewhere in California)		Jim Jarmusch	United States
1994	El héroe		Carlos Carrera	Mexico
1995	Gagarin	Гагарин	Aleksey Kharitidi	Russia
1996	Szél		Marcell Iványi	Hungary
1997	Is It the Design on the Wrapper?		Tessa Sheridan	United Kingdom
1998	L'Interview		Xavier Giannoli	France
1999	When the Day Breaks		Wendy Tilby and Amanda Forbis	Canada

=== 2000s ===
Year	English Title	Original Title	Director	Production Country
2000	Shadows	Anino	Raymond Red	Philippines
2001	Bean Cake		David Greenspan	United States
2002	After Rain	Esö után	Péter Mészáros	Hungary
2003	Cracker Bag		Glendyn Ivin	Australia
2004	Trafic		Cătălin Mitulescu	Romania
2005	Wayfarers	Подорожні	Igor Strembitskyy	Ukraine
2006	Sniffer		Bobbie Peers	Norway
2007	Ver Llover		Elisa Miller	Mexico
2008	Megatron		Marian Crișan	Romania
2009	Arena		João Salaviza	Portugal

=== 2010s ===
Year	English Title	Original Title	Director	Production Country
2010	Chienne d'Histoire		Serge Avedikian	France
2011	Cross-Country	Крос	Maryna Vroda	France, Ukraine
2012	Silent	Sessiz	L. Rezan Yeşilbaş	Turkey
2013	Safe	세이프	Moon Byoung-gon	South Korea
2014	Leidi		Simón Mesa Soto	Colombia
2015	Waves '98	موج ۹۸	Ely Dagher	Lebanon, Qatar
2016	Timecode		Juanjo Giménez	Spain
2017	A Gentle Night	小城二月	Qiu Yang	China
2018	All These Creatures		Charles Williams	Australia
2019	The Distance Between Us and the Sky	Η απόσταση ανάμεσα στον ουρανό κι εμάς	Vasilis Kekatos	Greece, France

=== 2020s ===
Year	English Title	Original Title	Director	Production Country	Ref
2020	I Am Afraid to Forget Your Face	ستاشر	Sameh Alaa	Egypt	
2021	All the Crows in the World	天下烏鴉	Tang Yi	Hong Kong	
2022	The Water Murmurs	海边升起一座悬崖	Jianying Chen	China	
2023	27		Flóra Anna Buda	Hungary, France	
2024	The Man Who Could Not Remain Silent	Čovjek koji nije mogao šutjeti	Nebojša Slijepčević	Croatia, France, Slovenia, Bulgaria	
2025	I'm Glad You're Dead Now		Tawfeek Barhom	Palestine, France, Greece	
2026	For the Opponents	Para los contrincantes	Federico Luis	Mexico, Chile, France	

== List of other awards ==
Year	Award	Film	Director
1940s
1947	Grand Prix - Documentaires	Inondations en Pologne	Jerzy Bossak, Wacław Kaźmierczak
1949	Prix pour le Sujet	Palle Alene i Verden	Astrid Henning-Jensen
1949	Prix pour le Montage	Pacific 231	Jean Mitry
1949	Prix pour la Photographie	Biały redyk	Stanisław Możdżeński
1949	Prix pour la Couleur	Images Médiévales	William Novik
1949	Prix pour le Reportage Filmé	Seal Island	James Algar
1950s
1951	Grand Prix pour le Meilleur Film Scientifique	L'Eruption de l'Etna	Domenico Paolella
1951	Prix Spécial du Jury	La Voie Est-Ouest	K. Gordon Murray
1951	Prix Spécial du Jury	Ukraine en Fleurs	Mikhail Slutsky
1951	Prix Spécial du Jury	Lettonie Soviètique	F. Kissiliov
1951	Prix Spécial du Jury	Esthonie Soviètique	V. Tomber, I. Guidine
1951	Prix Spécial du Jury	Azerbaidjan Soviètique	F. Kissiliov, M. Dadachev
1952	Prix Spécial du Jury	Indisk By	Arne Sucksdorff
1952	Prix pour la Couleur	Animated Genesis	Peter Foldes, Joan Foldes
1952	Prix Spécial du Jury - Film Scientifique ou Pédagogique	Groenland: Vingt Mille Lieux sur les Glace	Marcel Ichac, Jean-Jacques Languepin
1953	Prix du Film de Realité	Houen zo!	Herman van der Horst
1953	Prix du Film de Fiction	The Stranger Left No Card	Wendy Toye
1953	Prix du Film d'Art	Doderhultarn	Olle Hellbom
1953	Prix du Film d'Animation	The Romance of Transportation in Canada	Colin Low
1954	Prix du Film de Divertissement	Toot, Whistle, Plunk and Boom	Ward Kimball, Charles A. Nichols
1954	Prix du Film de Marionettes	A Drop Too Much (O sklenicku víc)	Břetislav Pojar
1954	Prix du Film de Realité	Stare Miasto	Jerzy Bossak
1954	Prix du Film de Fantaisie Poetique	The Pleasure Garden	James Broughton
1954	Prix du Film de Nature	Aptenodytes Forsteri	Mario Marret
1955	Prix du Meilleur Documentaire	Isola di Fuoco	Vittorio De Seta
1955	Prix du Reportage Filmé	La grande pêche	Henri Fabiani
1955	Mention Spéciale	Zolotaia Antilopa	Lev Atamanov
1956	Prix du Documentaire	La Corsa delle Roche	Gian Luigi Polidoro
1956	Prix du Documentaire	André Modeste Grétry	Lucien Deroisy
1956	Prix du Film de Fiction	Magdana's Donkey (Lurdzha Magdany)	Tengiz Abuladze, Rezo Chkheidze
1956	Mention Spéciale	The Puppets of Jiri Trnka (Loutky Jiriho Trnky)	Bruno Sefranek
1956	Mention au Film de Recherche	Together	Lorenza Mazzetti
1956	Mention au Film de Recherche	Tant qu'il y aura des bêtes	Braissai
1957	Prix du Documentaire	City of Gold	Colin Low, Wolf Koenig
1957	Prix du Film de Nature	Wiesemsommer	Heinz Sielmann
1957	Mention Spéciale	Ochotniki Iujnikh Morey	S. Kogan
1958	Prix Spécial Ex-aequo	Auf den Spuren des Lebens	Fritz Heydenreich
1958	Prix Spécial Ex-aequo	Nez nam narostla kridla	Jiří Brdečka
1959	Prix Spécial du Jury	Histoire d'un poisson rouge	Edmond Sechan
1959	Prix Ex-aequo	New York, New York	Francis Thompson
1959	Prix Ex-aequo	Zmiana warty (The Changing of the Guard)	Włodzimierz Haupe
1959	Mention	Le petit pecheur de la Mer de Chine	Serge Hanin
1959	Hommage	La mer et les jours	Alain Kaminker
1960s
1960	Prix Ex-aequo	Paris la belle	Pierre Prévert
1960	Prix Ex-aequo	A City Called Copenhagen	Jørgen Roos
1960	Prix Ex-aequo	Universe (French version: Notre univers)	Roman Kroitor, Colin Low
1960	Mention d'Honneur	Dagen Mijner Jaren	Max De Haas
1960	Hommage	Enfants des Courants d'Air	Édouard Luntz
1960	Hommage	Paris la belle	Pierre Prévert
1960	Hommage	Le sourire	Serge Bourguignon
1961	Prix Spécial	Párbaj	Gyula Macskássy
1961	Mention Spéciale de la CST	Fuego en Castilla (Tactilvisión del páramo del espanto)	José Val del Omar
1961	Mention Spéciale de la CST	Folkwangschulen	Herbert Vesely
1962	Prix Spécial du Jury Ex-aequo	Oczekiwanie	Witold Giersz, Ludwik Perski
1962	Prix Spécial du Jury Ex-aequo	Pan	Herman van der Horst
1962	Prix de la CST du Cinéma Français	Oczekiwanie	Witold Giersz, Ludwik Perski
1962	Prix de la CST du Cinéma Français	Les Dieux du Feu	Henri Storck
1963	Prix Spécial du Jury	Moj Stan	Zvonimir Berković
1963	Mention Spéciale du Jury	Di Domenica	Luigi Bazzoni
1963	Mention Spéciale du Jury	You	István Szabó
1963	Prix de la CST	Zeilen	Hattum Hoving
1964	Prix Spécial du Jury Ex-aequo	Help! My Snowman's Burning Down	Carson Davidson
1964	Prix Spécial du Jury Ex-aequo	Sillages	Serge Roullet
1964	Prix de la CST	Dawn of the Capricorn	Ahmad Faroughy-Kadjar
1965	Prix Spécial du Jury	Monsieur Plateau	Jean Brismée
1965	Troisième Prix	Johann Sebastian Bach: Fantasy in G minor	Jan Švankmajer
1965	Prix de la CST	Overture (Nyitany)	János Vadász
1965	Prix de la CST	Ban ye ji jiao (Le Coq Chante à Minuit)	Yeou Lei
1966	Prix de la CST	Skaterdater	Noel Black
1967	Prix Spécial du Jury Ex-aequo	Gloire à Félix Tournachon	André Martin
1967	Prix Spécial du Jury Ex-aequo	Jedan plus jedan jeste tri	Branko Ranitovic
1967	Prix de la CST	Sky Over Holland	John Fernhout
1967	Mention Spéciale de la CST	Versailles	Albert Lamorisse
1969	Prix Spécial du Jury	La Pince à ongles	Jean-Claude Carrière
1969	Mention Spéciale de la CST	Toccata	Herman van der Horst
1969	Mention Spéciale de la CST	Cîntecele Renasterii	Mirel Ilieşiu
1970s
1970	Prix du Jury	The Magic Machines	Bob Curtis
1970	Prix du Jury avec mention	Et Salammbo?	Jean-Pierre Richard
1971	Prix du Jury Ex-æquo	Stuiter	Jan Oonk
1971	Prix du Jury Ex-æquo	Une Statuette	Carlos Vilardebó
1971	Prix spécial du Jury	Star Spangled Banner	Roger Flint
1972	Prix Spécial du Jury	Operation X-70	Raoul Servais
1972	Grand Prix de la CST	Zikkaron	Laurent Coderre
1973	Prix Spécial du Jury	Az 1812-es év	Sándor Reisenbüchler
1974	Prix du Jury	Hunger	Peter Foldes
1975	Prix Spécial du Jury	Daryu tebe zvezdu	Fyodor Khitruk
1976	Premier Prix du Jury	Agulana	Gérald Frydman
1976	Deuxième Prix du Jury	Nightlife	Robin Lehman
1977	Prix Spécial du Jury	Di Cavalcanti	Glauber Rocha
1978	Prix du Jury Ex-aequo	Oh My Darling	Børge Ring
1978	Prix du Jury Ex-aequo	A Doonesbury Special	John Hubley, Faith Hubley and Garry Trudeau
1979	Prix du court métrage - Fiction	La Festa dels bojos	Lluis Racionero Grau
1979	Prix du court métrage - Animation	Bum	Břetislav Pojar
1980s
1980	Prix du Jury Ex-aequo	Krychle	Zdenek Smetana
1980	Prix du Jury Ex-aequo	Canada Vignettes: The Performer	Norma Bailey
1981	Prix du Jury Ex-aequo	Le Rat	Elisabeth Huppert
1981	Prix du Jury Ex-aequo	Zea	André Leduc
1981	Premier Prix du Jury	Zea	André Leduc
1982	Prix du Jury - Animation	Meow	Marcos Magalhães
1983	Prix du Jury Ex-æquo	Too Much Oregano	Kerry Feltham
1983	Prix du Jury Ex-æquo	The Only Forgotten Take of Casablanca	Charly Weller
1984	Premier Prix	Tchouma	David Takaichvili
1986	Prix du Jury - Animation	Gaidouk	Y. Katsap and L. Gorokhov
1986	Prix du Jury - Fiction	Les Petites Magiciennes	Vincent Mercier and Yves Robert
1987	Deuxième Prix	Academy Leader Variations	David Ehrlich
1987	Troisième Prix	Iznenadna I Prerana Smrt Pukovnika K.K.	Milos Radovic
1988	Prix du court métrage - Animation	Traces of Sand (Ab Ovo / Homoknyomok)	Ferenc Cako
1988	Prix du court métrage - Fiction	Physical Sculpture (Sculpture Physique)	Yann Piquer and Jean Marie Maddeddu
1989	Mention Spéciale du Jury Ex-æquo	Yes We Can	Faith Hubley
1989	Mention Spéciale du Jury Ex-æquo	Performance Pieces	Tom Abrams
1990s
1990	Premier Prix du Jury	The Bedroom (De slaapkamer)	Maarten Koopman
1990	Deuxième Prix du Jury	Revestriction	Barthelemy Bompard
1991	Prix Spécial du Jury	Push Comes to Shove	Bill Plympton
1992	Prix Spécial du Jury	La Sensation	Manuel Poutte
1994	Prix du Jury	Lemming Aid	Grant Lahood
1994	Deuxième Prix	Syrup	Paul Unwin
1995	Prix du Jury	Swinger	Gregor Jordan
1996	Prix du Jury	Small Deaths	Lynne Ramsay
1997	Prix du Jury Ex-æquo	Leonie	Lieven Debrauwer
1997	Prix du Jury Ex-æquo	Les Vacances	Emmanuelle Bercot
1998	Prix du Jury Ex-æquo	Horseshoe	David Lodge
1998	Prix du Jury Ex-æquo	Gasman	Lynne Ramsay
1999	Prix du Jury Ex-æquo	So-Poong	Il-Gon Song
1999	Prix du Jury Ex-æquo	Stop	Rodolphe Marconi
2000s
2001	Prix du Jury Ex-æquo	Daddy's Girl	Irvine Allan
2001	Prix du Jury Ex-æquo	Pizza Passionata	Kari Juusonen
2002	Prix du Jury Ex-æquo	A Very Very Silent Film	Manish Jha
2002	Prix du Jury Ex-æquo	The Stone of Folly	Jesse Rosensweet
2003	Prix du Jury	L'Homme Sans Tête	Juan Solanas
2004	Prix du Jury	Flatlife	Jonas Geirnaert
2005	Mention Spéciale	Clara	Van Sowerwine
2006	Prix du Jury	Primera Nieve	Pablo Aguero
2006	Mention Spéciale	Conte de quartier	Florence Miailhe
2007	Mention Spéciale Ex-æquo	Ah Ma	Anthony Chen
2007	Mention Spéciale Ex-æquo	Run	Mark Albiston
2008	Prix du Jury	Jerrycan	Julius Avery
2009	Mention Spéciale	The Six Dollar Fifty Man	Louis Sutherland
2010s
2010	Prix du Jury	Micky Bader	Frida Kempff
2011	Prix du Jury	Badpakje 46	Wannes Destoop
2016	Mention Spéciale	A moça que dançou com o diabo	João Paulo Miranda Maria
2017	Mention Spéciale	The Ceiling	Teppo Airaksinen
2018	Mention Spéciale	On The Border	Wei Shujun
2019	Mention Spéciale	Monster God	Agustina San Martín
2020s
2021	Mention Spéciale	August Sky	Jasmin Tenucci
2022	Mention Spéciale	Lori (Melancholy of my Mother's Lullabies)	Abinash Bikram Shah
2023	Mention Spéciale	Fár	Gunnur Martinsdóttir Schlüter
2024	Mention Spéciale	Bad for a Moment	Daniel Soares
2025	Mention Spéciale	Ali	Adnan Al Rajeev
