= The Sea Ahead =

- Directed by: Ely Dagher
- Written by: Ely Dagher
- Produced by: Arnaud Dommerc
- Starring: Manal Issa; Roger Azar; Yara Abi Haidar; Rabih Al Zaher; Joseph Sassine; Fadi Abi Samra
- Cinematography: Shadi Chaaban
- Edited by: Léa Masson; Ely Dagher
- Music by: Joh Dagher
- Production companies: Andolfi; Abbout Productions; wrong men; Beachside; BeaverAndBeaver
- Release date: July 2021 (Cannes Film Festival)
- Running time: 116 minutes.
- Countries: Lebanon; France; Belgium

The Sea Ahead is a 2021 film directed and written by Ely Dagher. Starring Manal Issa, Roger Azar, Yara Abi Haidar, Rabih Al Zaher, Fadi Abi Samra and Joseph Sassine.

The film had its world premiere at the 2021 Cannes Film Festival in July 2021.

== Plot ==
After a long time gone, Jana, a young woman, suddenly returns to Beirut. She finds herself reconnecting with the familiar yet strange life she had once left.

== Cast ==
- Manal Issa
- Roger Azar
- Yara Abi Haidar
- Rabih Al Zaher
- Joseph Sassine
- Fadi Abi Samra

== Production ==
The working title was "Harvest" before changing to "The sea ahead". Writing of the film started in 2015 and Production at the beginning of 2020, all before the economic collapse of Lebanon. The film was in editing phase at the time of Beirut explosion fall of 2020 the film Participated in the Venice film festival Final cut section for films in post production, and won best film.

== Release ==
The film premiered internationally during the 2021 Cannes Film Festival in July 2021 part of the Directors' Fortnight

== Reception ==
Following the world premiere at the Cannes 53rd Director's fortnight the film by Kaleem Aftab for Cineuropa was described as "taking us on a cinematic journey that echoes work by Michelangelo Antonioni and his view of depression". Davide Abbatescianni, in his review for The New Arab, gave a positive review: "Loosely echoing Michelangelo Antonioni's artistic research on existential angst, The Sea Ahead is an enigmatic psychological drama, tackling timely themes and representing today's new 'lost generation' of millennials with great depth and sincerity."

The film was eligible to receive the Caméra d'Or at Cannes.
