= Sameh Alaa =

Egyptian film director

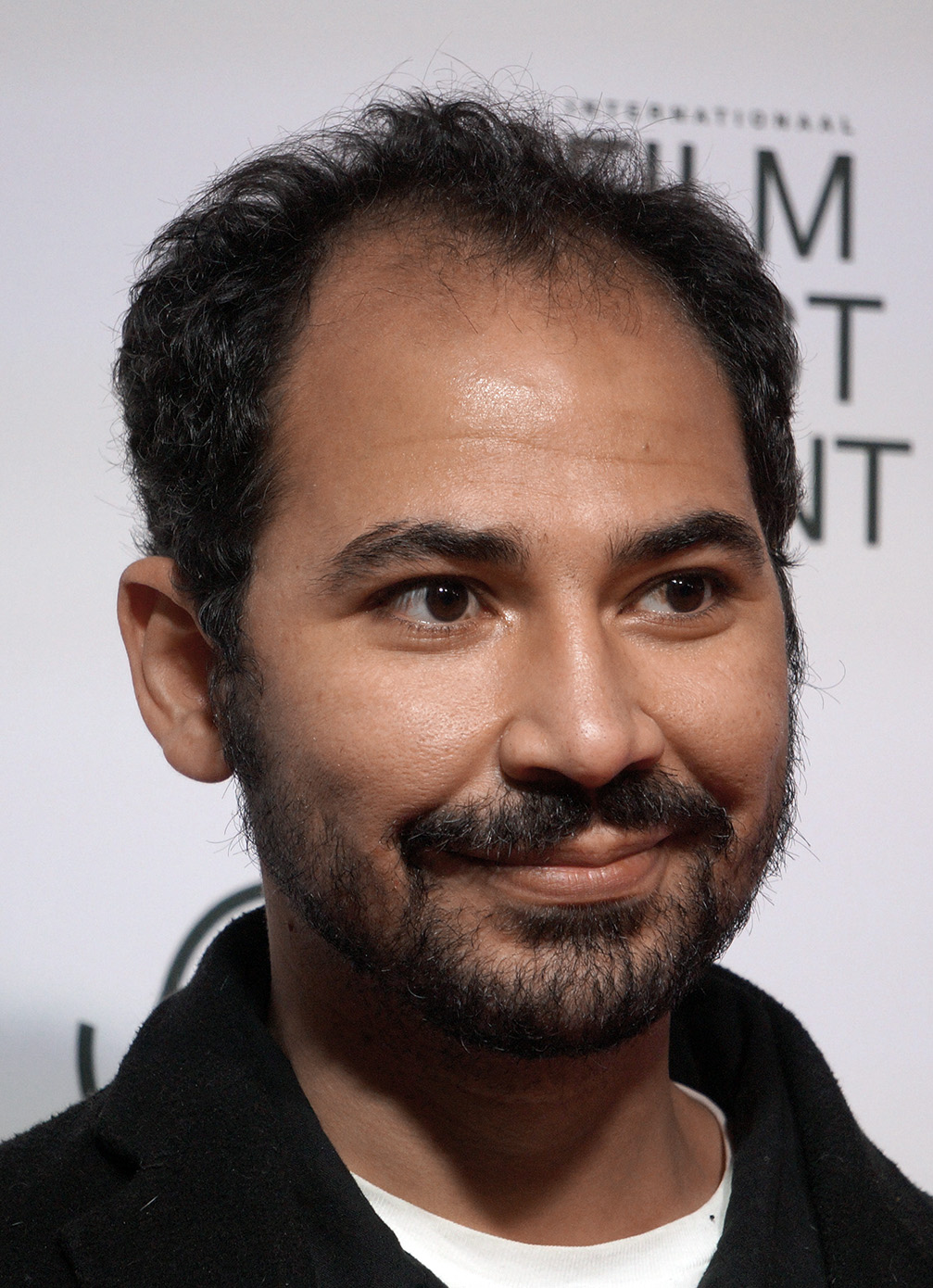
- Sameh Alaa in 2020
- Citizenship: Egypt
- Education: Cairo University
- Occupation: Film director
- Years active: 2010-present

Sameh Alaa is an Egyptian film director. Born in Cairo, he studied at Cairo University, before moving to Europe. In 2020, he became the first Egyptian director to have a film screened in the Short Film Competition section at the Cannes Film Festival. His film, I Am Afraid to Forget Your Face, won the Short Film Palme d'Or at the 2020 Cannes Film Festival, making it the first Egyptian film to achieve this honor. In June 2021, he was named one of the six jury members for the Cinéfondation and Short Films section at the 2021 Cannes Film Festival.
