= Waves '98 =

- Film poster
- Directed by: Ely Dagher
- Written by: Ely Dagher
- Produced by: Ely Dagher
- Music by: Matthew Wilcock
- Animation by: Ely Dagher; Laure Escafadals; Chadi Aoun
- Release date: May 2015
- Running time: 15 minutes
- Countries: Lebanon; Qatar
- Language: Arabic

Waves '98 is a 2015 animated, live-action short film written and directed by Lebanese artist and filmmaker Ely Dagher. It was awarded the Short Film Palme d'Or at the 2015 Cannes Film Festival.

== Plot ==
Omar is a high-school student living in the northern suburbs of Beirut in the late 1990s. Disillusioned with his life in the suburbs of segregated Beirut, Omar's discovery lures him into the depths of the city. Immersed into a world that is so close yet so isolated from his reality that he eventually finds himself struggling to keep his attachments, his sense of home. The film is a meditation on Dagher's relationship to Beirut, his hometown, since he has left it for Brussels.

== Awards ==
- Cannes Film Festival - Short Film Palme d'Or (2015) - Won

== Reception ==
Waves '98 is the first Lebanese film in the official competition at the Cannes Film Festival since Maroun Baghdadi won the Jury Prize for Out of Life in 1991. The film was shortlisted as one of 8 from a list of 4550 short film submissions. The film was awarded the Short Film Palme d'Or by Abderrahmane Sissako in a ceremony on May 24, 2015.
