= 27 (film) =

- Directed by: Flóra Anna Buda
- Written by: Flóra Anna Buda
- Produced by: Emmanuel-Alain Raynal; Pierre Baussaron; Péter Benjámin Lukács; Gábor Osváth
- Starring: Natasa Stork; Ádám Fekete; Franciska Farkas; Simon Szabó
- Production companies: Miyu Productions; Boddah
- Release date: 2023
- Running time: 11 minutes
- Countries: France; Hungary

27 is a 2023 French-Hungarian animated short film directed by Flóra Anna Buda.

== Plot ==
Alice seeks refuge in her dreams, using them as an escape from her stifling everyday existence. Today, she is turning 27 years old, and she still lives with her parents. After taking psychedelics at a party on a factory roof, she falls off her bike on her way home. Injured and hungover, she is forced to face the realities of her life in the city.

== Production ==
Buda, the writer, director and production designer of the film, has spoken publicly about the autobiographical element in her film, and her intentions to open up conversations about the struggle of young people due to the housing crisis in her home country, Hungary.

== Reception ==
Since its release, the film has been selected in various festivals around the world:

Year	Festivals	Award/Category	Status
2023	Cannes Film Festival	Palme d'Or for Best Short Film	Won
2023	Cannes Film Festival	Queer Palm for Best Short Film	Nominated
2023	Sarajevo Film Festival	Heart of Sarajevo Award for Best Short Film	Won
2023	Melbourne International Film Festival	Best Animation Short Film	Won
2023	Annecy International Animation Festival	Cristal Award for Best Short Film	Won
2023	Animasyros	Grand Prix	Won
2024	Sundance	Official Selection	Nominated
2026	International Cycling Film Festival	Goldene Kurbel for Best Film	Won

== Accolades ==
The 11-minute short premiered at the 2023 Cannes Film Festival, where it won the Palme d'Or Award for Best Short Film. The film also won the Cristal Award for Best Short at the 2023 Annecy International Animation Film Festival.

27 has been featured in a number of international film festivals, such as the Toronto International Film Festival, Telluride Film Festival, the Sarajevo Film Festival and the Melbourne International Film Festival. The film is also in the official selection for the 2024 César Awards.
