= Last Words (2020 film) =

2020 drama film

- Film poster
- Directed by: Jonathan Nossiter
- Written by: Jonathan Nossiter; Santiago Amigorena
- Produced by: Serge Lalou; Laurent Baujard; Donatella Palermo
- Starring: Nick Nolte; Kalipha Touray; Charlotte Rampling; Stellan Skarsgård; Alba Rohrwacher
- Cinematography: Clarissa Cappellani
- Edited by: Jonathan Nossiter
- Music by: Tom Smail
- Production companies: Les Films d'Ici; Paprika Films; Stemal Entertainment; Sagax Entertainment; Rai Cinema; Les Films du Rat
- Release date: September 6, 2020 (Deauville)
- Running time: 126 minutes
- Countries: France; Italy; United States
- Language: English

Last Words is a 2020 internationally co-produced drama film directed by Jonathan Nossiter. It was selected to be shown at the 2020 Cannes Film Festival. It premiered at the Deauville American Film Festival on 6 September 2020.

== Cast ==
- Nick Nolte as Shakespeare
- Kalipha Touray as Kal
- Charlotte Rampling as Batlk
- Alba Rohrwacher as Dima
- Stellan Skarsgård as Zyberski
- Maryam d'Abo
- Silvia Calderoni as Anna
