= Amparo (film) =

- Directed by: Simón Mesa Soto
- Produced by: Juan Sarmiento; Héctor Ulloque
- Starring: Sandra Melissa Torres; Diego Alejandro Tobón; John Jairo Montoya; Luciana Gallego; Adriana Vergara
- Production companies: Ocúltimo; Medio de Contención
- Release date: 2021
- Running time: 95 minutes
- Country: Colombia
- Language: Spanish

Amparo is a 2021 Colombian drama film directed by Simón Mesa Soto and starring Sandra Melissa Torres, Diego Alejandro Tobón, Luciana Gallego, John Jairo Montoya and Adriana Vergara. Before arriving in Colombian theaters, the film participated in several international events like the Cannes, Chicago, Punta el Este and Lima film festivals, where it received awards and nominations.

== Plot ==
Elías, Amparo's eldest son, has just come of age and is eligible for compulsory military service, at a time when Colombia is immersed in a deep armed conflict and in a remote region where there seems to be no God and no law. Amparo knows that it is very likely that her son will not survive, and she begins to look for all kinds of solutions to save Elías from that fate. But there is a problem: Amparo only has one day to do it.

== Cast ==
- Sandra Melissa Torres as Amparo
- Diego Alejandro Tobón as Elías
- John Jairo Montoya as Víctor
- Luciana Gallego as Karen
- Adriana Vergara as Lucía

== Awards and nominations ==
| Year | Event | Award/Category | Receptor | Result | Ref. |
|---|---|---|---|---|---|
| 2021 | Cannes Film Festival | Louis Roederer Foundation Award | Sandra Melissa Torres | Won | |
| 2021 | Cannes Film Festival | Critics' Week Grand Prize | Simón Mesa Soto | Nominated | |
| 2021 | Cannes Film Festival | Golden Camera | Simón Mesa Soto | Nominated | |
| 2021 | Chicago International Film Festival | Silver Hugo | Amparo | Won | |
| 2021 | Elcine | International Critics Jury Award | Amparo | Won | |
| 2021 | Jerusalem Film Festival | Best internacional debut | Simón Mesa Soto | Nominated | |
| 2022 | Punta del Este Film Festival | Best actress | Sandra Melissa Torres | Won | |
| 2022 | Miami International Film Festival | Jordan Ressler Award | Simón Mesa Soto | Nominated | |
| 2022 | Pingyao International Film Festival | Audience Award | Simón Mesa Soto | Nominated | |
| 2022 | San Sebastián International Film Festival | Horizons Award | Simón Mesa Soto | Nominated | |
