= James Lasdun =

English novelist and poet (born 1958)

James Lasdun (born 8 June 1958) is an English novelist and poet.

== Life and career ==
Lasdun was born in London, the son of Susan (Bendit) and British architect Sir Denys Lasdun. Lasdun has written four novels, including The Horned Man, 2002, a New York Times Notable Book, and Seven Lies, 2006, which was an Economist Book of the Year and was longlisted for the Man Booker Prize for fiction. He has published four collections of short stories, including The Siege: Selected Stories, the title story of which was adapted for film by Bernardo Bertolucci as Besieged in 1998. His collection It's Beginning To Hurt, 2009 was chosen as a Best Book of the Year by The Los Angeles Times, the Wall Street Journal, the Library Journal and the Atlantic. Lasdun has written four books of poetry, one of which, Landscape with Chainsaw, was a finalist for the T. S. Eliot Prize, the Forward Prize and the Los Angeles Times Book Prize. It was also selected as a TLS International Book of the Year. He is the winner of the 2026 biennial Katherine Anne Porter Prize, awarded by the American Academy of Arts and Letters, and an Emmy (Best Limited Series) as Executive Producer of HBO's 2026 miniseries, DTF St Louis, inspired by his New Yorker article "My Dentist's Murder Trial: Adultery, False Identities, and a Lethal Sedation".

In 2013 he published a memoir: Give Me Everything You Have: On Being Stalked, described by Rebecca Mead in the New Yorker as "a rigorous and moving and very elegantly wrought examination of obsession, relentlessness, power, envy and ambition". In 2022 he began covering the Murdaugh murders in South Carolina for The New Yorker, publishing a book on the case in 2026, The Family Man: Blood and Betrayal in the House of Murdaugh (Norton), of which the New York Times critic Orlando Whitfield wrote 'Not since "Midnight in the Garden of Good and Evil" have I read so vividly wrought an account of the South', and which was described by Laura Miller in Slate as 'The Truman Capote version of the Murdaugh story.'

With Jonathan Nossiter, Lasdun co-wrote the film Sunday in 1997, based on his story Ate Menos or The Miracle, winning both the Best Feature Award and the Waldo Salt Best Screenplay Award at Sundance. Together they also wrote the next Nossiter film Signs and Wonders in 2000, starring Charlotte Rampling and Stellan Skarsgard, selected for the official selection of the 50th Berlin International Film Festival in 2000.

His reviews and essays have appeared in Harper's, Granta, the London Review of Books, The Guardian and The New Yorker.

With his wife, Pia Davis, Lasdun has written two guidebooks dedicated to the combined pleasures of walking and eating: one in Tuscany and Umbria, the other in Provence.

He has taught creative writing at Princeton, New York University, the New York State Writers' Institute, the New School, Columbia University and Bennington College.

Critical appraisals of his work include reviews by James Wood in The Guardian, Gabriele Annan in The New York Review of Books and Johanna Thomas-Corr in The Observer.

== Bibliography ==
=== Novels ===
- Lasdun, James (2002). The horned man. London: Jonathan Cape.
- — (2005). Seven Lies. W. W. Norton. ISBN 978-0-393-32908-7. Paperback.
- — (2016). The Fall Guy. W. W. Norton. ISBN 978-0-393-29232-9. Hardcover.
- — (2019). Victory: Two Novellas. London: Jonathan Cape. Contains Feathered Glory and Afternoon of a Faun.

=== Short fiction ===
Collections

- Lasdun, James (1986). Delirium Eclipse. a.k.a. The Silver Age, 1985.
- — (1992). Three Evenings. Farrar Straus Giroux. ISBN 9780374208875.
- — (2000). "The Siege". Selected Stories. (a.k.a. Besieged (paperback), WW Norton, 2000, ISBN 978-0-393-32074-9.
- — (2010). It's Beginning To Hurt. Picador. ISBN 978-0-312-42986-7. Paperback.

=== Poetry ===
Collections

- Lasdun, James (1988). A Jump Start.
- —; Hofmann, Michael (1995). After Ovid: New Metamorphoses.
- — (1997). Woman Police Officer in Elevator.
- — (July 2001). Landscape with Chainsaw (hardcover) (1st ed.). United States: WW Norton & Co. ISBN 978-0-393-01963-6.
- — (2012). Water Sessions. Jonathan Cape. ISBN 978-0-224-09709-3. Paperback.
- — (2015). Bluestone: New and Selected Poems. Farrar, Straus and Giroux. ISBN 9780374220556.

=== Nonfiction ===
- Lasdun, James (2013). Give Me Everything You Have: On Being Stalked. Farrar, Straus & Giroux. ISBN 978-0-374-21907-9.
- — (2017). "Appointment with death: my dentist's baroque fantasy life landed him in serious trouble". Annals of Crime. The New Yorker. Vol. 93, no. 19. pp. 30–37.
- Lasdun, James (2026) The Family Man: Blood and Betrayal in the House of Murdaugh. Norton

=== Miscellaneous ===
- Lasdun, James; Nossiter, Jonathan, Sunday (Screenplay).
- —; Nossiter, Jonathan (1891), "Signs and Wonders", The Observatory (Screenplay), 14: 236, Bibcode:1891Obs....14..236N.
- —; Chekhov, Anton. "Introduction". Collected Stories. Folio.
- —. "Introduction". St Mawr by DH Lawrence. Penguin.
- —. "Introduction". As A Man Grows Older by Italo Svevo. NYRB.
- —. "Introduction". Amerika by Franz Kafka. Folio.
- —. "Introduction". Selected Stories of Paul Bowles. Penguin.
- —; Davis, Pia (28 September 2004). Walking and Eating in Tuscany and Umbria (paperback) (revised ed.). Penguin. ISBN 978-0-14-100900-1.
- —; Davis, Pia (6 May 2008). Walking and Eating in Provence. Moon Handbooks. Avalon. ISBN 978-1-59880-063-0. Paperback.

== Honors ==
- Winner of the Dylan Thomas Prize (short stories)
- Recipient of Guggenheim Fellowship in poetry (1997)
- Winner (with Jonathan Nossiter) of the Sundance Waldo Salt Best Screenplay Award for the film Sunday
- Winner (1999) of the London Times Literary Supplement Poetry Competition
- Winner of the inaugural BBC National Short Story Award (May 2006) for his story An Anxious Man
- Fellow of the Royal Society of Literature (2010)
- Winner of the biennial Katherine Anne Porter Prize (awarded by the American Academy of Arts and Letters), 2026
- Gotham Award for Best Limited Series (Executive Producer), DTF St Louis, 2026
- Emmy Award for Best Limited Series (Executive Producer), DTF St Louis, 2026
