= Simón Mesa Soto =

Colombian film director and screenwriter

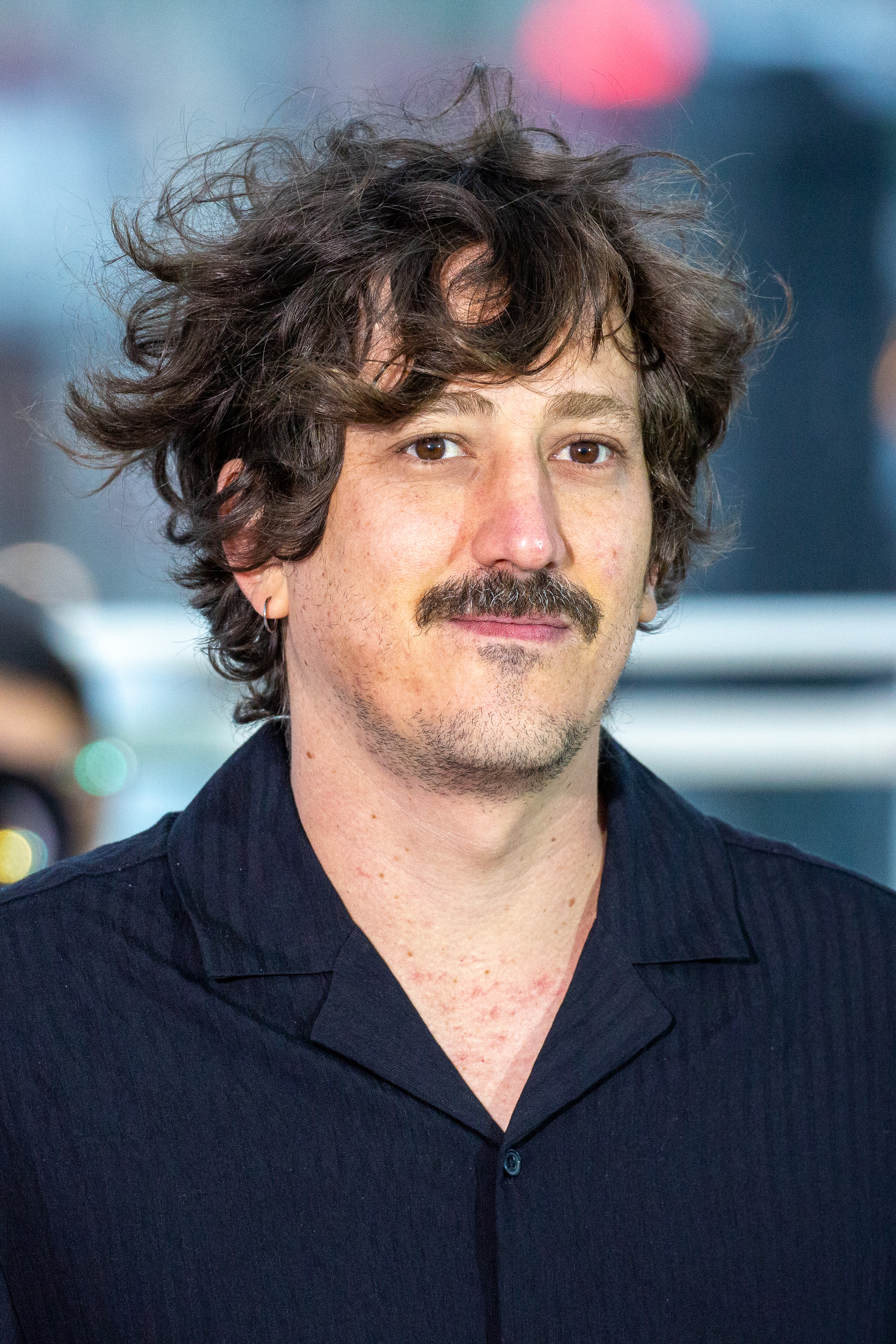
- Soto at the 2025 Cannes Film Festival
- Born: Medellín, Colombia
- Occupations: Film director, screenwriter
- Years active: 2014–present

Simón Mesa Soto, is a Colombian film director and screenwriter known for his short films Leidi and Madre, and his first feature film Amparo, which had its premiere at the 2021 Cannes Film Festival.

== Early years ==
Simón Mesa Soto was born in Medellín, Colombia. Studied Audiovisual Communication at Universidad de Antioquia, where he also worked as lecturer in film editing before moving to the UK. In 2014 finished his studies in filmmaking at London Film School. Leidi was his graduation project.

== Career ==
His film Leidi won the Short Film Palme d'Or at the 2014 Cannes Film Festival.

== Filmography ==
=== Feature films ===
- Amparo (2021)
- A Poet (2025)

=== Short films ===
- Los tiempos muertos (2009)
- Leidi (2014)
- Madre (2016)
