= Ely Dagher =

Lebanese director (born 1985)

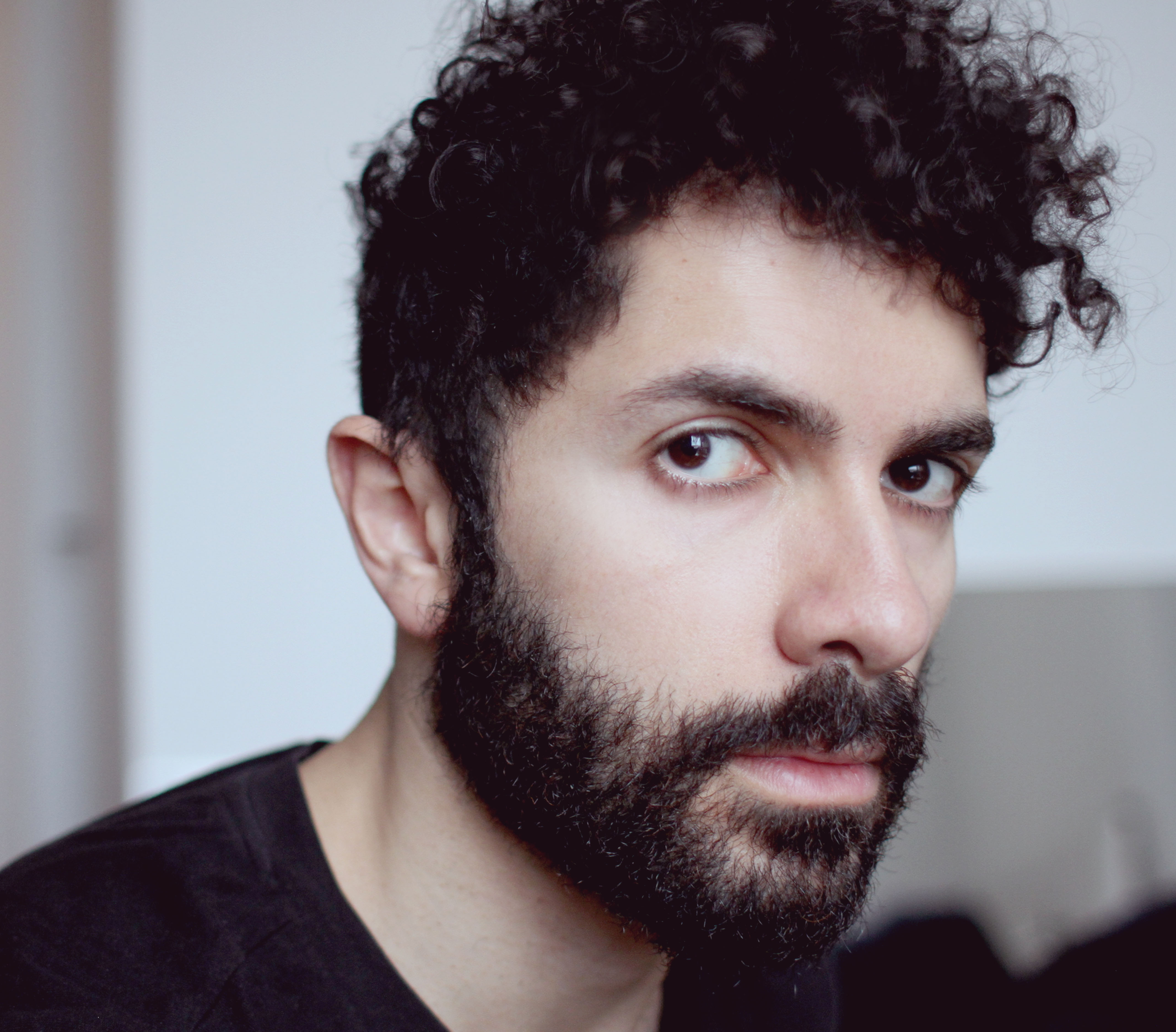
- Born: Beirut, Lebanon
- Occupations: Film director, producer

Ely Dagher is a Lebanese director, screenwriter and artist known for his short film Waves '98 and most recently his first feature film The Sea Ahead which had its premiere at the 2021 Cannes Film Festival

== Early years ==
Ely graduated from Goldsmiths College in 2009 with a master's degree in Art and Media Cultures. Previously he had received a bachelor's degree in graphic arts and illustration as well as a Bachelors in animation at the Academie Libanaise Des Beaux Arts in Lebanon.

== Career ==
Dagher's film Waves '98 won the Short Film Palme d'Or at the 2015 Cannes Film Festival, becoming the first Lebanese film to ever receive the award.

In February 2020 Dagher completed shooting his first feature film, The Sea Ahead (Al Bahr Amamakoum), with post-production finishing a year afterwards in March 2021. Owing to the devastating economic crisis in Beirut, COVID-19 and the Beirut port explosion the post production was halted for two months. The film had its premiere at the Cannes Film Festival part of the 53rd Directors' Fortnight.

== Filmography ==
- Waves '98 (short), 2015
- The Sea Ahead, 2021
