= Signs and Wonders (film) =

2000 film by Jonathan Nossiter

- Film Poster
- Directed by: Jonathan Nossiter
- Written by: Jonathan Nossiter; James Lasdun
- Starring: Stellan Skarsgård; Charlotte Rampling; Deborah Kara Unger
- Music by: Adrian Utley
- Release date: 2000
- Running time: 105 minutes
- Country: France
- Language: English / Greek
- Box office: $33,842 (domestic)

Signs and Wonders is a 2000 psychological thriller directed by Jonathan Nossiter and co-written with British poet James Lasdun (also co-writer of Sunday) was inspired by the Polish novel Cosmos by Witold Gombrowicz.

It stars Stellan Skarsgård, Charlotte Rampling and Deborah Kara Unger.

== Summary ==
In Athens, an expatriate American businessman struggles to find coherence in his radical "pursuit of happiness". Alec Fenton (Skarsgård) is a happily married man with two children who nonetheless is maintaining a torrid affair with colleague Katherine (Unger). At the start of the film, impelled by signs clearly decipherable to him, he abruptly ends the liaison after voluntarily confessing its existence to his wife Marjorie (Rampling). But after he accidentally runs into Katherine six months later while on a family skiing vacation abroad, he decides to leave his wife and children and return to the United States with his fated lover. But on learning from Katherine that their meeting was not an accident but a product of her design, he abandons her a second time and rushes back to Athens to try to salvage his family relations. On his return however, he discovers that Marjorie, who works at the US embassy, has taken up with a Greek political activist, Andreas (Dimitri Katalifos), survivor of the US-sponsored years of Greek military dictatorship.

The urban chaos of Athens becomes the catalyst for the struggles between these American expatriates and their Greek hosts.

== Production ==
Produced by MK2 in Paris, with Nick Wechsler and Jed Alpert in the United States, it was one of the first larger budget films (reportedly $5,000,000) to use digital cameras for eventual blowup to 35 MM. Nossiter worked with Tommaso Vergallo (also his chief image collaborator on Mondovino), one of the founders of blowup pioneer Swiss Effects, to create a textured, 1970s' grainy edge look in the transformation from digital to film.

== Filming ==
Shot entirely on location in Athens and the northern region of Epirus in Greece as well as short sequences in Vermont and New York State, the film also marked the return to the big screen of Charlotte Rampling after several years' hiatus.

== Music ==
The music is composed by Adrian Utley of the British group Portishead.

== Release ==
It premiered in competition at the Berlin Film Festival in 2000 and was released in France the same year by MK2 and in the United States by Strand Releasing in 2001.

== Critical reception ==
It was hailed by Cahiers du Cinéma as one of the ten best films of the year.

== Sources and references ==
- THE TORONTO EYE
- CHICAGO SUN TIMES:
- PHILADELPHIA CITY PAPER, August 2–9, 2001
- 24 IMAGES (issue n° 105 p. 38-44), Interview with Jonathan Nossiter by Gérard Grugeau
- CAHIERS DU CINEMA (March, 2000)
- MAKING MISCHIEF (2001): DVD Bonus documentary director's diary of making of "Signs & Wonders" included on Strand Releasing DVD of film.
