= I Am Afraid to Forget Your Face =

- Arabic: ستاشر
- Directed by: Sameh Alaa
- Written by: Sameh Alaa; Mohamed Fawzy
- Produced by: Muhammad Taymour; Mark Lotfy
- Starring: Seif Hemeda; Nourhan Ahmed; Yousef Elrashidy; Om Dalia
- Cinematography: Giorgos Valsamis
- Edited by: Yasser Azmy
- Production companies: Fig Leaf Studios; Les Cigognes
- Distributed by: Square Eyes
- Release date: 10 September 2020 (Uppsala)
- Running time: 15 minutes
- Countries: Egypt; France; Qatar; Belgium
- Language: Arabic

I Am Afraid to Forget Your Face (Arabic: ستاشر) is a short drama film, directed by Sameh Alaa and released in 2020. A coproduction of companies from Egypt, France, Qatar and Belgium, the film stars Seif Hemeda as Adam, a young man who has been separated from his girlfriend for 82 days after being kept apart by their families, and is willing to go to almost any lengths necessary to reunite with her.

The film features a few lines of Arabic language dialogue, but is told almost entirely without speech.

The film premiered at the Uppsala International Short Film Festival in September 2020, and was screened at the 68th San Sebastián International Film Festival.

It was selected for the short film competition at the 2020 Cannes Film Festival; despite the overall cancellation of the event due to the COVID-19 pandemic, the short film competition proceeded as an outdoor screening series on the Croisette in October. At the conclusion of the series, it was named the winner of the Short Film Palme d'Or.
