= Sunday (1997 film) =

- Theatrical release poster
- Directed by: Jonathan Nossiter
- Written by: James Lasdun; Jonathan Nossiter
- Starring: David Suchet; Lisa Harrow
- Release dates: January 1997 (Sundance); August 22, 1997 (U.S.)
- Running time: 91 minutes
- Country: United States
- Language: English

Sunday is a 1997 American independent film directed by Jonathan Nossiter. The screenplay is an adaptation by Nossiter and James Lasdun of Lasdun's own short story "Ate, Memos or the Miracle" (published in his collection of stories, Three Evenings). The two would later collaborate again on Signs and Wonders.

== Plot ==
Set in Queens, a borough of New York City, it is a dark comedy about an unemployed, homeless IBM functionary mistaken by an aging actress for film director Matthew Delacorta.

== Production ==
Starring David Suchet (who reportedly added 40 pounds for his role), as well as Lisa Harrow and Jared Harris, it was shot on location in Queens and in an active homeless shelter, blending actors and non-actors.

== Cast ==
- Arnold Barkus—Andy
- Jared Harris—Ray
- Bahman Soltani—Abram
- Willis Burks II—Selwyn (as Willis Burks)
- Joseph Sirola—Joe Subalowsky (as Joe Sirola)
- Henry Hayward—Sam
- Kevin Thigpen—David
- Chen Tsun Kit—Himself
- Lisa Harrow—Madeleine Vesey
- Larry Pine—Ben Vesey
- Yeon Joo Kim—Suky Vesey
- Fran Capo—Judy, Madeleine's Friend
- Spencer Paterson—Johnny O
- Joe Grifasi—Scottie Elster
- Jimmy Broadway—himself
- David Suchet—Oliver/Matthew Delacorta

== Awards ==
The film won the 1997 Sundance Film Festival Grand Jury prize for Best Film and Best Screenplay. It also won the Deauville Film Festival Grand Prize for Best Film and its International Critics' prize. It marked Nossiter's debut at Cannes in the "Un Certain Regard" section (his 2004 Mondovino was in competition for the Palme d'Or) and was also included in The Museum of Modern Art's New Directors/New Films Festival.

Awards
Preceded by Welcome to the Dollhouse	Sundance Grand Jury Prize: U.S. Dramatic; 1997	Succeeded by Slam
