= Leidi =

- Film poster
- Directed by: Simón Mesa Soto
- Written by: Simón Mesa Soto
- Produced by: Diana Patiño Martínez
- Starring: Alejandra Montoya Villa
- Cinematography: Juan Sarmiento G.
- Edited by: Ricardo Saraiva
- Release date: May 23, 2014 (Cannes Film Festival)
- Running time: 15 minutes
- Country: Colombia
- Language: Spanish

Leidi is a 2014 Colombian short drama film directed by Simón Mesa Soto. It won the Short Film Palme d'Or at the 2014 Cannes Film Festival.

== Synopsis ==
Leidi lives with her mom and her baby. Her boyfriend, Alexis, hasn't shown up in days. That sunny morning, after she's bathed her baby, Leidi is sent to buy plantains. Outside, a guy tells her he has seen Alexis with another girl. Leidi won't return home until she finds the father of her child.

== Cast ==
- Alejandra Montoya Villa as Leidi
- Héctor Alfredo Orrego as Alexis

== See also ==
- Short Film Palme d'Or
