= Teymur Hajiyev =

Azerbaijani film director, producer, and writer

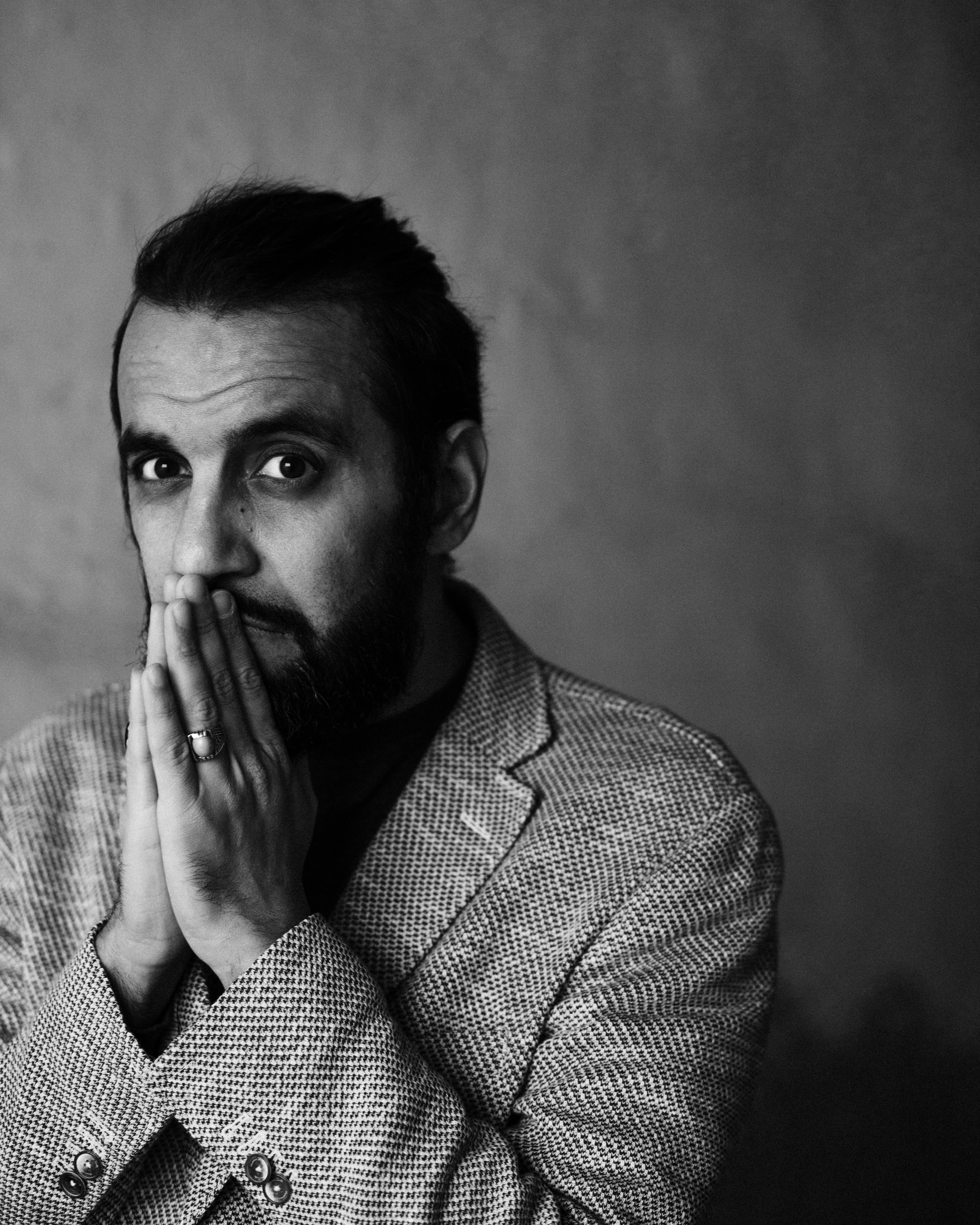
- Born: August 28, 1982 (age 44); Baku, Azerbaijan SSR
- Education: West Texas A&M University
- Occupations: Director; writer; producer
- Years active: 2013—present
- Notable work: Towards Evening

Teymur Hajiyev (Azerbaijani: Teymur Hacıyev) is an Azerbaijani film director, producer, voting member of the European Film Academy and Locarno Filmmakers Academy alumnus.

== Biography ==
Hajiyev was born on August 28, 1982, in Baku, Azerbaijan SSR. After graduating from West Texas A&M University in 2006, and before moving into filmmaking, he worked as a marketing director within various commercial entities in Azerbaijan.

Hajiyev produced several short films through his company FIL Production, including Torn (2014) by the Academy Award winner Elmar Imanov (premiered at the Cannes Quinzaine des Realisateurs in 2014). He premiered the first movie that he directed, the short film The Wound, at the Palm Springs ShortsFest in 2013. His second short film, Shanghai, Baku, premiered at the Tampere Film Festival in 2016, and his third, Salt, Pepper to Taste, at the International Film Festival Rotterdam in 2019. The latter movie was included in Kinoscope’s “Top Five Shorts of 2019".

Towards Evening was the first Azeri film included in the Critics' Week section of the Cannes Film Festival, featuring there in 2020. Hajiyev is the only Azerbaijani filmmaker to have participated at Cannes as a director and a producer.

== Filmography ==
=== As writer/director/producer ===
- Towards Evening (FIL Production/Mandarin Agency) 2020
- Salt, Pepper to Taste (FIL Production) 2019
- Shanghai, Baku (FIL Production/LUPA LT) 2016
- The Wound (FIL Production/CineX) 2014

=== As producer ===
- Gukhuroba (SPLIT Production/FIL Production) 2020
- Torn (FIL Production/Color of May) 2014

=== As actor ===
- Towards Evening (supporting role — "Man") 2020
