= Flóra Anna Buda =

Hungarian film director

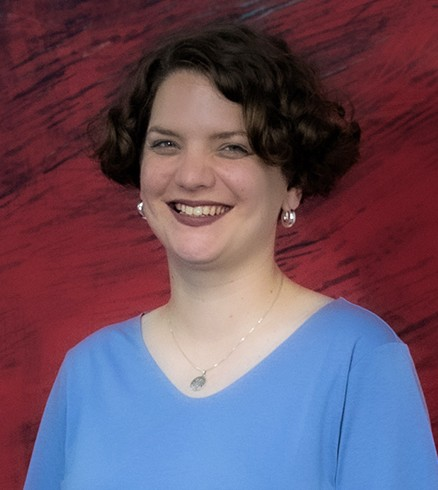
- Buda in 2024
- Born: Budapest, Hungary
- Citizenship: Hungarian
- Occupations: Film director; art director; script writer; visual artist
- Known for: 27
- Awards: Palme d'Or du court métrage, Teddy Bear Award

Flóra Anna Buda (born March 4, 1991) is a Hungarian film director and animator based in Paris, France. She is mostly known for writing and directing the multi-award-winning short film 27, which premiered at the Cannes Film Festival in 2023, where it won the Palme d'Or du court métrage. Buda has also written and directed the award-winning short film Entropia (2019), which was her university graduation project at MOME.

== Career ==
Buda studied animation at MOME (Budapest, Hungary) and graduated in 2014 with a bachelor's degree in animation and in 2018 with a master's degree in animation.

After completing her studies, she began an internship at MIYU Productions, where she later became a film director.

Between 2018 and 2019, Buda participated in the European-Union-funded programme 'Animation Sans Frontières', an international animation workshop at the École de l'image GOBELINS in Paris, France; the Filmakademie Baden Württemberg in Ludwigsburg, Germany; The Animation Workshop in Viborg, Denmark; the MOME in Budapest, Hungary.

Buda also took part in two artist residencies between 2020 and 2022: she attended the Open Workshop, and international residency for animation directors at The Animation Workshop, and the International residency for animation directors CICLIC, in Vendôme, France.

Her first professional film, 27, was completed in 2023 and premiered at Cannes Film Festival on the same year.

== Filmography ==
- Entropia (2019) - director, art director, screenwriter
- 27 (2023) - director, screenwriter, art director, background designer, layout artist, animator

== Recognition ==
Buda's Master's final project Entropia received the Teddy Bear Award at the 69th Berlinale in 2019.

Her film 27 won the Short Film Palme d'Or at the 2023 Cannes Film Festival and the Cristal Award at the 2023 Annecy International Animation Film Festival. In 2023, the film was nominated to the European Film Awards for Best European Short Film, and shortlisted to the 2024 César Awards. On December 21, 2023, 27 was also shortlisted to the 96th Academy Awards.
