= Jonathan Nossiter =

American filmmaker

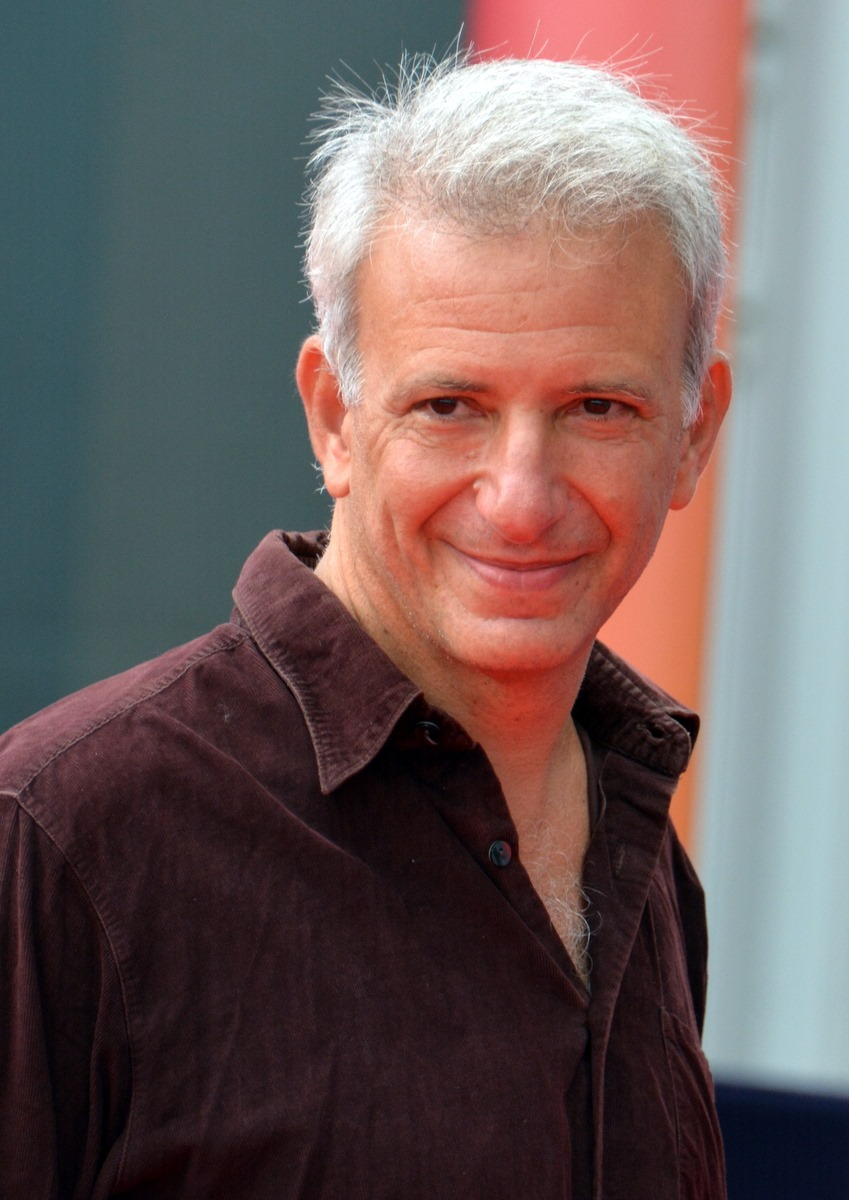
- Nossiter in 2020
- Born: 1961 (age 64–65)
- Education: École des Beaux-Arts; B.A. Dartmouth College
- Occupation: film producer
- Parent: Bernard Nossiter

Jonathan Nossiter (born 1961) is an American filmmaker.

== Early life and education ==
Nossiter was born to a Jewish family in the United States in 1961, the son of Washington Post and New York Times foreign correspondent Bernard Nossiter. He was raised in France, England, Italy, Greece and India. He studied painting at the Beaux Arts in Paris and at the San Francisco Art Institute, as well as Ancient Greek at Dartmouth College (Phi Beta Kappa, Senior Fellow.) After work as an assistant director in the theatre in England (The Newcastle Playhouse, King's Head), he went to New York where he landed a job moving office furniture for the film Fatal Attraction, which led to a position as assistant to the director Adrian Lyne for the length of the shoot.

== Film career ==
It was during the filming that Nossiter met Quentin Crisp, who later became the star of his first feature film, Resident Alien, a hybrid fiction-documentary also starring John Hurt and Holly Woodlawn. Theatrically released in 1991, after premieres at the Berlin and Toronto Film Festivals, Resident Alien, which he wrote, produced and directed, is a comic portrait of the last, tattered days of New York's bohemian underground. It was rereleased in 2005 on DVD in the US in an edition with a later, twinned film Losing The Thread, a documentary about Lorenzo Pezzatini, an italian artist based in Florence, Italy. His second feature film Sunday (1997), which he produced with Alix Madigan, co-wrote with James Lasdun and directed, won the Sundance Film Festival's Grand Jury Prize for Best Film and Waldo Salt award for Best Screenplay and the Deauville Film Festival's Grand Prize for Best Film and their International Critics' Prize, as well as earning a selection in Un Certain Regard in Cannes. Starring David Suchet, Sunday is a dark romantic comedy about the travails of an unemployed IBM employee among the homeless in Queens and his fairy tale one day love affair with an ageing actress.

Nossiter's subsequent feature, Signs and Wonders (2000), starred Charlotte Rampling and Stellan Skarsgård. Shot in Greece and produced by MK2 and Nick Wechsler (the only film Nossiter did not act as a producer), this psychological thriller was nominated for a Golden Bear at the Berlin Festival in 2000.

His fourth feature film, Mondovino (2004), which he produced, directed, shot and edited, is a documentary set in the real world of wine. It was nominated for the Palme d'Or in Cannes in 2004 (one of only four documentaries ever nominated in the history of the festival). It was also the only documentary ever nominated for Best European Film at the Césars in 2005. A 10 part series derived from the feature, which he also directed and produced, was given a gala premiere at the Museum of Modern Art in New York and released by Diaphana on DVD in France in 2006. It was released in the US in 2007 and has been shown on television in more than 20 countries.

Nossiter's other films include Losing The Thread for RAI in Italy and the Sundance Channel in the US (premiere Rotterdam Festival 2001) and Searching for Arthur, a look at Arthur Penn in New York, for Telepiu's Italian series Directors on Directors (premiere at Locarno Festival 1997).

His most recent films are Rio Sex Comedy, a comedy from 2010, and Last Words, a drama from 2020.

== Wine ==
A trained sommelier, in parallel to his film career, he has made wine lists and trained staffs for a variety of restaurants in New York, Paris and Rio de Janeiro, including Balthazar, “Rice”, “Il Buco” “Man Ray”, “Roberta Sudbrack”, Claude Troisgros and “Aprazivel”.

His book Taste & Power: The wine world wars, (French: Le Goût et le Pouvoir), was published in 2007 by Editions Grasset in France, drawing varied reactions from the wine community, including Robert M. Parker, Jr who accused Nossiter of stupidity and bigotry.

An English edition of the book, entitled Liquid Memory and translated by Nossiter, was published by Atlantic Books in 2010.

== See also ==
- List of wine personalities
