= Isabel Lamberti =

Dutch film director

Isabel Lamberti is a Dutch film director who works in a hybrid of documentary and fiction.

== Career ==
Lamberti is a graduate of film theory and directing programs at the New York University Tisch School of the Arts, and the Netherlands Film Academy. Her feature film debut is a Spanish-language film, La Última Primavera (The Last Days of Spring). She won the New Directors’ Award at the 2020 San Sebastian Film Festival for her film Last La Última Primavera. The subject of the film is a family that lives in Cañada Real in Madrid, the largest informal settlement in Europe. The film was selected for the 2020 edition of the ACID programme in Cannes.

== Filmography ==
- Vuurrood - Documentary short, 2014
- Volando Voy - Documentary short, 2015
- Amor - Short film, 2017
- Father - Short film, 2019
- Skam Netherlands - TV series (5 episodes), 2018
- Last Days of Spring (La Última Primavera) - 2020
