= All the Crows in the World =

2021 Hong Kong short film by Tang Yi

- Promotional poster
- Directed by: Tang Yi
- Written by: Tang Yi
- Produced by: Li Haozheng
- Starring: Xuanyu Chen; Baohe Xue; Shujun Huang; Zhengyi Liu; Ge Wu
- Music by: Lemon Guo
- Production company: Fresh Wave
- Distributed by: Premium Films
- Release date: 13 June 2021 (Hong Kong)
- Running time: 14 minutes
- Country: Hong Kong
- Language: Mandarin

All the Crows in the World is a 2021 Hong Kong short drama film, directed and written by Tang Yi. The film stars Xuanyu Chen, Baohe Xue, ShuJun Huang, Zengyi Liu, and Ge Wu. The 14-minute film was screened at the Fresh Wave International Short Film Festival, the Winterthur International Short Film Festival, the New York Asian Film Festival, the Mulan International Film Festival, and the Molodist Kyiv International Film Festival. The film won Best Screenplay and Best Director at the Fresh Wave International Short Film Festival, as well as Best Film at the 74th Cannes Film Festival. The story follows an 18-year-old school girl named Shengnan as she adventures into the night of the adults' world.

== Plot ==
The film is set in Hong Kong and opens with two girls sitting together eating bowls of sweet potato soup. The girls overhear a married man purchasing the services of a prostitute, one girl is named Shengnan Zhao (Xuanyu Chen), and she begins to time him and they place bets with her friend Lily (Zhengyi Liu) on how long he will last in bed with her. Suddenly a man with a megaphone comes up and informs Shengnan that her cousin (Shujun Huang) has invited her to dinner.

While walking to meet her cousin for dinner, Shengnan becomes aware of three men behind her staring at her. Feeling uncomfortable, she lets out an awkward yell and runs off to meet her cousin. As she enters the restaurant she sees Jianguo Wang (Baohe Xue). They share an awkward stare, and Shengnan zips up her hoodie.

When Shengnan gets to the table where her cousin is singing for many businessmen, Shengnan joins and begins singing awkwardly. Her cousin begins to tell the many businessmen including Jianguo Wang about her academic success and how well she is doing in school. All the men rush to give Shengnan red envelopes with money inside, except Jianguo Wang who places his on the rotating center and spins it towards Shengnan. Jianguo notices the head businessman; Mr. Liu's food has arrived and all the men back off from Shengnan as she zips up her hoodie all the way. Mr. Liu begins to mention her virginity and asks her about her horoscope to set her up with his son. She reveals she's had boyfriends before and has broken up with them due to them getting in the way of her academics as well as their poor sexual performance. Shocked, the businessmen look to the Taoist priest (Junjie Shi) sitting with them. The priest informs them informs them that as long as they have her luck and the horoscope matches they will be okay, and all the businessmen laugh it off. The priest ends the dinner by blessing them and wishing them good luck in their business.

The group proceeds to go to a mix of a brothel and club. As the women introduce themselves to the men and call them daddies, Shengnan notices her friend Lily is also among this group of sex workers. In the club, Shengnan sits with Jianguo Wang to feel more comfortable. The businessmen get excited and begin to howl and hoot like monkeys, while Jianguo Wang howls but more like a wolf.

Shengnan gets a red money packet from her cousin as she prepares to leave. As her cousin is leaving, she notices numerous male workers leaving Jianguo's room and describes him as picky. Shengnan sits with Jianguo and thanks him for being so nice and attempts to hand him a red money packet but he refuses it. Jianguo begins to tell her about his struggles in life, revealing he had hair transplant surgery, and while he does this Shengnan hands him a money packet. Suddenly Jianguo snaps. He is wearing wings and as he begins to do an expressive dance to the song "Disappointing" by John Grant ft. Tracey Thorn, Shengnan quickly joins in.

Jianguo offers to show Shengnan something fun, and he takes her to a parking garage. In the garage they see her cousin having sex in a car telling her partner to call her mama and grandma. The pair go up to the glass and flash a flashlight shouting "Police!", before running off. Jianguo runs off, exclaiming all heterosexuals must die. Shengnan returns to the same spot where she had soup with Lily in the beginning and Jianguo joins them. As they are all eating soup, Jianguo notices a man and it appears to be love at first sight. Shengnan gives Jianguo money and asks him to be safe. The two men take deep breaths, taking in each other's scent before going off. Shengnan times the men similar to how she timed the couple at the film's beginning.

== Production ==
All the Crows in the World was made by Tang Yi, a New York University film student from Fuzhou.

=== Funding ===
In her acceptance speech for the Palme d’Or for Best Short Film at the 2021 Cannes Film Festival, Tang Yi mentions the limited budget for this film. She thanked Fresh Wave and the Hong Kong Arts Development Council for providing the money that made filming possible without significant financial pressure.

All the Crows in the World was first showcased in Hong Kong on July 16, 2021, during the 15th Annual Fresh Wave International Short Film Festival local competition, which offers selected candidates a subsidy of one hundred thousand Hong Kong Dollars for the production of a short film.

== Release ==
The film was first released on June 13, 2021 in Hong Kong at the Fresh Wave International Film Festival. It was then released in France on July 16, 2021 at the Cannes Film Festival, in Switzerland on November 10, 2021 at the Winterthur International Short Film Festival, in the United States on July 25, 2022 at the New York Asian Film Festival, in Canada on August 12, 2022 at the Mulan International Film Festival, and in Ukraine on December 2, 2022 at the Molodist Kyiv International Film Festival.

=== Home release ===
The film is available to watch on the streaming services Amazon Prime Video, The Criterion Channel, and Kanopy. It is also available to rent and buy on the video sharing platform Vimeo.

== Cast ==
The short film stars Xuanyu Chen alongside Baohe Xue, Shujun Huang, Zhengyi Liu, and Ge Wu. Xuanyu Chen is a freelance actor who plays Shengnan Zhao in the short film, her character is the main protagonist of the film who is a high school girl who experiences the "surreal world of sexist men and their many toxic delights". Xuanyu Chen is also known for her roles in Quan jinshu liehen (2016), Xi huan gao xing ai (2023) and The Night Rain South Township (2023). The actor Baohe Xue who portrays Jianguo Wang is also known for his roles in Day Tripper (2023), The Hammer and Sickle Are Sleeping (2013) and A Sweet Life (2019).

== Awards ==
Enrolled in Hong Kong's 15th Fresh Wave International Short Film Festival, registered under the local competition section, director, screenwriter, and cinematographer Tang Yi's film All the Crows in the World merited the Best Screenplay and Best Director awards on June 27, 2021. On July 17th, 2021, at the 74th Cannes Film Festival in France, director Tang Yi received the annual Palme d'Or award for best short film.

On March 15, 2022, Tang was presented with the Grand Jury Award as her film was the distinguished winner in the Narrative Short Competition hosted by the 29th South by Southwest (SXSW) Film Festival in Texas. In December of that year, the 51st Kyiv International Film Festival "Molodist" competition deemed her film the "Best International Short Film".

In November 25, 2023, the 16th TorinoFilmLab event held in Turin, Italy, awarded Tang a grant as well as the EWA Network Female Voices Award, associated with the European Women's Audiovisual Network, which is given "to one female writer/director."

=== Awards ===
All the Crows in the World received a "nomination certificate" from the 58th Taipei Golden Horse Film Festival in Taiwan as the film was considered for the 2021 division for Best Live Action Short Film.

Year	Organization	Award	Result	Source
2021	15th Fresh Wave International Short Film Festival	Best Screenplay; Best Director	Won	
2021	74th Cannes Film Festival	Palme d'Or	Won	
2021	58th Taipei Golden Horse Film Festival	Best Live Action Short Film	Nominated	
2022	29th South by Southwest Film Festival	Jury Award in Narrative Shorts	Won	
2022	51st Molodist Kyiv International Film Festival	Best International Short Film	Won	
2023	16th Torino Film Lab Meeting Event	EWA Network Female Voices Award	Won	

== Critical response ==
In the audience rating section of IMDb, Tang's short film stands at 6.1 out of 10, averaging from 490 posted viewer reviews. On the site Douban, the film is rated out of 10 and listed at a 5.5; thus, a three-star average is based on 8,208 reviews.

The five judges, which included May Fung representing the 15th Fresh Wave local competition, shared that the film screenplay provided "a sharp sense of humor in challenging and satirizing the absurd society." They positively addressed that the short's directing "conveys much liveliness through acting, photography and art direction." SXSW 2022 Film Festival judging panel involved Mohammad Gorjestani, and two other individuals gave the film an esteemed review, expressing that it "reminded us of the power of short-form cinema as a stand-alone art form on its own."

The film has been described as a "a burning satire of contemporary Chinese culture, its paradoxes and hypocritical nature." and praised for being "(s)mart, bold and inventive in its blend of different tropes". In a more mixed review at The China Project, Catherine Zauhar praises the overall economy of the plot as follows: "The film succeeds where so many short films fail: at trusting the viewer to recognize the multitude of backstories that hide behind the central narrative."
