= 2021 New York Film Festival =

59th edition

- Opening film: The Tragedy of Macbeth
- Closing film: Parallel Mothers
- Location: New York City, United States
- Founded: 1963
- Founded by: Richard Roud and Amos Vogel
- Hosted by: Film at Lincoln Center
- Artistic director: Dennis Lim
- Festival date: September 24 – October 10, 2021
- Website: https://www.filmlinc.org/nyff2021/

New York Film Festival
- 2022 2020

The 59th New York Film Festival took place from September 24 to October 10, 2021. Unlike the 2020 New York Film Festival, which was staged online due to the COVID-19 pandemic, the 2021 festival returned to physical screenings at the Lincoln Center, however all screenings required masking.

Joel Coen's The Tragedy of Macbeth was the opening film. Jane Campion's The Power of the Dog was the festival's centerpiece screening. Pedro Almodóvar's Parallel Mothers was the closing film.

Appearing in the NYFF's "Main Slate" for the first time are Jonas Carpignano, Michelangelo Frammartino, Avi Mograbi, Jonas Poher Rasmussen, Francesco Munzi, Radu Muntean, Saul Williams and Anisia Uzeyman, Rebecca Hall, Tatiana Huezo, Julia Ducournau, Kira Kovalenko and Alexandre Koberidze.

World premieres included Joel Coen's The Tragedy of Macbeth and Avi Mograbi's The First 54 Years: An Abbreviated Manual for Military Occupation.

== Official Selection ==
=== Main Slate ===
| English title | Original title | Director(s) | Production country |
|---|---|---|---|
| A Chiara | | Jonas Carpignano | Italy |
| Ahed's Knee | הַבֶּרֶךְ | Nadav Lapid | France, Israel, Germany |
| Bad Luck Banging or Loony Porn | Babardeală cu bucluc sau porno balamuc | Radu Jude | Romania, Luxembourg, Czech Republic, Croatia |
| Benedetta | | Paul Verhoeven | France, Netherlands |
| Bergman Island | | Mia Hansen-Løve | France, Germany, Belgium, Sweden |
| Il buco | | Michelangelo Frammartino | Italy, France, Germany |
| Drive My Car | ドライブ・マイ・カー | Ryusuke Hamaguchi | Japan |
| The First 54 Years: An Abbreviated Manual for Military Occupation | | Avi Mograbi | France, Finland, Israel, Germany |
| Flee | | Jonas Poher Rasmussen | Denmark, France, Sweden, Norway |
| France | | Bruno Dumont | France, Germany, Belgium, Italy |
| Futura | | Pietro Marcello, Francesco Munzi and Alice Rohrwacher | Italy |
| The Girl and the Spider | Das Mädchen und die Spinne | Ramon Zürcher and Silvan Zürcher | Switzerland |
| Hit the Road | جاده خاکی | Panah Panahi | Iran |
| In Front of Your Face | 당신 얼굴 앞에서 | Hong Sang-soo | South Korea |
| Întregalde | | Radu Muntean | Romania |
| Introduction | 인트로덕션 | Hong Sang-soo | South Korea |
| Memoria | | Apichatpong Weerasethakul | Colombia, Thailand, United Kingdom, France, Germany, Mexico, Qatar |
| Neptune Frost | | Saul Williams and Anisia Uzeyman | United States, Rwanda |
| Parallel Mothers (closing film) | Madres Paralelas | Pedro Almodóvar | Spain |
| Passing | | Rebecca Hall | United States, United Kingdom |
| Petite Maman | | Céline Sciamma | France |
| The Power of the Dog (centerpiece) | | Jane Campion | New Zealand, United Kingdom, Canada, Australia |
| Prayers for the Stolen | Noche de fuego | Tatiana Huezo | Mexico, Germany, Brazil, Qatar |
| The Souvenir Part II | | Joanna Hogg | United Kingdom |
| Titane | | Julia Ducournau | France |
| The Tragedy of Macbeth (opening film) | | Joel Coen | United States |
| Unclenching the Fists | Разжимая кулаки | Kira Kovalenko | Russia |
| The Velvet Underground | | Todd Haynes | United States |
| Vortex | | Gaspar Noé | France |
| What Do We See When We Look at the Sky? | რას ვხედავთ როდესაც ცას ვუყურებთ? | Alexandre Koberidze | Georgia, Germany |
| Wheel of Fortune and Fantasy | 偶然と想像 | Ryusuke Hamaguchi | Japan |
| The Worst Person in the World | Verdens verste menneske | Joachim Trier | Norway |

=== Spotlight ===
| English title | Original title | Director(s) | Production country |
|---|---|---|---|
| Belle | 竜とそばかすの姫 | Mamoru Hosoda | Japan |
| C'mon C'mon | | Mike Mills | United States |
| Dune | | Denis Villeneuve | United States |
| The French Dispatch | | Wes Anderson | United States |
| Jane by Charlotte | Jane par Charlotte | Charlotte Gainsbourg | France |
| The Lost Daughter | | Maggie Gyllenhaal | United States, Greece |
| Marx Can Wait | Marx può aspettare | Marco Bellocchio | Italy |
| Red Rocket | | Sean Baker | United States |
| The Souvenir (2019) | | Joanna Hogg | United Kingdom, United States |

=== Currents ===
| English title | Original title | Director(s) | Production country |
|---|---|---|---|
| All About My Sisters | Jia ting lu xiang | Wang Qiong | United States |
| The Great Movement | El Gran Movimiento | Kiro Russo | Bolivia, France, Qatar, Switzerland |
| Haruhara-san's Recorder | Haruharasan no uta | Kyoshi Sugita | Japan |
| I Want to Talk About Duras | Vous ne désirez que moi | Claire Simon | France |
| Just a Movement | Juste une mouvement | Vincent Meessen | Belgium, France |
| Nature | La Nature | Artavazd Peleshyan | France, Germany, Armenia |
| A Night of Knowing Nothing | | Payal Kapadia | France, India |
| Outside Noise | | Ted Fendt | Germany, South Korea, Austria |
| Prism | | Éléonore Yameogo, An van Dienderen and Rosine Mbakam | Belgium |
| Returning to Reims | Retour à Reims (Fragments) | Jean-Gabriel Périot | France |
| A River Runs, Turns, Erases, Replaces | Gang-eun heuleugo, gub-ichigo, jiugo, doebichunda | Shengze Zhu | United States |
| Social Hygiene | Hygiène sociale | Denis Côté | Canada |
| Ste. Anne | | Rhayne Vermette | Canada |
| The Tale of King Crab | Re Granchio | Alessio Rigo de Righi and Matteo Zoppis | Italy, Argentina, France |
| The Tsugua Diaries | Diários de Otsoga | Maureen Fazendeiro and Miguel Gomes | Portugal |

=== Short films ===
| English title | Original title | Director(s) | Country |
|---|---|---|---|
| 38 | | Daniel Chew, Micaela Durand | United States |
| All of Your Stars Are But Dust on My Shoes | | Haig Aivazian | Lebanon |
| Blind Body | | Allison Chhorn | Australia |
| The Canyon | | Zachary Epcar | United States |
| The Capacity for Adequate Anger | | Vika Kirchenbauer | Germany |
| Cutting the Mushroom | | Mike Crane | United States |
| Day Is Done | | Zhang Dalei | China |
| Do Not Circulate | | Tiffany Sia | Hong Kong |
| Dog Star Descending | | Aykan Safoğlu | Turkey, Germany |
| Dreams Under Confinement | | Christopher Harris | United States |
| earthearthearth | | Daïchi Saïto | Canada |
| Elle | | Luise Donschen | Germany |
| Estuary | | Ross Meckfessel | United States |
| Fictions | | Manuela de Laborde | Mexico, Germany |
| Grandma's Scissors | | Erica Sheu | Taiwan, United States |
| Here Is the Imagination of the Black Radical | | Rhea Storr | United Kingdom |
| Homage to the Work of Philip Henry Gosse | | Pablo Martín Weber | Argentina |
| Home When You Return | | Carl Elsaesser | United States |
| A Human Certainty | | Morgan Quaintance | United Kingdom |
| If I Could Name You Myself (I Would Hold You Forever) | | Hope Strickland | United Kingdom |
| In and Out a Window | | Richard Tuohy | United States |
| In Flow of Words | | Eliane Esther Bots | Netherlands |
| Kindertotenlieder | | Virgil Vernier | France |
| May June July | | Kevin Jerome Everson | United States |
| Night Colonies | | Apichatpong Weerasethakul | Thailand |
| No Subject | | Guillermo Moncayo | France, Colombia |
| Personality Test | | Justin Jinsoo Kim | South Korea, United States |
| Reach Capacity | | Ericka Beckman | United States |
| Six Seventy-Two Variations, Variation 1 | | Tomonari Nishikawa | United States |
| South | | Morgan Quaintance | United Kingdom |
| Strange Object | | Miranda Pennell | United States |
| Sycorax | | Lois Patiño, Matías Piñeiro | Spain, Portugal |
| To Pick a Flower | | Shireen Seno | Philippines |
| Tonalli | | Los Ingrávidos | Mexico |
| What Is It That You Said? | | Shun Ikezoe | Japan |

=== Revivals ===
| English title | Original title | Director(s) | Production country |
|---|---|---|---|
| Adoption (1976) | Örökbefogadás | Márta Mészáros | Hungary |
| Assault on Precinct 13 (1976) | | John Carpenter | United States |
| Bluebeard's Castle (1963) | Herzog Blaubarts Burg | Michael Powell | Germany |
| Chameleon Street (1989) | | Wendell B. Harris, Jr. | United States |
| James Baldwin: From Another Place (1973) | | Sedat Pekay | Turkey |
| Hester Street (1975) | | Joan Micklin Silver | United States |
| Kummatty (1979) | | Govindan Aravindan | India |
| Mississippi Masala (1991) | | Mira Nair | United Kingdom, United States |
| Radio On (1979) | | Chris Petit | United Kingdom, West Germany |
| Ratcatcher (1999) | | Lynne Ramsay | United Kingdom, France |
| The Round-Up (1966) | | Miklós Jancsó | Hungary |
| Rude Boy (1980) | | Jack Hazan & David Mingay | United Kingdom |
| Sambizanga (1972) | | Sarah Maldoror | Angola, France |
| Songs for Drella (1990) | | Ed Lachman | United States |
| Sweet Sweetback's Baadasssss Song (1971) | | Melvin Van Peebles | United States |
| Who Killed Vincent Chin? (1987) | | Christine Choy | United States |

=== Amos Vogel Centenary Retrospective ===
| English title | Original title | Director(s) | Production country |
|---|---|---|---|
| The Lead Shoes (1949) | | Sidney Peterson | United States |
| Unconscious Motivation (1949) | | Lester F. Beck | United States |
| The Battle of San Pietro (1949) | | John Huston | United States |
| Study No. 11 (1932), Allegretto (1936-43), and Motion Painting No. 1 (1947) | | Oskar Fischinger | Germany |
| Barravento | | Glauber Rocha | Brazil |
| Pearls of the Deep (1965) | Perličky na dně | Jiří Menzel, Jan Němec, Evald Schorm, Věra Chytilová, and Jaromil Jireš | Czechoslovakia |
| The Flicker (1966) | | Tony Conrad | United States |
| Echoes of Silence (1965) | | Peter Emanuel Goldman | United States |
| Malcolm X: Struggle for Freedom (1964) | | Lebert Bethune | France |
| Now (1965) | | Santiago Álvarez | Cuba |
| Black Natchez | | David Neuman and Ed Pincus | United States |
| The Jungle (1966) | | 12th and Oxford Street Film Makers | United States |
| Film Club (1968) | | Jaime Barrios | United States |
| WR: Mysteries of the Organism (1971) | | Dušan Makavejev | Yugoslavia, West Germany |
| Nebula II (1971) | | Robert Frerck | United States |

== Free talks ==
| Section | Speakers | Notes | Ref. |
|---|---|---|---|
| The 2023 Amos Vogel Lecture | Albert Serra | The filmmaker spoke about his career and legacy | |
| Deep Focus | The Making of Mississippi Masala | A discussion between director Mira Nair, cinematographer Edward Lachman, and actress Sarita Choudhury. | |
| Deep Focus | Jane Campion | Campion talked about The Power of the Dog and her career with moderator and director Sofia Coppola. | |
| Deep Focus | Ryûsuke Hamaguchi | The auteur talked about his Drive My Car with moderator and filmmaker Matías Piñeiro. | |
| Deep Focus | Saul Williams & Anisia Uzeyman | The filmmakers talked about cinema as a means of realizing new and better futures with moderator Maya Cade. | |
| Deep Focus | Apichatpong Weerasethakul | The director talked about their latest film Memoria with novelist Katie Kitamura. | |
| Cross Cuts | Mia Hansen-Løve & Joachim Trier | The filmmakers talk about their latest films, Bergman Island and The Worst Person in the World respectively. | |
| Cross Cuts | Silvan Zürcher & Alexandre Koberidze | The two talked about their films The Girl and the Spider and What Do We See When We Look at the Sky?. | |
| Cross Cuts | Maggie Gyllenhaal & Kira Kovalenko | The female filmmakers discussed feminism, heroines, transcending the status quo. | |
