= 2021 Cannes Film Festival =

- Official poster of the 74th Cannes Film Festival featuring Jury President Spike Lee
- Opening film: Annette
- Closing film: OSS 117: From Africa with Love
- Location: Cannes, France
- Founded: 1946
- Awards: Palme d'Or: Titane
- Hosted by: Doria Tillier
- No. of films: 24 (In Competition)
- Festival date: 6–17 July 2021
- Website: festival-cannes.com/en

Cannes Film Festival
- 2022 2020

The 74th annual Cannes Film Festival took place from 6 to 17 July 2021, after having been originally scheduled from 11 to 22 May 2021. American filmmaker Spike Lee was invited to be the president of the jury for the main competition for the festival, after the COVID-19 pandemic in France scuttled plans to have him head the jury of the 2020 Cannes Film Festival. French actress Doria Tillier hosted the opening and closing ceremonies.

French filmmaker Julia Ducournau won the Palme d'Or for the horror-drama film Titane, becoming the second female director to ever win the award and the first to not win jointly with another filmmaker (at the 1993 edition Jane Campion had won jointly with Chen Kaige). The Honorary Palme d'Or was awarded to American actress and filmmaker Jodie Foster and Italian filmmaker Marco Bellocchio.

At the awards closing ceremony, on 17 July 2021, jury president Spike Lee made a gaffe by accidentally announcing the festival's top prize winner at the start of the night instead of the end.

The festival opened with Annette by Leos Carax, and closed with OSS 117: From Africa with Love by Nicolas Bedos.

== Juries ==
=== Main competition ===
- Spike Lee, American filmmaker – Jury President
- Mati Diop, French-Senegalese filmmaker and actress
- Mylène Farmer, French singer, songwriter and actress
- Maggie Gyllenhaal, American actress, filmmaker and producer
- Jessica Hausner, Austrian filmmaker
- Mélanie Laurent, French actress and director
- Kleber Mendonça Filho, Brazilian filmmaker, film programmer, and critic
- Tahar Rahim, French actor
- Song Kang-ho, South Korean actor

=== Un Certain Regard ===
- Andrea Arnold, British filmmaker – Jury President
- Daniel Burman, Argentine filmmaker
- Michael Angelo Covino, American filmmaker and actor
- Mounia Meddour, Algerian filmmaker
- Elsa Zylberstein, French actress

=== Caméra d'or ===
- Mélanie Thierry, French actress – Jury President
- Audrey Abiven, French director of Tri Track (post-synchronization company)
- Éric Caravaca, French actor and filmmaker
- Romain Cogitore, French filmmaker and photographer
- Laurent Dailland, French director of photography
- Pierre-Simon Gutman, French critic

=== Cinéfondation and short films ===
- Sameh Alaa, Egyptian filmmaker
- Kaouther Ben Hania, Tunisian filmmaker
- Carlos Muguiro, Spanish filmmaker
- Tuva Novotny, Swedish filmmaker and actress
- Nicolas Pariser, French filmmaker
- Alice Winocour, French filmmaker

=== Independent juries ===
Critics' Week

- Cristian Mungiu, Romanian filmmaker – Jury President
- Didar Domehri, French producer
- Camélia Jordana, French actress, composer and singer
- Michel Merkt, Swiss producer
- Karel Och, Czech artistic director of the Karlovy Vary International Film Festival

L'Œil d'or

- Ezra Edelman, American filmmaker – Jury President
- Julie Bertuccelli, French filmmaker
- Iris Brey, French journalist, author and critic
- Déborah François, Belgian actress
- Orwa Nyrabia, Syrian filmmaker, producer and artistic director of the International Documentary Film Festival Amsterdam

Queer Palm

- Nicolas Maury, French actor and filmmaker - Jury President
- Josza Anjembe, French filmmaker and journalist
- Roxane Mesquida, French actress
- Vahram Muratyan, French artist and graphic designer
- Aloïse Sauvage, French actress and singer

== Official Selection ==
=== In Competition ===
The following films were selected to compete for the Palme d'Or:

English Title	Original Title	Director(s)	Production Country
Ahed's Knee	הַבֶּרֶךְ	Nadav Lapid	Israel, France, Germany
Annette (opening film)		Leos Carax	France, Germany, Belgium, United States, Japan, Mexico, Switzerland
Benedetta (QP)		Paul Verhoeven	France, Netherlands, Belgium
Bergman Island		Mia Hansen-Løve	France, Brazil, Germany, Mexico
Casablanca Beats	علي صوتك	Nabil Ayouch	Morocco, France
Compartment No. 6 (QP)	Hytti nro 6	Juho Kuosmanen	Finland, Estonia, Russia, Germany
The Divide (QP)	La Fracture	Catherine Corsini	France
Drive My Car	ドライブ・マイ・カー	Ryusuke Hamaguchi	Japan
Everything Went Fine (QP)	Tout s'est bien passé	François Ozon	France
Flag Day		Sean Penn	United States
France		Bruno Dumont	France, Italy, Germany, Belgium
The French Dispatch		Wes Anderson	United States
A Hero	قهرمان	Asghar Farhadi	Iran, France
Lingui, The Sacred Bonds		Mahamat-Saleh Haroun	Chad, Belgium, France, Germany
Memoria		Apichatpong Weerasethakul	Thailand, Colombia, United Kingdom, France, Germany, Mexico, China, Taiwan, United States, Switzerland
Nitram		Justin Kurzel	Australia
Paris, 13th District (QP)	Les Olympiades	Jacques Audiard	France
Petrov's Flu	Петровы в гриппе	Kirill Serebrennikov	Russia, Germany, Switzerland, France, United States
Red Rocket		Sean Baker	United States
The Restless	Les Intranquilles	Joachim Lafosse	Belgium, France, Luxembourg
The Story of My Wife	A feleségem története	Ildikó Enyedi	Hungary, France, Germany, Italy
Three Floors	Tre piani	Nanni Moretti	Italy, France
Titane (QP)		Julia Ducournau	France, Belgium
The Worst Person in the World	Verdens verste menneske	Joachim Trier	Norway, France, Sweden, Denmark

(QP) indicates film in competition for the Queer Palm.

=== Un Certain Regard ===
The following films were selected to compete in the Un Certain Regard section:

English Title	Original Title	Director(s)	Production Country
After Yang		Kogonada	United States
Blue Bayou		Justin Chon	United States
La Civil (CdO)		Teodora Mihai	Belgium, Mexico, Romania
Commitment Hasan	Bağlılık Hasan	Semih Kaplanoğlu	Turkey
Freda (CdO)		Gessica Généus	Haiti
Good Mother	Bonne Mère	Hafsia Herzi	France
Great Freedom (QP)	Große Freiheit	Sebastian Meise	Austria, Germany
House Arrest	Дело	Aleksey German, Jr.	Russia
The Innocents	De uskyldige	Eskil Vogt	Denmark, Finland, Norway, Sweden, United States
Lamb (CdO)	Dýrið	Valdimar Jóhannsson	Iceland, Poland, Sweden
Let It Be Morning	ויהי בוקר	Eran Kolirin	Israel, France
Moneyboys (CdO, QP)		C.B. Yi	Taiwan, Austria, Belgium, France
My Brothers and I (CdO)	Mes frères et moi	Yohan Manca	France
Onoda: 10,000 Nights in the Jungle (opening film)	Onoda, 10 000 nuits dans la jungle	Arthur Harari	France, Japan, Germany, Belgium, Italy, Cambodia
Playground (CdO)	Un monde	Laura Wandel	Belgium
Prayers for the Stolen	Noche de fuego	Tatiana Huezo	Mexico
Rehana Maryam Noor	রেহানা মরিয়ম নূর	Abdullah Mohammad Saad	Bangladesh
Streetwise (CdO)	街娃儿	Jiazuo Na	China
Unclenching the Fists	Разжимая кулаки	Kira Kovalenko	Russia
Women Do Cry (QP)	Жените плачат	Vesela Kazakova, Mina Mileva	Bulgaria, France

(CdO) indicates film eligible for the Caméra d'Or as a feature directorial debut.
(QP) indicates film in competition for the Queer Palm.

=== Out of Competition ===
The following films were selected to be screened out of competition:

English Title	Original Title	Director(s)	Production Country
Aline, the Voice of Love	Aline	Valérie Lemercier	Canada, France
BAC Nord		Cédric Jimenez	France
Emergency Declaration	비상선언	Han Jae-rim	South Korea
OSS 117: From Africa with Love (closing film)	OSS 117: Alerte rouge en Afrique noire	Nicolas Bedos	France
Peaceful	De son vivant	Emmanuelle Bercot	France
Stillwater		Tom McCarthy	United States
The Velvet Underground		Todd Haynes	United States
Where Is Anne Frank		Ari Folman	Israel, Belgium, Luxembourg, Netherlands, France
Midnight Screenings
Bloody Oranges	Oranges sanguines	Jean-Christophe Meurisse	France
Suprêmes		Audrey Estrougo	France
Tralala		Arnaud and Jean-Marie Larrieu	France

=== Cannes Premiere ===
The following films were selected to be screened in the Cannes Premiere section:

English Title	Original Title	Director(s)	Production Country
Belle	竜とそばかすの姫	Mamoru Hosoda	Japan
Cow		Andrea Arnold	United Kingdom
Deception	Tromperie	Arnaud Desplechin	France
Evolution	Evolúció	Kornél Mundruczó	Hungary
Hold Me Tight	Serre-moi fort	Mathieu Amalric	France
In Front of Your Face	당신의 얼굴 앞에서	Hong Sang-soo	South Korea
Jane by Charlotte (CdO)	Jane par Charlotte	Charlotte Gainsbourg	France
JFK Revisited: Through the Looking Glass		Oliver Stone	United States
Love Songs for Tough Guys	Cette musique ne joue pour personne	Samuel Benchetrit	France
Marx Can Wait	Marx può aspettare	Marco Bellocchio	Italy
Mothering Sunday		Eva Husson	United Kingdom
Val		Ting Poo, Leo Scott	United States
Vortex		Gaspar Noé	Argentina, Italy

(CdO) indicates film eligible for the Caméra d'Or as a feature directorial debut.

=== Special Screenings ===
English Title	Original Title	Director(s)	Production Country
Are You Lonesome Tonight? (CdO)	热带往事	Wen Shipei	China
Black Notebooks		Shlomi Elkabetz	Israel
Babi Yar. Context	Бабий Яр. Контекст	Sergei Loznitsa	Netherlands, Ukraine
H6 (CdO)		Yé Yé	France
Les Héroïques (CdO)		Maxime Roy	France
Mariner of the Mountains	O Marinheiro das Montanhas	Karim Aïnouz	Brazil
Mi Iubita Mon Amour (CdO)		Noémie Merlant	France
New Worlds, The Cradle of a Civilization		Andrew Muscato	Greece, United States
Revolution of Our Times	時代革命	Kiwi Chow	Hong Kong
The Year of the Everlasting Storm		Jafar Panahi, Anthony Chen, Malik Vitthal, Laura Poitras, Dominga Sotomayor Castillo, David Lowery, Apichatpong Weerasethakul	Iran, Singapore, United States, Chile, Thailand

(CdO) indicates film eligible for the Caméra d'Or as a feature directorial debut.

=== Cinema for the Climate ===
Ephemeral section of films about environment:

English Title	Original Title	Director(s)	Production Country
Above Water	Marcher sur l'eau	Aïssa Maïga	Niger, France
Animal		Cyril Dion	France
Bigger Than Us		Flore Vasseur	France
The Crusade	La Croisade	Louis Garrel	France
I Am So Sorry		Zhao Liang	China, France
Invisible Demons		Rahul Jain	India
The Velvet Queen	La Panthère des neiges	Marie Amiguet, Vincent Munier	France

=== Short Films Competition ===
Out of 3,739 entries, the following films were selected to compete for the Short Film Palme d'Or.

English Title	Original Title	Director(s)	Production Country
North Pole	Severen Pol	Marija Apcevska	North Macedonia, Serbia
Displaced	Pa Vend	Samir Karahoda	Kosovo
In the Soil	Det er i jorden	Casper Kjeldsen	Denmark
Orthodontics	ارتودنسی	Mohammadreza Mayghani	Iran
The Right Words (QP)	Haut les coeurs	Adrian Moyse Dullin	France
Through the Haze	Noite turva	Diogo Salgado	Portugal
Sideral		Carlos Segundo	Brazil, France
All the Crows in the World		Tang Yi	Hong Kong
August Sky	Céu de Agosto	Jasmin Tenucci	Brazil, Iceland
Absence	Xue Yun	Wu Lang	China

(QP) indicates film in competition for the Queer Palm.

=== Cinéfondation ===
The Cinéfondation section focuses on films made by students at film schools. The following 17 entries (13 live-action and 4 animated films) were selected out of 1,835 submissions. Four of the films selected represent schools participating in Cinéfondation for the first time.

English Title	Original Title	Director(s)	School
Billy Boy (QP)		Sacha Amaral	Universidad Nacional de las Artes, Argentina
Love Stories on the Move	Prin oraș circulă scurte povești de dragoste	Carina-Gabriela Dașoveanu	UNATC I.L.Caragiale, Romania
The Salamander Child	L'enfant salamandre	Théo Degen	INSAS, Belgium
Beasts Among Us	Bestie wokół nas	Natalia Durszewicz	Łódź Film School, Poland
The Cat from the Deep Sea	Oyogeruneko	Huang Menglu	Musashino Art University, Japan
Other Half		Lina Kalcheva	NFTS, United Kingdom
Night Visit	הביקור	Mya Kaplan	Tel Aviv University, Israel
Bill and Joe Go Duck Hunting		Auden Lincoln-Vogel	University of Iowa, United States
Frida (QP)		Aleksandra Odić	DFFB, Germany
Red Shoes	Rudé boty	Anna Podskalská	FAMU, Czech Republic
The Fall of the Swift (QP)	La Caída del vencejo	Gonzalo Quincoces	ESCAC, Spain
Cantareira		Rodrigo Ribeyro	AIC, Brazil
Fonica M-120		Olivér Rudolf	SZFE, Hungary
Free Men	Frie Mænd	Óskar Kristinn Vignisson	Den Danske Filmskole, Denmark
King Max (QP)		Adèle Vincenti-Crasson	La Fémis, France
Saint Android		Lukas Von Berg	Film Academy Baden-Württemberg, Germany
Cicada (QP)		Yoon Daewoen	K-ARTS, South Korea

(QP) indicates film in competition for the Queer Palm.

=== Cannes Classics ===
The full line-up for the Cannes Classics section was announced on 22 June 2021.

English Title	Original Title	Director(s)	Production Country
Restorations
Black Orpheus (1959)	Orfeu Negro	Marcel Camus	France, Brazil, Italy
The Cassandra Cat (1963)	Až přijde kocour	Vojtěch Jasný	Czechoslovakia
Dancing in the Dust (1989)	Bal Poussière	Henri Duparc	Ivory Coast
Dear Louise (1972)	Chère Louise	Philippe de Broca	France, Italy
Demon Pond (1979)	夜叉ケ池	Masahiro Shinoda	Japan
Diary for My Children (1983)	Napló gyermekeimnek	Márta Mészáros	Hungary
The Double Life of Veronique (1991)	La Double vie de Véronique	Krzysztof Kieślowski	France, Poland, Norway
F for Fake (1973)		Orson Welles	France, Iran, West Germany
The Flowers of St. Francis (1950)	Francesco, giullare di Dio	Roberto Rossellini	Italy
The Fourteenth Day (1960)	Дан четрнаести	Zdravko Velimirović	Yugoslavia
Friendship's Death (1987)		Peter Wollen	United Kingdom
The Hussy (1978)	La Drôlesse	Jacques Doillon	France
I Know Where I'm Going! (1945)		Michael Powell and Emeric Pressburger	United Kingdom
The Killing Floor (1985)		Bill Duke	United States
Letter from an Unknown Woman (1948)		Max Ophüls	United States
Lumumba, Death of a Prophet (1990)	Lumumba, la mort d'un prophète	Raoul Peck	France, Germany, Switzerland, Belgium, Haiti
The Moon has Risen (1955)	月は上りぬ	Kinuyo Tanaka	Japan
Mulholland Drive (2001)		David Lynch	United States, France
Murder in Harlem (1935)		Oscar Micheaux	United States
Not Delivered (1957)	Échec au porteur	Gilles Grangier	France
The Path (1958)	El Camino	Ana Mariscal	Spain
Path of Hope (1950)	Il Cammino della speranza	Pietro Germi	Italy
Repentance (1987)	მონანიება	Tengiz Abuladze	Soviet Union
The War Is Over (1966)	La Guerre est finie	Alain Resnais	France
Documentaries about Cinema
All About Yves Montand	Montand est à nous	Yves Jeuland	France
Buñuel, un cineasta surrealista		Javier Espada	Spain
Flickering Ghosts of Love Gone By	Et j'aime à la fureur	André Bonzel	France
Oscar Micheaux – The Superhero of Black Filmmaking		Francesco Zippel	Italy
Satoshi Kon, l'illusioniste		Pascal-Alex Vincent	France, Japan
The Storms of Jeremy Thomas		Mark Cousins	United Kingdom
The Story of Film: A New Generation		Mark Cousins	United Kingdom

=== Cinéma de la plage ===
The following films have been selected to be screened out of competition, in the "Cinéma de la plage" section.

English Title	Original Title	Director(s)	Production Country
Amélie (2001)	Le Fabuleux destin d'Amélie Poulain	Jean-Pierre Jeunet	France
American Utopia (2020)		Spike Lee	
Black Cat, White Cat (1998)	Crna mačka, beli mačor	Emir Kusturica	FR Yugoslavia, France, Germany
F9		Justin Lin	United States
In the Mood for Love (2000)	花樣年華	Wong Kar-wai	Hong Kong
JFK (director's cut) (1991)		Oliver Stone	United States
Lovers Rock (2020)		Steve McQueen	United Kingdom, United States
Scarecrow (1973)		Jerry Schatzberg	United States
The Summit of the Gods	Le Sommet des Dieux	Patrick Imbert	France, Luxembourg
Tom Medina		Tony Gatlif	France

== Parallel sections ==
=== Critics' Week ===
The following films were selected to be screened in the Critics' Week.

English Title	Original Title	Director(s)	Production Country
In Competition
Amparo (CdO)		Simón Mesa Soto	Colombia, Sweden, Germany, Qatar
The Gravedigger's Wife (CdO)		Khadar Ayderus Ahmed	France, Somalia, Finland, Germany
Feathers (CdO)		Omar El Zohairy	France, Egypt, Netherlands, Greece
Libertad (CdO)		Clara Roquet	Spain, Belgium
Olga (CdO)		Elie Grappe	Switzerland, Ukraine, France
Small Body (CdO)	Piccolo Corpo	Laura Samani	Italy, France, Belgium
Zero Fucks Given (CdO)	Rien à foutre	Julie Lecoustre, Emmanuel Marre	France, Belgium
Short Films
Safe		Ian Barling	United States
Intercom 15	Interfon 15	Andrei Epure	Romania
On Solid Ground (QP)	Über Wasser	Jela Hasler	Switzerland
Lili Alone	Duo Li	Zou Jing	China, Hong Kong, Singapore
Inherent		Nicolai G.H. Johansen	Denmark
Soldat noir		Jimmy Laporal-Trésor	France
Noir-soleil		Marie Larrivé	France
Brutalia, Days of Labour (QP)		Manolis Mavris	Greece, Belgium
If It Ain't Broke	Ma Shelo Nishbar	Elinor Nechemya	Israel
An Invitation	Fang Ke	Hao Zhao, Yeung Tung	China
Special Screenings
Anaïs in Love (60th anniversary special screening) (CdO) (QP)	Les Amours d'Anaïs	Charline Bourgeois-Tacquet	France
A Tale of Love and Desire (closing film)	Une histoire d'amour et de désir	Leyla Bouzid	France
A Radiant Girl (CdO)	Une jeune fille qui va bien	Sandrine Kiberlain	France
Bruno Reidal, Confession of a Murderer (CdO) (QP)	Bruno Reidal	Vincent Le Port	France
Robust (opening film) (CdO)	Robuste	Constance Meyer	France
Softie (QP)	Petite Nature	Samuel Theis	France
Invitation Films from Morelia International Film Festival
Bisho		Pablo Giles	Mexico
A Face Covered with Kisses	Un rostro cubierto de besos	Mariano Renteria Garnica	Mexico
La Oscuridad		Jorge Sistos Moreno	Mexico
Pinky Promise		Indra Villaseñor Amador	Mexico

(CdO) indicates film eligible for the Caméra d'Or as a feature directorial debut.
(QP) indicates film in competition for the Queer Palm.

=== Directors' Fortnight ===
The following films were selected to be screened in the Directors' Fortnight section:

English Title	Original Title	Director(s)	Production Country
In Competition
A Chiara		Jonas Carpignano	Italy, United States
Ali & Ava		Clio Barnard	United Kingdom
A Night of Knowing Nothing (CdO)		Payal Kapadia	India
Between Two Worlds	Ouistreham	Emmanuel Carrère	France
A Brighter Tomorrow (CdO)	De bas étage	Yassine Qnia	France
The Braves	Entre les vagues	Anaïs Volpé	France
Clara Sola (CdO)		Nathalie Álvarez Mesén	Sweden, Costa Rica
The Employer and the Employee	El empleado y el patron	Manuel Nieto Zas	Uruguay
Europa		Haider Rashid	Italy
Futura		Pietro Marcello, Francesco Munzi, Alice Rohrwacher	Italy
Întregalde		Radu Muntean	Romania
The Hill Where Lionesses Roar (CdO) (QP)	Luaneshat e kodrës	Luàna Bajrami	France, Kosovo
Hit the Road (CdO)	جاده خاکی	Panah Panahi	Iran
Magnetic Beats (CdO)	Les Magnétiques	Vincent Maël Cardona	France
Medusa		Anita Rocha da Silveira	Brazil
Murina (CdO)		Antoneta Alamat Kusijanović	Croatia, United States, Brazil
Neptune Frost (QP)		Saul Williams, Anisia Uzeyman	Rwanda, United States
Our Men	Mon légionnaire	Rachel Lang	France, Belgium
Returning to Reims (Fragments) (QP)	Retour à Reims (Fragments)	Jean-Gabriel Périot	France
Ripples of Life	Yong an zhen gu shi ji	Shujun Wei	China
The Sea Ahead (CdO)	البحر أمامكم	Ely Dagher	Lebanon, Belgium, United States, Qatar
The Souvenir Part II		Joanna Hogg	United States, United Kingdom, Ireland
The Tale of King Crab	Re Granchio	Alessio Rigo de Righi, Matteo Zoppis	Italy, Argentina, France
The Tsugua Diaries	Diários de Otsoga	Miguel Gomes, Maureen Fazendeiro	Portugal
Special Screenings
Monrovia, Indiana		Frederick Wiseman	United States
The Souvenir		Joanna Hogg	United Kingdom, United States

(CdO) indicates film eligible for the Caméra d'Or as a feature directorial debut.
(QP) indicates film in competition for the Queer Palm.

==== Short and medium-length films ====
English Title	Original Title	Director(s)	Production Country
The Vandal		Eddie Alcazar	United States
When Night Meets Dawn	Când noaptea se întâlnește cu zorii	Andreea Cristina Borțun	Romania
Simone Is Gone (QP)	Simone est partie	Mathilde Chavanne	France
The Parents' Room		Diego Marcon	Italy
The Windshield Wiper		Alberto Mielgo	Spain
Anxious Body		Yoriko Mizushiri	Japan, France
Sycorax		Lois Patiño, Matías Piñeiro	Spain
The Sidereal Space	El Espacio sideral	Sebastián Schjaer	Argentina
Train Again		Peter Tscherkassky	Austria

(QP) indicates film in competition for the Queer Palm.

== Official awards ==
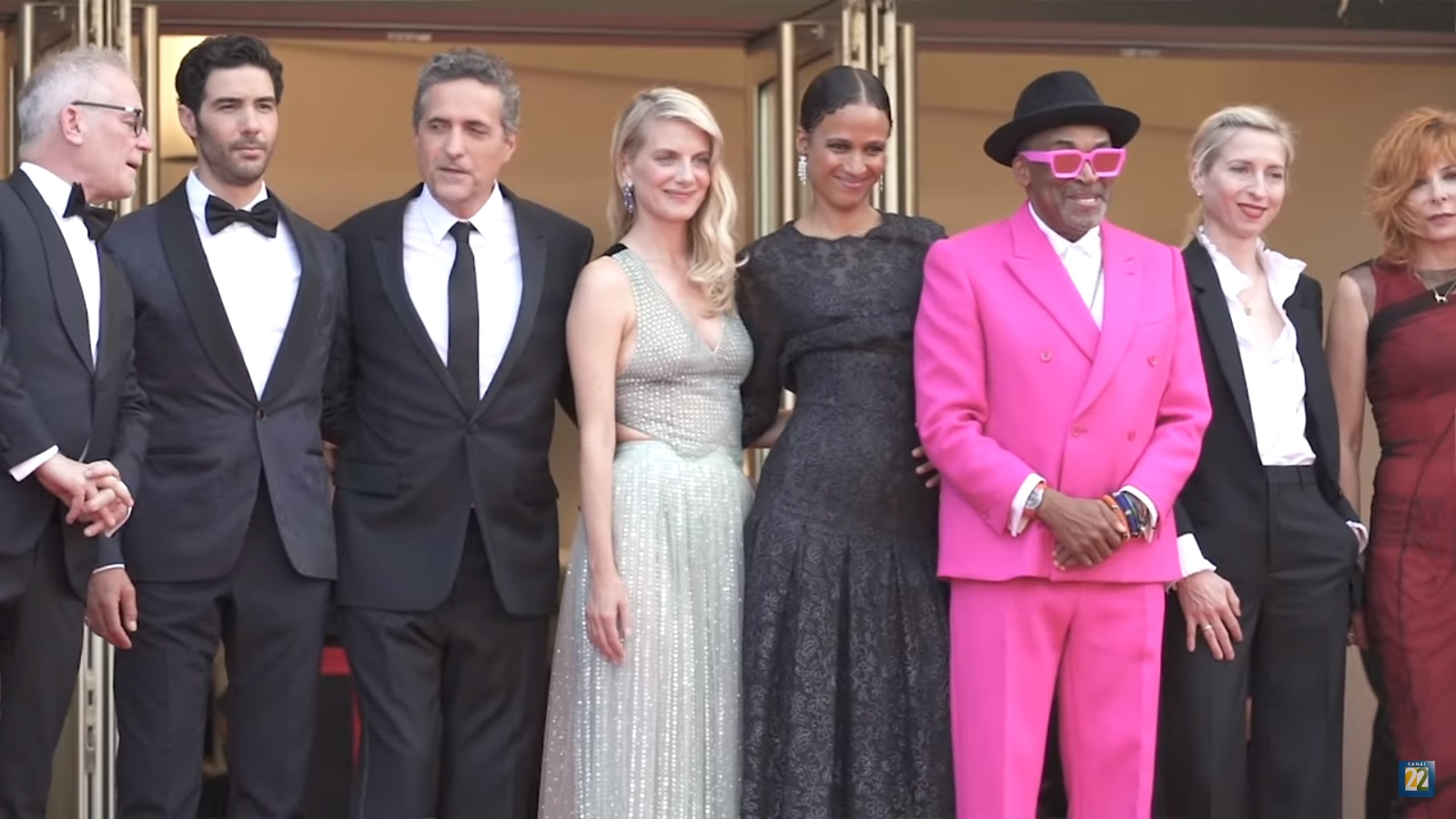
74th Cannes Film Festival Jury

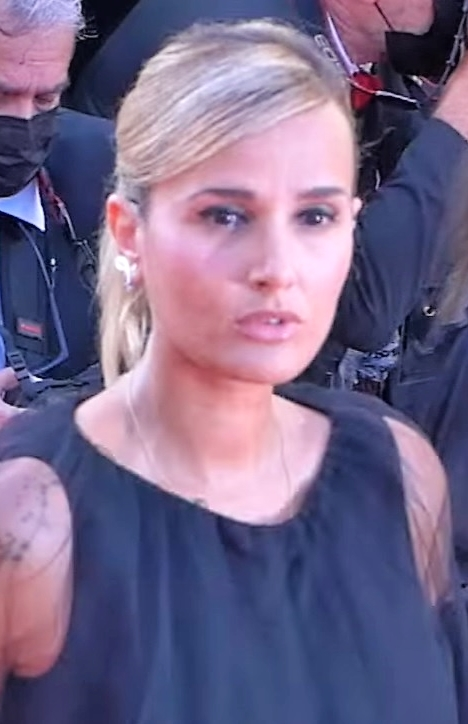
Julia Ducournau, Palme d'Or winner

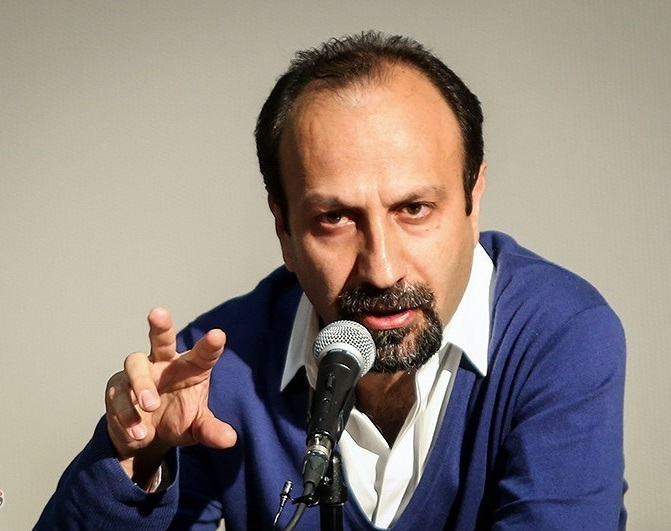
Asghar Farhadi, Grand Prix winner

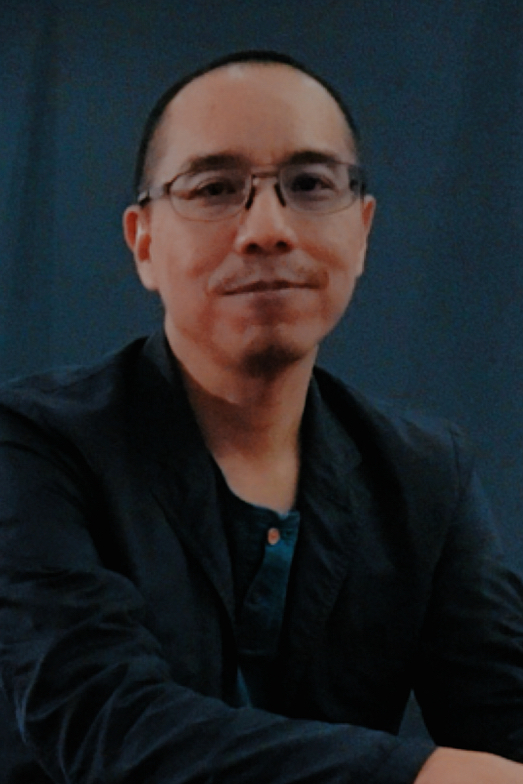
Apichatpong Weerasethakul, Jury Prize winner

=== In Competition ===
The following awards were presented for films shown In Competition:

- Palme d'Or: Titane by Julia Ducournau
- Grand Prix:
  - A Hero by Asghar Farhadi
  - Compartment No. 6 by Juho Kuosmanen
- Best Director: Leos Carax for Annette
- Best Actress: Renate Reinsve for The Worst Person in the World
- Best Actor: Caleb Landry Jones for Nitram
- Best Screenplay: Ryusuke Hamaguchi & Takamasa Oe for Drive My Car
- Jury Prize:
  - Ahed's Knee by Nadav Lapid
  - Memoria by Apichatpong Weerasethakul

=== Un Certain Regard ===
- Un Certain Regard Award: Unclenching the Fists by Kira Kovalenko
- Un Certain Regard Jury Prize: Great Freedom by Sebastian Meise
- Un Certain Regard Ensemble Prize: Good Mother by Hafsia Herzi
- Un Certain Regard Prize of Courage: La Civil by Teodora Mihai
- Un Certain Regard Prize of Originality: Lamb by Valdimar Jóhannsson
  - Special Mention: Prayers for the Stolen by Tatiana Huezo

=== Caméra d'Or ===
- Murina by Antoneta Alamat Kusijanović

=== Short Films Competition ===
- Short Film Palme d'Or: All the Crows in the World by Tang Yi
  - Special Mention: August Sky by Jasmin Tenucci

=== Cinéfondation ===
- First Prize: The Salamander Child by Théo Degen
- Second Prize: Cicada by Yoon Daewoen
- Third Prize:
  - Love Stories on the Move by Carina-Gabriela Daşoveanu
  - Cantareira by Rodrigo Ribeyro

=== Honorary Palme d'Or ===
- Jodie Foster and Marco Bellocchio

== Independent awards ==
=== FIPRESCI Prizes ===
- In Competition: Drive My Car by Ryusuke Hamaguchi
- Un Certain Regard: Playground by Laura Wandel
- Parallel section: Feathers by Omar El Zohairy (Critics' Week)

=== Prize of the Ecumenical Jury ===
- Drive My Car by Ryusuke Hamaguchi
  - Special Mention: Compartment No. 6 by Juho Kuosmanen

=== Critics' Week ===
- Nespresso Grand Prize: Feathers by Omar El Zohairy
- Leitz Cine Discovery Prize for Short Film: Lili Alone by Zou Jing
- Louis Roederer Foundation Rising Star Award: Sandra Melissa Torres for Amparo

=== Directors' Fortnight ===
- Europa Cinemas Label Award for Best European Film: A Chiara by Jonas Carpignano
- SACD Award for Best French-language Film: Magnetic Beats by Vincent Maël Cardona
- Carrosse d'Or: Frederick Wiseman

=== L'Œil d'or ===
- A Night of Knowing Nothing by Payal Kapadia

=== Queer Palm ===
- The Divide by Catherine Corsini

=== François Chalais Prize ===
- A Hero by Asghar Farhadi
  - Special Mention: Freda by Gessica Généus

=== Cannes Soundtrack Award ===
- Ron Mael & Russell Mael for Annette
- Rone for Paris, 13th District

=== Palm Dog ===
- Palm Dog Award: Rosie, Dora and Snowbear for The Souvenir Part II

=== Chopard Trophy ===
- Jessie Buckley
- Kingsley Ben-Adir

=== CNC Development Support for Best Project in La Résidence ===
- Saleh Kashefi for the project "Mammad"
- Inbar Horesh for the project "Birth Right"
