= Sideral (disambiguation) =

Sideral is a 2021 Brazilian and French short film.

Sideral may also refer to:

- Sideral (horse), an Argentine thoroughbred racehorse
- Sideral Linhas Aéreas, a Brazilian cargo and passenger charter airline
- Sunsundegui Sideral, a touring coach made by Sunsundegui

== See also ==
- Sidereal (disambiguation)
