= Anjembe =

Anjembe is a surname. Notable people with the surname include:

- Josza Anjembé (born 1982), French filmmaker
- Timothy Anjembe (born 1987), Nigerian footballer
