= Chicago International Children's Film Festival =

Film festival in Chicago, Illinois, US

In 1983, Facets Multi-Media founded the Chicago International Children's Film Festival (CICFF), the first competitive festival of films for children in the U.S. From its inception, the Festival has had independent juries of children and adult media professionals awarding prizes in multiple categories.

In 2023, the festival celebrated its 40th annual film festival.

After the festival's 40th anniversary edition in 2023, FACETS paused CICFF for 2024. As of 2026 the festival has not resumed.

== Awards ==
Chicago International Children's Film Festival award winners
Year	Film	Award
2023	A Greyhound of a Girl	Professional Jury — Best Animated Feature
2023	Boat People	Milos Stehlik Global Impact Award
2023	Coco Farm	Children's Jury — Best Live-Action Feature
2022	Dostojee	Milos Stehlik Global Impact Award
2022	Hush Hush Little Bear	Best Production for Young Children
2022	Ice Merchants	Youth Jury — Best Animated Short
2022	Laura's Star	Children's Jury — Best Live-Action Feature
2022	More Than I Want To Remember	Milos Stehlik Global Impact Award
2022	Rickshaw Girl	Best of the Fest
2021	Beans	Children's Jury — Best Live-Action Feature
2021	Buladó	Professional Jury — Best Live-Action Feature
2021	City of Lost Things	Professional Jury — Best Animated Feature
2021	Freebird	Professional Jury — Best Animated Short
2021	The Right Words	Programmer's Choice Award
2021	Two Buddies and a Badger – The Great Big Beast	Children's Jury — Best Animated Feature
2021	Vanille	Best of the Fest
2021	Wandering, A Rohingya Story	Milos Stehlik Global Impact Award
2021	Zog and the flying doctors	Children's Jury — Best Animated Short
2020	Dreambuilders	Professional Jury — Best Animated Feature
2020	Kapaemahu	Children's Jury — Best Animated Short
2020	Make It Soul	Programmer's Choice Award
2020	Ringside	Professional Jury — Best Documentary Feature
2020	Ringside	Youth Jury — Best Documentary Feature
2020	Shooom's Odyssey	Best of the Fest
2020	Sky Raiders	Children's Jury — Best Live-Action Feature
2020	The Elfkins – Baking a Difference	Children's Jury — Best Animated Feature
2019	Hacker	Children's Jury — Best Live-Action Feature
2019	My Extraordinary Summer with Tess	Professional Jury — Best Live-Action Feature
2019	Something About Alex	Youth Jury — Best Live-Action Short
2019	Tadpole	Programmer's Choice Award
2019	The Confirmation	Children's Jury — Best Live-Action Short
2019	Uncle Thomas, Accounting for the Days	Professional Jury — Best Animated Short
2018	Falcons	Children's Jury — Best Live-Action Feature
2018	Guaxuma	Youth Jury — Best Animated Short
2018	Late Afternoon	Children's Jury — Best Animated Short
2018	One Small Step	Professional Jury — Best Animated Short
2018	Sing Song	Professional Jury — Best Live-Action Feature
2018	The Tower	Liv Ullmann Peace Prize
2018	Tito e os pássaros	Professional Jury — Best Animated Feature
2018	Tito e os pássaros	Children's Jury — Best Animated Feature
2017	Birdboy: The Forgotten Children	Professional Jury — Best Animated Feature
2017	Birdboy: The Forgotten Children	Youth Jury — Best Animated Feature
2017	Dreaming of Denmark	Professional Jury — Best Documentary Feature
2017	Into the Blue	Professional Jury — Best Live-Action Short
2017	On Wheels	Professional Jury — Best Live-Action Feature
2017	The Oddsockeaters	Children's Jury — Best Animated Feature
2017	Timm Thaler	Children's Jury — Best Live-Action Feature
2016	Abulele	Professional Jury — Best Live-Action Feature
2016	Long Way North	Children's Jury — Best Animated Feature
2016	Phantom Boy	Professional Jury — Best Animated Feature
2016	Sing	Professional Jury — Best Live-Action Short
2015	Adama	Professional Jury — Best Animated Feature
2015	Adama	Best of the Fest
2015	Adama	Liv Ullmann Peace Prize
2015	Kacey Mottet Klein, Naissance d'un acteur	Youth Jury — Best Live-Action Short
2015	Kumu Hina (A Place in the Middle)	Children's Jury — Best Documentary Short
2015	Labyrinthus	Children's Jury — Best Live-Action Feature
2015	Les oiseaux de passage	Professional Jury — Best Live-Action Feature
2015	The Boy and the World	Programmer's Choice Award
2015	When Marnie Was There	Children's Jury — Best Animated Feature
2014	Bath House	Programmer's Choice Award
2014	Giovanni's Island	Professional Jury — Best Animated Feature
2014	Giovanni's Island	Children's Jury — Best Animated Feature
2014	Jill and Joy	Children's Jury — Best Live-Action Feature
2014	La Petite Casserole d'Anatole	Best of the Fest
2014	Les rayures du zèbre	Best Production for Young Children
2014	Secrets of War	Professional Jury — Best Live-Action Feature
2014	Strings	Professional Jury — Best Animated Short
2014	The Dam Keeper	Youth Jury — Best Animated Short
2013	Dragon Girls	Children's Jury — Best Documentary Feature
2013	Eskil & Trinidad	Programmer's Choice Award
2013	Mees Kees op kamp	Best of the Fest
2013	Ritter Rost - Eisenhart und voll verbeult	Children's Jury — Best Animated Feature
2013	To Guard a Mountain	Professional Jury — Best Live-Action Short
2012	Famous Five	Children's Jury — Best Live-Action Feature
2012	Kali the Little Vampire	Professional Jury — Best Animated Short
2012	The Painting	Professional Jury — Best Animated Feature
2012	Ways to Live Forever	Professional Jury — Best Live-Action Feature
2012	Zarafa	Children's Jury — Best Animated Feature
2012	Zarafa	Best of the Fest
2011	A Cat in Paris	Children's Jury — Best Animated Feature
2011	Het geheim	Children's Jury — Best Live-Action Feature
2011	The Fantastic Flying Books of Mr. Morris Lessmore	Professional Jury — Best Animated Short
2011	The Great Bear	Professional Jury — Best Animated Feature
2011	Tutu Much	Professional Jury — Best Documentary Feature
2011	Winter's Daughter	Professional Jury — Best Live-Action Feature
2010	Hier kommt Lola!	Children's Jury — Best Live-Action Feature
2010	ORPS – The Movie	Professional Jury — Best Live-Action Feature
2010	Pudana Last of the Line	Liv Ullmann Peace Prize
2010	The Gruffalo	Best of the Fest
2010	The Lost Thing	Professional Jury — Best Animated Short
2009	A Shine of Rainbows	Children's Jury — Best Live-Action Feature
2009	From Time to Time	Best of the Fest
2009	Lost and Found	Children's Jury — Best Animated Short
2009	Sinna Mann	Professional Jury — Best Animated Short
2009	Sores & Sîrîn	Professional Jury — Best Live-Action Short
2009	The Letter for the King	Children's Jury — Best Live-Action Feature
2009	Through a Glass, Darkly	Professional Jury — Best Live-Action Feature
2008	Mozart in China	Professional Jury — Best Live-Action Feature
2008	Quest for a Heart	Children's Jury — Best Animated Feature
2008	Stella and the star of the Orient	Best of the Fest
2008	The Ten Lives of Titanic the Cat	Children's Jury — Best Live-Action Feature
2008	We Who Stayed Behind	Children's Jury — Best Live-Action Short
2007	Crusade in Jeans	Children's Jury — Best Live-Action Feature
2007	Elias and the Royal Yacht	Professional Jury — Best Animated Feature
2007	Hoppet	Professional Jury — Best Live-Action Feature
2006	Among the Thorns	Professional Jury — Best Animated Short
2006	Drømmen	Children's Jury — Best Live-Action Feature
2006	Gruesome School Trip	Best of the Fest
2006	Kirikou and the Wild Beasts	Professional Jury — Best Animated Feature
2006	Kirikou and the Wild Beasts	Children's Jury — Best Animated Feature
2006	Zozo	Professional Jury — Best Live-Action Feature
2005	Bibi Blocksberg and the Secret of the Blue Owls	Children's Jury — Best Live-Action Feature
2005	Laura's Star	Professional Jury — Best Animated Feature
2005	The Golden Blaze	Children's Jury — Best Animated Feature
2005	Through My Thick Glasses	Professional Jury — Best Animated Short
2004	Birthday Boy	Professional Jury — Best Animated Short
2004	Blizzard	Best of the Fest
2004	Kate - la bisbetica domata	Children's Jury — Best Animated Feature
2004	Q12344241	Liv Ullmann Peace Prize
2004	Raining Cats and Frogs	Professional Jury — Best Animated Feature
2004	Tainá 2: A New Amazon Adventure	Children's Jury — Best Live-Action Feature
2003	I Want a Dog	Professional Jury — Best Animated Short
2003	The Boy Who Wanted To Be A Bear	Professional Jury — Best Animated Feature
2003	The Boy Who Wanted To Be A Bear	Children's Jury — Best Animated Feature
2003	Whale Rider	Children's Jury — Best Live-Action Feature
2002	Miss Minoes	Children's Jury — Best Live-Action Feature
2002	The Living Forest	Children's Jury — Best Animated Feature
2001	Bully Dance	Professional Jury — Best Animated Short
2000	Help! I'm a Fish	Children's Jury — Best Animated Short
2000	Saroja	Liv Ullmann Peace Prize
2000	Spooky House	Best of the Fest
2000	Tommy and the Wildcat	Best of the Fest
1999	At the Ends of the Earth	Children's Jury — Best Animated Short
1999	Kirikou and the Sorceress	Children's Jury — Best Animated Short
1998	The Wind in the Willows	Best of the Fest
1989	Friend or Foe	Liv Ullmann Peace Prize
1988	The Children of Noisy Village	Liv Ullmann Peace Prize
1988	The Man Who Planted Trees	Liv Ullmann Peace Prize
1987	Rainbow War	Liv Ullmann Peace Prize
