= Judith Chemla =

French actress (born 1985)

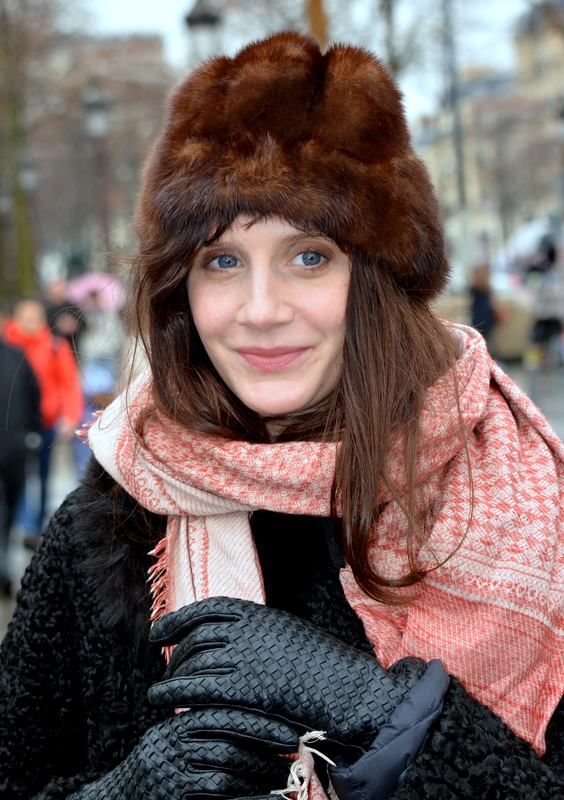
- Chemla in 2017
- Born: 5 July 1984 (age 42); Gentilly, France
- Occupation: Actress
- Years active: 2007–present

Judith Chemla (French: [ʒydit ʃɛmla]; born 5 July 1984) is a French actress.

== Life and career ==
In 2012, Chemla appeared in Camille Rewinds, for which she was nominated for Best Supporting Actress at the 38th César Awards.

On 10 April 2020, during the coronavirus lockdown, Chemla was one of a handful of people to take part in a Good Friday service led by Michel Aupetit, Archbishop of Paris, in the Cathedral of Notre-Dame de Paris, still being rebuilt after being damaged by fire a year earlier. All wore protective clothing. Chemla read, and gave an a capella rendition of Ave Maria.

Clemia had two children who were born 2010 - One with James Thierrée and another in 2017 with her former husband Yohan Manca. in 2022 Manca was arrested for domestic violence towards Chemla She recounts, among other things, this relationship in her book Notre silence nous a laissées seules ("Our Silence Left Us Alone"), published in January 2024.

== Filmography ==
Year	Title	Role	Director	Notes
2007	Hellphone	Margot	James Huth	
2007	Let's Dance	The student	Noémie Lvovsky	
2008	A Day at the Museum	Rosine Bagnole	Jean-Michel Ribes	
2008	Versailles	Nina	Pierre Schoeller	
2008	Le petit chaperon rouge	Delphine	Shinji Aoyama	Short
2009	La fenêtre	The woman	Anne-Sophie Rouvillois	Short
2009	Suite noire	Mathilde	Claire Devers	TV series (1 episode)
2010	The Princess of Montpensier	Catherine de Guise	Bertrand Tavernier	
2010	De vrais mensonges	Paulette	Pierre Salvadori	
2010	Je suis un no man's land	Chloé	Thierry Jousse	
2010	Sur la tête de Bertha Boxcar	The girl	Soufiane Adel & Angela Terrail	Short
2011	Les pseudonymes	Isabelle	Nicolas Engel	Short
2012	Camille Rewinds	Josepha	Noémie Lvovsky (2)	Lumière Award for Most Promising Actress; Nominated – César Award for Best Supporting Actress
2012	Fuir	Marie Dénilier	Virginia Bach	Short
2012	Miroir mon amour	Snow White	Siegrid Alnoy	TV movie
2012	Spiral	Sophie Mazerat	Jean-Marc Brondolo, Manuel Boursinhac	TV series (12 episodes)
2013	15 jours ailleurs	Hélène	Didier Bivel	TV movie Luchon International Film Festival – Best Young Actress
2013	Le Boeuf clandestin	Roberte	Gérard Jourd'hui	TV movie
2014	In the Name of My Daughter	Françoise	André Téchiné	
2014	Atlit	Asia	Shirel Amitay	
2014	Tout est permis	Claire	Émilie Deleuze	TV movie
2015	This Summer Feeling	Zoé	Mikhaël Hers	
2016	A Woman's Life	Jeanne Le Perthuis des Vauds	Stéphane Brizé	Nominated – César Award for Best Actress; Nominated – Lumière Award for Best Actress
2016	L'âge de raison	Sophie	Mathilde Petit	Short
2016	Maman	Elsa	Victoria Musiedlak	Short
2016	Guillaume à la dérive		Sylvain Dieuaide	Short
2017	C'est la vie !	Héléna	Éric Toledano and Olivier Nakache	
2017	Drôle de père	Camille	Amélie van Elmbt	
2018	Maya			
2019	Vif-argent	Agathe	Stéphane Batut	
2021	My Brothers and I			
2021	The Accusation	Lawyer	Yvan Attal	
2022	The Sixth Child	Meriem	Léopold Legrand	Nominated – César Award for Best Supporting Actress
2023	Of Money and Blood		Xavier Giannoli & Frederic Planchon	TV series
2024	Niki	Eva Aeppli	Celine Sallette	
2024	A Missing Part	Jessica	Guillaume Senez	
2025	Les rêveurs			

== Theater ==
Year	Title	Author	Director
2008	L'Illusion Comique	Pierre Corneille	Galin Stoev
2008	The Misanthrope	Molière	Lukas Hemleb
2008	Douce vengeance et autres sketches	Hanoch Levin	Galin Stoev (2)
2009	Figaro lässt sich scheiden	Ödön von Horváth	Jacques Lassalle
2009	Sik-sik, l'artefice magico	Eduardo De Filippo	Dan Jemmett
2010	Tue-Tête	Judith Chemla	Judith Chemla
2010–11	The Sweet Hereafter	Russell Banks	Emmanuel Meirieu
2011	Le Babil des classes dangereuses	Valère Novarina	Denis Podalydès
2011–12	L’Entêtement	Rafael Spregelburd	Marcial Di Fonzo Bo & Élise Vigier
2013	Le crocodile trompeur/Didon et Enée	Samuel Achache & Jeanne Candel	Samuel Achache & Jeanne Candel
2014	The Annunciation of Marie	Paul Claudel	Yves Beaunesne
2016	Traviata, vous méritez un avenir meilleur	Benjamin Lazar	Benjamin Lazar
