= Seneca – On the Creation of Earthquakes =

2023 film by Robert Schwentke

- Official poster
- Directed by: Robert Schwentke
- Screenplay by: Robert Schwentke; Matthew Wilder
- Produced by: Karim Debbagh; Frieder Schlaich; Irene von Alberti
- Starring: John Malkovich; Louis Hofmann; Geraldine Chaplin; Tom Xander; Julian Sands; Andrew Koji; Lilith Stangenberg; Mary-Louise Parker
- Cinematography: Benoît Debie
- Edited by: Michał Czarnecki
- Music by: Martin Todsharow
- Production companies: Filmgalerie 451; Dropkick Pictures; Gretchenfilm GmbH; Kasbah-Film Tanger; Kazak Productions; Zweites Deutsches Fernsehen; Arte
- Distributed by: Weltkino Film distribution GmbH; Picture Tree
- Release dates: 20 February 2023 (Berlinale); 23 March 2023 (Germany)
- Running time: 112 minutes
- Countries: Germany; Morocco
- Language: English

Seneca – On the Creation of Earthquakes (German: Seneca – Oder: Über die Geburt von Erdbeben) is a 2023 German-Moroccan historical drama dark comedy film directed by Robert Schwentke, starring John Malkovich as Seneca. The film is about the last days of the ancient philosopher Lucius Annaeus Seneca and the beginnings of Emperor Nero's despotic regime in Ancient Rome.

The film marks one of Julian Sands' final roles, being released following his disappearance in the San Gabriel Mountains in January 2023 and prior to the discovery of his body. The movie was selected at the 73rd Berlin International Film Festival in Berlinale Special Gala, where it had its world premiere on 20 February 2023. It was released in cinemas on 23 March 2023.

== Plot ==
Emperor Claudius banishes Seneca to Corsica and then marries young Agrippina. Later, she requests to Claudius that Seneca becomes tutor to their 12-year-old son Nero. Seneca returns and stands by Nero for several years, exerting a great influence on him, even after he becomes emperor. In 65 AD, Nero struggles to defend his tyrannical claim to sovereignty. Seneca, accused of being part of a conspiracy against Nero, is ordered to kill himself.

== Cast ==
- John Malkovich as Seneca
- Tom Xander as Nero
- Wolfram Koch as Fabius
- Louis Hofmann as Lucilius
- Lilith Stangenberg as Pompeia Paulina
- Samia Chancrin as Balbina
- Waldemar Kobus as Sergeant
- Annika Meier as Cecilia
- Lauren Wagner as Tigellinus
- Alexander Fehling as Decimus
- Geraldine Chaplin as Cecilia
- Blerim Destani as Piso
- Samuel Finzi as Status
- Andrew Koji as Felix
- Mary-Louise Parker as Agrippina
- Julian Sands as Rufus
- Guido Broscheit as Lucius

== Production ==
Filming began on 25 September 2021 in the southern Moroccan city of Ouarzazate. On 29 October 2021, the schedule was completed.

== Release ==
Seneca – On the Creation of Earthquakes had its premiere on 20 February 2023 as part of the 73rd Berlin International Film Festival, in Berlinale Gala Special. It was screened at the 54th International Film Festival of India in 'Cinema of the World' section on 25 November 2023.

It was released in cinemas on 23 March 2023.

It was reported in December 2022 that Picture Tree Intl, a Berlin-based sales company has taken up the sale of the film.

== Reception ==
On the review aggregator Rotten Tomatoes website, the film has an approval rating of 29% based on 7 reviews, with an average rating of 1.7/10.

Wendy Ide for ScreenDaily wrote in review that "It’s a film that features a lot of empty posturing, extravagant wigs, distracting set design full of stuff that is inexplicably on fire in the background, and numerous over-masticated performances." Stephen Farber of The Hollywood Reporter calling the film "lame historical lampoon" wrote, "The problem is with the underlying conception. Schwentke’s attempt to create a parable of the decline of the American empire seems mainly forced and fatuous."

== Accolades ==
| Award | Date | Category | Recipient | Result | Ref. |
|---|---|---|---|---|---|
| German Film Award | 12 May 2023 | 73rd German Film Awards Pre-selection | Seneca – On the Creation of Earthquakes | Nominated | |
