= Wild (2016 film) =

2016 film

- Directed by: Nicolette Krebitz
- Written by: Nicolette Krebitz
- Starring: Lilith Stangenberg
- Release dates: 24 January 2016 (Sundance); 14 April 2016 (Germany)
- Running time: 97 minutes
- Country: Germany
- Language: German

Wild is a 2016 German drama film directed by Nicolette Krebitz. It was shown in the World Cinema Dramatic Competition section at the 2016 Sundance Film Festival.

== Plot ==
The protagonist, a young woman named Ania, lives in seclusion in a prefabricated housing estate in Halle-Neustadt. At her job as an IT specialist in an advertising agency, she is harassed by her tyrannical boss Boris, who at the same time is attracted to her. One day, on her way home from work, Ania meets a wolf in a park. The encounter with the wild animal triggers a strong attraction to Ania. Her thoughts are increasingly circling around the wolf, which she is trying to approach by crying about him at night, buying meat or even living rabbits for food. She decides to bring the wolf to her; In fact, she manages to numb the animal and bring it to her apartment. While she neglects her interpersonal contacts - to colleagues but also to her sister - Ania starts to live out her instincts. She looks increasingly neglected to the outside, but also self-confident and sexually free. This reflects the gradually more intense and more familiar relationship with the wolf, with whom she actually lives together now. She starts a kind of love affair with the animal. Finally, there is the final break with Boris and her work in the agency; At last, Ania even breaks completely into the wilderness with the wolf.

== Cast ==
- Lilith Stangenberg
- Georg Friedrich
- Silke Bodenbender

== Production ==
Lilith Stangenberg recalled she was totally euphoric after the love scene with the wolf. She said, "suddenly he came and licked my whole head and neck and stuff and the whole scene happened exactly like in the script. And I have to say: I've never experienced such devotion, such a loss of control. That inspired me so much that I could only cheer afterwards."
