= Streetwise (2021 film) =

2021 Chinese crime-drama film

- Chinese: 街娃儿
- Hanyu Pinyin: Jiē wá ér
- Directed by: Jiazuo Na
- Written by: Jiazuo Na
- Produced by: Guan Hu; Justine O.
- Starring: Miyi Huang; Lu Yao; Jiuxiao Li; Yu Ailei; Baoliang Sha
- Cinematography: Jia Neng Li
- Edited by: Jinlei Kong
- Production company: The Seventh Art Pictures
- Distributed by: Dekanalog
- Release date: 16 June 2021
- Running time: 96 minutes
- Country: China
- Language: Mandarin

Streetwise (Chinese: 街娃儿, Pinyin: jiē wá ér) is a 2021 Chinese crime drama film directed by Jiazuo Na. The film follows a lowly debt collector working to take care of his ailing father.

== Plot ==
The film opens in 2010, Fengjie, Chongqing. From the front of a boat, a young man (Dong Zi) scatters someone's ashes from an urn into the Yangtze river.

Flash back to 2004, Sichuan. Dong Zi and his mentor Xi Jun are working as debt collectors. Dong Zi has been working with Jun for the last six months. His father is ill and his mother is dead. Dong Zi's father is a gambling addict with a bad temper, who has been in and out of hospital. Dong Zi is working to make money to pay for his father's medical bills. Dong Zi has a crush on tattoo artist Jiu'er. Her ex-husband, Mr. Four (who is also Jun's boss), asks to remarry her but she refuses. Jun tells Dong Zi to not mess around with her because of her ex. The boss discovers that Jun has been skimming money from his business and has him beaten up. Jun breaks up with his girlfriend since he can no longer give her monetary support and starts working at a karaoke bar. Four visits the bar and humiliates Jun.

Dong Zi and Jiu'er visit his father in the hospital, and his father causes a scene insisting that Dong Zi not sleep with Jiu'er. Jiu'er collects her things from Four's home and tells him she's moving to Hunan. Dong Zi is called to the police station when his father is caught running a pseudo-brothel out of his apartment, enabling an affair. Dong Zi takes his mother's urn away from his father and they fight. Dong Zi kowtows before his father and proclaims: "In my next life, I'll come back as your dad." Dong Zi brings the urn to the tattoo parlor and finds that Jiu'er has packed up the shop. She gives Dong Zi a tattoo and tells him she is going to sublet the shop. Dong Zi says he wants to go with her but can't because he has to take care of his dad.

Dong Zi sees Jiu'er off. His credit at the hospital runs out so he fantasizes a violent and unpredictable return to debt collecting. In the daydream, he kidnaps the daughter of a delinquent debtor and threatens to ignite the bundle of firecrackers being used to strap the girl to himself. Instead, he sells his motorbike and uses the money to pay down the hospital debt. Four orders his thugs to take care of Dong Zi or his father. The thugs walk in on Dong Zi's father as he's about to commit suicide by hanging and they try to convince him not to do it. The thugs leave and Dong Zi's father writes a suicide note, but before killing himself he trashes the room and has a heart attack. He's brought back to the hospital in critical condition. Jun's ex-girlfriend's clothing store is trashed by Four's thugs and she leaves to Guangzhou. Jun hires thugs to attack Four and get the combination to his safe.

Jiu'er returns and sees Dong Zi's father in the hospital. After sharing that she likes Dong Zi because he looks at her without any other intentions, and that they've never slept together, Dong Zi's father dies. Jiu'er tries to call Dong Zi's phone but he doesn't answer. As she's searching for him, someone passes by on his old motorbike. She runs after the motorbike, believing it to be Dong Zi, and is hit by Jun's car. Jun puts her in his car and runs away. Four escapes his captors. Dong Zi sees Jiu'er being taken in an ambulance and runs after her. Four cries at the hospital while holding Jiu'er's bundle of personal effects. Along the Yangtze river, Dong Zi finds Jun and tells him to leave and never come back. Jun apologizes, saying it wasn't intentional. Dong Zi enters a trance state as he reflects on the loss of his parents and Jiu'er, as the words his dad used to say play in his mind.

== Cast ==
- Li Jiuxiao as Dong Zi
- Huang Miyi as Jiu'er
- Yu Ailei as Xi Jun
- Yao Lu as Dong Zi's Father
- Sha Baoliang as Mr Four
- Tao Yang as Policeman
- Dai Xiaoying as Yang Liu
- Luo Siwei as Xiao Yun
- Liu Yunlong as KTV Youth
- Xiu Chao as Xiao Yun's Boyfriend
- Chen Nuo as Zhang Yongxi
- Sun Peng as Officer
- Zhang Yuxuan as Officer's Son
- Liu Chao as Security
- Gu Yuyang as Customer
- Yang Dawei as Patient
- Ren Jie as Xiaoyun's Mother
- Su Yuanda as Singing Man
- Tang Qiyao as Female Tenant
- Shan Yongbin as Male Tenant
- Yang Wenhao as Fat Man
- Chen Zhijun, Liang Guixin, Meng Long as Gangsters
- Zhang Yanyuan, Liu Dan, Guo Wei as Hostesses
- Zhang Peng as Drunkard
- Na Jiazuo as Narrator

== Production ==
Director Jiazuo Na met Guan Hu at the 2017 Shanghai International Film Festival. The festival funded the film via venture capital, and Guan served as supervisor for the movie.

This is director Jiazuo Na's debut feature film.

The film's original title, Gaey Wa'r, translates to "street kid" in Sichuanese.

== Release ==
The film premiered at 2021 Cannes Film Festival as part of the Un Certain Regard section. Prior to its debut it was acquired by Cercamon.

It released theatrically in China on June 16, 2021, and received a limited release in the US on July 21, 2021.

The film was released on Blu-Ray in June 2024, distributed by Dekanalog.

== Reception ==
The movie received 3.5 stars out of 4 from Simon Abrams of RogerEbert.com, characterizing the film as neo-noir. Writing for the New York Times, film critic Glenn Kenny selected it for NYT's Critic Pick.
