= Carlos Segundo =

Brazilian filmmaker

- Born: 1979 (age 46–47); Brazil
- Occupations: Director, scriptwriter
- Years active: 2013-present
- Known for: Big Bang, Sideral
- Awards: Golden Leopard winner at Locarno Film Festival

Carlos Segundo (born in 1979) is a Brazilian filmmaker. He is mostly knows for his feature debut Slits (2019), his short film Big Bang (2022) and his Oscar-shortlisted short film Sideral (2021).

== Life and career ==
He was born in São Paulo, Brazil. He teaches Audiovisual Arts in the Department of Social Communication at the Federal University of Rio Grande do Norte (UFRN). He also curates festivals, exhibitions and workshops. In 2009 he founded the production company 'O sopro do tempo'.

Segundo holds a master's degree in psychoanalysis and cinema (2011) from the Federal University of Uberlândia and a doctorate in cinema (2016) from Unicamp.

He is currently working on his second feature, Milk Powder, which received the Hubert Bals Fund and is co-produced by O sopro do tempo, Les Valseurs and Black Forest.

== Filmography ==
- Atlantic (2015)
- Ainda sangro por dentro (I Stil Bleed Inside) (2016)
- Subcutâneo (2018)
- Slits (2019) – writer, director.
- From Time to Time, I Burn (2020) – director.
- Sideral (2021) – writer, director.
- Big Bang (2022) – writer, director.

== Recognition ==
His short film Sideral (2021) was nominated at Cannes for the Palme d'Or Award and shortlisted for the 95th Academy Awards under the category Best Live Action Short Film. His short film Big Bang (2022) has been awarded with for the Golden Leopard for Best Auteur Short Film at the 75th Locarno International Film Festival.
