= Sidereal =

Sidereal, meaning "of the stars", may refer to:

- Sidereal time
- Sidereal day
- Sidereal month
- Sidereal year
- Sidereal period of an object orbiting another astronomical object
- Sidereal and tropical astrology

== See also ==
- Sideral (disambiguation)
