= Lilith Stangenberg =

German actress

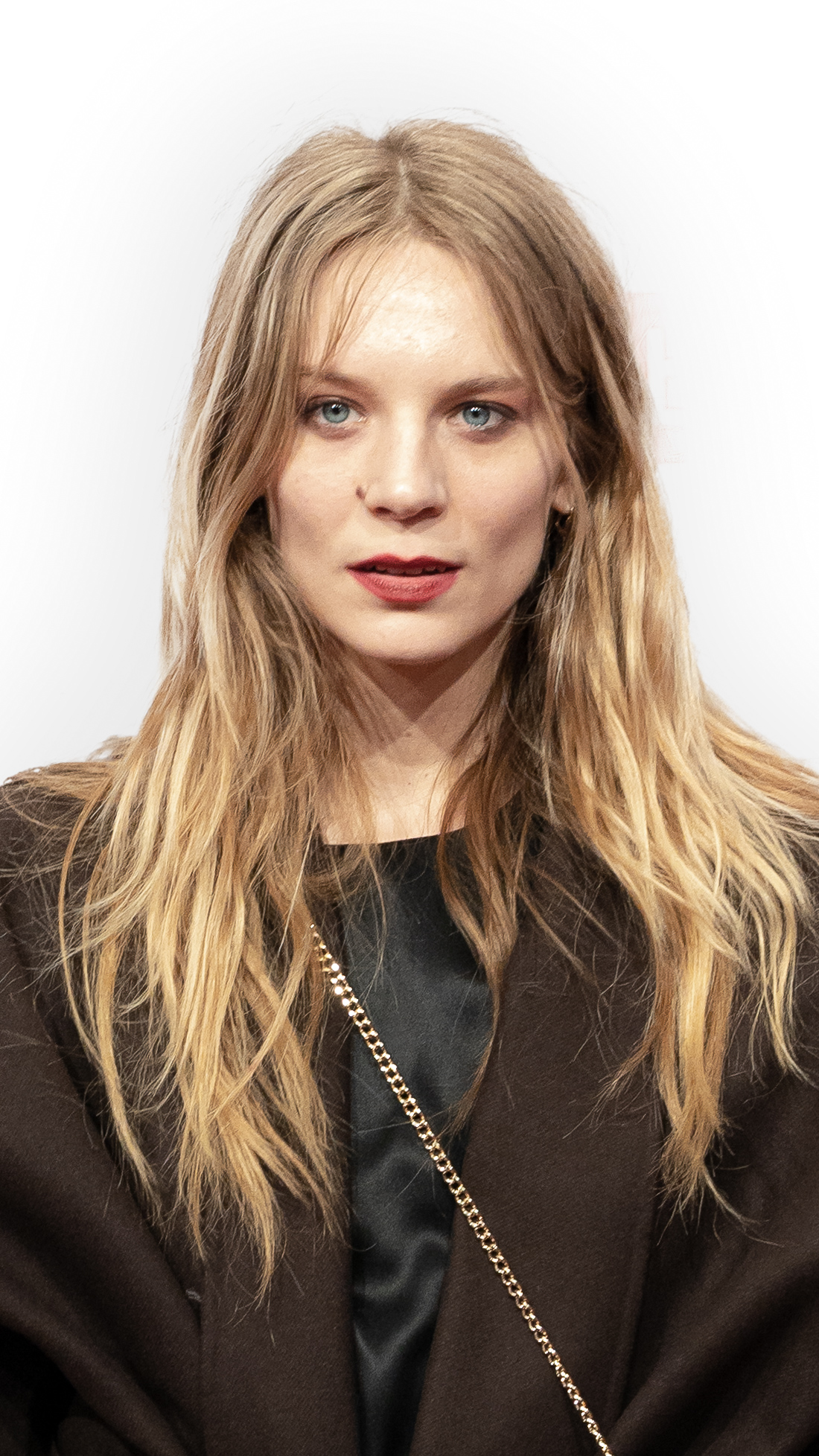
- Stangenberg in 2020
- Born: 14 August 1988 (age 37); West Berlin, West Germany
- Occupation: Actress

Lilith Stangenberg (born 14 August 1988) is a German stage and film actress. For her performance as Ania in the 2016 film Wild she won the Preis der deutschen Filmkritik. She also won the 2020 Ulrich-Wildgruber-Preis for her stage performances.

== Selected filmography ==
Year	Title	Role	Notes
2015	The People vs. Fritz Bauer	Victoria	
2016	Wild	Ania	
2018	America: Land of the Freeks		
2019	I Was at Home, But	Claudia	
2021	Bloodsuckers–A Marxist Vampire Comedy	Octavia	
2022	Dark Satellites	Aischa	
2023	Seneca – On the Creation of Earthquakes	Pompeia Paulina	
2024	Sterben	Ellen Lunies	
