= Bloodsuckers (2021 film) =

German comedy film

- Film poster
- German: Blutsauger
- Directed by: Julian Radlmaier
- Screenplay by: Julian Radlmaier
- Starring: Alexandre Koberidze; Lilith Stangenberg; Alexander Herbst; Corinna Harfouch
- Release date: March 2021 (Berlinale)
- Country: Germany
- Language: German

Bloodsuckers (German: Blutsauger) is a 2021 German comedy film written and directed by Julian Radlmaier. The film stars Alexandre Koberidze, Lilith Stangenberg, Alexander Herbst and Corinna Harfouch. It is a story of an actor who wants to try his luck in Hollywood and falls in love with a vampire. The story is a comedy revolving around a vampire, her lover and her clumsly servant.

The film has its worldwide premiere at the 71st Berlin International Film Festival in the Encounters section.

== Cast ==
The cast include:

- Alexandre Koberidze as Ljowushka
- Lilith Stangenberg as Octavia
- Alexander Herbst as Jakob
- Corinna Harfouch as Aunt Erkentrud
- Daniel Hoesl
- Andreas Dohler as Dr. Humburg
- Marie Rathscheck
- Mareike Beykirch
- Anton Gonopolski as Sergei Eisenstein
- Martin Hansen as Franz

== Awards ==
- 2021 Golden Unicorn Awards: Best Foreign Film with a Russian Connection award.

2021: Moscow International Film Festival, Special Jury Award (also nominated for Best Film)

- 2019: German Screenplay Award
