= America: Land of the Freeks =

Ulli Lommel film

- Directed by: Ulli Lommel
- Release date: 20 February 2018
- Countries: Germany; United States

America: Land of the Freeks is a 2018 pseudo-biopic mondo mockumentary film written and directed by Ulli Lommel. The film stars Lommel alongside Tanner King Barklow, Nola Roeper, and Gil Kofman. The film premiered at the 68th Berlin Film Festival February 6, 2018.

== Plot ==
Lommel travels across the United States to document Donald Trump’s new America. He is both shocked and amused by the country's gross individualism, while at the same time feels he is also a part of the "craziness." As someone who experienced the changes at first hand, he sets out with a small band of unconventional characters to experience and expose what he feels to be the crazy, the extreme and also the endearing aspects of the country.

== Premiere ==
The film was premiered at the Berlin International Film Festival in February 2018 in the Berlinale Special Program.

Variety Magazine published a review of America: Land of the FreeKS in which Owen Gleiberman wrote, "The late cult Euro hipster Ulli Lommel attempts to diagnose the "insanity" of America in the Trump era, but his gonzo satire just adds to the noise." Lommel, in the article's soundbite, sums up the subject of his movie by saying, “This whole insanity was like a disease affecting everyone.” Gleiberman writes, "Maybe so, but “Land of the Freeks,” in the screw-loose didactic way it diagnoses the noise, is just one more example of it."

== Awards ==
America: Land of the FreeKS won an Award of Recognition in Reality Programming from the Indie Fest Film Awards in February 2019. The film also won an Award of Excellence: Content and Message Delivery in the Depth of Field International Film Festival in 2019.

== Cast ==
- Ulli Lommel (as himself)
- Tanner King Barklow (Eric/Erica)
- Nola Roeper (as herself)
- Gil Kofman (as himself)
- Chris Kriesa (Colonel Brennan)
- Tatjana Lommel (Berlin Wall Engineer)
- Lilith Stangenberg (Mickey Mouse)
- Mikael Schallock (Jim)
- Peter Kondra (Jeff)
- Inka Schmietendorf (Lorry)
- Max Brauer (L.A. Radio Show Host)
- Monica Angrand (Poppy)
- Peter Kondra (Jeff)
- Mikael Schallock (Jim)
