= The Tragedy of Macbeth (2021 film) =

Film by Joel Coen

- Theatrical release poster
- Directed by: Joel Coen
- Screenplay by: Joel Coen
- Based on: Macbeth by William Shakespeare
- Produced by: Joel Coen; Frances McDormand; Robert Graf
- Starring: Denzel Washington; Frances McDormand; Bertie Carvel; Alex Hassell; Corey Hawkins; Harry Melling; Brendan Gleeson
- Cinematography: Bruno Delbonnel
- Edited by: Lucian Johnston; Reginald Jaynes
- Music by: Carter Burwell
- Production companies: A24; IAC Films
- Distributed by: Apple Original Films (through Apple TV+)
- Release dates: September 24, 2021 (NYFF); December 25, 2021 (United States)
- Running time: 105 minutes
- Country: United States
- Language: English
- Box office: $524,779

The Tragedy of Macbeth is a 2021 American tragedy film written, directed and produced by Joel Coen, based on the play Macbeth by William Shakespeare. It is the first film directed by one of the Coen brothers without the other's involvement. The film stars Denzel Washington, Frances McDormand (who also produced the film), Bertie Carvel, Alex Hassell, Corey Hawkins, Harry Melling, Kathryn Hunter, and Brendan Gleeson.

The Tragedy of Macbeth premiered at the 2021 New York Film Festival on September 24, 2021. Following a limited theatrical release on December 25, 2021 by A24, the film was distributed via streaming on Apple TV+ on January 14, 2022. The film received critical acclaim for its direction, cinematography, and the performances of Washington, McDormand, and Hunter. For his performance in the title role, Washington was nominated as Best Actor for the Academy Award, Screen Actors Guild Award, Golden Globe Award, and Critics' Choice Award. The film also received Academy Award nominations for Best Cinematography and Best Production Design.

== Plot ==
Macbeth, Thane of Glamis, and Banquo, Thane of Lochaber, having led King Duncan's army to victory over the traitorous Thane of Cawdor, are approached by three witches on the battlefield. The witches hail Macbeth as the future Thane of Cawdor and proclaim that he shall some day be King and that Banquo shall father a line of kings.

Soon thereafter, King Duncan fulfills the first prophecy by ordering the Thane of Ross to execute Cawdor and reinvest the title upon Macbeth, but King Duncan names his own son Malcolm as the prince of Cumberland, which Macbeth sees as an encumbrance to his path to the throne. When Duncan spends a night at Macbeth's castle, Lady Macbeth, aware of the prophecies, convinces her husband to commit regicide. She drugs the King's servants, and a hesitant Macbeth murders the King. At dawn, Macduff, Thane of Fife, discovers the body, and Macbeth ties up loose ends by summarily executing the servants, ostensibly as just punishment for their supposed betrayal of the King.

Fearing for his own life, Malcolm flees to England, and Macbeth assumes the throne as the new King. Uneasy over the prophecy concerning Banquo, Macbeth arranges to have him and his son Fleance murdered. Macbeth's assassins, accompanied by Ross as the Third Murderer, kill Banquo. Ross then pursues Fleance through a field.

An increasingly paranoid Macbeth becomes a feared tyrant. At a royal banquet, he hallucinates and begins raving at an apparition of Banquo. Lady Macbeth has the guests dismissed before sedating Macbeth. During his trance, Macbeth is again visited by the witches. They conjure a vision of Fleance, who tells him to beware of Macduff, that he shall be King until Great Birnam Wood comes to Dunsinane Hill, and that he shall be harmed by no man born of a woman. Macbeth orders the whole Macduff household to be slaughtered; only Macduff survives, having fled to England earlier.

A guilt-ridden Lady Macbeth gradually descends into insanity. Ross secretly visits England and informs Macduff of his family's demise. A grief-stricken Macduff vows revenge, while Malcolm raises an army with English help. The troops cut down branches from Birnam Wood, using them as camouflage, and march on Macbeth's castle at Dunsinane, fulfilling one of the prophecies. Lady Macbeth dies, implied to have been killed by Ross, plunging Macbeth into further despair. Still convinced of his invincibility, he is ultimately challenged by Macduff to a duel. Macduff declares he is not born of a woman but instead "untimely ripped" from his mother's body. Macbeth initially refuses but ultimately accepts Macduff's challenge. Macduff defeats and beheads Macbeth, fulfilling the final prophecy. Malcolm is crowned the new King of Scotland. Meanwhile, Fleance is revealed to be alive, and Ross spirits him away from Scotland. A flock of crows emerges in the foreground clearing the path and signaling the fulfillment of the witches' prophecy regarding Banquo's progeny.

== Cast ==
- Denzel Washington as Macbeth
- Frances McDormand as Lady Macbeth
- Bertie Carvel as Banquo
- Alex Hassell as Ross
- Corey Hawkins as Macduff
- Kathryn Hunter as the Witches / Old Man
- Harry Melling as Malcolm
- Brendan Gleeson as King Duncan
- Miles Anderson as Lennox
- Moses Ingram as Lady Macduff
- Ralph Ineson as the Captain
- Jefferson Mays as the Doctor
- Stephen Root as the Porter
- Matt Helm as Donalbain, Duncan's younger son
- Scott Subiono and Brian Thompson as the Murderers
- Lucas Barker as Banquo's son Fleance
- Robert Gilbert as Angus
- Ethan Hutchinson as Macduff's Son
- James Udom as Seyton
- Richard Short as Siward, English general
- Sean Patrick Thomas as Monteith
- Olivia Washington as Children’s Nurse
- Susan Berger as Lady in Waiting
- Wayne T. Carr as Lady Macduff's Murderer
- Jacob McCarthy as Wheyface
- Nancy Daly as Lady Macbeth’s Nurse
- Kayden Koshelev, Ledger Fuller, and T.K. Weaver as the Apparition Boys

== Production ==
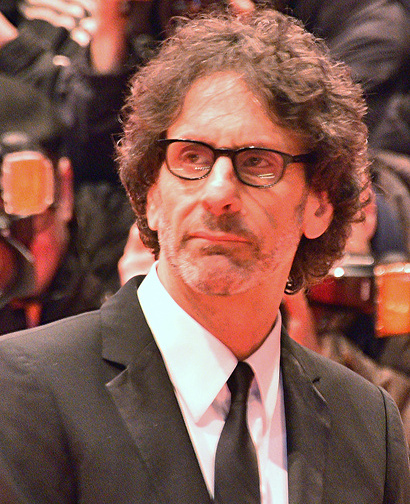
The Tragedy of Macbeth is the first film created by Joel Coen without any involvement from his brother Ethan.

It was announced in March 2019 that Joel Coen, in a rare solo effort, was set to write and direct a new take on the William Shakespeare play. Scott Rudin was originally set to produce, and A24 would distribute. Denzel Washington and Frances McDormand were set to star in the film; McDormand had previously portrayed both Lady Macbeth and one of the Three Witches in a 2016 American stage production of Macbeth. In November, Brendan Gleeson and Corey Hawkins entered negotiations to join the cast. Both were confirmed in January 2020, along with the addition of Moses Ingram, Harry Melling and Ralph Ineson to the cast.

Filming began in Los Angeles with cinematographer Bruno Delbonnel on February 7, 2020. To give the film a look "untethered from reality", it was shot entirely on sound stages. In April, Coen announced that the film would officially be titled The Tragedy of Macbeth. It was announced on March 26, 2020, that filming had been halted due to the COVID-19 pandemic. Production resumed on July 23, 2020, and concluded on July 31, 2020. In April 2021, Rudin stepped down as producer following allegations of abuse.

The film's score was composed by Carter Burwell, the Coen brothers' longtime collaborator. The score's ominous tone is punctuated by moments of solo violin described by Burwell as “taking flight out of the darkness.” Helping the composer to channel the idea of a folk-style sound from unknown lands was award-winning violinist Tim Fain. Regarding Joel directing alone without Ethan, Burwell stated, "Ethan didn't want to make movies anymore. He seems to be happy with what he's doing. They both have tons of unproduced scripts sitting on shelves, but I don't know what Joel will do without him."

The film is presented in black-and-white with an aspect ratio of 1.37:1; the production design and visual style intended to evoke German Expressionist film-makers like F. W. Murnau and Fritz Lang.

== Release ==
The film was theatrically released by A24 followed by global launch on Apple TV+. It had its world premiere at the 59th New York Film Festival on September 24, 2021, and closed the 65th BFI London Film Festival on October 17, 2021. It was released in a limited release on December 25, 2021, prior to streaming on Apple TV+ on January 14, 2022.

== Reception ==
=== Critical response ===
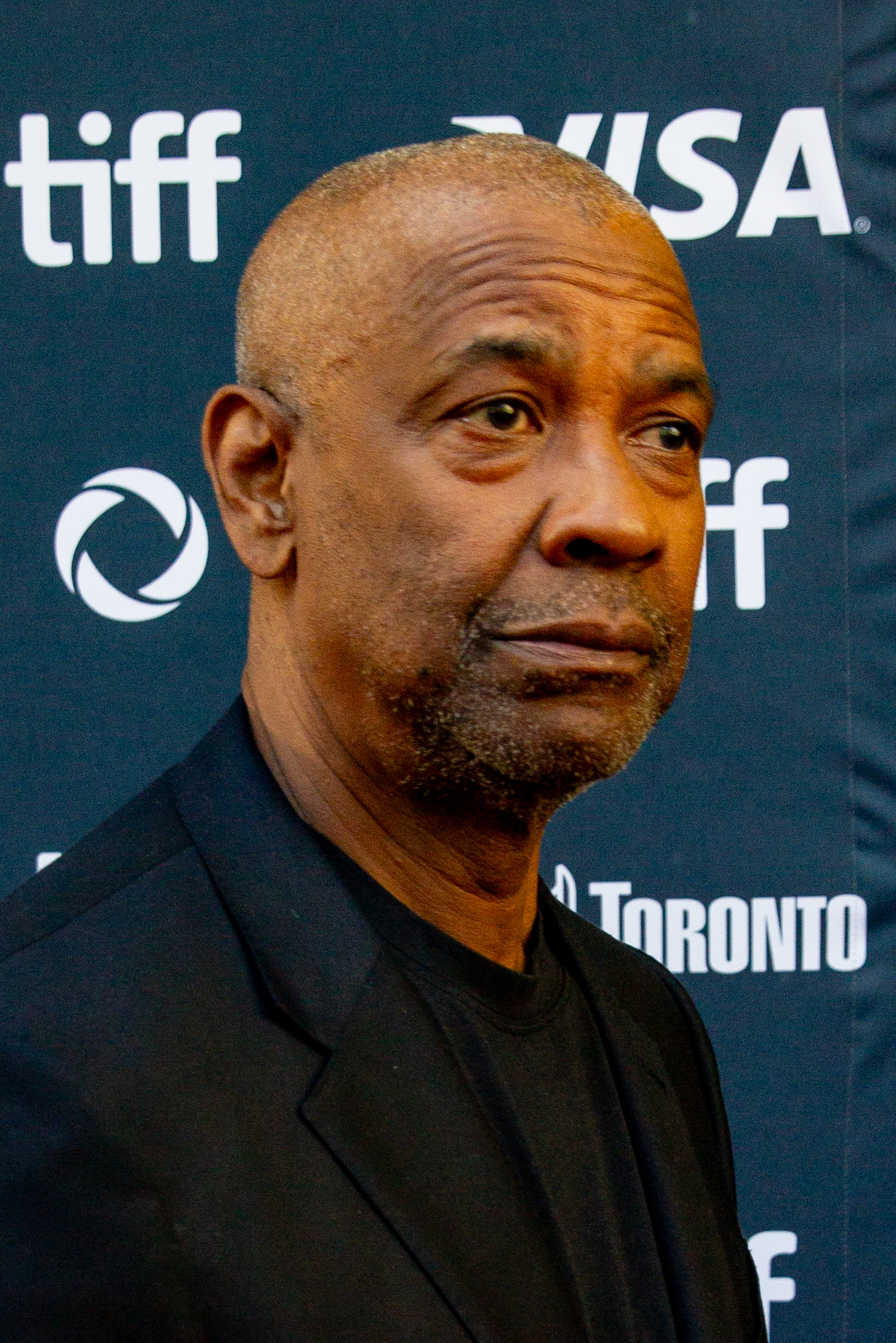
Denzel Washington received critical acclaim for his performance and earned an Academy Award nomination for Best Lead Actor.

On the review aggregator website Rotten Tomatoes, 93% of 281 critics' reviews are positive, with an average rating of 8.2/10. The website's consensus reads: "Led by a stellar Denzel Washington, The Tragedy of Macbeth strips the classic story down to its visual and narrative essentials." Metacritic, which uses a weighted average, assigned the film a score of 87 out of 100, based on 49 critics, indicating "universal acclaim".

Peter Bradshaw of The Guardian wrote: "The movie hits its stride immediately with a taut, athletic urgency and it contains some superb images – particularly the eerie miracle of Birnam Wood coming to Dunsinane, with Malcolm’s soldiers holding tree-branches over their heads in a restricted forest path and turning themselves into a spectacular river of boughs."

Alison Willmore of Vulture wrote: "[T]he movie almost seems like it could be pared down even further until it was just Macbeth and the witch, enacting this cycle in another of the purgatories that the Coen brothers have always specialized in. While The Tragedy of Macbeth is Joel Coen’s first solo directing effort...that aspect of [the Coen brothers'] long collaboration remains steady. Macbeth becomes, like so many of the Coens’ protagonists, a character trapped in his own fixations and failings, the concave world onscreen a reflection of the self he can't escape."

Dave Calhoun of Time Out wrote that it was "stage-bound in all the right ways, reminiscent of a much earlier cinema, when filmmakers barely stepped outdoors and wielded magic with shadow and light on soundstages. It’s short, sharp and savage." Robbie Collin of The Daily Telegraph wrote that it "has simmered its source text long and low, leeching every last drop of pungency and savour from the carcass", and added that it "resonates with the ancient power of a ritual."

Clarisse Loughrey of The Independent found Coen's symbolism to be "a literal manifestation of the avian imagery Shakespeare summons in his play ... a hallmark of the films he made with his brother Ethan – each of them rich, puzzle box films that use every element of composition and mood to whisper their true meaning to their audience."

Richard Roeper from the Chicago Sun-Times gave the film three and a half stars out of four, calling it "one of the most visually striking and leanest versions of 'the Scottish play' ever put on film, with blockbuster performances from Oscar winners Frances McDormand and Denzel Washington as Lady and Lord Macbeth, and a brilliant supporting cast."

Richard Brody of The New Yorker gave the film a generally negative review, stating that "Coen’s straining for seriousness and yearning for importance breaks through to the other side with the howlers of unintentional comedy ... Coen’s stripped-down adaptation sets out to normalize Shakespearean language, but he ends up going too far."
