= More Than I Want to Remember =

2022 animated short film directed by Amy Bench

- Directed by: Amy Bench
- Produced by: Mugeni Ornella; Amy Bench; Carolyn Merrima
- Animation by: Maya Edelman
- Production company: Mugeni Film
- Distributed by: MTV Documentary Films
- Release date: November 29, 2022
- Running time: 14 minutes
- Country: United States
- Language: English

More Than I Want to Remember is a 2022 animated short film directed by Amy Bench and written by Bench and Mugeni Awano. It is based on the true story of Mugeni, a young girl from the Democratic Republic of Congo. The film follows Mugeni as she escapes her village after a sudden attack and sets out on a journey across unfamiliar terrain to find her family.

The film premiered in the United States on 29 November 2022, distributed by MTV Documentary Films via Paramount+.

== Plot ==
One night, a young girl named Mugeni is forced to flee her home in a remote village in the Democratic Republic of Congo when an unexpected attack shatters her peaceful life. Separated from her family, Mugeni embarks on a perilous journey across the wilderness, navigating dangers both seen and unseen. Along the way, she encounters strangers who may be friends or foes, discovers her inner strength, and holds onto hope against all odds. Each step of her path is marked by resilience as she searches for safety and the chance to reunite with her loved ones.

== Reception ==
=== Accolades ===
| Year | Festivals | Award/Category | Status | Ref. |
|---|---|---|---|---|
| 2022 | Annecy International Animated Film Festival | City of Annecy Award | Nominated | |
| 2022 | Chicago International Children's Film Festival | Youth Jury Award, Best Documentary Film | Won | |
| 2022 | Chicago International Children's Film Festival | Global Impact Award | Won | |
| 2022 | Cleveland International Film Festival | Best Documentary Short | Won | |
| 2022 | DC Shorts Film Festival | Audience Award | Won | |
| 2022 | deadCENTER Film Festival | Best Short Animation | Won | |
| 2022 | Guanajuato International Film Festival | Best Documentary Short Film | Nominated | |
| 2022 | Hot Docs Canadian International Documentary Festival | Best International Short Documentary | Won | |
| 2022 | Sidewalk Film Festival | Audience Choice Award, Best Short | Won | |
| 2022 | Sidewalk Film Festival | Special Jury Mention, Best Documentary Short | Won | |
| 2022 | South by Southwest Film Festival | SXSW Film Design Award, Excellence in Poster Design | Won | |
| 2022 | Tribeca Film Festival | Best Animated Short | Won | |
| 2022 | Walla Walla Movie Crush | Best Animated Short | Won | |
| 2022 | Woods Hole Film Festival | Best Documentary Short | Won | |
| 2022 | Academy Awards | Best Animated Short Film | Shortlisted | |
