= Atlit (film) =

- Film poster
- Directed by: Shirel Amitaï
- Written by: Shirel Amitaï
- Produced by: Sandrine Brauer
- Starring: Géraldine Nakache; Judith Chemla; Yaël Abecassis
- Cinematography: Boaz Yehonatan Yaacov
- Edited by: Frédéric Baillehaiche
- Music by: Reno Isaac
- Production companies: En Compagnie Des Lamas; France 2 Cinéma
- Distributed by: Ad Vitam Distribution (France)
- Release dates: 2 October 2014 (Hamburg); 21 January 2015 (France)
- Running time: 91 minutes
- Countries: France; Israel
- Languages: French; Hebrew

Atlit (original title: Rendez-vous à Atlit) is a 2014 Franco-Israeli drama film written and directed by Shirel Amitaï. It stars Géraldine Nakache, Judith Chemla and Yaël Abecassis.

== Synopsis ==
A story of three sisters - Cali, Darel, and Asia - who gather in the Israeli coastal town of Atlit to sell their late parents' house in 1995. As they spend time together, their relationship is tested by resurfacing tensions and unexpected visitors who bring both chaos and joy to their lives. Set against the backdrop of the promising peace process, their story takes a dramatic turn when Prime Minister Yitzhak Rabin is assassinated on November 4. Despite this devastating blow to peace prospects, the sisters maintain their hope for a better future.

The story interweaves personal family dynamics with pivotal historical events, exploring themes of sisterhood, reconciliation, and resilience during a critical moment in Israeli history.

== Cast ==
- Géraldine Nakache as Cali
- Judith Chemla as Asia
- Yaël Abecassis as Darel
- Arsinée Khanjian as Mona
- Pippo Delbono as Zack
- Makram Khoury as Mafous
- Pini Tavgar as Dan
- Yossi Marshak as Amos
