= My Brothers and I =

2021 film

- Film poster
- Directed by: Yohan Manca
- Starring: Maël Rouin Berrandou
- Release date: 12 July 2021 (Cannes)
- Country: France
- Language: French
- Box office: $329,106

My Brothers and I (French: Mes frères et moi) is a 2021 French drama film directed by Yohan Manca. In June 2021, the film was selected to compete in the Un Certain Regard section at the 2021 Cannes Film Festival. It was also known as La Traviata, My Brothers and I when shown at the 2021 Leeds International Film Festival, where it won the Audience Award for a fiction feature.

== Release ==
The film was released in theaters on 5 January 2022. It earned $329,106 from 185 theaters in its opening weekend.

== Cast ==
- Maël Rouin Berrandou as Nour
- Judith Chemla as Sarah
- Dali Benssalah as Abel
- Sofian Khammes as Mo
