= Alexandre Koberidze =

Georgian filmmaker (born 1984)

- ალექსანდრე კობერიძე
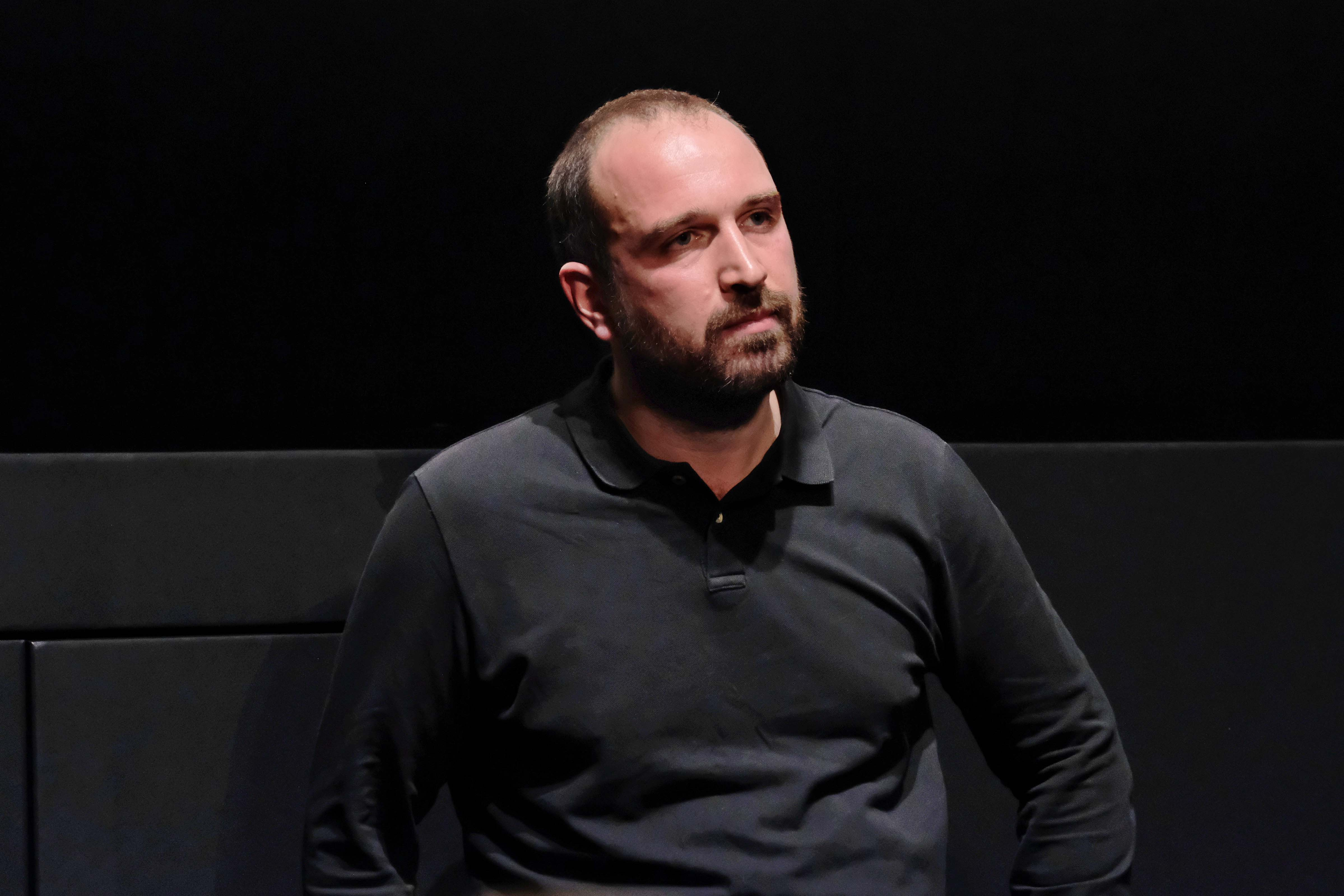
- Koberidze in 2021
- Born: 19 October 1984 (age 41); Tbilisi, Georgian SSR, Soviet Union
- Occupations: Filmmaker; screenwriter
- Years active: 2013–present

Alexandre Koberidze (Georgian: ალექსანდრე კობერიძე; born 19 October 1984) is a Georgian filmmaker and screenwriter.

Most known for the feature films Let the Summer Never Come Again (2017), What Do We See When We Look at the Sky? (2021) and Dry Leaf (2025).

== Early life ==
Born in Tbilisi, Georgia, he studied film and television there from 2001 to 2005. He then moved to Berlin in 2009 where he studied film directing at Deutsche Film- und Fernsehakademie Berlin.

== Career ==
He directed several short films before his first feature, Let the Summer Never Come Again (2017), a docufiction which won the Grand Prix and Prix Premier prizes at the Marseille Festival of Documentary Film and the German Film Critics Association Prize.

His second feature, 2021's What Do We See When We Look at the Sky?, had its world premiere at the main competition of the 71st Berlin International Film Festival, where it won the FIPRESCI Prize.

His 2025's feature film Dry Leaf will have its world premiere at the main competition of the 78th Locarno Film Festival, where it was nominated for the Golden Leopard.

== Filmography ==
=== Feature films ===
Year	English title	Original title	Notes
2017	Let the Summer Never Come Again	ნეტავ აღარასდროს მოვიდეს ზაფხული	Also editor
2021	What Do We See When We Look at the Sky?	რას ვხედავთ როდესაც ცას ვუყურებთ?	Also editor
2025	Dry Leaf	ხმელი ფოთოლი	Also producer, cinematographer and editor

=== Short films ===
Year	Title	Notes
2013	Looking Back Is Grace	Also editor
2015	Colophon	Also editor
2017	The Perfect Spectator	Also editor
2019	Linger on Some Pale Blue Dot	Also editor

=== As actor ===
Year	Film	Role
2014	A Proletarian Winter's Tale	
2017	Self-Criticism of a Bourgeois Dog	Case Worker
2017	The Invisible Film	Sandro
2021	Bloodsuckers	Ljowushka
