= Marx Can Wait =

2021 film directed by Marco Bellocchio

- Theatrical release poster
- Directed by: Marco Bellocchio
- Written by: Marco Bellocchio
- Produced by: Simone Gattoni; Beppe Caschetto
- Cinematography: Michele Cherchi Palmieri; Paolo Ferrari
- Edited by: Francesca Calvelli
- Music by: Ezio Bosso
- Production companies: Kavac Film; IBC Movie; Tenderstories; Rai Cinema
- Distributed by: 01 Distribution
- Release date: 15 July 2021 (Cannes)
- Running time: 96 minutes
- Country: Italy
- Language: Italian

Marx Can Wait (Italian: Marx può aspettare) is a 2021 Italian documentary film written and directed by Marco Bellocchio. In the film Bellocchio looks back on his twin brother's 1968 suicide and the consequences it has for him and his family.

The film had its world premiere at the Cannes Premiere section of the 2021 Cannes Film Festival, on 15 July 2021.
