= Jane by Charlotte =

2021 film directed by Charlotte Gainsbourg

Jane by Charlotte (Jane par Charlotte)
- French theatrical release poster
- Directed by: Charlotte Gainsbourg
- Written by: Charlotte Gainsbourg
- Produced by: Mathieu Ageron; Maxime Delauney; Charlotte Gainsbourg; Jessica Huppert Berman; Romain Rousseau
- Starring: Charlotte Gainsbourg; Jane Birkin
- Cinematography: Adrien Bertolle
- Edited by: Tianès Montasser; Anne Person
- Music by: Charlotte Gainsbourg
- Distributed by: Nolita Cinema; Deadly ValentineJour2Fête; Canal+ Ciné+ TV5MONDE; Indéfilms 9 Sacem
- Release date: 7 July 2021 (Cannes)
- Running time: 88 minutes
- Countries: France; United Kingdom; Japan
- Languages: French; Italian; Japanese; English; Chinese
- Box office: $174,232

Jane by Charlotte (French: Jane par Charlotte) is a 2021 French docu-drama film directed by Charlotte Gainsbourg in her directorial debut. The film was shown in the Cannes Premiere section at the 2021 Cannes Film Festival.

== Cast ==
- Charlotte Gainsbourg as herself
- Jane Birkin as herself

== Box office ==
In France, the film earned $133,152 from 79 theaters in its opening weekend.
