= Anaïs Volpé =

French actress

- Born: 1988 or 1989 (age 36–37); Toulouse, France
- Occupations: Actress, director, screenwriter
- Notable work: Heis (Chronicles)
- Website: anaisvolpe.com

Anaïs Volpé (born 1988 or 1989) is a French actress, screenwriter, and self-taught director. She is known for her 2017 film Heis (Chronicles).

== Early life ==
Anaïs Volpé was born in 1988 or 1989 in Toulouse, France.

At the age of 18, shortly after completing her Baccalauréat, she left Toulouse to live in Paris.

== Career ==
Volpé started her career as an actress and was selected for the Monday Workshops at the Théâtre national de la Colline. She then acted in several independent short and feature films.

In 2012, she taught herself film editing and directing, and created three short films to practise editing. These films, all under three minutes long, were shot and edited with minimal resources. The first mini-film, Mars ou Twix, was selected for the Mashup Film Festival at the Forum des images in Paris. The second, Cherry.58, was selected for the Mobile Film Festival, and the third, Lettre à ma sœur, shot entirely on an iPhone, was bought and broadcast by France 3. The following year, she directed her first short film, Blast, with more substantial resources and a technical team. The film won the Jury Prize at the France/China International Youth Talent Festival, leading to an invitation from the French Embassy in China and a grant from the Institut français in Beijing.

At the age of 28, she wrote, directed, and edited her first feature film, Heis (chroniques) (Heis (Chronicles)), self-produced with a budget of 3,000 euros. The film had its world premiere and won the Jury Prize at the Los Angeles Film Festival in 2016. It became eligible for the Independent Spirit Awards in the United States. The Hollywood Reporter described the film as "a poetic and sensitive vision".

The film was released in cinemas in 2017 and received a warm reception from both the press and the public. This feature film, part of the self-produced cross-media project "HEIS" (comprising a feature film, a series of five episodes of 11 minutes, and an art installation), was selected for numerous festivals · . Among them was the International Film Festival Rotterdam (IFFR), in the "Bright Future" section, which highlights young emerging directors with their own style and vision. Volpé's works have been exhibited in several art galleries in Paris, London, and Rotterdam.

One of her feature film scripts, Märlha, was selected for the Berlinale in 2017 and at La Maison des scénaristes of the Cannes Film Festival in 2016.

In 2018, Volpé was selected for the Fête du court métrage (Short Film Festival) in Paris, among 15 directors representing the next generation of French cinema. At the opening night, she was sponsored by director Julie Bertuccelli.

In 2021, she participated in the Namur International Film Festival in Belgium with her feature film The Braves (Entre les vagues).

== Awards ==
- Los Angeles Film Festival 2016: Jury Prize for Best Foreign Fiction for Heis (chronicles)
- FIFIB 2016: Prix Contrebandes for Heis (chronicles)

== Filmography ==
=== Actress ===
==== Short films ====
- 2013: Blast by Anaïs Volpé as Yaëlle

==== Feature films ====
- 2014: Paine by Gabriel Dumas Delage as Marie P.
- 2015: 600 euros by Adnane Tragha as Karine
- 2017: Heis (chronicles) by Anaïs Volpé as Pia

=== Director ===
==== Short films ====
- 2012: Mars ou Twix
- 2012: Lettre à ma soeur
- 2013: Cherry.58
- 2016: Unis
- 2018: Indemnes

==== Television series ====
- 2015: Heis (pile ou face) -

==== Feature films ====
- 2016: Heis (Chronicles)
- 2021: The Braves (Entre les vagues)
