= Yohan Manca =

French film director, writer and actor

- Born: October 9, 1989 (age 36); Fontainebleau
- Occupations: Director; writer; actor; producer
- Years active: 2011–present

Yohan Manca is a French film director, writer, actor and producer. He is best known for his work on the film, My Brothers and I (Mes frères et moi).

== Career ==
Manca co-wrote and co-directed the short film, The Bag (Le sac), along with Julien Dara in 2012. In 2017, his short film, Hédi & Sarah (Hédi et Sarah), nominated at the Syndicat Français de la Critique de cinéma in France.

Manca's debut feature film, My Brothers and I (Mes frères et moi), was selected to compete in the Un Certain Regard section at the Cannes Film Festival in 2021. He didn't attend the Cannes premiere, since he has been accused by the main actress and ex-partner Judith Chemla of domestic abuse by throwing a cell phone at her.

== Personal life ==
In May 2022, he received an eight-months suspended sentence for domestic violence and abuse over his wife, actress Judith Chemla, with whom he has a daughter. She recounts, among other things, this relationship in her book Notre silence nous a laissées seules ("Our Silence Left Us Alone"), in which the actor appears as le loup ("Wolf"), published in January 2024.

== Filmography ==
Year	Film	Director	Writer	Producer	Note
2012	The Bag (Le sac)	Yes	Yes	Yes	Short film
2017	Hédi & Sarah (Hédi et Sarah)	Yes	Yes		Short film
2020	Red Star	Yes	Yes	Yes	Short film
2021	My Brothers and I (Mes frères et moi)	Yes	Yes		Feature film

=== As actor ===
- 2011 : Léa (Short film)
- 2014 : Bête noire (Short film)
- 2018 : Escapada (Feature film)
- 2019 : Call me Matthew (Short film)
- 2019 : La vérité si je mens! Les débuts

== Awards and nominations ==
Year	Result	Award	Category	Work	Ref.
2021	Nominated	Cannes Film Festival	Golden Camera	My Brothers and I (Mes frères et moi)	
2021	Nominated	Cannes Film Festival	Un Certain Regard Award	My Brothers and I (Mes frères et moi)	
