= Avi Mograbi =

Israeli-Portuguese documentary filmmaker

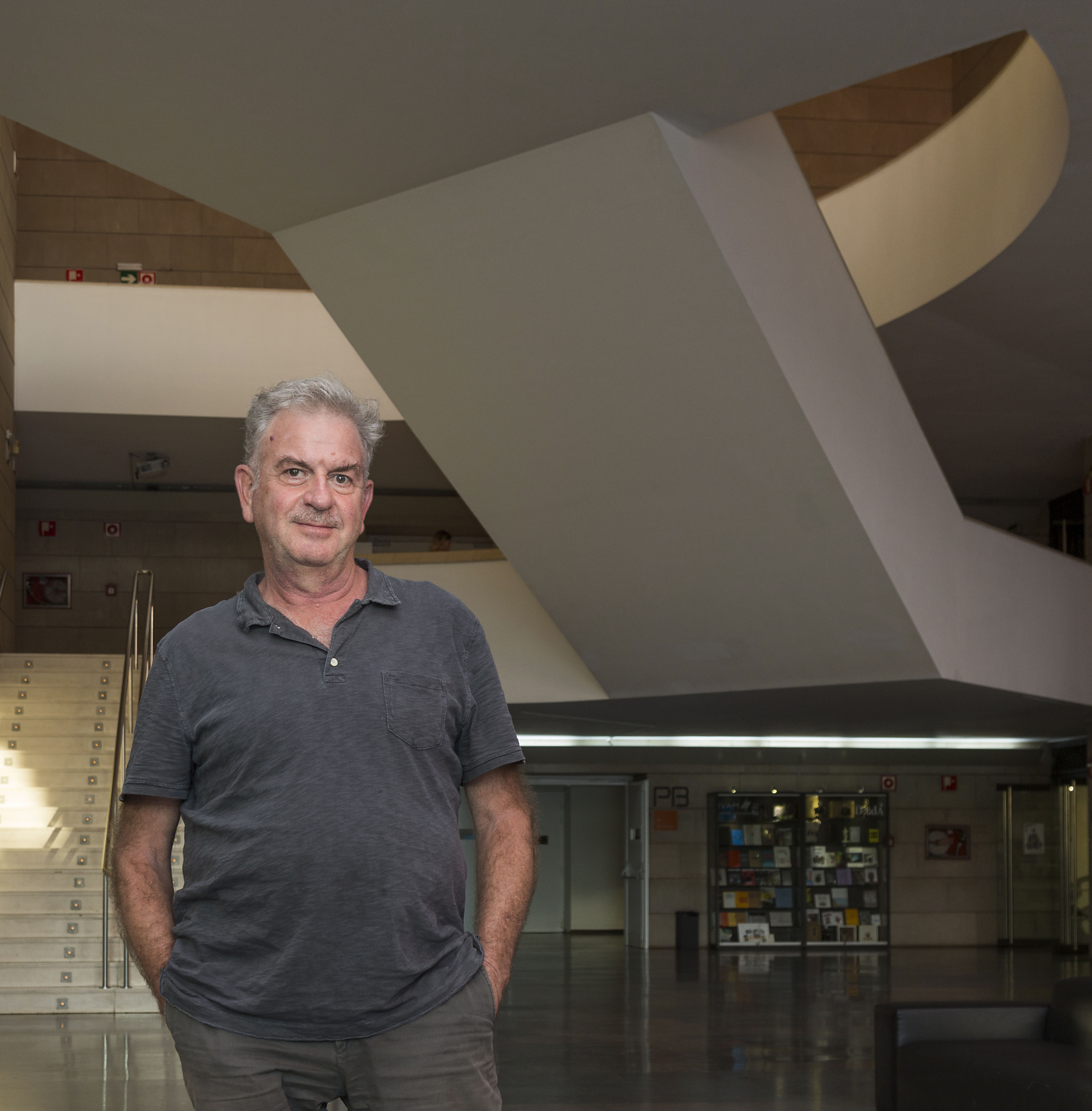
Avi Mograbi in the IVAM, Valencia.

Avi Mograbi (Hebrew: אבי מוגרבי; born May 9, 1956) is an Israeli documentary filmmaker.

== Life and career ==
Mograbi's grandfather founded The Mograbi Cinema (Kolnoa Mograbi), an Art Deco movie theatre in downtown Tel Aviv. Opened in 1930, it was probably Israel's most famous movie theater. It was the site of one of the largest celebrations following the 1948 partition and remained a vital national landmark until its demolition in the 1990s.

Avi Mograbi was born in Tel Aviv to migrant parents. His mother fled to Palestine from Germany (at that time German Reich) in the 1930s; his father was born in Beirut, Lebanon to a Syrian Jewish family. Like all Israeli citizens over the age of 18, he was required to join the Israel Defence Forces for military service. He was a non-combatant He became a reservist, and when in 1982 Israel invaded Lebanon, he was recruited to serve as a combatant. He conscientiously objected and was jailed.

He studied philosophy at Tel Aviv University from 1979 to 1982, and art at HaMidrasha Art School, Ramat HaSharon.

After working as an assistant director in local and foreign films and commercials, he began making films in 1989. Since 1999 he has taught documentary and experimental filmmaking at the University of Tel Aviv, at Jerusalem's Sam Spiegel Film and Television School and art academy and at the Bezalel Academy of Art and Design in Jerusalem.

In 2004, he became one of the founding members of Breaking the Silence, an Israeli non-governmental organisation intended to give serving and discharged Israeli personnel and reservists a means to confidentially recount their experiences in the Occupied Territories. Collections of such accounts have been published in order to educate the Israeli public about conditions in these areas.

His non-fiction films examine the Israel-Palestinian conflict using provocative and self-reflexive methods. His film, Avenge But One of My Two Eyes, which was screened out of competition at the 2005 Cannes Film Festival, investigates and critiques the paradoxes of Israeli society—which on one hand celebrates age old myths and tales of destruction and violence (for example The Siege of Masada and Samson) while condemning Palestinians for resorting to similar acts of violence.

In June 2014, Avi Mograbi was the first special guest invited by the Open City Docs Fest, who organised a retrospective of his work and also a new edition and live performance of The Details, initially presented at the University Rennes 2.

== Filmography ==
- Deportation (1989, short)
- The Reconstruction (1994)
- How I Learned to Overcome My Fear and Love Ariel Sharon (1997)
- Happy Birthday, Mr. Mograbi (1999)
- August: A Moment Before the Eruption (2002)
- Wait it's the soldiers, I have to hang up now (2002, short)
- Detail (2004, short)
- Avenge But One of My Two Eyes (2005)
- Mrs Goldstein (2006, short)
- Z32 (2008)
- Once I Entered a Garden (2012)
- Between Fences (2016)
- The First 54 Years: An Abbreviated Manual for Military Occupation (2021)
