= The Tale of King Crab =

2021 film

- Italian theatrical release poster
- Directed by: Alessio Rigo de Righi, Matteo Zoppis
- Written by: Alessio Rigo de Righi, Matteo Zoppis
- Produced by: Tommaso Bertani; Ezequiel Borovinsky; Ezequiel Capaldo; Agustina Costa Varsi; Thomas Ordonneau
- Starring: Gabriele Silli
- Cinematography: Simone D'Arcangelo
- Edited by: Andrés P. Estrada
- Music by: Vittorio Giampietro
- Production companies: Ring Film; Shellac Sud; Wanka Cine; Volpe Films; Rai Cinema
- Distributed by: Cinecittà (Italy); Shellac Films (France)
- Release dates: 10 July 2021 (Cannes); 2 December 2021 (Italy)
- Running time: 105 minutes
- Countries: Italy; Argentina; France
- Languages: Italian; Spanish
- Box office: $34,168

The Tale of King Crab (Italian: Re Granchio) is a 2021 drama film directed by Alessio Rigo de Righi and Matteo Zoppis. The film was shown in the Directors' Fortnight section at the 2021 Cannes Film Festival.

== Plot summary ==
In late 19th-century Italy, a young drunkard named Luciano is angered after the local prince blocks a gateway commonly used by civilians. Luciano breaks the gate open and is later confronted by soldiers, who beat him.

Luciano finds a golden necklace in a body of water and gifts it to Emma, whom he has begun a romance with, much to the dismay of her father, Severino. Upon learning of an apparent romantic entanglement between Emma and the prince, Luciano confronts Emma in the presence of the prince before angrily storming off.

After failing to dissuade Luciano from pursuing Emma, Severino recruits the two soldiers from earlier to kill Luciano, who survives but falls unconscious in the woods. During a religious procession in town, the two soldiers lead Emma to the gateway from the beginning, claiming the prince requested her presence. Instead, the two of them corner and rape her.

Meanwhile, Luciano awakens and makes his way back to town. In an act of spite against the prince, he sets fire to the gateway, not knowing Emma is inside, accidentally killing her. Luciano is spared prison in favor of exile to Argentina.

Five years later, in Argentina, a group of gold-seekers is in pursuit of a priest and the treasure he is after. They find and capture the priest, who—unbeknownst to the group—is actually Luciano posing as a priest, and he shows them his unusual method of treasure-hunting: placing a crab on the ground and walking whichever direction it leads him.

Luciano is freed by one of the men after agreeing to share the treasure with him, and the two of them secretly split from the group.

After much searching, the two men share a drink, at which point, the gold-seeker correctly deduces that Luciano is not really a priest. Luciano explains that he had come across a dying priest who, in exchange for a proper burial, gave him a journal detailing the legend of the treasure's location and an Indigenous myth about a secluded crab lagoon, which Luciano believes to be connected.

As Luciano finishes his story, one of the treasure-hunters they left behind manages to find them, killing the crab, shooting Luciano, and initiating a standoff. Luciano successfully kills the returning treasure-hunter, but only after his own partner has been killed, leaving Luciano the sole survivor.

With no crab to guide him, Luciano wanders aimlessly, wounded and distraught. Miraculously, he stumbles across the fabled lagoon, filled with crabs and surrounded by mountains on all sides. The film ends with a shot of Luciano and Emma, back in Italy, wading together in a body of water.

== Cast ==
- Gabriele Silli
- Maria Alexandra Lungu
- Ercole Colnago
- Bruno di Giovanni

== Production ==
The film was shot in Italy and Argentina. The film's story is based on the legend of a man who lived from the late 1800s to the early 1900s.

== Reception ==
On review aggregator website Rotten Tomatoes, the film has an approval rating of 90%, based on 42 reviews. On Metacritic, the film has a weighted average score of 73 out of 100, based on 13 critics, indicating "generally favorable reviews".

In a positive review for the Los Angeles Times Robert Abele wrote "There are times when The Tale of King Crab seems like it could have been made in the silent era, so dedicated are Rigo de Righi and Zoppis to the simple, dramatic power of what they choose to show us. Their characters search for love, justice and gold while the filmmakers make clear what they treasure: ageless tales like these." The film was a critic's pick in The New York Times. Glenn Kenny wrote "The movie's depictions of landscapes both sere and fertile, and its all-but-palpable portrayals of isolation, have echoes of the best work of Werner Herzog and Lucrecia Martel. But de Righi and Zoppis here show more genuine affinity than affected influence; they're moviemakers worth keeping an eye on."
