= What Do We See When We Look at the Sky? =

German-Georgian drama film

- Film poster
- Georgian: რას ვხედავთ როდესაც ცას ვუყურებთ?
- Directed by: Alexandre Koberidze
- Screenplay by: Alexandre Koberidze
- Starring: Ani Karseladze; Giorgi Bochorishvili; Vakhtang Fanchulidze
- Release date: March 2021 (Berlinale)
- Countries: Germany; Georgia
- Language: Georgian
- Box office: $25,549

What Do We See When We Look at the Sky? (Georgian: რას ვხედავთ როდესაც ცას ვუყურებთ?) is a 2021 German-Georgian drama film written and directed by Alexandre Koberidze. The film stars Ani Karseladze, Giorgi Bochorishvili and Vakhtang Panchulidze.

The film had its worldwide premiere at the 71st Berlin International Film Festival in March 2021.

== Plot ==
Medical student Lisa and soccer player Giorgi happen to meet twice on the same day in the Georgian city of Kutaisi. Already the first brief moment is enough for them to fall in love with each other. In the evening they meet a second time and arrange to meet in a café the next day. On the way home, Lisa is warned of a curse she has fallen victim to by a seedling, a security camera, a drainpipe and the wind. Her roommate Maya tries to calm her down and gives her a black amber ring to protect her at night.

When Lisa and Giorgi wake up the next day, they realize that they look completely different. The curse is to ensure that they do not find each other again. Both also lose their greatest talent – Lisa the medical knowledge she learned at university, Giorgi his footballing qualities. Maya tries to calm Lisa down. She advises her to call in sick at work and still meet Giorgi at the café as intended. If he actually liked her, he would understand the truth. Giorgi, on the other hand, is shocked by his transformation and is not recognized by his football coach, who expels him from the sports field as a stranger. Lisa and Giorgi go to the café that evening, as agreed, but don't recognize each other. Both assume that they were stood up by the other.

Lisa has to give up her job at the pharmacy. She finds a new job at the coffee shop where she originally intended to meet Giorgi. Giorgi also starts working for the café owner. He is supposed to guide guests into the café with sporting bets on a remotely installed pull-up bar. Although Lisa and Giorgi see each other every day, they don't recognize each other. When the soccer World Cup begins abroad, the café owner wants to attract more guests with a screen, but business is bad. Lisa's visit to a music teacher, who is said to be able to remove curses with the help of coffee and cards, is also unsuccessful. By chance, Lisa and Giorgi are cast as lovers for a film. This brings them closer to each other. When the film is presented in a cinema, both see their real faces on the screen and thus recognize each other.

In the end, the narrator questions the "strange" subject and the film itself. The work says nothing about society and is "useless," but such incidents do happen, albeit rarely.

== Cast ==
The cast include:

- Ani Karseladze as Lisa
- Giorgi Bochorishvili as Giorgi
- Oliko Barbakadze as Lisa
- Giorgi Ambroladze
- Vakhtang Panchulidze
- Sofio Tchanishvili as Ana
- Irina Chelidze
- David Koberidze as Irakli
- Sofio Sharashidze as Ana

== Release ==
On February 11, 2021, Berlinale announced that the film would have its worldwide premiere at the 71st Berlin International Film Festival in the Berlinale Competition section, in March 2021.

== Reception ==
On review aggregator website Rotten Tomatoes, the film has an approval rating of 90% based on 50 critics, with an average rating of 8/10. The website's critics consensus reads: "Refreshingly unique and ultimately enchanting, What Do We See When We Look at the Sky is an ode to love that finds magic in the mundane." On Metacritic, the film has a weighted average score of 85 out of 100 based on 12 critical reviews, indicating "universal acclaim".

Manohla Dargis of The New York Times wrote "I railed against it (in my head) and kept railing and, after a while, realized, well, I really did like it, after all".

At its premiere at the 2021 Berlinale, Boyd van Hoeij of The Hollywood Reporter commented "We see a highly accomplished work of cinematic art".

Slant Magazine's Christopher Gray called the film "an offbeat epic informed by a reverence for the past and a delicate wariness toward the future".

Glenn Kenny of RogerEbert.com commented on the film's "frequently beautiful [and] measured style".

Jessica Kiang of Variety begged a question: "Is there an opposite to the Evil Eye?" and then answered it herself: "If so, that's the gaze in What Do We See When We Look at the Sky?"
