= The Right Words =

- Directed by: Adrian Moyse Dullin
- Written by: Emma Benestan, Adrian Moyse Dullin, Éléonore Gurrey
- Produced by: Sylvain Lagrillère, Lucas Tothe
- Starring: Yasser Osmani, Aya Halal, Rama Ndongo, Sanya Salhi
- Edited by: Pierre Deschamps
- Release date: October 2021
- Running time: 15mn
- Country: France

The Right Words (French: Haut les coeurs) is a 2021 French short film directed by Adrian Moyse Dullin and co-written with Emma Benestan. The fifteen-minute short was filmed in the Parisian suburbs. It follows a group of young teenagers on a bus journey.

The short has been presented at a number of festivals, including Cannes Film Festival, Sundance Film Festival, and Chicago International Film Festival. It won awards at Palm Springs International ShortFest and Stockholm Film Festival.

== Plot ==
During a bus ride, thirteen-year-old Mahdi's older sister, Kenza, dares Mahdi to declare his love to his crush, Jada. Pressured by Kenza, Mahdi talks to Jada.

== Awards ==
Year	Festival	Award/category	Status	Ref.
2021	Cannes Film Festival	Palme d'Or Best Short Film	Nominated	
2021	Chicago International Film Festival	Best Live Action Short	Nominated	
2021	Stockholm Film Festival	Bronze Horse for Best Short Film	Won	
2021	Rome MedFilm Festival	Special Mention for International Short Film	Won	
2022	Palm Springs International ShortFest	Best Live-Action Short 15 Minutes and Under	Won	
2022	Sundance Film Festival	Short Film Grand Jury Prize	Nominated	
