= Josza Anjembé =

French filmmaker

- Born: Josza Anjembé; 1982 (age 43–44); Paris, France
- Education: Paris-VIII University
- Occupations: Director, producer, screen writer, journalist, actress
- Years active: 2004–present

Josza Anjembé (born 1982), is a French filmmaker as well as a screenwriter and journalist of Cameroonian descent. She has made several critically acclaimed short films including Le bleu blanc rouge de mes cheveux and Baltringue.

== Personal life ==
She was born in 1982 in Paris, France, to a Cameroonian father, a roofer; and French mother who is a nurse. Josza has a twin brother. She grew up in Bondy until age 7 and then moved to Les Lilas, Seine-Saint-Denis in the towns of Pantin and Pré-Saint-Gervais.

== Career ==
After her baccalauréat (ES section), Josza obtained a master's degree in 2004 in Communication at the University of Paris 8 Vincennes-Saint-Denis. From 2004, Josza worked as a journalist for TF1 and then for France 5 and France 2 television channels. Between 2009 and 2011, she was an image reporter for the Africa 24 television channel. In 2011, Josza produced the documentary, Massage à la camerounaise. The film is selected by the Festival International de Programmes Audiovisuels (FIPA festival of Biarritz), as well as that of Montreal and Créteil.

In 2012, she was awarded the Fondation Bleustein-Blanchet vocation grant. In 2014, she participated in "Talents en court" of the Jamel Comedy Club, which is a device through which she hoped to make her first short film. Between 2013 and 2016, she worked as a member of festival "Buzzons against sexism". In 2014, she followed training in production assistant at Center for International Food and Agricultural Policy (CIFAP). Then she followed the course of image analysis at Institut national de l'audiovisuel (INA). In March 2014, the documentary is diffused on the Parliamentary chain as well. In 2012, she directed the second documentary, KRUMP: a history of the Krump in France. For the film, she followed a group of dancers for four years. The film is selected at the Festival of Urban Cultures in Paris. The film based on the KRUMP (for "Kingdom Radically Uplifted Mighty Praise", or "Powerful praise of a radically elevated kingdom"), which is a dance inspired by the "clown dancing", invented in 1992 by Thomas Johnson.

In 2015, she obtained the Festival Grant offered by Kiss Films and the Centre national du cinéma et de l'image animée (CNC) for further film productions. In 2016, she studied the script of Le Groupe Ouest. At the same year, she became a member of the juries of the National Action "The 24h of the 24h of achievements". In 2016, Josza directed her maiden live–action short film, Le bleu blanc rouge de mes cheveux (meaning 'The Blue White Red of My Hair'). The film received international critical acclaim and received more than 37 awards in over 170 film festivals and was nominated for the French Oscars (Les César du Cinéma). The film was selected in the category "Best short film" at César Awards. The film was shot for seven days in Rennes in September 2015 with a budget of 100,000 euros. She also composed and performed the music for the end credits as well.

In 2017, she continued to work as a journalist, notably for Canal + Afrique. Then in the same year, she became a member of the Paris Virtual Film Festival and festival of Saint-Paul-Trois-Châteaux. Apart from film making, Josza also conducts lessons at the Miroir school, at Le Bal-La fabrique du regard, and at Centres d'Entrainement aux Méthodes d'Education Active (CÉMÉA).

In 2019, she released two short films: French Touch: Coming of Age which is a co-production with Hadrien Bichet, Sébastien de Fonseca, Caroline Poggi and Jonathan Vinel. The other film is Baltringue which was shot with a small budget of 20,000 euros. The film received the France Televisions Prize 2020.

== Filmography ==
Year	Film	Role	Genre	Ref.
2011	Cameroonian massage	Director, writer	documentary	
2012	KRUMP, a history of Krump in France	Director, writer	documentary	
2013	Princesses Bossédi	Director, writer	documentary	
2016	Le bleu blanc rouge de mes cheveux (French)	Director, writer	short film	
2017	Fraternité	Director, writer	documentary	
2017	Debout	Actress: policewoman	film	
2019	Baltringue (Freed)	Director, writer	short film	
2019	French Touch: Coming of Age	Director, writer	short film	
2019	Three Blades	Special thanks	short film	

== Awards and accolades ==
- HP Bridging the Borders Award at Palm Springs International Short Film Festival 2017 – The Blue White Red of My Hair
- Jury Prize at Louvain International Short Film Festival 2018 – The Blue White Red of My Hair
