= Sideral =

- Directed by: Carlos Segundo
- Written by: Carlos Segundo
- Produced by: Mariana Hardi, Pedro Fiuza, Damien Megherbi, Justin Pechberty
- Starring: Priscilla Vilela, Ênio Cavalcante, Fernanda Cunha
- Edited by: Jérôme Bréau, Carlos Segundo
- Release date: July 2021
- Running time: 15 minutes
- Countries: Brazil, France

Sideral is a 2021 short film directed by Carlos Segundo. The fifteen-minute story shot in Black & White is a glimpse into the lives of a Brazilian family impacted by the extraordinary event of rocket launch from a nearby centre. The short has been presented in a number of festivals, including Cannes Film Festival and the Clermont-Ferrand Film Festival, Telluride Film Festival and won several awards, including the Oscar Qualifying award for Best International Short at the 2022 Palm Springs International Shorts Fest.

== Plot ==
In the coastal city of Natal, north-east of Brazil, the first ever rocket launch of the country is about to happen. As the spacecraft leaves the Earth, the lives of a family living nearby will be drastically impacted.

== Reception ==
Since its world premiere at the 2021 Cannes Film Festival, the film has been selected in various festivals and academies around the world:

Year	Festivals	Award/Category	Status
2021	Cannes Film Festival	Palme d'Or - Best Short Film	Nominated
2021	Hamptons International Film Festival	Golden Starfish Award for Best Narrative Short	Nominated
2021	Chicago International Film Festival	Gold Hugo Award for Best Live Action Short.	Won
2022	Clermont-Ferrand International Short Film Festival	Grand Prix National	Nominated
2022	Clermont-Ferrand International Short Film Festival	Canal+ Award	Won
2022	Palm Springs International Shorts Fest	Special Jury Award for Best International Short	Won
2022	LA Shorts Fest	Best Drama	Won
2022	HollyShorts Film Festival	Best Director (Carlos Segundo)	Won
2022	Norwich Film Festival	Best International Film	Won
