= Benedetta Carlini =

Italian mystic and nun (1590–1661)

Personal life
- Born: 20 January 1590 Vellano
- Died: 7 August 1661 (aged 71) Pescia
- Home town: Vellano

Religious life
- Religion: Catholic
- Order: Congregation of the Mother of God
- Ordination: 1619

Senior posting
- Teacher: Paolo Ricordati
- Post: Abbess (1619–1623)

Benedetta Carlini (20 January 1590 – 7 August 1661) was an Italian Catholic nun. As abbess of the Convent of the Mother of God at Pescia, she was best known for her claims of experiencing mystic visions as well as a reported lesbian relationship with a nun. Her scandalous career resulted in life imprisonment until her death in 1661.

The case of Benedetta was described in the 1985 nonfiction book Immodest Acts: The Life of a Lesbian Nun in Renaissance Italy by Judith C. Brown, later fictionalized in the 2021 film Benedetta.

== Early life ==
Benedetta Carlini was born on 20 January 1590, in Vellano, located in the Apennine Mountains, 45 miles (72 km) northwest of Florence. She was born as an only child to Giuliano Carlini, a landlord who owned various properties in Vellano, and Midea Carlini (née d'Antonio Pieri), a sister of the village's parish priest. Giuliano selected the name Benedetta, meaning “blessed,” and designated her for a religious vocation from birth. Soon after her birth, her family retired to her father's farm in the mountains.

Giuliano assumed responsibility for his daughter’s education, a role that typically belonged to mothers in Renaissance Italian households. She had memorized several prayers, including the Litany of the Saints, by the age of five. Under her father's tutelage, Benedetta recited the Litany on her rosary several times a day. A year later she had learned to read and knew some Latin.

Her mother instructed her to recite five Our Fathers and eight Hail Marys every day, seemingly directing Benedetta toward female guides—the Virgin Mary, a statue of whom had been acquired especially for Benedetta, and St. Catherine of Siena, whose feast day was widely celebrated. In spring 1599, Giuliano decided to fulfill his vow by bringing Benedetta to be brought up by a group of religious women in Pescia.

== Career ==
In 1599, 9-year old Carlini was left to join a semi-monastic community founded nine years earlier (in 1590) by Piera Pagni, the widow of a prominent Pesciatine. The community did not live in a regularly enclosed convent, and were not recognised religious sisters; they led a communal life engaged in prayer, spiritual exercises and production of raw silk. This community were nicknamed Theatines by locals despite their gender, as they were backed by male organization Fathers of the Holy Annunciation, founded by Piera's relative Antonio Pagni. Pagni offered holistic services for the cheap price of 160 scudi, compared to most convents' requests of dowries of 1500 scudi, which was considered to be affordable by Carlini's parents. Carlini was considered to be an obedient and faithful woman in her early years by her peers.

In 1610, the community acquired a farm in the commune of Fucecchio for 1750 scudi, becoming economically successful and self-sufficient. The group's annual revenues came to 300 scudi, of which half came from the silk work done by its members and the rest from their dowries and from this farm and others. Thus, the following year, they received permission from Rome to organize a general chapter and accept new girls. A convent building was built and enlarged within years.

== Visions ==
In 1614, 23-year old Carlini started reporting supernatural visions; they were fantastical in nature, often involving imagery of Heaven and internal encouragement. Carlini would always emerge a more determined and faithful figure, notifying her superiors of them while seeking guidance. On the contrary, witnesses noted that Carlini went into a trance-like state, uttering gibberish and gesticulating in incomprehensible ways during such visions. Carlini was recommended by her superiors to resist such visions by praying, only to suffer various ailments from mental anguish for two years without visions.

In 1617, Carlini started having visions in her sleep, though this return pivoted into traumatic experiences; she would envision men tempting her to divert from her monastic lifestyle while also beating her to near-death. These incidents finally came to the community's attention after she came forward to her superiors for help instead of sleeping; young Bartolomea Crivelli was assigned to watch over her in case of danger. Carlini was also excused from participation in daily routines due to her poor condition.

In 1618, the community's staff resettled to a newly built convent building in a solemn procession. Carlini envisioned fantastical visions of angels and flowers during this walk, going into a trance yet again; many witnessed her in this state, making her poor mental state known to the public.

== Supernatural events ==
Three months after the resettlement, on the second Friday of Lent, Benedetta received the stigmata. By her own words, these appeared between two and three at night when she was in bed. She saw a crucifix and bright rays from wounds of Christ to her head, hands, feet and side of the chest. These rays caused tremendous pain, but then Benedetta felt such contentment in her heart that she had never experienced before. Bartolomea Crivelli witnessed the event, helping her up and discovering red marks like small rosettes on Benedetta's hands, feet, and side, and also a deep red band around her head, but it was bloodless. The stigmata were the first material evidence of supernatural phenomena that happened with Benedetta. She was elected as abbess sometime between February and May 1619 for this event.

Paolo Ricordati of the Fathers of the Holy Annunciation regularly visited the convent to hear Carlini give sermons to the other nuns while they purified themselves with their whips as part of their penance. Ricordati was impressed by Carlini's trance-like state during her sermons, noting her to be an exception to her role's men-only nature.

On 21 March 1619, Ricordati summoned Carlini and told her: "Today is the day of St. Benedict, your saint's day, go in ecstasy at your pleasure, I give you permission." It was an experiment to examine if her visions would come on command. That evening, during compline, Benedetta fell into a trance more powerful than the last, where an apparition claiming to be Jesus was the centre of it.

Once settled in their new quarters, the Theatines began the final round of administrative procedures to become a regular convent. In 1619, they asked Pope Paul V to grant them complete enclosure. When the papal officials who handled such petitions received the request, they asked the provost of Pescia to send in a report about them.

== Wedding incident ==
On 20 May 1619, Carlini had a vision where Jesus instructed her to initiate a marriage between them both, with highly detailed instructions on the ceremony's item placement and rituals. She doubted this as an act of temptation by Satan, but was surprised to see it be approved by Ricordati. A servant was sent to borrow an altar cloth from several people outside the convent, with other religious institutions in the vicinity to contribute candles and other convents contributing pillows and flowers.

Word of the event spread and many wanted to participate, but, no one, not even Father Ricordati, was allowed by the provost to enter the convent during the preparation or the ceremony itself; the community had amassed an overwhelming amount of gifts from fellow passing Catholics.

On 27 May 1619, the morning of Holy Trinity, Carlini heard an inner voice telling her that she should dress the two novices as angels. She quickly wrote a note to Father Ricordati to obtain his permission. This done, she and the others went to Choir, where she picked up a basket of flowers, scattered its content throughout, and then lit the candles, giving one to each. Benedetta instructed nuns to get on their knees and to do as she instructed. Taking up the crucifix, she began to intone Veni Creator Spiritus as she led a procession out of the choir, onto the garden, and then back around the choir where all of them sang various hymns and the litanies to the Virgin. After scattering incense and bowing several times in the direction of the altar, Carlini knelt and resumed singing by herself. Her voice was scarcely audible and her words could not be made out. After more visions of Jesus, Benedetta finally spoke audibly to the surprise of witnesses, in a more beautiful tone than her usual voice. Carlini returned to her own senses at the end of the ceremony and left as if nothing happened. Along the way, she stopped to chat with the wife of the Vicar who, in defiance of the provost's orders, had come to the convent to witness the wedding.

This incident was deduced by some to be fraudulent on Carlini's part; women were denied a place in the social and public discourse at the time, with little leeway for their voices to be heard. It was proposed that Carlini faked everything for approval from fellow monastic staff as well as praise from the most faithful.

== The First Investigation ==
The wedding incident came to the attention of many, offending powerful individuals such as Provost of Pescia Stefano Cecchi and Pescian secular authorities. Carlini's claim that Jesus had said extravagant words of praise for her and threatened damnation to those who did not believe in her was one point of scrutiny due to its uncharacteristically aggressive nature. To their horror, Carlini's news had spread to the public to the point of mass interest in her acts; the public were ordered not to discuss the incident as a result.

On 28 May 1619, the day after this ceremony, he came to examine Carlini himself. Benedetta was relieved of her duties as abbess until further notice, and Felice di Giovanni Guerrini came to this duties. Cecchi first examined the stigmata of Benedetta Carlini since they were the only visible signs of miraculous intervention. Christ had said during Benedetta's sermon of the previous day that the wounds on her body would be open and larger in appearance than before. The provost, therefore, looked at her hands, feet, and side, where he could see bits of dried blood about the size of a small coin. When they were washed with warm water, each revealed a small opening from which drops of fresh blood trickled out. When the blood was dried with a towel, more came out. On Benedetta's head were many bloody marks, which also bled into the towel when washed with warm water. The stigmata, which days ago had been nothing more than small red marks, had changed just as Christ predicted. Then the provost asked Benedetta to recount how wounds came to be on her body. She told about five days from the crucifixion in her vision during Lent and about that she felt pain not all time: "On Sundays, they seem to be numb; on Mondays and Tuesdays I have almost no pain; and all the other days I have great pain, especially on Fridays."

After the first visit of the provost, Carlini went into a trance-like state yet again and wrote two letters, respectively to Ricordati and Cecchi. But after the trance, she could remember only former, in which she asked her father confessor for permission to write directly to the provost or meet with him. Ricordati denied her request because if Christ wanted to communicate with the provost, he would find other means for doing so. But then Ricordati forwarded to Cecchi the letter that Benedetta had written to himself. Benedetta did not know about this, and when Cecchi came again on 7 June 1619 and asked her what she wanted to tell him, she seemed nonplussed and had nothing to say. The provost had examined Benedetta's stigmata again and saw a few changes. The wound on the right hand did not bleed when washed and dried with a towel. The puncture marks on the head were also dried and looked partly healed. The provost was perplexed, but there was nothing to be done, and the visit came to an end. Fourteen further times between late May and early September were recorded.

On 14 June, the observation of stigmata revealed that some of the wounds that had almost healed the week before were now bleeding again. The provost ordered Carlini to cut her hair and wash her head to make the wounds more visible. Benedetta was allowed to leave the room briefly to rearrange and close her garments before returning for further questioning. Suddenly she ran back in, holding her hands to her head. "Jesus, what is this?" she exclaimed as blood gushed down her face and onto the floor. The visitors managed to staunch the blood with towels. The examination had to be stopped and postponed because Benedetta was in too much pain to continue.

In June 1619, Benedetta revealed to Father Ricordati that she had again seen Jesus in a vision. This time he was an angry and vengeful Christ with an unsheathed sword ready to strike and he threatened to punish the people of Pescia with the plague for their grievous sins while no one was willing to ask for mercy. Benedetta offered to pray for his mercy herself and to be the instrument of the town's salvation by spending her time in Purgatory until the day of judgment. Christ's anger seemed to be appeased by her words. He told her to continue to love him always and to arrange for processions to placate him. Ricordati gave her permission to organize a procession with an image of Christ at the head.

On 23 July, Cecchi met with Felice di Giovanni Guerrini, Bartolomea Crivelli and with another nun, Margherita d'Iptolito Ricordati, a relative to Paolo Ricordati. Their testimonies did not result in any major new revelations. The main obstacle to officially sanctioned public recognition was the absence of a ring on Benedetta's finger. Other nuns were unable to see it because she always covered up that hand but Margherita Ricordati said that she saw a yellow band with a cross that didn't look like a ring. When Benedetta was called to the examination room, she had an ordinary, inexpensive gold ring on the fourth finger of her right hand. On the top side of a ring, there were five points the size of ordinary pinheads. A point in the middle was dark red. The examiners were eager to probe further, but Carlini felt too ill to answer. Checchi and other investigators concluded that Benedetta's visions were genuine and conformed to church dogma and practice.

After one last visit in July 1620 as closure, the Pope issued on 28 July the bull that made this female religious community a fully enclosed convent. According to the nuns' wishes, it was called the Congregation of the Mother of God and would be under the protection of St. Catherine of Siena. No longer would they have to go outside their convent to hear Mass, but more importantly, as nuns, their vows of poverty, chastity, and obedience would become solemn vows. Any nun wishing to leave the convent could be constrained to stay by her superiors and by the secular authorities. (Note: At that time, a nun could be coerced by the force of secular authorities to stay or return to the convent if she tried to escape. For example, the Council of Trent stated that "The holy council ... commands all bishops that ... they make it special care that in all monasteries subject to them by their own authority and in others by the authority of Apostolic See, the enclosure of nuns be restored wherever it has been violated and that it be preserved where it has not been violated; restraining with ecclesiastical censures and other penalties, every appeal being set aside, the disobedient and gainsayers, even summoning for this purpose, if need be, the aid of the secular arm. The holy council exhorts all Christian princes to furnish this aid, and binds thereto under penalty of excommunication to be incurred ipso facto all civil magistrates. No nun shall after her profession be permitted to go out of the monastery, even for a brief period under any pretext whatever, except for a lawful reason to be approved by the bishop; any indults and privileges whatsoever notwithstanding. Neither shall anyone, of whatever birth or condition, sex or age, be permitted, under penalty of excommunication to be incurred ipso facto to enter the enclosure of a monastery without the written permission of the bishop or the superior") Similarly, any laypersons trying to enter the convent without permission could also be punished. After the convent was granted full enclosure, Carlini was reinstated as abbess.

Little was documented of Carlini's career after the convent's full conversion, hinting at a relatively peaceful and less turbulent period in her life. When the nuns were cloistered and could not leave the convent area even for a short time, a board of outside administrators had been established in the fall of 1620 to aid Benedetta with some of her tasks. Members of the board helped to manage the convent's properties and to market its silk and agricultural products.

Guiliano Carlini died between November 1620 and March 1621. Soon after that, when Benedetta went into her trances, she began envisioning her imminent death, to the point began to speak about her death and even had her grave opened and readied for the day when it would be needed.

On 25 March 1621, the day of Annunciation, Carlini passed out and was declared dead, with nuns who witnessed the event notifying Ricordati; she miraculously woke up and told of another vision about death.

== Subsequent investigation ==
Sometime between August 1622 and March 1623, Alfonso Giglioli, a newly appointed papal nuncio in Florence, decided to re-investigate Carlini's case and sent several of his officials. These investigators were more sceptical than previous. Unlike the Theatine nuns, Paolo Ricordati, or Stefano Cecchi, they had nothing to gain from Carlini's claims.

Investigators singled various points out as scrutiny; Carlini's mystical experiences contained immodest and lascivious language, especially an excess in self-praise and threats to non-believers. Her so-called angels bore peculiar names - Splenditello, Tesauriello Fiorito, Virtudioello, and Radicello. One contradiction involved the Virgin asking her to obtain permission from Father Ricordati to have a guardian angel but, before this request, such an angel had already appeared in her early visions. Her visible stigmata was determined to not be the marks of Christ but of Satan's, as they appeared not during the fervor of prayer, in the harshness of the wilderness, or during a long period of solitude, but during slumber where Satan resides. They did not believe Carlini had demonstrated any virtue of significance, adding this to their doubts; the mere concept of a "marriage" with Jesus was already contentious from their part.

Testimonies provided by other nuns emboldened the deduction of Carlini falsifying everything from the beginning. Two nuns spied on Benedetta through the hole in her study door more than twenty times, seeing her renew her wounds with a large needle on most occasions. Another nun had seen her put her blood on a statue of Jesus, only to claim to have bled in honour of her sanctity to her superiors. Other witnesses saw that she had made the star herself with some gold foil and fixed it on her forehead with red wax, in contrast to a claim of it being gifted from Heaven. When she spoke as an angel in one of her ecstasies, that the Theatines could learn from her how to flagellate themselves with true spiritual fervour. The nun, who had been standing nearby, noticed that Benedetta didn't strike herself even once, and that to make it seem as though she had she smeared the whip with blood from her wounds in her hand. Three nuns also reported that she sometimes ran barefoot through the convent as if her feet were healed, and one heard her exclaim as she jumped down from a small table, "Whoever saw me jump down would say that there's nothing wrong with my feet." Carlini was also caught eating salami and mortadella in private on one occasion in spite of her aversions to such foods.

Bartolomea Crivelli was then asked to offer her testimony. The less incriminating reveal involved her discovery of a small brass box containing diluted saffron in Carlini's desk. This saffron and Benedetta's blood probably had been used to paint the ring. Crivelli also revealed a lesbian affair between the two, taking place during Carlini's visions where she would embody one of her "guardian angels", forcibly drag Crivelli onto her bed and engage in sexual acts; said "angel" would claim it was not a sin for Carlini would be unaware of the events. Carlini refuted all claims related to her sexuality.

The second investigation had been completed on 5 November 1623, when the clerics submitted their final report to the nuncio. Then they saw no traces of the stigmata and the ring on Carlini's body. And when she was asked about angels, visions, apparitions, revelation and ecstasies, Carlini answered that she no longer saw any of them, having apparently left the community and joined another convent as a nun. The investigators concluded that "all the things that were done in her or by her, not only those which are deemed sinful, but also the other deeds which were held to be supernatural and miraculous were done without her consent or her will, since they were done while she was out of her senses by the work of the devil." Also, they concluded that the ineptness of Paolo Ricordati was a crucial factor in allowing the situation to continue as long as it did. While the ecclesiastical investigators who wrote the last report on Benedetta seemed disposed toward leniency and emphasized her lack of consent and will, the final judgement need not necessarily absolve her from guilt. It would be up to the nuncio to determine in which direction the sentence and punishment would go.

== Later life and death ==
Information pertaining to the Nuncio's decision and Carlini's later life are limited, with the only written account being found on the fragment to a diary belonging to an unnamed nun. She wrote on 7 August 1661 claiming that "Benedetta Carlini died at age 71 of fever and colic pains after eighteen days of illness. She died in penitence, having spent thirty-five years in prison." The words in the diary suggest that Benedetta was not imprisoned until 1626, three years after the second investigation. The official decision about Benedetta's imprisonment has not survived.

The conditions of Benedetta's imprisonment were most likely harsh. Ecclesiastical authorities had adopted Constitution by St. Teresa, who stated that sins of the flesh are the gravest of nuns' faults. And the punishment for these sins must be solitary confinement for life. The guilty sister "shall in no case, even though she repent and implore mercy and pardon, be received back into the community, save if some reasonable cause supervene and on the recommendation and advice of the visitor". Other nuns, except wardens, must not speak with the punished one or send her anything under pain of suffering the same penalty. A sister in prison should have her veil and scapular taken away. She should be let out only to hear mass and to follow the other nuns to the place where they disciplined themselves with their whips. On those days, she might be allowed to eat on the floor of the refectory, near the door so that the others might step over her as they left the room. Several times a week, she should receive only bread and water for sustenance.

Word of Carlini's death of spread quickly outside the convent walls due to her notoriety staying decades after her imprisonment; her funeral proceedings required additional security as a crowd curious by Carlini's incidents spread outside the church.

== Alternative interpretations of Carlini ==
E. Ann Matter, a feminist religious scholar, has an alternative perspective on the case of Benedetta Carlini, and wrote about it in the Journal of Homosexuality in 1990. She compared and contrasted two autobiographical accounts from Benedetta Carlini and another 17th-century Italian Catholic mystic, Maria Domitilla Galluzzi of Pavia. Carlini and Galluzi were both self-designated visionaries and highly regarded by their religious and secular communities, but each was subject to suspicion and close scrutiny by church hierarchy. Benedetta Carlini's trial records related the aforementioned series of sexual contacts with Bartolomea, while Maria Domitilla Galluzzi seems to have had no sexual experiences within her own mystical framework. Matter's article questioned whether scholars might have succumbed to the temptation to simply transpose the sexual self-understanding of figures in their own historical context to past historical environments. "Lesbian nun" might be viewed as too simplistic a description, and alongside Maria Galluzzi, Benedetta Carlini's sexuality "might be viewed as organised around an elaborate organic connection between the spiritual and the sensual."

Judith C. Brown chronicled Carlini's life in Immodest Acts: The Life of a Lesbian Nun in Renaissance Italy (1986), which discussed the events that led to her significance for historians of women's spirituality and lesbianism. Matter has written extensively on Galluzzi in other contexts, and Brown's study of Carlini occurs in greater depth than that of her counterpart.

More recently, Brian Levack has analysed the Carlini case and others in the context of his work on demonic possession and exorcism in the Baroque era of 17th and 18th century Europe. He notes that the case in question was anomalous, as according to Carlini's account, she was possessed by an angelic entity, Splenditello, when she had sex with Sister Bartolomea. Levack departs from the above authors in placing the event in philosophical and historical context, noting the rise of nominalism within 17th and 18th century Catholic thought, which attributed greater scope for agency and supernatural activity from demonic entities than had previously been the case. Such signs were described as convulsions, pain, loss of bodily function (and other symptoms that one might describe as apparent epilepsy from this description), levitation, trance experiences, mystical visions, blasphemy, abuse of sacred objects and vomiting of particular objects as well as immoral actions and gestures and exhibitionism. Levack argues that this provided the female subjects of exorcist rituals with the chance to engage in relative social and sexual agency compared to gender role expectations of social passivity. Possession was a form of dramaturgy and religious theatre, Levack argues, as was demonology. According to Levack, then, Carlini and other recorded instances of Baroque possession were engaged as active participants within a social ritual and theatrical performance that reflected contemporary Baroque religious culture.

== Cultural depictions ==
In popular culture, Canadian playwright and director Rosemary Rowe has written a play about her affair with Sister Bartolomea, Benedetta Carlini: Lesbian Nun of Renaissance Italy.

Paul Verhoeven directed a film loosely based on Carlini's life called Benedetta. She is portrayed by Belgian-born actress Virginie Efira, with the film premiering on 9 July 2021 in competition for the Palme d'Or at the 74th Cannes Film Festival.

== See also ==
- Female sodomy

== Bibliography ==
- Baynes, T. S., ed. (1878), "Annunciation" , Encyclopædia Britannica, vol. 2 (9th ed.), New York: Charles Scribner's Sons, p. 90
- Brian Levack: The Devil Within: Exorcism and Possession in the Christian West: New Haven: Yale University Press: 2013: ISBN 0300114729
- Brown, Judith C. (1984). "Lesbian Sexuality in Renaissance Italy: The Case of Sister Benedetta Carlini". Signs. 9 (4): 751–758. doi:10.1086/494108. ISSN 0097-9740. JSTOR 3173632. S2CID 144189609.
- Brown, Judith C. (1986). Immodest acts : the life of a lesbian nun in Renaissance Italy. New York: Oxford University Press. ISBN 0-19-503675-1.
- E. Ann Matter: "Discourses of Desire: Sexuality and Christian Women's Visionary Narratives" in Journal of Homosexuality: 18/89(1989–1990): 119 - 132
- Randall, Frederika (19 January 1986). "Divine Visions, Diabolical Obsessions". The New York Times. Archived from the original on 19 May 2009.
- Rosemary Rowe: Benedetta Carlini: Lesbian Nun of Renaissance Italy. Independently published (English & Italian): 2019: ISBN 9781692360894
- Ransom, Holly. "Carlini, Benedetta 1590–1661". Encyclopedia of Sex and Gender: Culture Society History.
- Rothman, David J.; Marcus, Steven; Kiceluk, Stephanie A. (1995). "Clerical Investigation into the Case of Benedetta Carliny (1619-1623)". Medicine and Western Civilization. Rutgers University Press. pp. 33–42. ISBN 9780813521909.
- Schutte, Anne Jacobson (1999). "Little Women, Great Heroines: Simulated and Genuine Female Holiness in Early Modern Italy". In Scaraffia, Lucetta; Zarri, Gabriella (eds.). Women and Faith: Catholic Religious Life in Italy from Late Antiquity to the Present. Translated by Botsford, Keith. Harvard University Press. pp. 144–158. ISBN 0674954785.
- Simons, Patricia (2019). ""Bodily Things" and Brides of Christ. The case os early seventeenth-century "lesbian nun" Benedetta Carlini". In Murray, Jacqueline; Terpstra, Nicholas (eds.). Sex, Gender and Sexuality in Renaissance Italy. Taylor & Francis. ISBN 9781351008709.
- Vanda (playwright): 'Vile Affections: Based on the True Story of Benedetta Carlini', 2006: (First produced at the New York International Fringe Festival, August, 2006. Recently translated into German.) see www.vandaplaywright.com
