= Ferrazzi =

Ferrazzi is an Italian surname. Notable people with the surname include:

- Bill Ferrazzi (1907–1993), American baseball player
- Cecilia Ferrazzi (1609–1684), Counter-Reformation Catholic mystic
- Ferruccio Ferrazzi (1891–1978), Italian painter and sculptor
- Keith Ferrazzi, American writer
- Pierpaolo Ferrazzi (born 1965), Italian slalom canoeist

== See also ==
- Ferrazza
