= Paul Verhoeven =

Dutch filmmaker (born 1938)

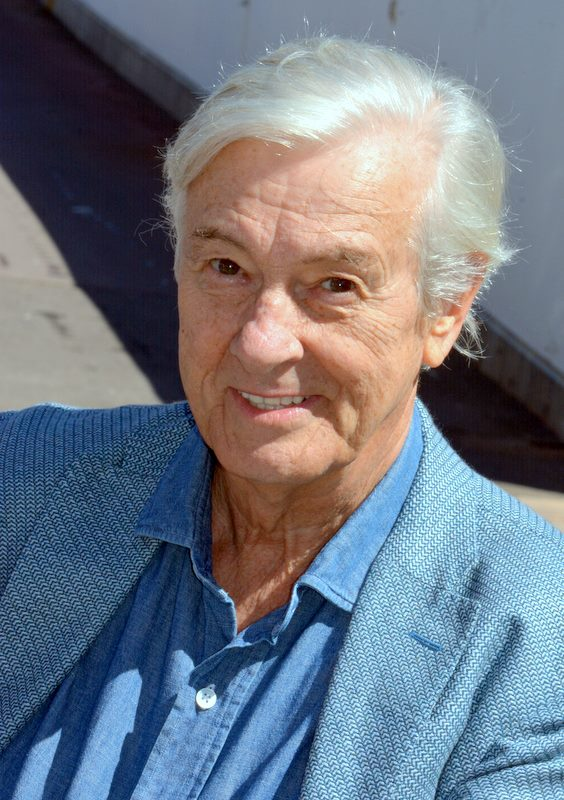
- Verhoeven in 2016
- Born: 18 July 1938 (age 88); Amsterdam, Netherlands
- Education: Gymnasium Haganum
- Alma mater: Leiden University
- Occupations: Director; screenwriter; producer
- Years active: 1959–present
- Known for: Turkish Delight; Soldier of Orange; Spetters; RoboCop; Total Recall; Basic Instinct; Showgirls; Starship Troopers; Elle
- Spouse: Martine Tours (m. 1967)
- Children: 2
- Awards: See below

Paul Verhoeven (Dutch: [ˈpʌul vərˈɦuvə(n)]; born 18 July 1938) is a Dutch filmmaker, who has worked variously in the Netherlands, the United States, and in France. He is known for directing genre films with strong satirical elements, often featuring graphic violence and explicit sexual content and nudity. Many of his films are considered provocative, and were controversial when released.

After receiving attention for the TV series Floris in his native Netherlands, Verhoeven's breakthrough film was the romantic drama Turkish Delight (1973), starring frequent collaborator Rutger Hauer, which received an Oscar nomination for Best Foreign-Language Film. He later directed successful Dutch films including the period film Keetje Tippel (1975), the World War II film Soldier of Orange (1977), the adolescent drama Spetters (1980) and the Gerard Reve-adapted psychological thriller The Fourth Man (1983).

In 1985, Verhoeven made his first Hollywood film Flesh and Blood and later had a successful career in the United States, directing science fiction films such as RoboCop (1987), Total Recall (1990), Starship Troopers (1997) and Hollow Man (2000), as well as the erotic thriller Basic Instinct (1992). He also directed the 1995 film Showgirls, which was critically panned on initial release but has developed a cult following and undergone critical re-evaluation.

Verhoeven later returned to Europe, making the Dutch war film Black Book (2006), the French psychological thriller Elle (2016) and the religious drama Benedetta (2021), all receiving positive reviews. Black Book and Elle were both nominated for BAFTA Award for Best Film Not in the English Language and Elle won Golden Globe Award for Best Foreign Language Film and César Award for Best Film. Black Book was also voted by the Dutch public, in 2008, as the best Dutch film ever made. Verhoeven's films have received a total of nine Academy Award nominations, mainly for editing and effects.

== Early life ==
Paul Verhoeven was born in Amsterdam on 18 July 1938, the son of a schoolteacher, Wim Verhoeven, and a hatmaker, Nel van Schaardenburg. Despite what is sometimes reported, he is not related to German filmmaker Michael Verhoeven, whose father was also named Paul Verhoeven.

In 1943, the family moved to The Hague, the location of the German headquarters in the Netherlands during World War II. The Verhoeven house was near a German military base with V1- and V2-rocket launchers, which was repeatedly bombed by Allied forces. Their neighbours' house was hit and Verhoeven's parents were almost killed when bombs fell on a street crossing. From this period, Verhoeven mentioned in interviews, he remembers images of violence, burning houses, dead bodies on the street, and continuous danger. As a small child, he experienced the war as an exciting adventure, and has compared himself with the character Bill Rowan in Hope and Glory (1987).

Verhoeven's father became headteacher at the Van Heutszschool in The Hague, and Paul attended this school. Sometimes the two watched informative films at home with the school's film projector.

Verhoeven and his father went to see The War of the Worlds (1953) ten times. Verhoeven was a fan of the Dutch comic Dick Bos, a private detective who fights crime using jujutsu. Verhoeven liked comic drawing; he created The Killer, a character in a detailed story of revenge. Other fiction he liked included Frankenstein and the Edgar Rice Burroughs Barsoom series.

Verhoeven attended public secondary school Gymnasium Haganum in The Hague. Later, beginning in 1956, he studied at Leiden University. He graduated in 1964 with a doctorandus (MSc) in mathematics as a major and physics as a minor.

== Career ==
=== Short films and TV series (1960–1969) ===
Verhoeven made his first film Één hagedis teveel (One Lizard Too Many) for the anniversary of his students' corps in 1960. In his last years at university, Verhoeven also attended classes at the Netherlands Film Academy. After this, he made three more short films: Nothing Special (1961), The Hitchhikers (1962) and Let's Have a Party (1963).

Verhoeven has not professionally used his mathematics and physics degree, opting instead to invest his energies in a career in film. After his studies, he entered the Royal Dutch Navy as a conscript. He made the documentary Het Korps Mariniers (The Marine Corps, 1965), which won the French 'Golden Sun' award for military films.

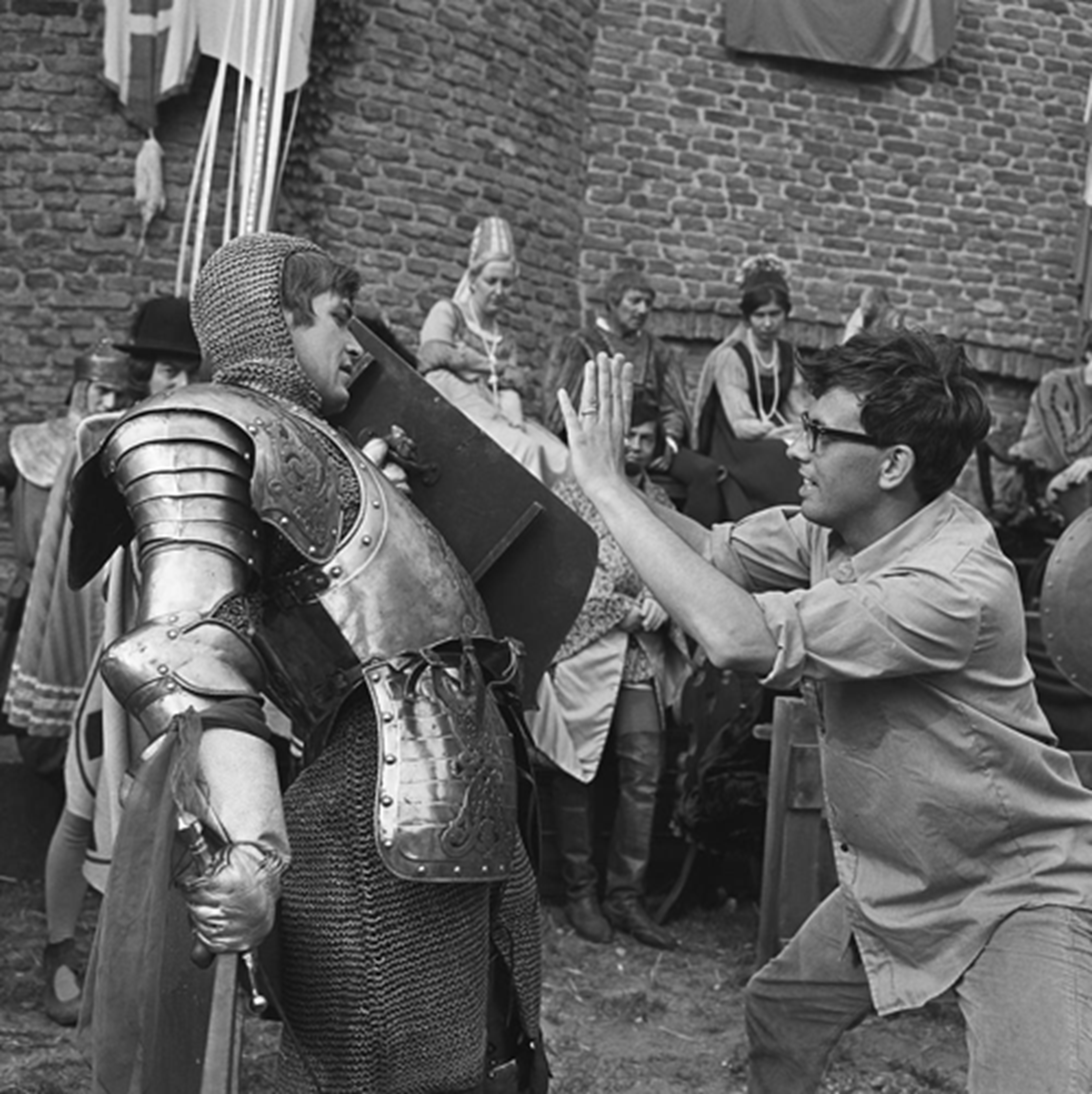
Verhoeven on the set of Floris (1968)

When he left the Navy, Verhoeven took his skills into Dutch television. First, he made a documentary about Anton Mussert titled Mussert (1968). His first major success was the 1969 television series Floris, starring Rutger Hauer in the title role. The concept of Floris was inspired by foreign series such as Ivanhoe and Thierry La Fronde.

=== First feature films (1969–1983) ===
Verhoeven's first feature film Business Is Business was released in 1971 and was not well received. His first national success came in 1973 with Turkish Delight, starring Rutger Hauer and Monique van de Ven. Based on a novel by bestselling Dutch author Jan Wolkers, Turkish Delight tells the passionate love story of an artist and a young liberal girl from a conservative background. It received an Academy Award nomination for Best Foreign Language Film in 1974. In 1999, the film won a Golden Calf for Best Dutch Film of the Century. Katie Tippel (1975) again featured Hauer and van de Ven, but it did not match the success of Turkish Delight.

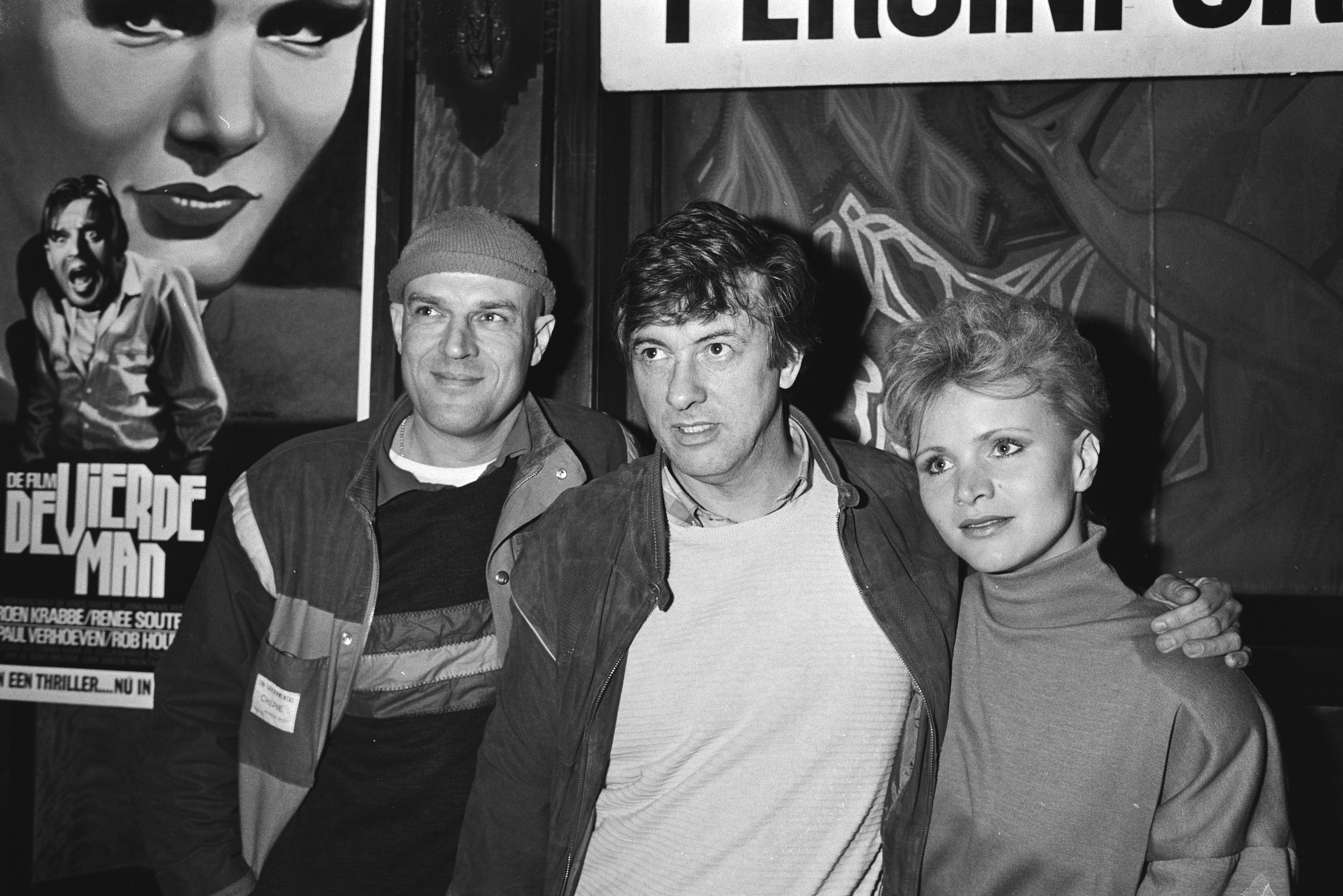
Verhoeven (center) in 1983

Verhoeven built on his reputation and achieved international success with the Golden Globe-nominated Soldier of Orange (1977), starring Rutger Hauer and Jeroen Krabbé. Based on a true story about the Dutch resistance in World War II, it was written by Erik Hazelhoff Roelfzema. Soldier of Orange received the 1979 LA Film Critics Award for best foreign-language film, and it was also nominated for a Golden Globe in 1980.

In 1980, Verhoeven made Spetters with Renée Soutendijk and Rutger Hauer. The story is sometimes compared to Saturday Night Fever, but it has more explicit violence and sexuality (in this case also homosexuality), which are sometimes seen as the director's trademarks. The Fourth Man (1983) is a horror film starring Jeroen Krabbé and Renée Soutendijk. It was written by Gerard Soeteman from a novel by the Dutch writer Gerard Reve, and was Verhoeven's last Dutch production until Black Book (2006). The Seattle Times praised Verhoeven by saying he "often appears to be a one-man Dutch movie industry". The San Diego Union-Tribune called Verhoeven "a busy bee whose movies pollinate the festival circuit".

=== Filmmaking in the United States (1983–2000) ===
Gerard Soeteman also wrote the script for Verhoeven's first English-language film, Flesh and Blood (1985), which starred Rutger Hauer and Jennifer Jason Leigh. Verhoeven moved to Hollywood for a wider range of opportunities in filmmaking. Working in the U.S., he made a serious change in style, directing big-budget, violent, special-effects-heavy hits RoboCop (1987) and Total Recall (1990) — each of which won an Academy Special Achievement Award: RoboCop for Sound Effects Editing and Total Recall for Visual Effects.

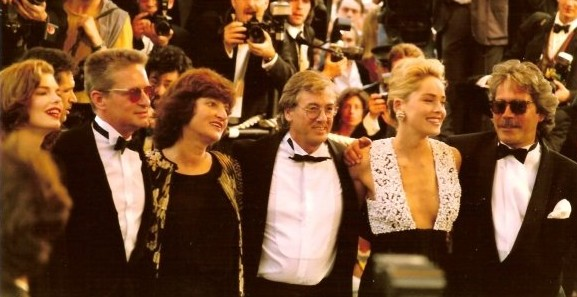
Presentation of Basic Instinct at the 1992 Cannes Film Festival. Left to right: Jeanne Tripplehorn, Michael Douglas, Martine Tours (Verhoeven's wife), Verhoeven, Sharon Stone and Mario Kassar.

Verhoeven followed those successes with Basic Instinct (1992), an erotic thriller. The film's most notorious scene shows Sharon Stone's character in a police interrogation, where she uncrosses her legs, briefly revealing her vulva (she does not wear underwear underneath her skirt). The film received two Academy Award nominations, for Film Editing and for Original Music, and was the ninth-highest-grossing film of the year.

During this time, Verhoeven also worked on creating an historical epic based around the Crusades that would have starred Arnold Schwarzenegger. It went into pre-production in 1993, but a year later the studio backing it, Carolco, pulled funding for the project. Verhoeven would continue to discuss it throughout the 1990s.

Verhoeven's next film was the poorly received, NC-17-rated Showgirls (1995), about a stripper in Las Vegas trying to make a career as a showgirl. It won seven Golden Raspberry Awards, including Worst Film and Worst Director; Verhoeven became the first director to accept his award in person. To date, he is one of the few people to have accepted their Golden Raspberry awards in person, and the first to directly attend the ceremony to receive it. Showgirls enjoyed a large amount of success on the home video market, generating more than $100 million from video rentals, and became one of MGM's top twenty all-time bestsellers.

After Basic Instinct and Showgirls, Verhoeven returned to the science fiction genre, utilizing the graphic violence and special-effects tropes that had marked his earlier films, making Starship Troopers (1997), loosely based on the novel of the same name by Robert A. Heinlein, as well as Hollow Man (2000). Each film received an Academy Award nomination for Best Visual Effects. He also served as an executive producer on an animated TV series called Roughnecks: Starship Troopers Chronicles, which was based on the movie and novel of Starship Troopers. The series only ran for a single season, from August 1999 until April 2000.

=== Return to Europe (2006–2021) ===
After about twenty years of working and living in the United States, Verhoeven returned to the Netherlands for the shooting of a new film. Together with his screenwriter Gerard Soeteman, Verhoeven made Black Book (2006). The director was hailed by the host of the Netherlands Film Festival with the words "The return of a hero". Black Book won six Golden Calves at this festival, including Best Director. When the shooting of Black Book was delayed due to financial issues, there was speculation about a new production. Beast of Bataan had been announced, but once the shooting for Black Book resumed, the other film was not made.

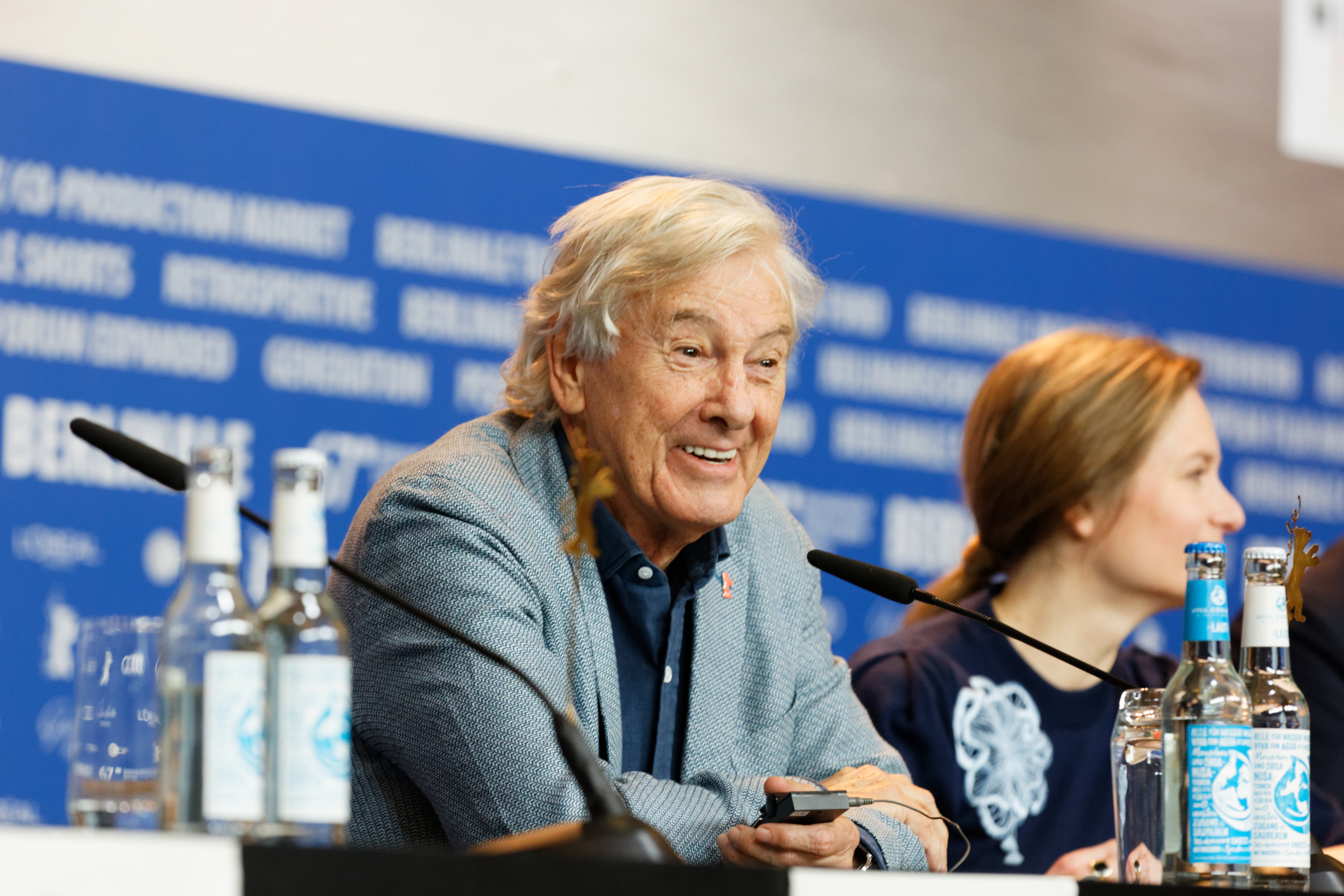
Verhoeven at press conference at Berlinale 2017

Verhoeven was knighted in the Order of the Netherlands Lion in 2007.

Since Black Book, Verhoeven has been connected to a large number of projects, but in the first decade after his return, none came to fruition. Some of those titles were produced with other directors at the helm, such as The Paperboy. In 2016, however, Verhoeven followed Black Book by directing a French film: Elle, an adaptation of a novel by Philippe Djian. A psychological thriller in which Isabelle Huppert plays a rape victim, Elle was selected for the Official Competition at the Cannes International Film Festival, where it obtained very favourable reviews.

In December 2016, it was announced that Verhoeven would be the president of the jury for the 67th Berlin International Film Festival, scheduled to take place in February 2017.

In April 2017, it was announced that filming of Benedetta, his next French film, would begin in August of the same year. It is a biopic about the life of Benedetta Carlini, portrayed by Elle co-star Virginie Efira, and is an adaptation of the non-fiction book Immodest Acts: The Life of a Lesbian Nun in Renaissance Italy by Judith C. Brown. In May 2018, it was announced that Charlotte Rampling would play a key supporting role. The film premiered at the 2021 Cannes Film Festival in competition for the Palme d'Or.

=== Return to filmmaking in the United States (2022–present) ===
Verhoeven is currently preparing his next film, Young Sinner, which reunites him with RoboCop screenwriter Edward Neumeier. An erotic political thriller, it is set in Washington DC and is about a "young staffer who works for a powerful Senator [and] is drawn into a web of international intrigue and danger". Verhoeven hoped to begin shooting Young Sinner in 2024.

== Other activities ==
Verhoeven was a member of the Jesus Seminar, and he was the only member who does not have a degree in biblical studies. He graduated with a degree in mathematics and physics from the University of Leiden. Since he is not a professional biblical exegete, his membership in the Jesus Seminar has occasionally been cited by opponents of the Seminar as a sign that this group is less scholarly than it claims. For example, Luke Timothy Johnson criticizes the Jesus Seminar's methods on exegetical grounds, and also criticizes what he perceives to be a dependence on the theatrical and an attempt to manipulate the mainstream media. He singles out Verhoeven as a key player in the media activities of the Jesus Seminar. On the other hand, some Jesus Seminar members were unhappy with Verhoeven's portrayal of Jesus as an eschatological prophet.

In 2007, Verhoeven wrote the book Jesus of Nazareth (Dutch: Jezus van Nazareth) about the life of Jesus of Nazareth. The book reviews the ideas of Jesus of Nazareth and the alleged corruption of these same ideas over the last 2,000 years. Co-written with Verhoeven's biographer Rob Van Scheers, the book is the culmination of the research Verhoeven conducted in preparation for Jesus: The Man, a potential motion picture about the life of Christ. The book tells about the Jewish uprising against Roman rule and characterizes Jesus as a radical political activist, downplaying any supernatural events and miracles as unproved or unprovable. Jesus of Nazareth: A Realistic Portrait was released in September 2008 in Dutch, and was published in English in May 2010 by Seven Stories Press.

== Personal life ==
In 1967, Verhoeven married Martine Tours, with whom he has two daughters.

== Filmography ==
=== Feature film ===
Year	Title	Director	Writer
1971	Business Is Business	Yes	No
1973	Turkish Delight	Yes	No
1975	Katie Tippel	Yes	No
1977	Soldier of Orange	Yes	Yes
1980	Spetters	Yes	No
1983	The Fourth Man	Yes	No
1985	Flesh and Blood	Yes	Yes
1987	RoboCop	Yes	No
1990	Total Recall	Yes	No
1992	Basic Instinct	Yes	No
1995	Showgirls	Yes	No
1997	Starship Troopers	Yes	No
2000	Hollow Man	Yes	No
2006	Black Book	Yes	Yes
2016	Elle	Yes	No
2021	Benedetta	Yes	Yes

Executive producer

- Hollow Man 2 (2006)

=== Short film ===
Year	Title	Director	Writer	Notes
1959	Cups of Coffee	Yes	No	
1960	One Lizard Too Many	Yes	No	
1961	Nothing Special	Yes	No	
1962	The Hitchhikers	Yes	No	
1963	Let's Have a Party	Yes	No	
1965	The Marine Corps	Yes	No	Documentary short
1971	The Wrestler	Yes	No	
2012	Tricked	Yes	Yes	Segment of Entertainment Experience

=== Television ===
Director

Year	Title	Notes
1969	Floris	12 episodes
1970	Portret van Anton Adriaan Mussert	Documentary series
1981	All Things Pass	TV movie
1986	The Hitchhiker	Episode "Last Scene"

Executive producer

Year	Title	Note
1999–2000	Roughnecks: Starship Troopers Chronicles	39 episodes

== Awards and nominations ==
Award	Year	Category	Nominated work	Result
Academy Awards	1973	Best Foreign Language Film	Turkish Delight	Nominated
British Academy Film Awards	2006	Best Film Not in the English Language	Black Book	Nominated
British Academy Film Awards	2016	Best Film Not in the English Language	Elle	Nominated
Cahiers du Cinéma	2016	Annual Top 10 Lists	Elle	2nd place
Cahiers du Cinéma	2021	Annual Top 10 Lists	Benedetta	10th place
CEC Awards	2017	Best Foreign Film	Elle	Nominated
César Awards	2016	Best Film	Elle	Won
César Awards	2016	Best Director	Elle	Nominated
David di Donatello	2018	Best European Film	Elle	Nominated
Daytime Emmy Awards	2001	Outstanding Special Class Animated Program	Roughnecks: Starship Troopers Chronicles	Nominated
Emmy Awards	2013	Digital Program Non Fiction category	Entertainment Experience	Won
European Film Awards	2007	Best European Film	Black Book	Nominated
European Film Awards	2016	Best European Film	Elle	Nominated
European Film Awards	2016	Best European Director	Elle	Nominated
Fotogramas de Plata	2017	Best Foreign Film	Elle	Won
French Syndicate of Cinema Critics	2017	Best Film	Elle	Won
Gaudí Awards	2017	Best European Film	Elle	Won
Golden Globe Awards	1977	Best Foreign Language Film	Soldier of Orange	Nominated
Golden Globe Awards	2016	Best Foreign Language Film	Elle	Won
Golden Raspberry Awards	1995	Worst Director	Showgirls	Won
Goya Awards	2017	Best European Film	Elle	Won
Grande Prêmio do Cinema Brasileiro	2017	Best Foreign-Language Film	Elle	Nominated
Hugo Award	1988	Best Dramatic Presentation	RoboCop	Nominated
Hugo Award	1991	Best Dramatic Presentation	Total Recall	Nominated
Hugo Award	1998	Best Dramatic Presentation	Starship Troopers	Nominated
Lumière Awards	2017	Best Film	Elle	Won
Lumière Awards	2017	Best Director	Elle	Won
Los Angeles Film Critics Association	1979	Best Foreign Language Film	Soldier of Orange	Won
Los Angeles Film Critics Association	1984	Best Foreign Language Film	The Fourth Man	Won
Rembrandt Awards	2007	Best Film	Black Book	Won
San Diego Film Critics Society	2007	Best Original Screenplay	Black Book	Nominated
Sant Jordi Awards	2017	Best Foreign Film	Elle	Won
Saturn Awards	1987	Best Director	RoboCop	Won
Saturn Awards	1990	Best Director	Total Recall	Nominated
Saturn Awards	1992	Best Director	Basic Instinct	Nominated
Saturn Awards	1997	Best Director	Starship Troopers	Nominated
Saturn Awards	2007	Saturn Award for Best International Film	Black Book	Nominated

=== Film festivals ===
Festival	Year	Category	Nominated work	Result
BFI London Film Festival	2016	Official Competition	Elle	Nominated
Cannes Film Festival	1992	Palme d'Or	Basic Instinct	Nominated
Cannes Film Festival	2016	Palme d'Or	Elle	Nominated
Cannes Film Festival	2021	Palme d'Or	Benedetta	Nominated
Cannes Film Festival	2021	Queer Palm	Benedetta	Nominated
Capri Hollywood International Film Festival	2007	Capri Cult Award	—N/a	Won
Cartagena Film Festival	2017	Best Film	Elle	Nominated
Chicago International Film Festival	1983	Gold Hugo	The Fourth Man	Nominated
Fantasporto	1986	Best Film	Flesh and Blood	Nominated
Film by the Sea	2011	Grand Director Award	—N/a	Won
Imagine Film Festival	2002	Lifetime Achievement Award	—N/a	Won
Locarno Film Festival	1964	Prize of the Ecumenical Jury	Feest!	Won
Locarno Film Festival	2000	Audience Award	Hollow Man	Won
Locarno Film Festival	2000	Leopard of Honor	—N/a	Won
Melbourne International Film Festival	2016	People's Choice Award	Elle	Nominated
Netherlands Film Festival	1985	Best Director of a Feature Film	Flesh and Blood	Won
Netherlands Film Festival	1992	Dutch Culture Award	—N/a	Won
Netherlands Film Festival	1999	Dutch Film of the Century	Turkish Delight	Won
Netherlands Film Festival	2000	Grolsch Film Award	—N/a	Won
Netherlands Film Festival	2006	Best Director of a Feature Film	Black Book	Won
Palm Springs International Film Festival	2017	Best Foreign Language Film	Elle	Nominated
San Sebastián International Film Festival	2016	Audience Award	Elle	Nominated
San Sebastián International Film Festival	2021	RTVE-Otra Mirada Award	Benedetta	Nominated
San Sebastián International Film Festival	2021	Best Film	Benedetta	Nominated
Sitges Film Festival	1987	Best Film	RoboCop	Nominated
Sitges Film Festival	1987	Best Director	RoboCop	Won
Sitges Film Festival	2006	Honorary Grand Prize	—N/a	Won
Toronto International Film Festival	1983	International Critics' Prize	The Fourth Man	Won
Trieste Film Festival	2018	Best Film	Elle	Won
Venice Film Festival	2006	Golden Lion	Black Book	Nominated
Venice Film Festival	2006	Young Cinema Award	Black Book	Won

List of awards and nominations received by Verhoeven's films
Year	Title	Academy Awards		BAFTA Awards		Golden Globe Awards		César Awards	
Year	Title	Nominations	Wins	Nominations	Wins	Nominations	Wins	Nominations	Wins
1973	Turkish Delight	1							
1977	Soldier of Orange					1		1	
1987	RoboCop	3	1	2					
1990	Total Recall	3	1						
1992	Basic Instinct	2				2			
1997	Starship Troopers	1							
2000	Hollow Man	1							
2006	Black Book			1					
2016	Elle	1		1		2	2	11	2
2021	Benedetta							1	
Total		12	2	5		5	2	13	2
