= Benedetta (film) =

2021 film by Paul Verhoeven

- Theatrical release poster
- Directed by: Paul Verhoeven
- Screenplay by: David Birke; Paul Verhoeven
- Based on: Immodest Acts: The Life of a Lesbian Nun in Renaissance Italy by Judith C. Brown
- Produced by: Saïd Ben Saïd; Michel Merkt; Jérôme Seydoux
- Starring: Virginie Efira; Charlotte Rampling; Daphné Patakia; Lambert Wilson; Olivier Rabourdin; Louise Chevillotte; Hervé Pierre; Clotilde Courau
- Cinematography: Jeanne Lapoirie
- Edited by: Job ter Burg
- Music by: Anne Dudley
- Production companies: SBS Productions; Pathé; France 2 Cinéma; France 3 Cinéma; Topkapi Films; Belga Productions
- Distributed by: Pathé (France); Independent Films (Netherlands); Belga Films (Belgium)
- Release dates: 9 July 2021 (Cannes); 9 July 2021 (France); 8 September 2021 (Belgium); 14 October 2021 (Netherlands)
- Running time: 132 minutes
- Countries: France; Netherlands; Belgium
- Language: French
- Budget: €19.8 million; (est. $21.3 million)
- Box office: $4.3 million

Benedetta is a 2021 biographical psychological drama film co-written and directed by Paul Verhoeven, starring Virginie Efira as Benedetta Carlini, a nun in the 17th century who joins an Italian convent while a young child and later has a lesbian love affair with another nun, while seeing religious visions.

The film is loosely based on the 1985 non-fiction book Immodest Acts: The Life of a Lesbian Nun in Renaissance Italy by Judith C. Brown. Its production included most of the key crew members from Verhoeven's previous film Elle (which also co-starred Efira), such as producer Saïd Ben Saïd, writer David Birke, composer Anne Dudley and editor Job ter Burg.

The film premiered in competition for the Palme d'Or at the 74th Cannes Film Festival on 9 July 2021.

== Plot ==
In 17th-century Pescia, Italy, young Benedetta Carlini is enrolled by her parents in a Theatine convent run by Abbess Felicita, to become a nun. Eighteen years later, while playing the Virgin Mary in a play, Benedetta has a vision of Jesus calling to her. One day, a young peasant woman named Bartolomea seeks shelter in the convent from her abusive father. Benedetta is assigned to oversee Bartolomea's integration into convent life. That night, Bartolomea kisses Benedetta.

Benedetta begins to have recurring visions of Jesus. After a particularly fraught vision, where a man whom she mistakes for Jesus saves her from being gang-raped, Benedetta falls into a deep illness. Felicita assigns Bartolomea to look after her. Benedetta has another vision of Christ, asking her to undress and touch his hands. The next morning, she wakes up with stigmata on her palms and feet.

An investigation ensues. Felicita is skeptical because Benedetta's stigmata manifested while she was asleep, not during prayer, and her forehead lacks the marks of a crown of thorns. Outside Felicita's chambers, Benedetta collapses. She then begins speaking in an angry male voice, castigating those who doubt her, as bleeding wounds appear on her forehead. Sister Christina, Felicita's daughter, suspects that Benedetta's wounds are self-inflicted, after spotting a nearby shard of glass.

Following a dispute between Felicita and local church leaders about the way popular interest in Benedetta's visions should be handled, Benedetta is elevated to the position of abbess in place of Felicita. Benedetta and Bartolomea move into Felicita's old quarters and begin a sexual relationship, later using a dildo carved by Bartolomea out of Benedetta's wooden Virgin Mary statuette.

In confession, Christina lies to the priest that she witnessed Benedetta inflicting her forehead wounds. The next day, the priest compels Christina to say her accusations publicly. When questioned by the priest, Felicita refutes Christina's claims because Christina has previously admitted to her that she did not actually see the wounds being self-inflicted. Benedetta, apparently possessed by the spirit of Jesus, orders Christina to flagellate herself. Felicita later observes Benedetta and Bartolomea having sex in their chambers through a peephole.

Humiliated, Christina jumps to her death from the roof of the convent. As a plague begins to ravage the countryside, Benedetta has a vision that Pescia will be spared and orders the abbey closed to prevent infection. Felicita secretly travels to Florence to report Benedetta's sexual indiscretions to the local papal nuncio. Meanwhile, Benedetta suddenly dies of unknown causes.

Shortly after Felicita returns to the abbey with the nuncio, Benedetta revives, saying that she was in heaven and has seen the fates of all those present. The nuncio, as representative of the pope, opens a court of inquiry into Benedetta's conduct. Bartolomea initially denies any sexual involvement with Benedetta, but after being tortured by the nuncio's men, she ultimately confesses the truth, leading the nuncio to the wooden dildo hidden in a cutout section of a large book. He has Benedetta arrested; speaking in a male voice again, she lashes out at those who persecute her, announcing that the nuncio will soon fall ill. The nuncio discovers that Felicita has the plague and orders her condition to be hidden. Bartolomea is expelled from the abbey.

In the town square, before she is to be executed, Benedetta reveals new stigmata and, speaking in a male voice, announces that the Angel of Death approaches. Felicita, revealing her disease, blames the nuncio for bringing the plague to Pescia. Chaos ensues as the townspeople prevent the nuncio's men from burning Benedetta at the stake. Bartolomea unties Benedetta, discovering a bloody potsherd at her feet. The nuncio is killed by an angry mob, Benedetta and Bartolomea flee the town, and Felicita self-immolates on the fire lit for Benedetta's execution.

In an abandoned stable outside of town, after spending the night with Bartolomea, Benedetta insists that she must return to the convent. Bartolomea begs her to stay and tries to get her to admit that she faked her stigmata, but Benedetta refuses and instead heads back towards Pescia.

An epilogue reveals that Benedetta lived in the abbey until her death at the age of 70, and that the plague spared Pescia.

== Cast ==
- Virginie Efira as Benedetta Carlini
- Charlotte Rampling as Abbess Felicita
- Daphné Patakia as Bartolomea
- Lambert Wilson as the nuncio
- Olivier Rabourdin as Alfonso Cecchi
- Louise Chevillotte as Sister Christina
- Hervé Pierre as Paolo Ricordati
- Guilaine Londez as Sister Jacopa
- David Clavel as Giuliano Carlini, Benedetta's father
- Clotilde Courau as Midea Carlini, Benedetta's mother
- Lauriane Riquet as Sister Rosanna
- Nicolas Gaspar as the mercenary captain

== Production ==
=== Development ===
Following the critical and commercial success of his previous film Elle (2016), director Paul Verhoeven developed several projects including one about Jesus based on his own book Jesus of Nazareth, another about the French Resistance during World War II, and a medieval story set in a monastery scripted by Jean-Claude Carrière. On 25 April 2017, producer Saïd Ben Saïd revealed that the third had been the one chosen as Verhoeven's next project. The film, then titled Blessed Virgin, marked the producer and the director's second collaboration after Elle. Gerard Soeteman, who has worked with Verhoeven on eight previous films including Turkish Delight (1973), The Fourth Man (1983) and Black Book (2006), replaced Carrière to adapt the 1985 non-fiction book Immodest Acts: The Life of a Lesbian Nun in Renaissance Italy by historian Judith C. Brown. Soeteman ultimately distanced himself from the project and had his name removed from the credits as he felt too much of the story was focused on sexuality.

Belgian actress Virginie Efira, who played a supporting part as a devout Catholic in Elle, was cast in the leading role of Benedetta Carlini, a 17th-century nun who suffers from disturbing religious and erotic visions. On 25 March 2018, Saïd Ben Saïd announced that Verhoeven had co-written the final draft with David Birke, who previously wrote Elle. Brown stated that "Paul Verhoeven and David Birke have written an imaginative and spellbinding script that explores the intersection of religion, sexuality, and human ambition in an age of plague and faith." Verhoeven then clarified his intentions:

Blessed Virgin must be deeply infused with a sense of the sacred. I have been interested in the sacred ever since I was a child, both generally and more specifically in music, painting.

On 3 April 2018, Lambert Wilson told French newspaper Le Journal du Dimanche that he has a role in the film. On 1 May 2018, Deadline Hollywood revealed that Charlotte Rampling entered negotiations to play a key supporting role. On 4 May 2018, it was announced that the film was retitled to Benedetta. Although Verhoeven had hoped to convince Isabelle Huppert to play a supporting role in the film, producer Saïd Ben Saïd stated on 31 May 2018 that the actress was not joining the project. Ben Saïd also confirmed that Louise Chevillotte, Olivier Rabourdin, Clotilde Courau and Hervé Pierre had been cast in the film.

=== Filming ===
Principal photography on the retitled production began on 19 July 2018 in Montepulciano, Italy. Other locations included Val d'Orcia and Bevagna, also in Italy, as well as the Silvacane Abbey and Le Thoronet Abbey, in France. Production was followed by a strong campaign of secrecy and no one, unless working on the film, was allowed on the set. Producer Saïd Ben Saïd admitted that the story was "subject to controversy" and feared reactions from fundamentalist Catholic associations.

== Historical accuracy ==
While mostly following the account from Brown's book, Verhoeven explained in an interview that much of the ending was fictional: he added the revolt of the citizens, and the attempt to burn Benedetta at the stake was borrowed from the story of Joan of Arc. In interviews he has also stated that the dildo was required to be "historically accurate", because to be burned at the stake required that an "instrument" was used.

== Release ==
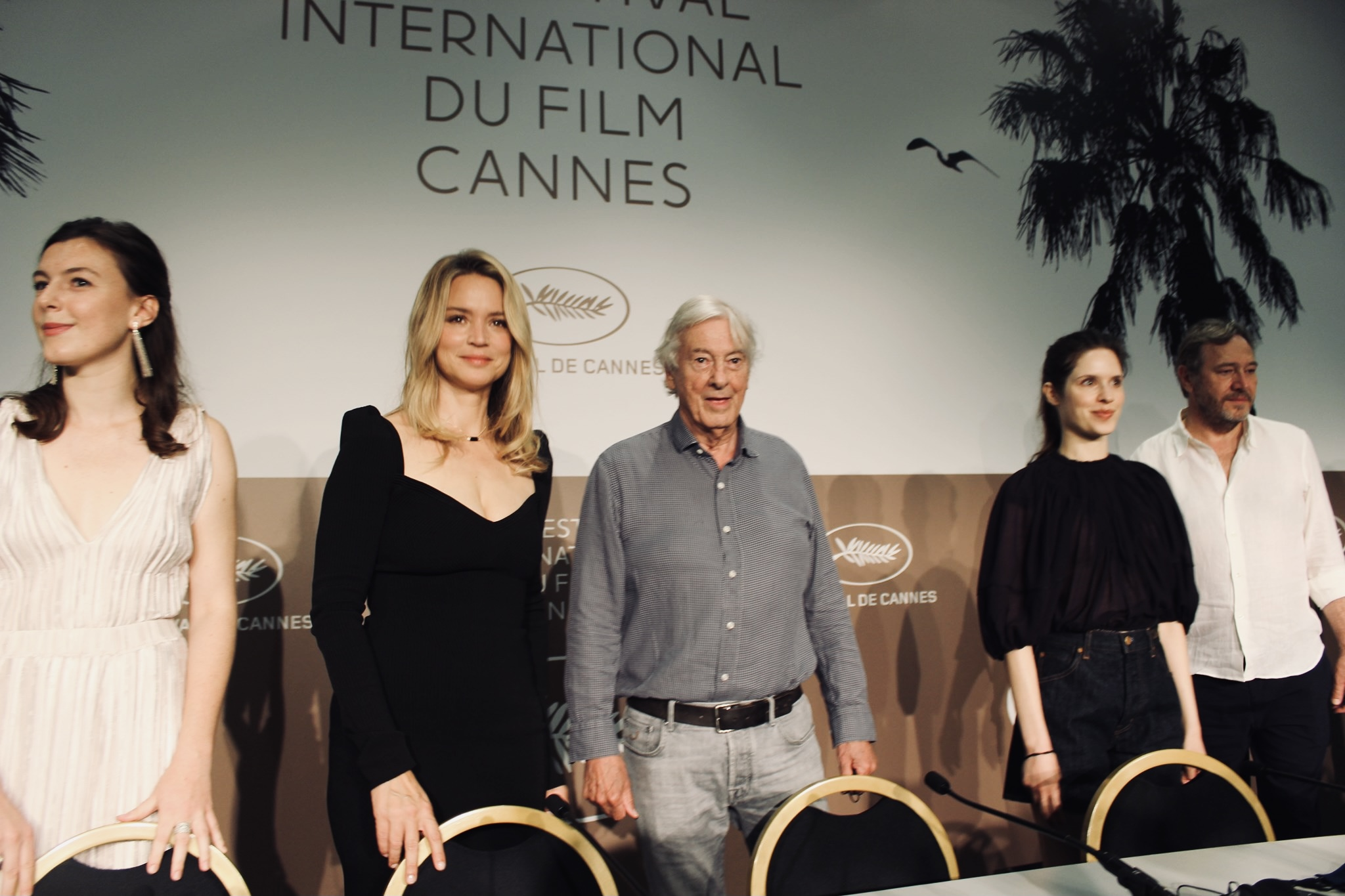
The cast promoting the film at the 2021 Cannes Film Festival

On 16 February 2018, The Hollywood Reporter announced Pathé would be producing and distributing the film in France and would also be handling international sales. On 29 August 2018, Pathé and SBS Productions released a first-look image of the film.

Although it was initially reported that the film would premiere at the 2019 Cannes Film Festival, Pathé announced on 14 January 2019 that the release had been postponed until 2020, stating that post-production had been delayed as Verhoeven was recovering from hip surgery. However, the release was delayed again to 2021, following the cancellation of the 2020 edition of the Cannes Film Festival where the film was set to premiere, due to the COVID-19 pandemic.

On 10 May 2020, Cannes director Thierry Fremaux confirmed the film's selection and stated that "Paul Verhoeven delivers an erotic and mischievous, also political, vision of the Middle Ages in a grandiose production."

Benedetta had its world premiere in competition for the Palme d'Or at the 74th Cannes Film Festival on 9 July 2021, with a theatrical release in France on the same day. By the end of its run, it was screened at film festivals in Brussels, Busan, Haifa, Hong Kong, Karlovy Vary, London, New York, and San Sebastian.

In May 2021, Mubi and IFC Films acquired the distribution rights to the film in the United Kingdom, Ireland, and the United States, respectively. It was released theatrically in Belgium on 8 September 2021 by Belga Films and in Netherlands on 14 October 2021 by Independent Films. In the United States, the film was released in select theatres and on-demand on 3 December 2021.

== Reception ==
=== Box office ===
Benedetta grossed $354,481 in North America and $3.9 million in other territories, for a worldwide total of $4.3 million, against a production budget of about $21.3 million. In its opening weekend in France, the film earned $562,420 from 361 theaters. In the United States and Canada, it earned $136,839 from 201 theaters in its opening weekend.

=== Critical response ===
In France, the film averages 3.5/5 on AlloCiné from 36 press reviews. On the review aggregator website Rotten Tomatoes, the film holds an approval rating of 84% based on 201 reviews, with an average rating of 7.2/10. The website's critics consensus reads, "Precariously walking a tightrope of varying genres and tones, Benedetta provokes salient questions about sexual freedom and its relationship to faith." On Metacritic, the film has a weighted average score of 75 out of 100, based on 38 critics, indicating "generally favorable reviews".

=== Protests ===
At the 2021 New York Film Festival, where Benedetta was part of the Main Slate, the Catholic group The American TFP staged a protest targeting the film. The group denounced it as blasphemous for its portrayal of lesbianism within the confines of a convent. Upon the film's US theatrical release, the film was once again protested by The American TFP as well as other Catholic groups throughout the country.

The film was refused classification in Singapore by the Infocomm Media Development Authority (IMDA) due to "portrayal of Jesus Christ and members of the church in a manner that is insensitive and offensive to the Christian and Catholic faith."

The film was banned in Russia by the Ministry of Culture amid a complaint from the public advocacy group Orthodox Forty Forties Movement.

=== Accolades ===
Award	Date of ceremony	Category	Recipient(s)	Result	Ref.
Cannes Film Festival	17 July 2021	Palme d'Or	Paul Verhoeven	Nominated	
Cannes Film Festival	17 July 2021	Queer Palm	Paul Verhoeven	Nominated	
César Awards	25 February 2022	Best Actress	Virginie Efira	Nominated	
Hawaii Film Critics Society	13 January 2022	Best Best Foreign Language Film	Benedetta	Nominated	
Las Vegas Film Critics Society	1 January 2022	Best Foreign Language Film	Benedetta	Nominated	
Lumière Awards	17 January 2022	Best Actress	Virginie Efira	Nominated	
Lumière Awards	17 January 2022	Best Female Revelation	Daphné Patakia	Nominated	
Magritte Awards	12 February 2022	Most Promising Actress	Daphné Patakia	Nominated	
National Board of Review	15 March 2022	Top Five Foreign Language Films	Benedetta	Won	
Women Film Critics Circle	14 December 2021	Best Actress	Virginie Efira	Nominated	
Women Film Critics Circle	14 December 2021	Best Foreign Film by or About Women	Benedetta	Nominated	
