= Maria Domitilla Galluzzi =

Maria Domitilla Galluzzi (1595–1671) was a Catholic mystic, never canonized. According to E. Ann Matter, her foremost chronicler, Galluzzi entered her convent at Pavia, and after some time, began to experience ecstatic visions of Christ's Passion. Amongst other miraculous events, levitation is alleged to have occurred when Galluzzi rose to view a crucifix of Christ's Passion agonies through supernatural means.

Matter notes that Galluzzi's work is based on the spiritual disciplines of Ignatius Loyola, although the seventeenth-century church investigated her for orthodoxy. However, while Galluzzi survived this scrutiny, her mysticism and piety was never recognized through beatification as a Catholic saint, due to Counter-Reformation Catholic rationalist tendencies and sceptical reception of alleged ecstatic visions. It may be instructive to compare her life to her contemporary, Cecilia Ferrazzi (1609–1684), to whom she bears many similarities and differences.

== See also ==
- Cecilia Ferrazzi
