= Ferrazza =

Ferrazza is an Italian surname. Notable people with the surname include:

- Alessio Ferrazza (born 1986), Italian footballer
- Daniele Ferrazza (born 1993), Italian curler

== See also ==
- Ferrazzi
