= Cecilia Ferrazzi =

Cecilia Ferrazzi (1609 – 17 January 1684) was an Italian Counter-Reformation Catholic mystic whose life was extensively involved with the establishment and maintenance of women's houses of refuge in seventeenth century Italy.

== Early life and career ==
Born in Venice to a relatively prosperous artisanal family, daughter to Alvise di Martin Ferrazzi or Ferrazzo and Maddalena Polis, Ferrazzi aspired to become a nun from an early age, and showed a strong aversion to the idea of marriage. Unfortunately, her plans went astray due to the sudden death of her parents and most of her family during a plague epidemic, apart from her younger sister, Maria, who did enter a convent and rose to high clerical rank within her chosen Carmelite order.

As for Cecilia, she was placed under a series of spiritual advisors and confessors, but her independent wealth enabled her to forge a relatively independent life for herself within the constraints of Counter-Reformation religious and social order. In 1648, she became governess to the motherless children of Paolo Lion, a Venetian noble, and used her contacts within high society to open a series of women's houses of refugee for women who wanted to avoid either marriage or prostitution, usually the only vocation available for Counter-Reformation Italian women outside holy orders.

== Inquisition ==
While her clerical associates lauded her piety, her secular charges were not as impressed, and many complained about the alleged lack of adequate housing, constant poverty, abusive punishment and Ferrazzi's own authoritarianism. What concerned the Inquisition more when they responded to these complaints were allegations that Cecilia had performed the offices of a male confessor, something traditionally reserved for male Catholic priests.

The Inquisition duly responded to complaints about Ferrazzi's conduct in 1664. On reaching a verdict in 1665, the presiding ecclesiastical authorities decided that Ferrazzi was engaging in 'feigned sanctity,' impersonating saintly attributes. As her English translator, Anne Jacobson Schutte, noted in the first English translation of her trial account after the release of Inquisition documents, Ferrazzi's error was that she was said to be engaging in 'dissimulation,' and it was widely felt in the post-feudal society of the Counter-Reformation era that this masquerade upset contemporary religious control over what constituted grounds for 'sainthood.' Given her affluent Italian background, Schutte argued that Ferrazzi may have been literate, and tried to shape public perceptions of her own social role, piety and religious vocation through active emulation of near-contemporaries such as Saint Teresa of Avila. In 1665, an Inquisition tribunal ordered that Ferrazzi be imprisoned for seven years. However, she was released in 1667, possibly due to an appeal to the Vatican on her behalf. Ferrazzi may have developed a respiratory ailment during her period of imprisonment, as she died in 1684. Scholars Anne Jacobson Schutte, Cristina Mazzoni, Elizabeth Horodowich, and others have asserted that her story may demonstrate how Counter-Reformation Catholicism tried to control and regulate access to potential sainthood and preserve the constraints of Counter-Reformation gender roles for women and men.

== See also ==
- Maria Domitilla Galluzzi
- Teresa of Avila
- Mary Magdalene de'Pazzi
- Juana Inés de la Cruz
