= Judith C. Brown =

American historian

Judith C. Brown (born 1946) is an American historian and a Professor Emerita of History at Wesleyan University. A specialist on the Italian Renaissance, she is considered a pioneer in the study of the history of sexuality whose work explored the earliest recorded examples of lesbian relationships in European history.

== Academic career ==
Brown holds a B.A. and M.A. from the University of California, Berkeley as well as a Ph.D. from Johns Hopkins University. In addition to her career as a faculty member at UMBC and Stanford, Rice, and Wesleyan universities, she has been Dean of the School of Humanities at Rice and Vice-President for Academic Affairs and Provost at Wesleyan. She was also the former Dean of the College of Arts and Humanities at Minerva University in San Francisco.

Currently, Brown is an Emeritus Professor of History at Wesleyan University.

== Achievements ==
Brown has received numerous fellowships and awards, including fellowships at the Center for Advanced Study in the Behavioral Sciences, the Stanford Humanities Center, I Tatti (the Harvard Center for Italian Renaissance Studies), as well as grants and fellowships from the Guggenheim Foundation, the Pew Foundation, the American Council of Learned Societies, and others.

Her 1986 book Immodest Acts: The Life of a Lesbian Nun in Renaissance Italy was adapted for the screen in 2021 as Benedetta by director Paul Verhoeven.

== Scholarly interests ==
A feminist historian of early modern Europe and Renaissance Italy, Brown’s scholarly interests include issues in higher education and the history of women, gender and sexuality.

== Works ==
=== Books ===
- Brown, Judith C.; Davis, eds. (1998). Gender and Society in Renaissance Italy (1st ed.). London, England, UK: Longman. ISBN 0582293251. LCCN 97042981.
- Brown, Judith C. (1982). In the Shadow of Florence: Provincial Society in Renaissance Pescia (1st ed.). New York: Oxford University Press. ISBN 0195029933. LCCN 81038377.
- Brown, Judith C. (1986). Immodest Acts: The Life of a Lesbian Nun in Renaissance Italy (1st ed.). New York: Oxford University Press. ISBN 0195036751. LCCN 85005031.
- Brown, Judith C.; Benadusi, Giovanna, eds. (2015). Medici Women: The Making of a Dynasty in Grand Ducal Tuscany (1st ed.). Toronto, Canada: Centre for Reformation and Renaissance Studies. ISBN 978-0772721808. LCCN 2015460330.

=== Articles ===
- Brown, Judith C.; Goodman, Jordan (1980). "Women and Industry in Florence". The Journal of Economic History. 40 (1): 73–80. doi:10.1017/S0022050700104553. ISSN 0022-0507. S2CID 154561359.
- Brown, Judith C. (1984). "Lesbian Sexuality in Renaissance Italy: The Case of Sister Benedetta Carlini". Signs. 9 (4): 751–758. doi:10.1086/494108. ISSN 0097-9740. JSTOR 3173632. S2CID 144189609.

=== Essays ===
- Fumerton, Patricia; Hunt, Simon, eds. (1998). "6: Everyday Life, Longevity, and Nuns in Early Modern Florence (Judith C. Brown)". Renaissance Culture and the Everyday (1st ed.). Philadelphia, Pennsylvania: University of Pennsylvania Press. pp. 115–138. ISBN 0812234545. LCCN 98035173.
- Ferguson, Margaret W.; Quilligan, Maureen; Vickers, Nancy J., eds. (1986). "12: A Woman's Place Was in the Home: Women's Work in Renaissance Tuscany (Judith C. Brown)". Rewriting the Renaissance: The Discourses of Sexual Difference in Early Modern Europe (1st ed.). Chicago, Illinois: University of Chicago Press. pp. 206–224. ISBN 0226243133. LCCN 85028829.
- Duberman, Martin Bauml; Vicinus, Martha; Chauncey, George, eds. (1989). "Lesbian Sexuality in Medieval and Early Modern Europe (Judith C. Brown)". Hidden from History: Reclaiming the Gay and Lesbian Past (1st ed.). New York: New American Library. pp. 67–75. ISBN 0453006892. LCCN 89009417.
- Smyth, Craig Hugh; Garfagnini, Gian Carlo, eds. (1989). "The Economic Decline of Tuscany: The Role of the Rural Economy (Judith C. Brown)". Florence and Milan: Comparisons and Relations – Acts of Two Conferences at Villa I Tatti in 1982–1984 (1st ed.). Florence, Italy: La Nuova Italia Editrice. pp. 101–115. ISBN 8822107179. LCCN 90161561.
- Woolfson, Jonathan, ed. (2004). "Gender (Judith C. Brown)". Advances in Renaissance Historiography (1st ed.). Basingstoke, England, UK: Palgrave Macmillan. pp. 177–192. ISBN 978-1403901170. LCCN 2004051408.
- Wyatt, Michael, ed. (2014). "15: Economies (Judith C. Brown)". Cambridge Companion Guide to the Italian Renaissance (1st ed.). Cambridge, England: Cambridge University Press. pp. 320–337. ISBN 978-0521876063. LCCN 2013024948.

=== Reviews ===
- Brown, Judith C. (2018). "Habitual Offenders: A True Tale of Nuns, Prostitutes, and Murderers in Seventeenth-Century Italy by Craig A. Monson (review)". Early Modern Women. 13 (1). Arizona Center for Medieval and Renaissance Studies: 199–202. doi:10.1353/emw.2018.0061. ISSN 1933-0065. S2CID 191901005.
