= Immodest Acts: The Life of a Lesbian Nun in Renaissance Italy =

1985 non-fiction book by Judith C. Brown

- First edition cover
- Author: Judith C. Brown
- Language: English
- Subject: History of sexuality and gender; lesbianism; early modern European history
- Genre: History
- Publisher: Oxford University Press
- Publication date: November 14, 1985
- Publication place: United States
- Media type: Print (hardback, paperback)
- Pages: 224
- ISBN: 978-0-1950-3675-6
- Website: Book page at OUP

Immodest Acts: The Life of a Lesbian Nun in Renaissance Italy is a non-fiction book by American historian Judith C. Brown, published by Oxford University Press on November 14, 1985, in hardback and on December 11, 1986, in paperback.

The book was adapted into the 2021 film Benedetta, starring Virginie Efira as Benedetta Carlini.

== Synopsis ==
The book is a study of the life of Sister Benedetta Carlini, a 17th-century Italian nun who was accused of lesbianism and other "immodest acts". The book explores the cultural, social, and religious context of the time and the consequences faced by Sister Benedetta as a result of her alleged actions. It is considered a notable work in the field of lesbian history and gender studies, and provides insights into the experiences of women and sexual minorities in early modern Europe.

Living in Tuscany, Benedetta was elected as the abbess due to the notoriety she gained from visions of Jesus. At first, church authorities were skeptical of her visions but eventually embraced them for the prestige it would bring the convent. In 1619, Benedetta had a vision where Jesus commanded her to conduct a "grand wedding ceremony" during which she was to be his bride. This caused unease with church authorities; this resulted in two investigations to determine if her visions were divine or demonic. The author explores the suspicions of the authorities that she was involved in sexual acts with another nun.

== Structure ==
The book is divided into chapters that cover different aspects of Sister Benedetta Carlini's life and the major events of her life.

The opening provides an overview of the cultural, social, and religious context of Renaissance Italy and sets the stage for the story of Sister Benedetta. The subsequent chapters examine the events leading up to Sister Benedetta's accusation of lesbianism, her trial, and the subsequent events in her life. The book also includes a detailed analysis of the written records of the case, including depositions, letters, and court documents.

Throughout the book, the author interweaves historical and cultural analysis with her interpretation of the events. The book concludes with a discussion of the broader implications of the case and its significance for the history of sexuality and gender.

== Reviews ==
- Karras, Ruth Mazo (1987). "Reviewed work: Immodest Acts: The Life of a Lesbian Nun in Renaissance Italy., Judith C. Brown; Holy Anorexia., Rudolph M. Bell". American Journal of Sociology. 93 (1): 234–236. doi:10.1086/228732. JSTOR 2779699.
- Hobby, Elaine (1988). "Reviewed work: Immodest Acts: The Life of a Lesbian Nun in Renaissance Italy, Judith C. Brown". History Workshop (25): 187–190. doi:10.1093/hwj/25.1.187. JSTOR 4288829.
- O'Neil, Mary R. (1986). "Reviewed work: Immodest Acts: The Life of a Lesbian Nun in Renaissance Italy., Judith C. Brown". The Sixteenth Century Journal. 17 (3): 392. doi:10.2307/2540347. JSTOR 2540347.
- אלשך, יהונתן; Alshekh, Yonatan (2003). "דו שיח עם תעודה". Zmanim: A Historical Quarterly / זמנים: רבעון להיסטוריה (83): 111–115. JSTOR 23438342.
- Boesch-Gajano, Sofia (1988). "Reviewed work: Immodest Acts: The Life of a Lesbian Nun in Renaissance Italy, Judith C. Brown". The Journal of Modern History. 60 (1): 172–174. doi:10.1086/243360. JSTOR 1880431.
- Muir, Edward (1988). "Reviewed work: Immodest Acts: The Life of a Lesbian Nun in Renaissance Italy, Judith C. Brown". The American Historical Review. 93 (3): 731–732. doi:10.2307/1868197. JSTOR 1868197.
- Faderman, Lillian (1987). "Reviewed work: Immodest Acts: The Life of a Lesbian Nun in Renaissance Italy, Judith C. Brown; Lesbian Nuns: Breaking Silence, Rosemary Curb, Nancy Manahan". Signs. 12 (3): 576–579. doi:10.1086/494347. JSTOR 3174340.
- Murray, Jacqueline (1988). "Reviewed work: Immodest Acts. The Life of a Lesbian Nun in Renaissance Italy, Judith C. Brown". Renaissance and Reformation / Renaissance et Réforme. 12 (2): 132–135. JSTOR 43444713.
- McGinn, Bernard (1987). "Reviewed work: Immodest Acts: The Life of a Lesbian Nun in Renaissance Italy, Judith C. Brown". Journal of the American Academy of Religion. 55 (4): 820–821. doi:10.1093/jaarel/LV.4.820. JSTOR 1464691.
- Bullard, Melissa Meriam (1987). "Reviewed work: Immodest Acts: The Life of a Lesbian Nun in Renaissance Italy, Judith C. Brown". The Catholic Historical Review. 73 (4): 619–620. JSTOR 25022665.
- Larner, John (1986). "Reviewed work: IMMODEST ACTS: THE LIFE OF a LESBIAN NUN IN RENAISSANCE ITALY, Judith C. Brown". History. 71 (233): 508–509. JSTOR 24415206.
- Watkins, Renee Neu (1986). "Three Paths to the Past". The Women's Review of Books. 3 (8): 17–18. doi:10.2307/4019799. JSTOR 4019799.
- Cervigni, Dino S. (1987). "Reviewed work: Immodest Acts: The Life of a Lesbian Nun in Renaissance Italy. Studies in the History of Sexuality, Judith C. Brown". Annali d'Italianistica. 5: 284–286. JSTOR 24004349.
