= E. Ann Matter =

- Born: December 29, 1949 (age 76)
- Education: Oberlin College (BA); Yale University (MA, MPhil, PhD)

E. Ann Matter (born December 29, 1949) is former Associate Dean for Arts & Letters and Professor of Religious Studies Emerita at the University of Pennsylvania. She specializes in Medieval Christianity, including mysticism, women and religion, sexuality and religion, manuscript and textual studies, biblical interpretation and sacred music.

== Education ==
Matter was educated at Oberlin College, where she received her B.A. in Religion (1971), and at Yale University, where she received her M.A. (1974), M.Phil. (1975), and Ph.D. (1976) in Religious Studies under the supervision of Jaroslav Pelikan.

In 1976, Matter began to teach at the University of Pennsylvania, where, in 1996, she was elected R. Jean Brownlee Professor of Religious Studies. In 2005, Matter was appointed William R. Kenan Professor of Religious Studies and in 2006 to the post of Associate Dean for Arts & Letters, with responsibility for all 12 of the University's humanities departments.

In 1992, she received a Guggenheim Fellowship and, in 2003, she was elected Fellow of the Medieval Academy of America.

== Books ==
Matter is the author of

- The Voice of My Beloved: The Song of Songs in Western Medieval Christianity, University of Pennsylvania Press, 1990

She is editor or translator of:

- Paschasius Radbertus, De partu Virginis, Brepols, 1985
- Grazia Deledda, La chiesa della solitudine, 1936, translated as The Church of Solitude, University of New York Press, 2002
- Lucy Brocadelli, Una mistica contestata: La Vita di Lucia da Narni (1476-1544) tra agiografia e autobiografia, with Gabriella Zarri, Ed. Storia e Lett., 2011
- Alberto Alfieri, Education, Civic Virtue, and Colonialism in Fifteenth-Century Italy: The Ogdoas of Alberto Alfieri, Arizona Center for Medieval and Renaissance Studies, 2011

She is also the editor or co-editor of

- Creative Women in Medieval and Early Modern Italy: A Religious and Artistic Renaissance, University of Pennsylvania Press, 1994
- The Liturgy of the Medieval Church, Western Michigan University, 2001
- Mind Matters: Studies of Medieval and Early Modern Intellectual History in Honour of Marcia Colish, Turnhout, 2009
- The New Cambridge History of the Bible, Vol. II: From 600 to 1450, Cambridge University Press, 2012
- From Knowledge to Beatitude: St. Victor, Twelfth-century Scholars, and Beyond: Essays in Honor of Grover A. Zinn, Jr, University of Notre Dame Press, 2013
